= The Lin Hotel =

Hotel in Xitun, Taichung, Taiwan

- 林酒店
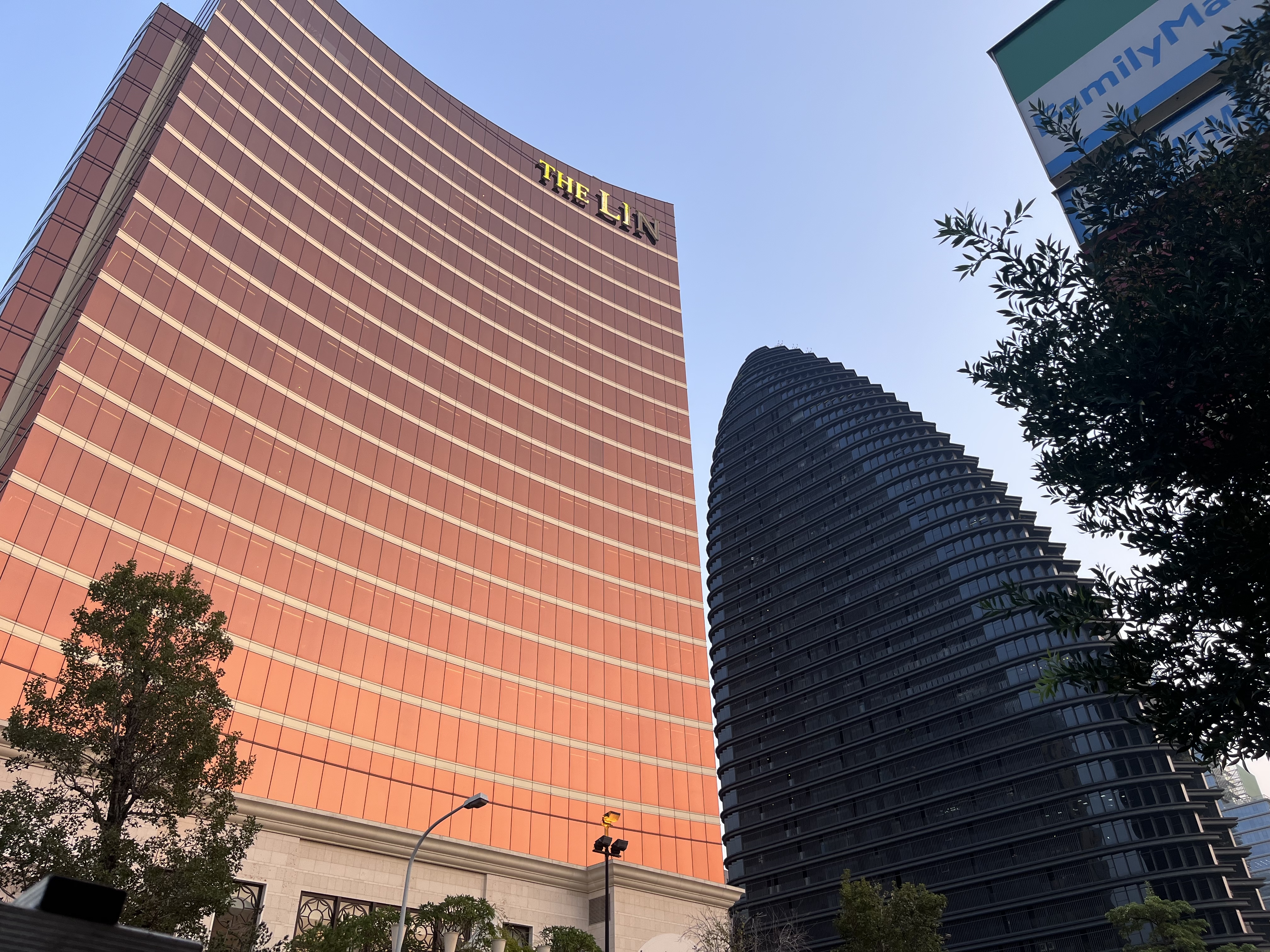
- View of The Lin Hotel and National Trade Center
- Interactive map of the The Lin Hotel area

General information
- Status: Completed
- Type: hotel
- Location: 99, Chaofu Road, Xitun District, Taichung, Taiwan
- Coordinates: 24°9′55″N 120°38′14″E
- Construction started: 2010
- Completed: 2014
- Opened: 21 May 2015

Height
- Height: 106 m (348 ft)

Technical details
- Floor count: 24 above ground 3 below ground
- Floor area: 49,662 m^{2} (534,560 sq ft)

Other information
- Number of rooms: 309
- Public transit: Taichung City Hall metro station

Website
- Official website

The Lin Hotel (Chinese: 林酒店) is a 106 m (348 ft) tall, 24-story five-star hotel located on Chaofu Road, Xitun District, Taichung, Taiwan. With a total floor area of 49,662 m^{2} (534,560 sq ft), the construction of the building began in 2010 and was completed in 2014. The hotel officially opened on 21 May 2015.

== Facilities ==
The hotel houses a total of 309 rooms and contains facilities such as a gym, outdoor swimming pool and health spa and massage.

== Location ==
The closest metro station to the hotel is Taichung City Hall metro station located on the Green line of Taichung MRT. The hotel is located within Taichung's CBD and hence is within walking distance of National Taichung Theater, Fulfillment Amphitheater and Chaoma Sports Center, as well as shopping malls such as Top City, Tiger City and IKEA Wenxin Store.

== See also ==
- Taichung's 7th Redevelopment Zone
- Tempus Hotel Taichung
- Millennium Hotel Taichung
