= Millennium Hotel Taichung =

Hotel in Xitun, Taichung, Taiwan

Millennium Hotel Taichung 台中日月千禧酒店
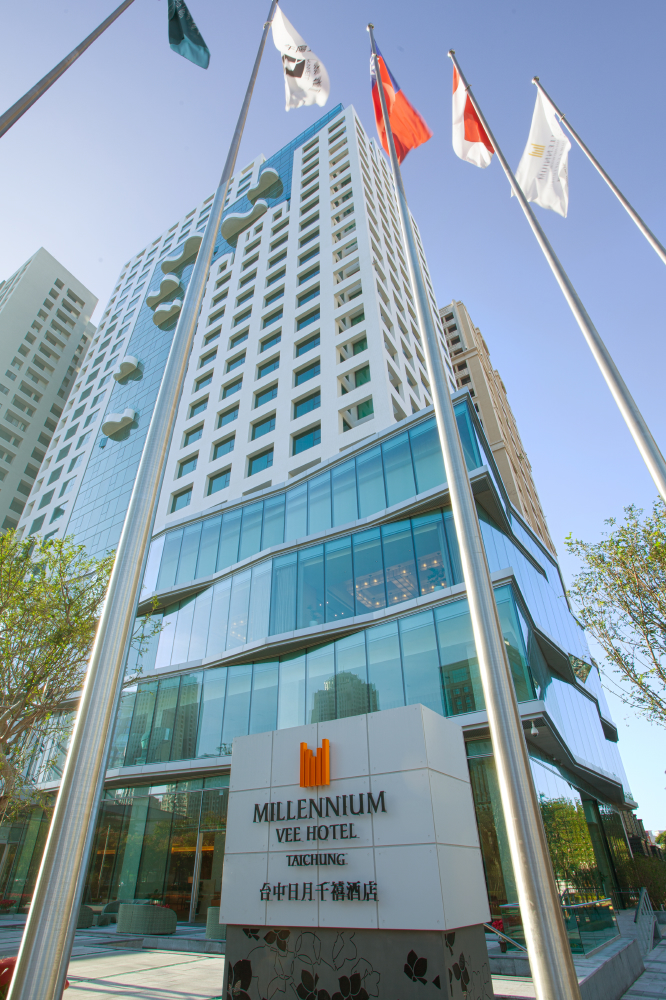
- Interactive map of Millennium Hotel Taichung 台中日月千禧酒店

General information
- Type: hotel
- Location: No. 77, Shizheng Road, Xitun District, Taichung, Taiwan
- Coordinates: 24°09′24.3″N 120°38′31.3″E
- Completed: 2012

Height
- Architectural: 325 ft (99 m)

Technical details
- Floor count: 24

Millennium Hotel Taichung (Chinese: 台中日月千禧酒店) is a 24-storey, 325 ft (99 m) skyscraper hotel completed in 2012 as Millennium Vee Hotel Taichung, is located in Taichung's 7th Redevelopment Zone, Xitun District, Taichung, Taiwan. Managed by the Millennium & Copthorne Hotels, the hotel is one of the top luxury hotels in Taichung.

== Facilities ==
The five-star hotel has a total of 243 rooms including premium suites, themed restaurants, a café and a bar. Other facilities include a gym, club lounge, swimming pool, as well as meetings and events facilities.

=== Restaurants & Bars ===
- Soluna - All Day Dining: Restaurant buffet serving a wide variety of both international and local flavors.
- Private Dining Room: Chinese restaurant featuring traditional Taiwanese and Cantonese cuisine.
- Lumi Bar: Lounge bar and café offering hot and cold beverages as well as light meals.
- The Prime - Grill & Lounge: Restaurant offering a variety of steak and seafood dishes.

== Location ==
The closest metro station to the hotel is Taichung City Hall metro station located on the Green line of Taichung MRT. The hotel is located within Taichung's CBD and hence is within walking distance of National Taichung Theater, Fulfillment Amphitheater and Chaoma Sports Center, as well as shopping malls such as Top City, Tiger City and IKEA Wenxin Store.

== See also ==
- Taichung's 7th Redevelopment Zone
- The Splendor Hotel Taichung
- Windsor Hotel Taichung
- The Lin Hotel
- Tempus Hotel Taichung
