= Tempus Hotel Taichung =

Hotel in Xitun, Taichung, Taiwan

- 永豐棧酒店
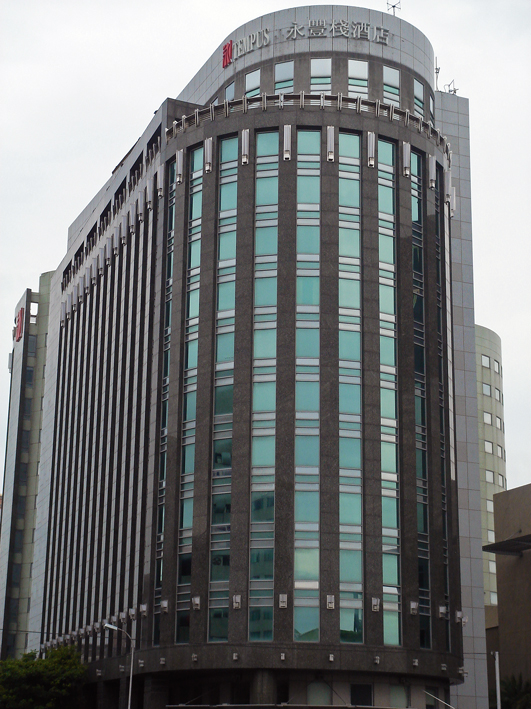
- View of the hotel
- Interactive map of the Tempus Hotel Taichung area

General information
- Status: Completed
- Type: Hotel
- Location: 689, Section 2, Taiwan Boulevard, Xitun District, Taichung, Taiwan
- Coordinates: 24°9′32″N 120°39′20″E
- Opened: 1997

Other information
- Number of rooms: 334
- Public transit: Taichung City Hall metro station

Website
- Official website

Tempus Hotel Taichung (Chinese: 永豐棧酒店; pinyin: Yǒngfēngzhàn jiǔdiàn) is a five-star hotel located on Taiwan Boulevard, Xitun District, Taichung, Taiwan that opened in 1997.

== History ==
The hotel was opened in 1997 by businessman He Fangzhan (Chinese: 何豐棧). Being one of the first business-oriented hotels in the area, it initially attracted various VIP guests, including figures in the Hong Kong entertainment industry. Despite the negative impact of the 1999 Jiji earthquake and the 2003 SARS outbreak on the hotel industry, Tempus continued to operate and reached a peak occupancy period between 2010, when the He family bought the Ali Seafood chain of fine dining restaurants and opened a branch in the hotel, and 2016, when the hotel acquired a former fishing area in Hengchun and rebranded it as Tempus Resort Kenting (Chinese: 永豐棧後壁湖畔). However, the reduction of Chinese tourism after Tsai Ing-wen came to power in 2016 and the impact of the COVID-19 pandemic led to the hotel's business declining, leading to the hotel owing creditors over NT$3,000,000,000 (US$100 million) by 2021. He leased the hotel out to a different company, but entered a legal dispute with then in 2022 over lack of payments and maintenance. After suspending operations, the hotel was acquired by Dunqian Intelligent Technology in April 2023 and reopened in May 2023.

== Facilities ==
The hotel houses a total of 334 rooms and contains facilities such as a gym, outdoor swimming pool and health spa and massage.

== Location ==
The closest metro station to the hotel is Taichung City Hall metro station located on the Green line of Taichung MRT. The hotel is located within Taichung's CBD and hence is within walking distance of National Taichung Theater, Fulfillment Amphitheater and Chaoma Sports Center, as well as shopping malls such as Top City, Tiger City and IKEA Wenxin Store.

== See also ==
- Taichung's 7th Redevelopment Zone
- The Lin Hotel
- Millennium Hotel Taichung
