= T3 (skyscraper) =

Skyscraper office building in Xitun, Taichung, Taiwan

T3 親家T3市政國際中心
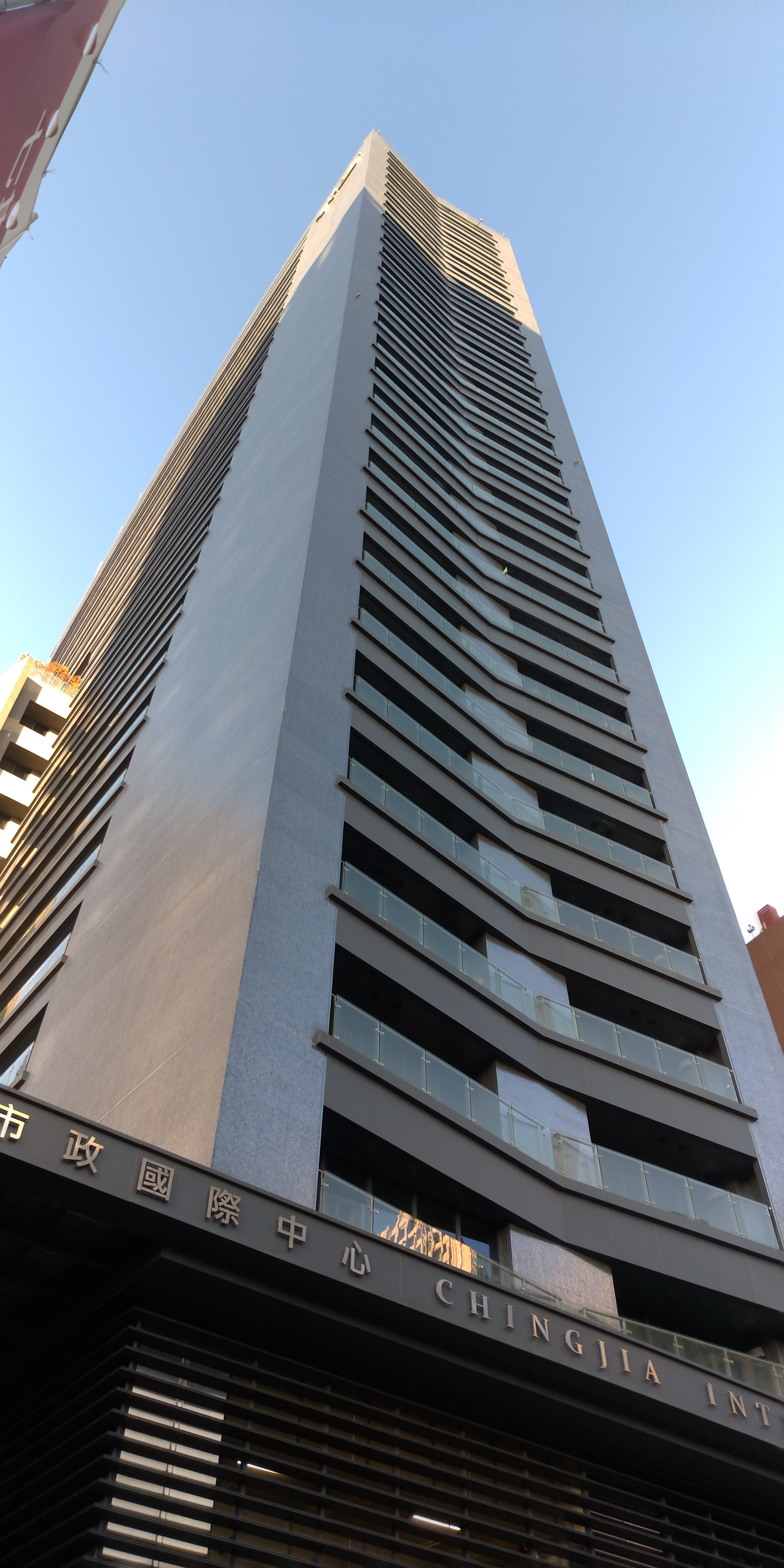
- Interactive map of the T3 親家T3市政國際中心 area

General information
- Status: Completed
- Type: Office
- Location: No. 500, Shizheng North 1st Road, Xitun District, Taichung, Taiwan
- Coordinates: 24.160299100773226°N 120.63793382774574°E
- Completed: 2013

Height
- Architectural: 123 m (404 ft)

Technical details
- Floor count: 30
- Lifts/elevators: 6

T3, also known as Chingjia International Center (Chinese: 親家T3市政國際中心; pinyin: Qìng jiā T3 shìzhèng guójì zhōngxīn), is a skyscraper office building located in Taichung's 7th Redevelopment Zone, Xitun District, Taichung, Taiwan. The building was completed in 2013. The height of the building is 123 m (404 ft) and it comprises 30 floors above ground, as well as six basement levels. As of February 2021, it is the 49th tallest building in Taichung.

The building is environmentally friendly and energy-saving and has a deep window glass façade. In addition to the 10-meter high three-entry style corridor entrance hall and modern offices, facilities of the office building includes a sky garden banquet hall on the top floor similar to the one at Lebua at State Tower in Bangkok, a fitness room on the 14th floor, and more than 10 conference rooms of various sizes.

== See also ==
- List of tallest buildings in Taiwan
- List of tallest buildings in Taichung
- T-Power (skyscraper)
