= Assault of Akio Yaita =

At 11:40 a.m. Taipei time on July 6, 2026, Japanese-Taiwanese media personality Akio Yaita (矢板 明夫／やいた あきお) was punched by a Hong Kong man, Liao Kang-fa (廖港發), in the lobby of the Tempus Hotel in Xitun District, Taichung, Taiwan. The assault caused a laceration to his lip, inflammation of the periodontal ligament and alveolar bone, and cracks in his teeth. After the attack, Liao immediately changed his clothes to evade detection. After receiving instructions from the mastermind behind the operation to "flee the country as soon as possible," he purchased a ticket to Busan, South Korea. However, Taiwanese police intercepted and arrested him at the Taichung International Airport 15 minutes before boarding. He was subsequently ordered by a court to be detained incommunicado pending investigation.

Because Liao has ties to Hong Kong triads and a history of multiple criminal convictions, the modus operandi of his attack, together with that of another Hong Kong national accompanying him, led the Taiwanese government to strongly suspect that this was the first case of "transnational repression" to occur in Taiwan since the legislation of the Law on Promoting Ethnic Unity and Progress.

The incident prompted strong condemnation from political parties across Taiwan’s political spectrum and from civil society groups. The Executive Yuan and the Mainland Affairs Council subsequently announced plans to amend the law and increase criminal penalties for transnational repression carried out by foreign forces. The Taiwan Affairs Office of the Chinese Communist Party, however, responded that the case was merely an isolated ordinary public-security incident and said that the suspect had acted out of “righteous indignation.” Taiwanese legal scholars pointed out that the current Anti-Infiltration Act does not cover the offense of assault, creating a gap in the application of the law in judicial practice.

== Background ==
The victim, Akio Yaita, is a Japanese-Taiwanese media personality who has long commented in Taiwan on cross-Strait relations and international politics. He has repeatedly criticized the Chinese Communist Party regime, and his political views are generally regarded as leaning toward anti-communism. Before the incident, the Chinese government formally implemented the Law on Promoting Ethnic Unity and Progress. The law expanded the PRC government’s extraterritorial jurisdiction over conduct deemed harmful to national interests and ethnic unity. Taiwan’s national security authorities and the Mainland Affairs Council stated that since the law came into effect, threats and pressure from PRC intelligence agencies and foreign hostile forces targeting overseas dissidents and anti-communist figures have become increasingly frequent, significantly increasing the personal security risks faced by such individuals abroad.

The accused, Liao Kang-fa, is a 33-year-old Hong Kong resident born in Guangdong who later moved to Hong Kong and joined the triad. Former Sham Shui Po District councilor Lee Man-ho stated that Liao was sentenced to 50 months in prison for drug trafficking in 2016 and alleged that he was sent by the Chinese Communist Party to commit the crime after his release. However, authorities have not confirmed this claim. Sources and intelligence officials said individuals with criminal records and financial vulnerabilities may be susceptible to control by Chinese Communist Party or criminal networks and could be recruited for overseas operations, with the actual planners remaining hidden. Mainland Affairs Council spokesperson Liang Wen-chieh said the Chinese Communist Party had long cultivated ties with Hong Kong’s underworld, including before the 1997 handover, and has repeatedly been accused of using gang members for political and cross-border operations.

== Assault and arrest ==
According to Taiwan’s immigration records, suspect Liao Kang-fa entered Taiwan as a tourist from January 11 to February 22, 2026, staying for more than a month. He returned to Taiwan on July 2 with another Chinese national holding a Hong Kong passport. The two stayed at a hotel in Taichung and began monitoring Akio Yaita’s public schedule. They changed hotels three times to evade detection. Another five accomplices entered Taiwan on July 4. On July 5, the Hong Kong man accompanying Liao left Taiwan, while Liao checked into a hotel opposite the event venue and waited for an opportunity to attack Yaita.

At 11:40 a.m. on July 6, 2026, Liao ambushed Yaita in the lobby of the Tempus Hotel in Taichung and punched him. Bystanders immediately called the police. Yaita suffered a split lip, inflammation of the periodontal ligament and alveolar bone, cracked teeth, and a blunt-force injury to the jaw. After the attack, Liao reportedly contacted his handlers by phone to report that the “mission was successful” and was instructed to “leave the country as soon as possible.” He therefore abandoned his original plan to return to Hong Kong on July 7. Liao changed his clothes from black to white and purchased a ticket to Busan, South Korea, but Taichung police intercepted and arrested him 15 minutes before boarding.

== Investigation and legal proceedings ==
After being arrested at Taichung International Airport, suspect Liao Kang-fa was transferred to the Taichung District Prosecutors Office for questioning. Prosecutors determined that his immediate report to his handlers after the attack and his attempt to change flights and leave Taiwan indicated that the incident was not a spontaneous act of random violence, but may have been premeditated and carried out at someone’s direction. Prosecutors considered Liao a flight risk and believed he might destroy evidence or collude with others. Given evidence suggesting possible involvement by an overseas organization, they sought his detention without visitation under Taiwan’s Criminal Code for alleged assault and related offenses. The court approved the request, while authorities continued investigating overseas financial transfers and the alleged chain of command. The other Hong Kong man who left Taiwan on July 5 was also identified as a suspected accomplice, with investigators using immigration and communications records to determine his role and level of involvement.

Police further alleged that Liao was a member of the Hong Kong triad Wo Shing Wo and had received HK$50,000 from an organizer, Chan Wai-ho. Chan allegedly sent five accomplices to Taiwan to assist. The six men communicated and coordinated through a WhatsApp group and received remote instructions. Investigators said the five accomplices entered Taiwan on July 4, discussed the attack plan near Taichung’s Fengjia Night Market, and visited the Tempus Hotel in advance to inspect the venue, reserve a private room, and determine the layout and escape routes.

== Transnational repression by China ==
On 5 November 2026, the Mainland Affairs Council reported to the Legislative Yuan that, since 2005, China has carried out transnational repression against 131 people from Taiwan, involving 149 incidents. These tactics fall into assaults, paint attacks, and staged traffic accidents, bounty, illegal arrests, and judicial proceedings, labeling individuals as Diehard Taiwan independence separatists, surveillance, stalking, distributing satellite images of people's homes, spreading disinformation, and border controls.

The same day, Taiwan's National Police Agency announced it has handled nine cases of transnational repression in 2026 alone. Among those 9 cases, 4 were charged and the rest were investigating. Other than this case, the others are:

=== Charged ===
- Surveillance of Taiwanese politician Puma Shen (October 2024-2026)
- Staged traffic accident of Huang Yi-hao (11 September 2026)
- Comedy club in Taipei vandalized with paint (29 May 2026)

=== Investigating ===
- Tang Wai-hung's Muay Thai studio vandalized with paint twice (24 November 2025 and 4 February 2026)
- Harassment to Human Rights Network for Tibet and Taiwan (13 March 2026)
- Guan Jianzhong case for distributing the documentary State Organs (國有器官)
- Another undisclosed

== See also ==
- Knife attack on Kevin Lau
- 2019 Yuen Long attack
