= Treasure Garden =

Residential skyscraper in Xitun District of Taichung, Taiwan

Treasure Garden 寶格
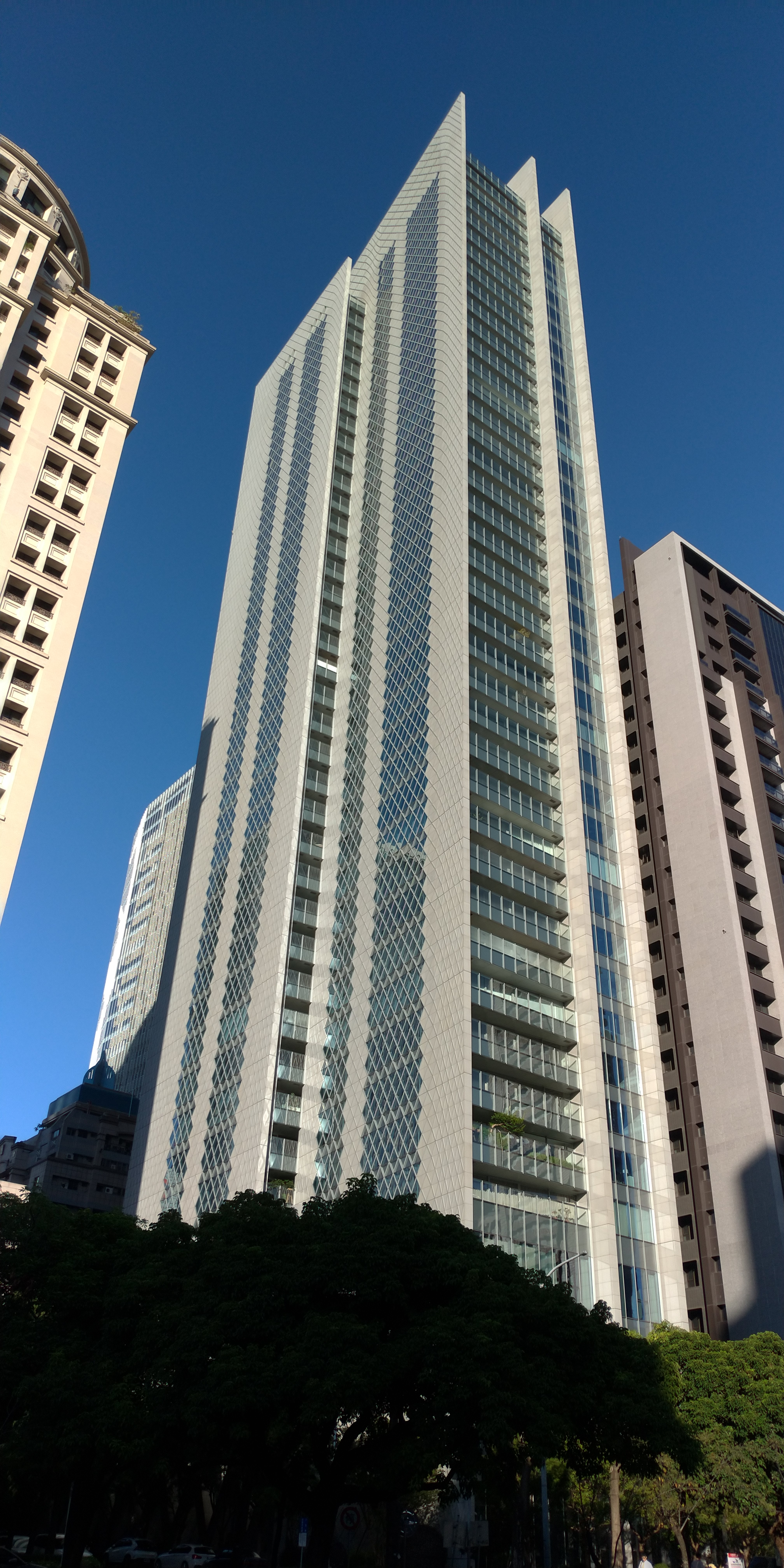
- Interactive map of the Treasure Garden 寶格 area

General information
- Status: Completed
- Type: Residential
- Location: Xitun District, Taichung, Taiwan
- Coordinates: 24°09′43″N 120°38′37″E
- Construction started: 2014
- Completed: 2017

Height
- Architectural: 160 m (520 ft)

Technical details
- Floor count: 39
- Floor area: 29,349 m^{2} (315,910 sq ft)

Design and construction
- Architects: Antonio Citterio Patricia Viel and Partners

The Treasure Garden (Chinese: 寶格; pinyin: Bǎo gé) is a residential skyscraper located in Xitun District, Taichung, Taiwan. It is designed by Antonio Citterio Patricia Viel and Partners. As of December 2020, it is the 9th tallest building in Taichung and 29th tallest in Taiwan. The height of the building is 160 m (520 ft), with a floor area of 29,349 m^{2} (315,910 sq ft), and it comprises 39 floors above ground, as well as six basement levels.

== See also ==
- List of tallest buildings in Taiwan
- List of tallest buildings in Taichung
- Taichung's 7th Redevelopment Zone
- Antonio Citterio
- La Bella Vita (skyscraper)
