= Taichung 7th Redevelopment Zone =

Central business district in Taichung, Taiwan

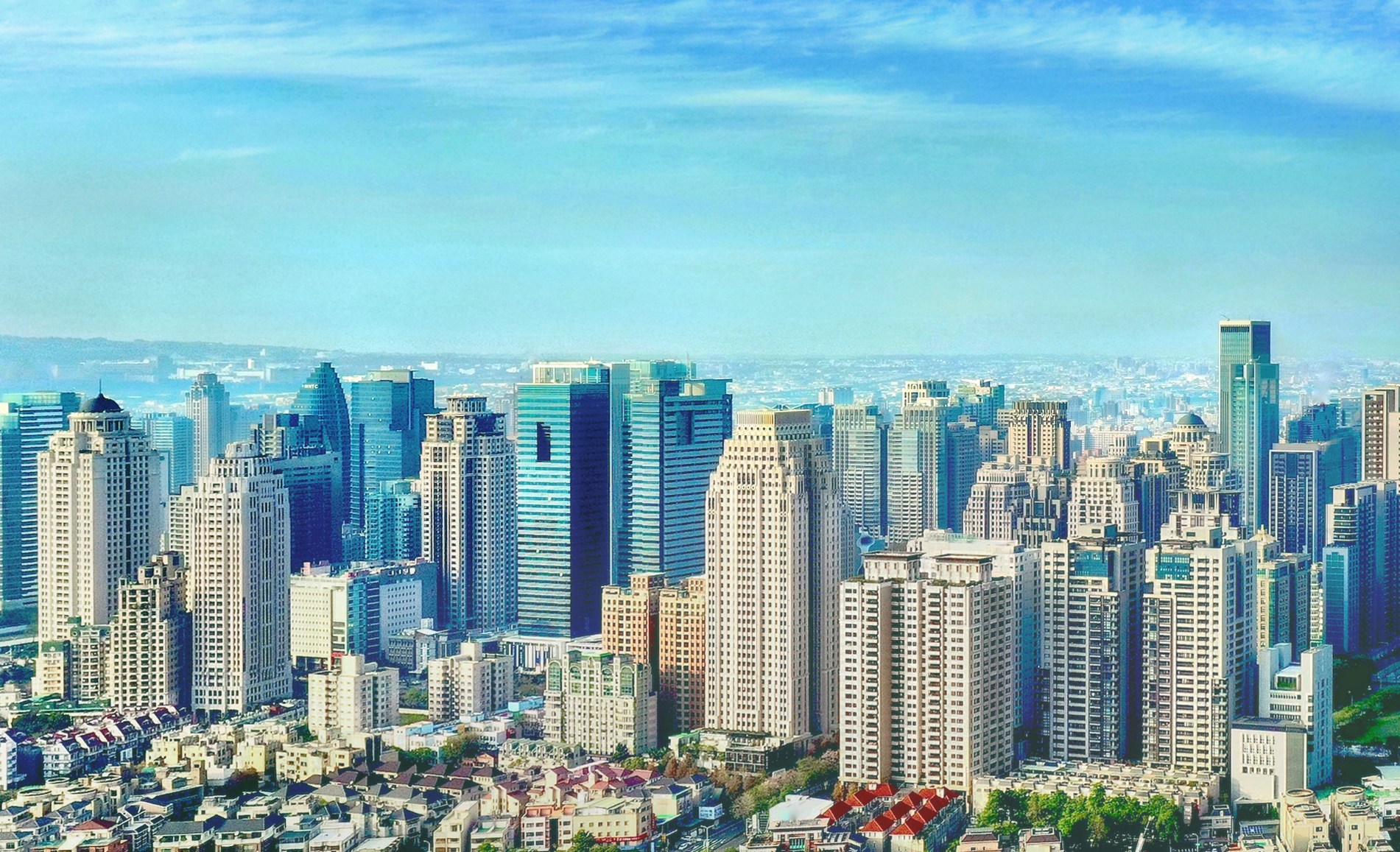
7th Redevelopment Zone skyline

The Taichung 7th Redevelopment Zone (Chinese: 臺中市第七期市地重劃區) is located in Xitun District and Nantun District, known to many local residents by its abbreviated Mandarin name "Qīqí" (七期).

This area is adjacent to the 3rd, 4th, and 5th Redevelopment Zone. Before the Taichung 7th Redevelopment Zone Plan, only a few farmhouses were scattered along a limited number of narrow streets. Today, this area is the site of Taichung's new city government center, and it is the central business district (CBD) of Taichung City. It features broad and widely spaced boulevards, attractive apartments, department stores, and office towers, which are brightly lit at night. There are many universities nearby, such as Tunghai University and Feng Chia University.

== Historical development ==
Its historical development began in 1986 when the Taichung City Government designated the agricultural area south of Taichung Port Rd. (present-day Taiwan Boulevard) and west of Wenxin Rd. as the 7th Redevelopment Zone. The goal of this redevelopment was originally to set up a secondary commercial center to relieve the old downtown area (Central District). However, as the population continued to grow and the scale of the city expanded, the Taichung city center gradually moved westward.

In February 1990, the 7th Redevelopment Zone was officially carried out, with an area of 353.3983 hectares and a total of 5.54 billion New Taiwan dollars spent, making it the most expensive redevelopment zone at the time. The land redevelopment was completed in November 1992.

In 1996, the Taichung City Government planned to relocate the Taichung City Hall from Central District to this area, and since then the area has been positioned as the new municipal center. Therefore, after the 2000s, the 7th Redevelopment Zone gradually replaced the old downtown area as the central business district of Taichung.

Development changes in 7th Redevelopment Zone

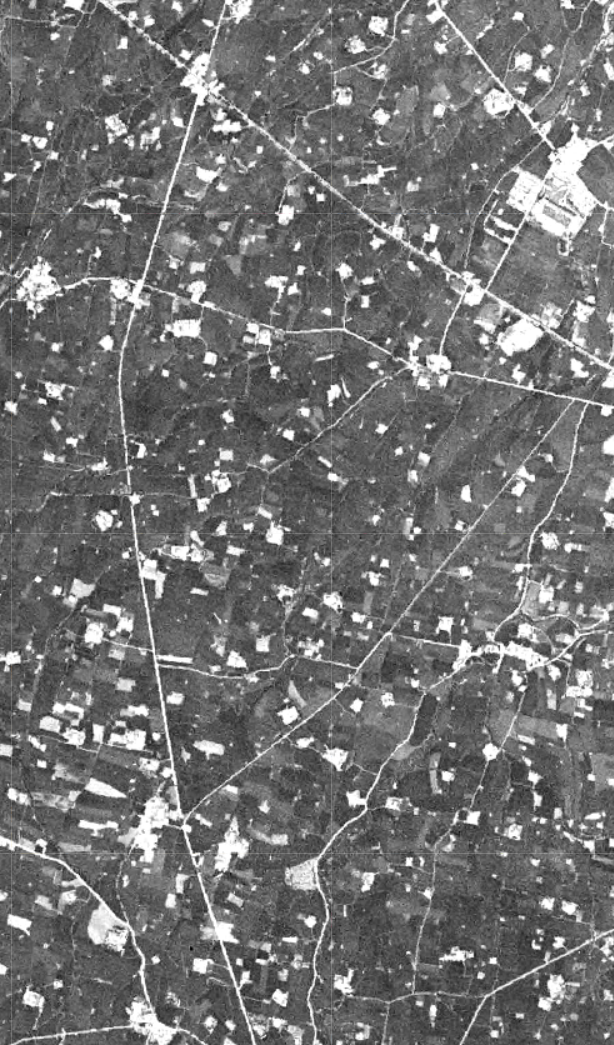
Before the plan, existing roads were narrow with a few farm buildings scattered throughout a primarily-agricultural area.

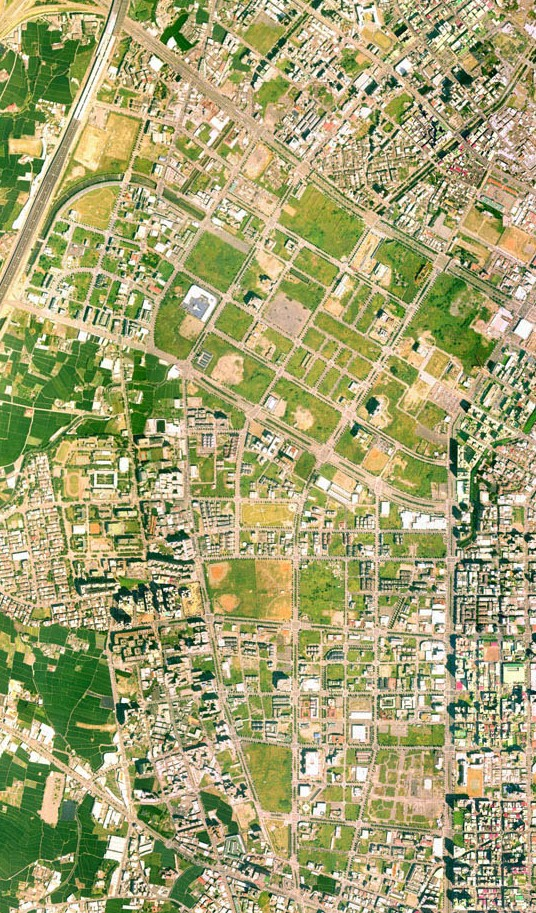
In 1998, the consolidation of land and roads were completed, but the land was mostly undeveloped.

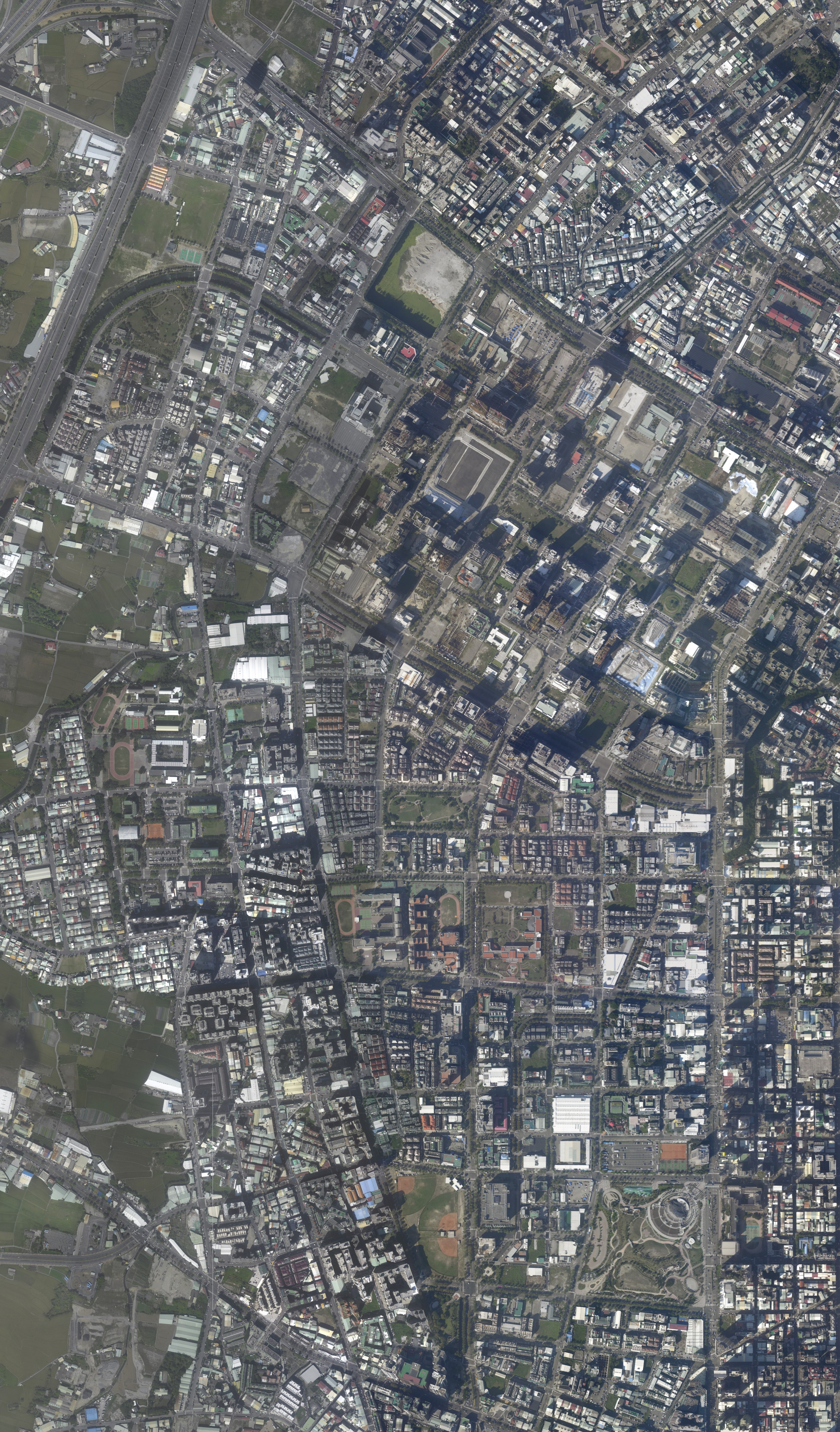
In 2008, a large amount of land was under development, and major construction was completed one after another.

== Area range ==
7th Redevelopment Zone could be divided into North, South and West sections.

7th Redevelopment Zone starts from Wenxin Road in the east and ends at Huanzhong Road and Henan Road in the west, from Dadun 4th Street in the south to Taiwan Boulevard in the north.

- Total consolidation area: 353.3983 hectare
- Building area: 202.5476 hectare
- Section names after the consolidation: Huiguo (惠國), Huitai (惠泰), Huimin (惠民), Huian (惠安), Huishun (惠順), Huiren (惠仁), Huiyi (惠義), Huili (惠禮), Huizhi (惠智) and Huixin (惠信)

== Transportation ==
With National Freeway 1, Provincial Highway 74, and the Chaoma Station (one of highway passenger transport hubs in Taichung), the 7th Redevelopment Zone is the most convenient place for transportation in Taichung.

The Taichung MRT Green line and the future Blue line pass through this area.

Road

- Provincial Highway 74：Xitun 1
- Taiwan Boulevard

Rail

- Taichung MRT
  - Green line: Taichung City Hall, Shui-an Temple, Wenxin Forest Park

== Main buildings ==
Section	Block	Name	Floors	Height (m)	Floor area (m^{2})	Status	Completed	Usage	Notes
North	機1	Taichung City Hall	10	43.8	116,956.72	Completed	2010	Government	
North	機2	Taichung City Council	15	69.8	43,303.72	Completed	2012	Government	
North	公3	National Taichung Theater	6	37.7	51,166.75	Completed	2014	Government	
North	新3	Royal Landmark Tower	39	158.8	70,817.8	Completed	2011	Residential	
North	新3	Cosmos (skyscraper)	38	151.4	39,957.45	Completed	2018	Residential	
North	新4	Shin Kong Mitsukoshi	14	69.8	160,025.56	Completed	2000	Commercial	
North	新4	City Center Plaza	38	161.3	92,496.24	Completed	2010	Office	
North	新4	Top City	14	69.9	177,754.89	Completed	2011	Commercial	
North	新4	Global Strategy Center	38	171.5	74,094.71	Completed	2015	Office	
North	新4	The Landmark (Taichung)	39	192.0	62,034.99	Completed	2018	Office	
North	新4	Taiwan Summit Tower	40	182.55	69,713.63	Under construction	2029	Office	
North	新4	Kuma Tower	42	208	115,090.39	Under construction	2026	Office, Commercial	
North	新5	Tiger City	9	43.39	49119.96	Completed	2001	Commercial	
North	新5	Ding Sheng BHW Taiwan Central Plaza	36	158.95	104,111.75	Completed	2014	Office	
North	新5	National Trade Center	35	165.65	78,905.64	Completed	2018	Office	
North	新6	Four Seasons (skyscraper)	35	137.7	44,930.12	Completed	2009	Residential	
North	新6	Grand Modesty	32	123.6	91,176.07	Completed	2010	Residential	
North	新6	The Heritage Grand Tower	35	139.9	121,134.17	Completed	2011	Residential	
North	新6	T3 (skyscraper)	30	122.8	39,757.84	Completed	2012	Office	
North	新6	Du Show	34	129.7	34,658.05	Completed	2013	Residential	
North	新6	Yun Yan Building	39	143.7	58,552.14	Completed	2015	Residential	
North	新6	Pao Huei Solitaire	41	160.9	88,161.36	Completed	2015	Residential	
North	新6	The Palace	35	139	45,722.61	Completed	2016	Residential	
North	新6	T-Power (skyscraper)	28	125.52	52,559.65	Completed	2017	Office	
North	新6	Treasure Garden	39	161.1	41,357.42	Completed	2017	Residential	
North	新6	CTBC Taichung Headquarters	28	132.2	40,702.83	Completed	2017	Office	
North	新6	Plato Palace	43	172.8	46,714.97	Completed	2021	Residential	
North	新6	Cathay High Rise	32	120.14	27,353.29	Completed	2019	Residential	
North	新6	La Bella Vita (skyscraper)	33	127	55,809.29	Completed	2019	Residential	
North	新6	Fongyi Huimin 118	46	201.5	126,742.35	Proposed	-	Office	
North	新8	Taichung Time Square CBD	34	149.0	94,111.59	Completed	2015	Office	
North	新8	Taichung Commercial Bank Headquarters	38	225.0	115,309.2	Under construction	2023	Office, Hotel	
South	市	Carrefour Wenxin Store	7	29.1	62,164.07	Completed	2006	Commercial	
South	市	IKEA Taichung Store	4	28.1	69,486.74	Completed	2013	Commercial	
South	商4-1	Fountain Palace	39	152	55,600.18	Completed	2010	Residential	
South	商4-1	Millennium Hotel Taichung	24	89.95	39,948.68	Completed	2012	Hotel	
South	商4-1	Fuyu Oriental Crown	38	165	51,317.04	Completed	2014	Residential	
South	商4-1	Art Deco Landmark	32	124.4	31,537.06	Completed	2018	Residential	
South	商4-1	Yang Ma Tower	41	163.8	68,501.16	Completed	2019	Residential	
South	住2	Twin Oaks	30	116.7	38,788.78	Completed	2021	Residential	
South	住4	Savoy Palace (skyscraper)	39	157	33,503.32	Completed	2016	Residential	
South	醫專	Lin Shin Hospital	13	49.9	56,352.76	Completed	1999	Medical	
West	商4-1	Chuhofa Sky Building	38	145	36,380.78	Completed	2015	Residential	
West	商4-1	Taichung TOP1 Global Business Center	25	113.75	47,976.08	Under construction	2023	Office	
West	文	Chaoma Sports Center	3	24	11,948.68	Completed	2016	Sports	

== Gallery ==
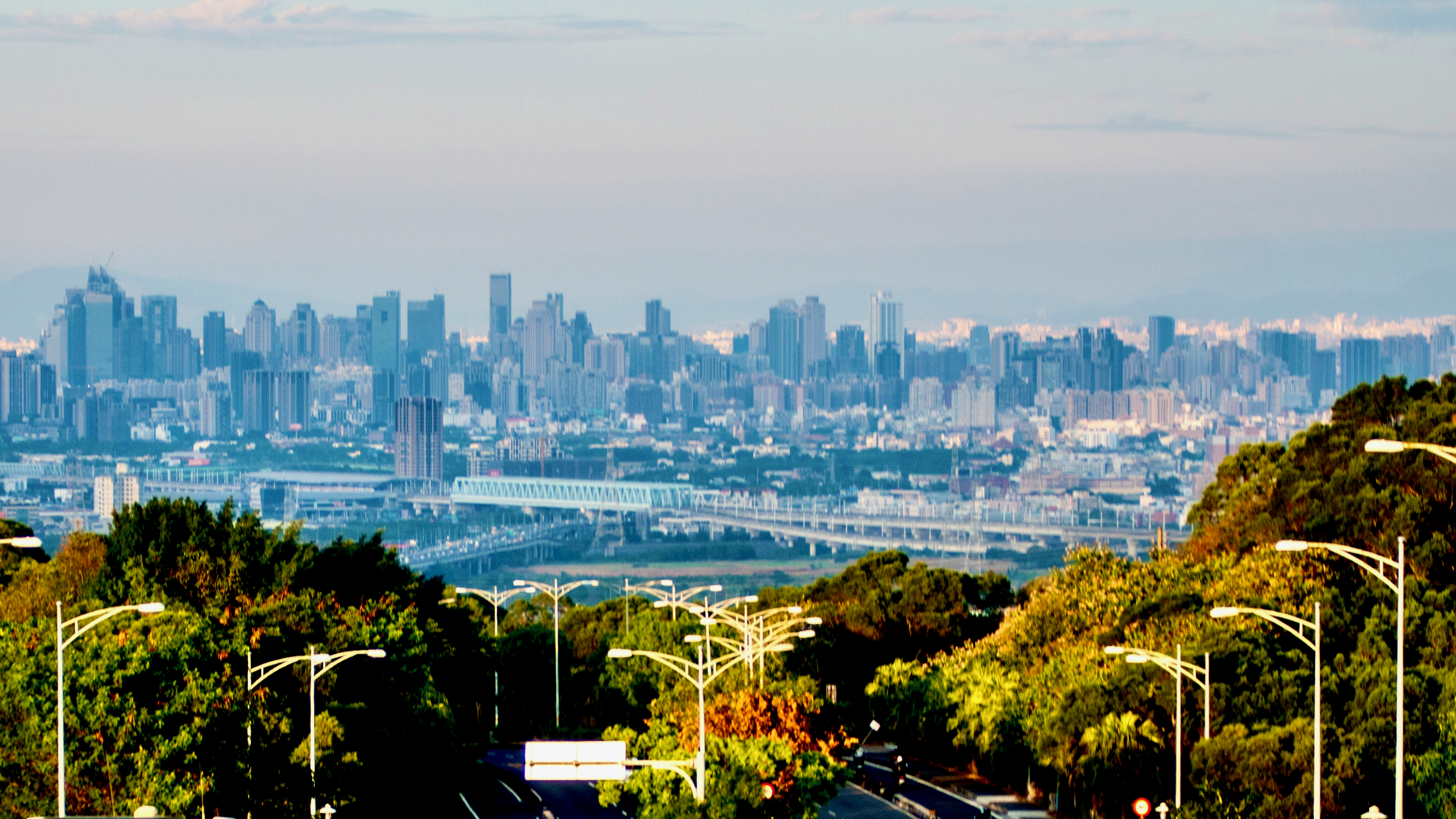
7th Redevelopment Zone skyline viewed from Highway 74A

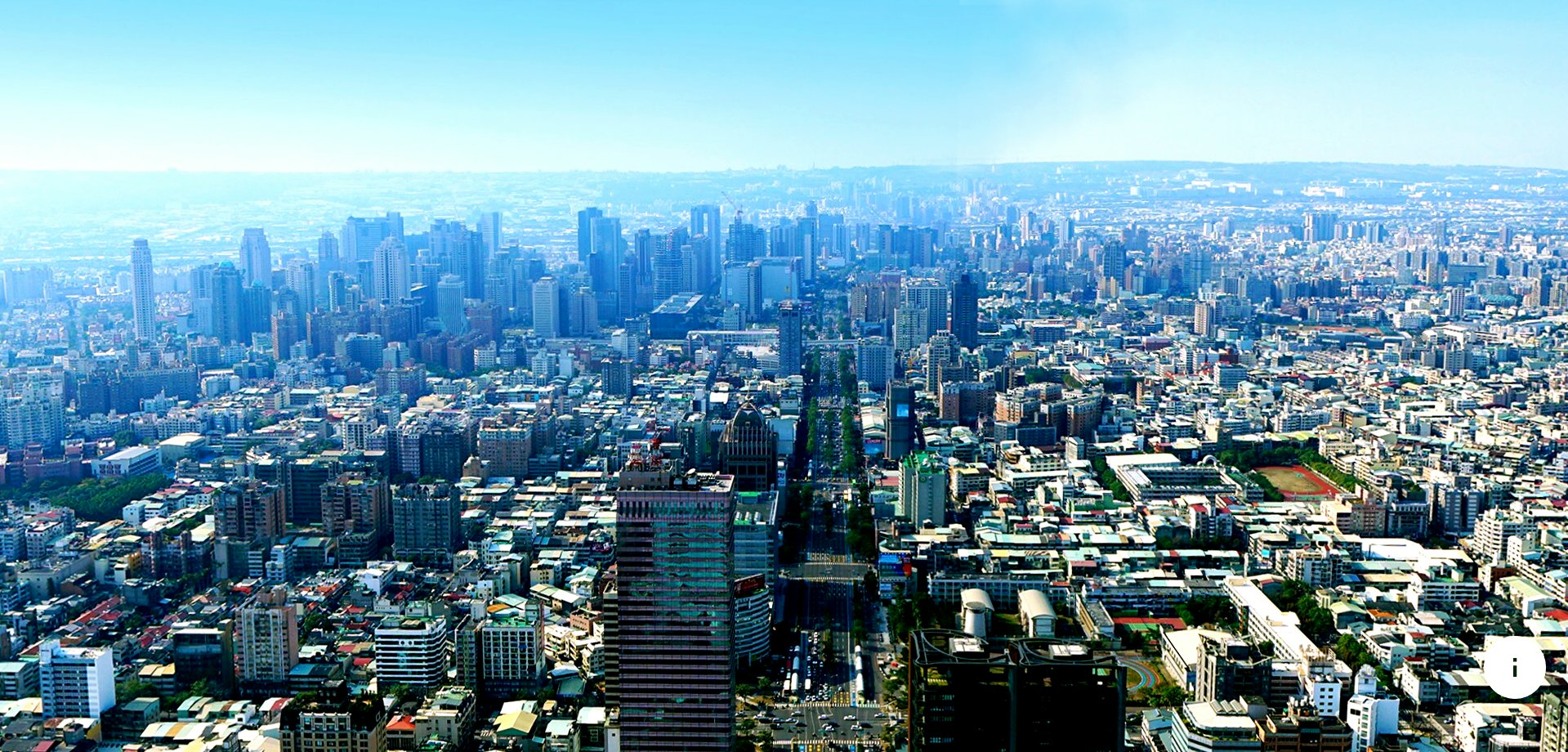
View of 7th Redevelopment Zone, from Taiwan Boulevard

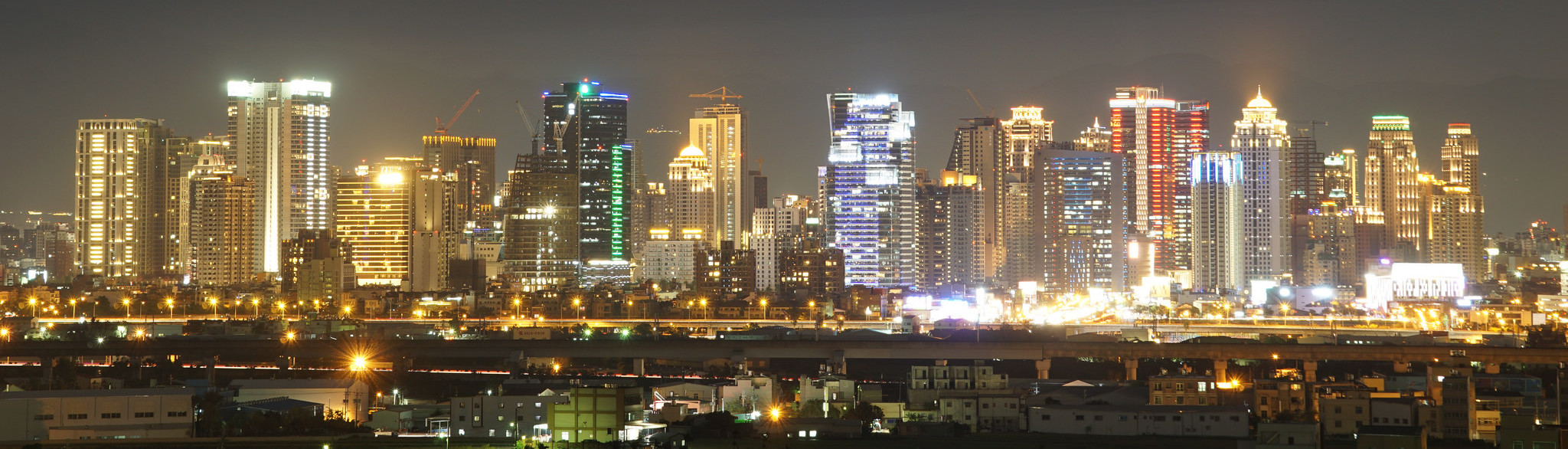
View of Taichung's 7th Redevelopment Zone at night

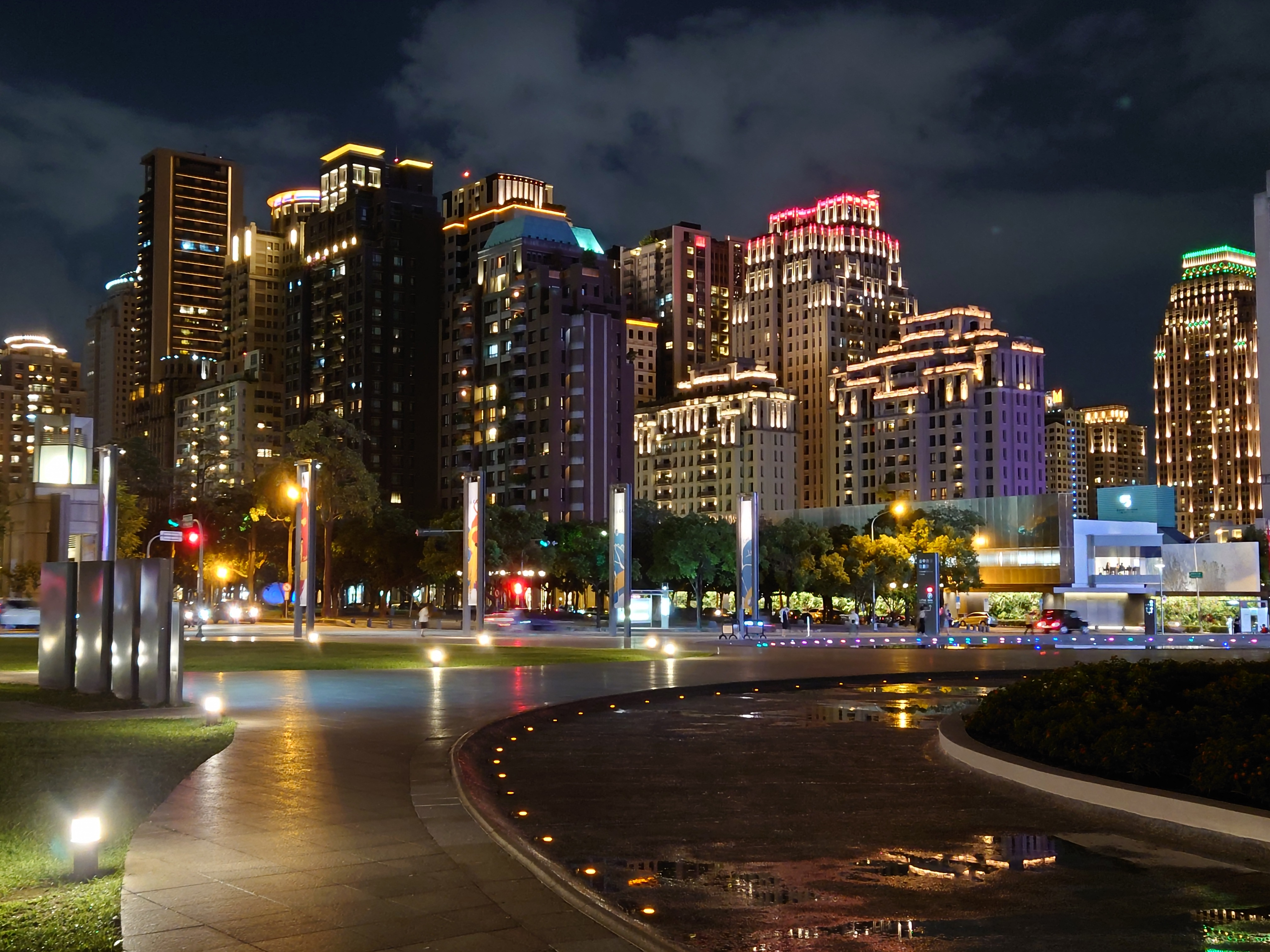
View at night

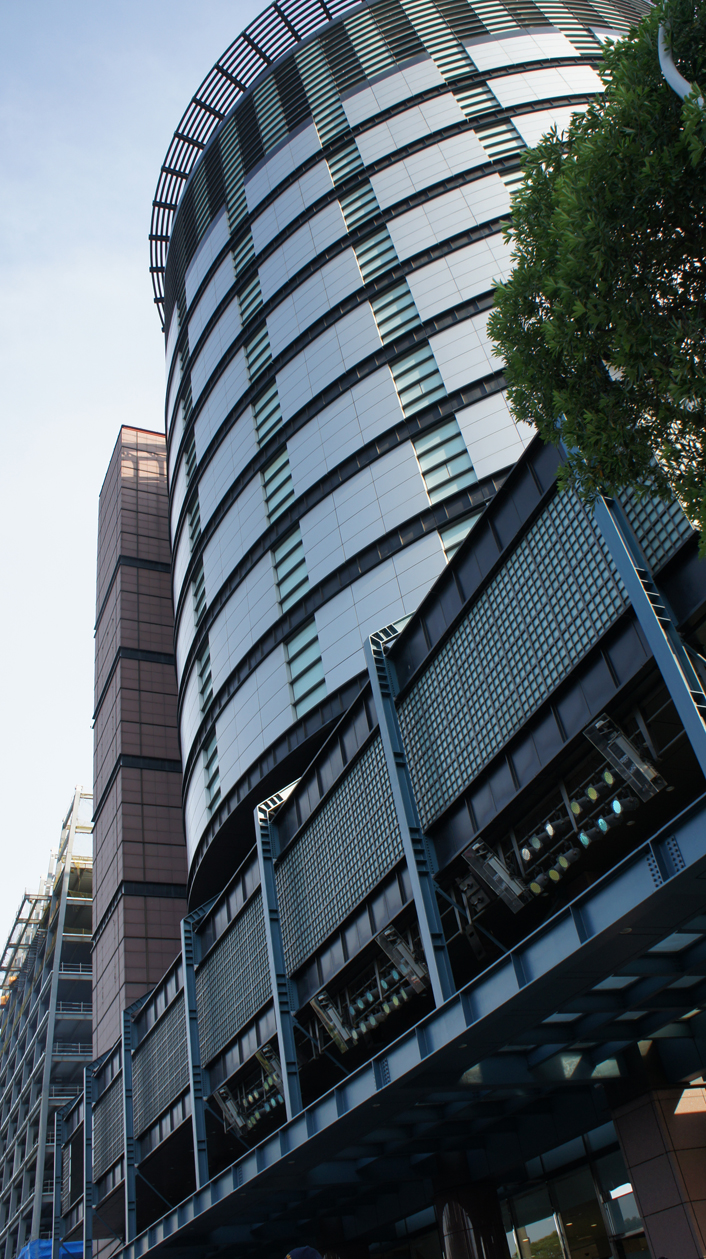
Shin Kong Mitsukoshi Taichung Store

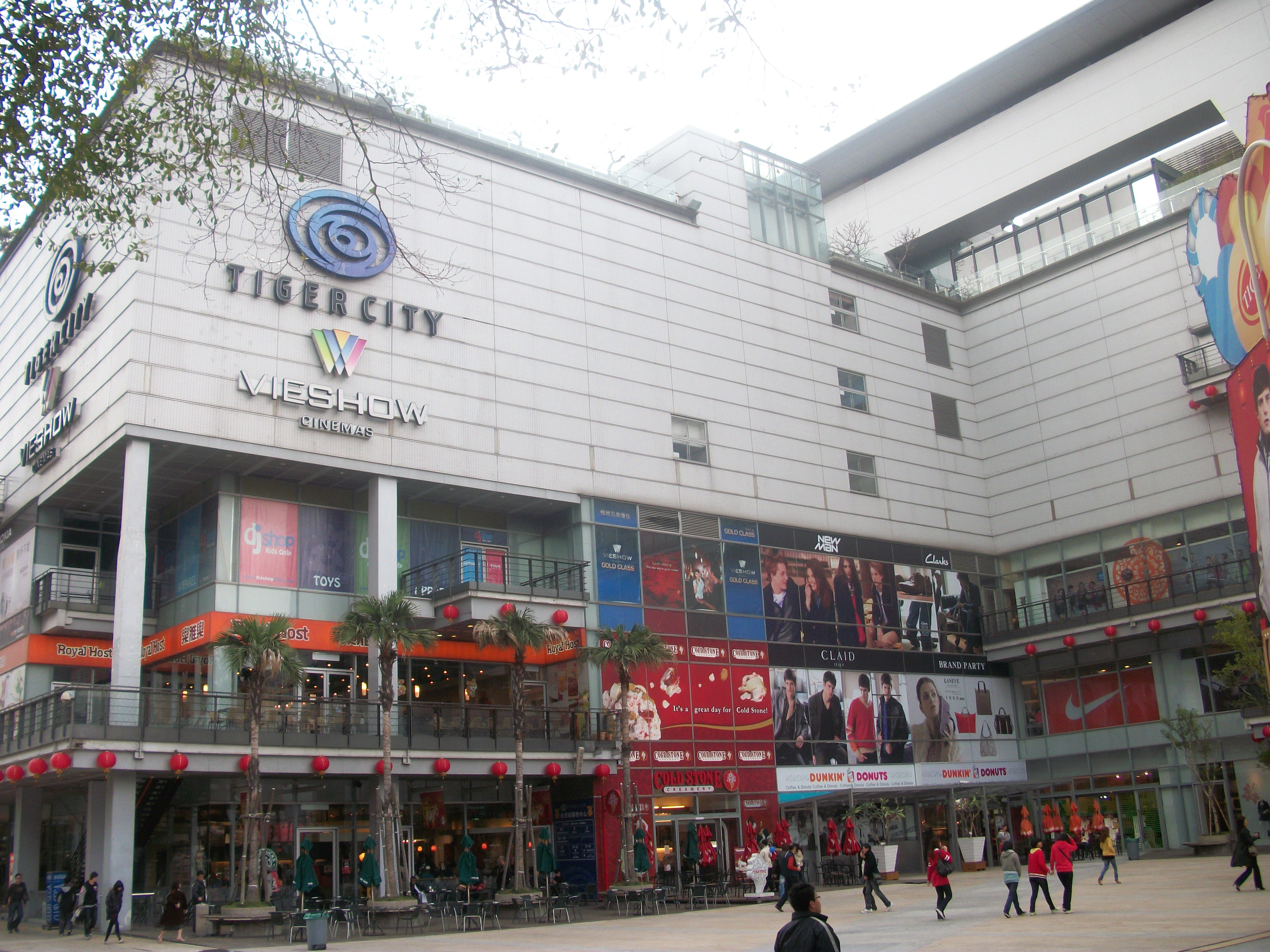
Tiger City

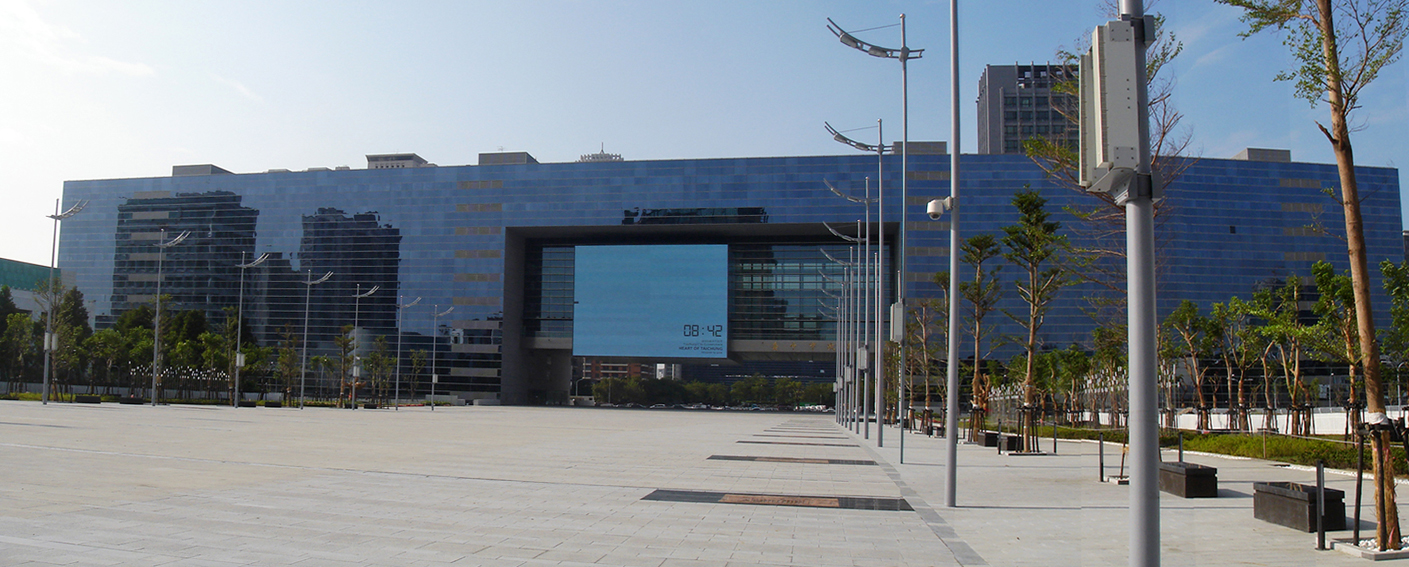
Taichung City Hall

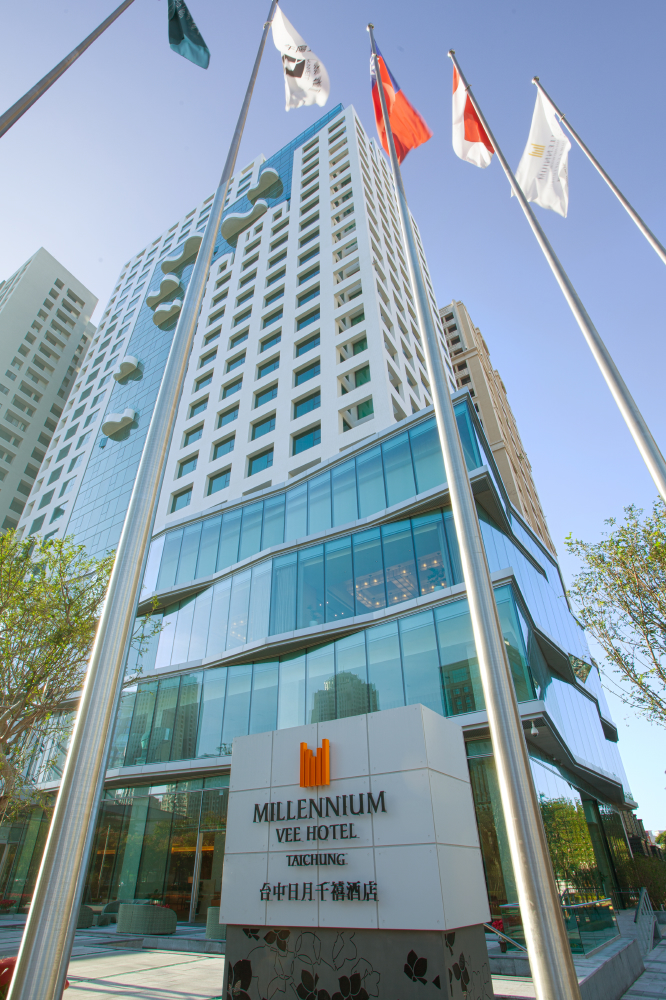
Millennium Hotel Taichung

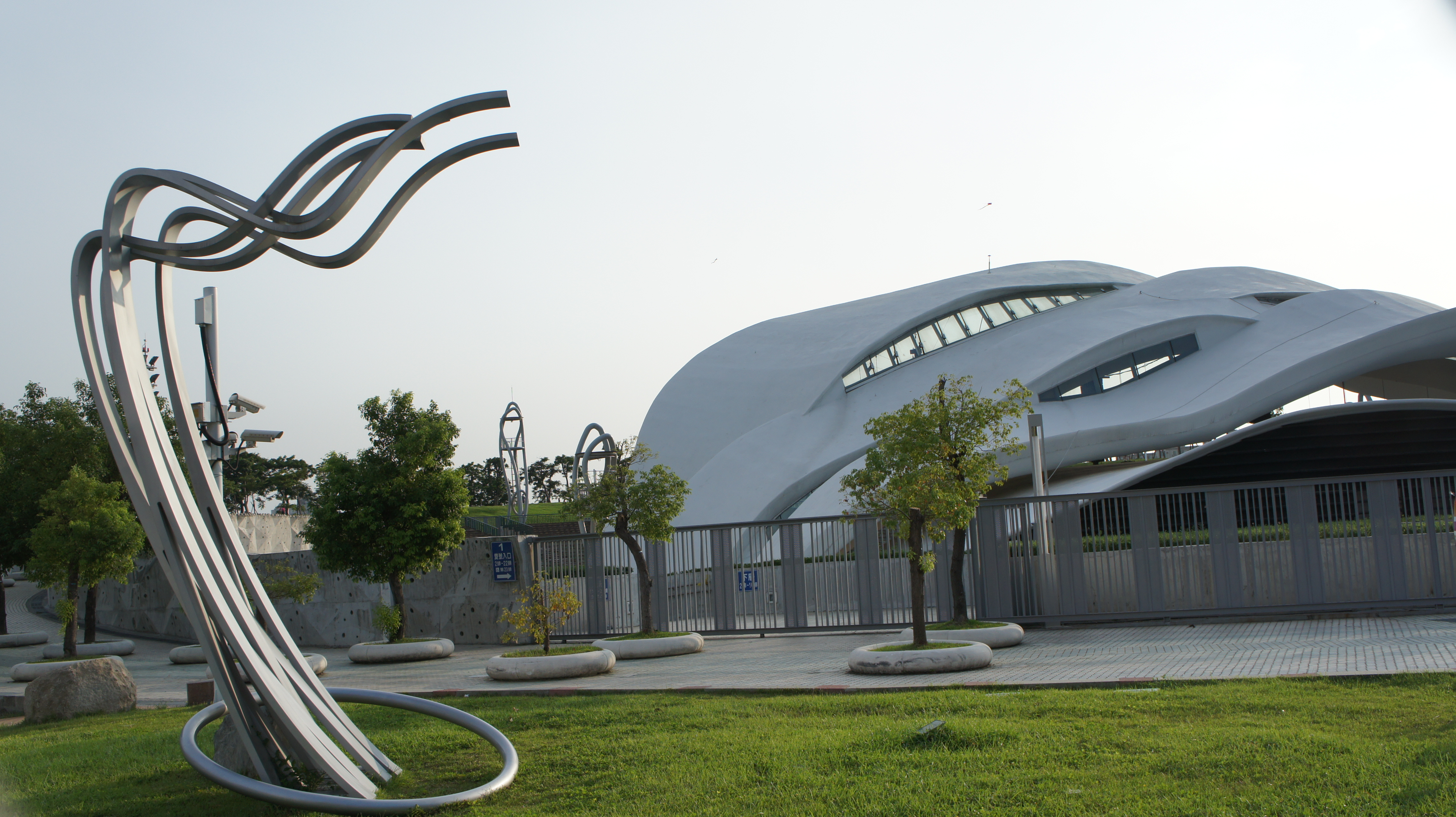
Fulfillment Amphitheater

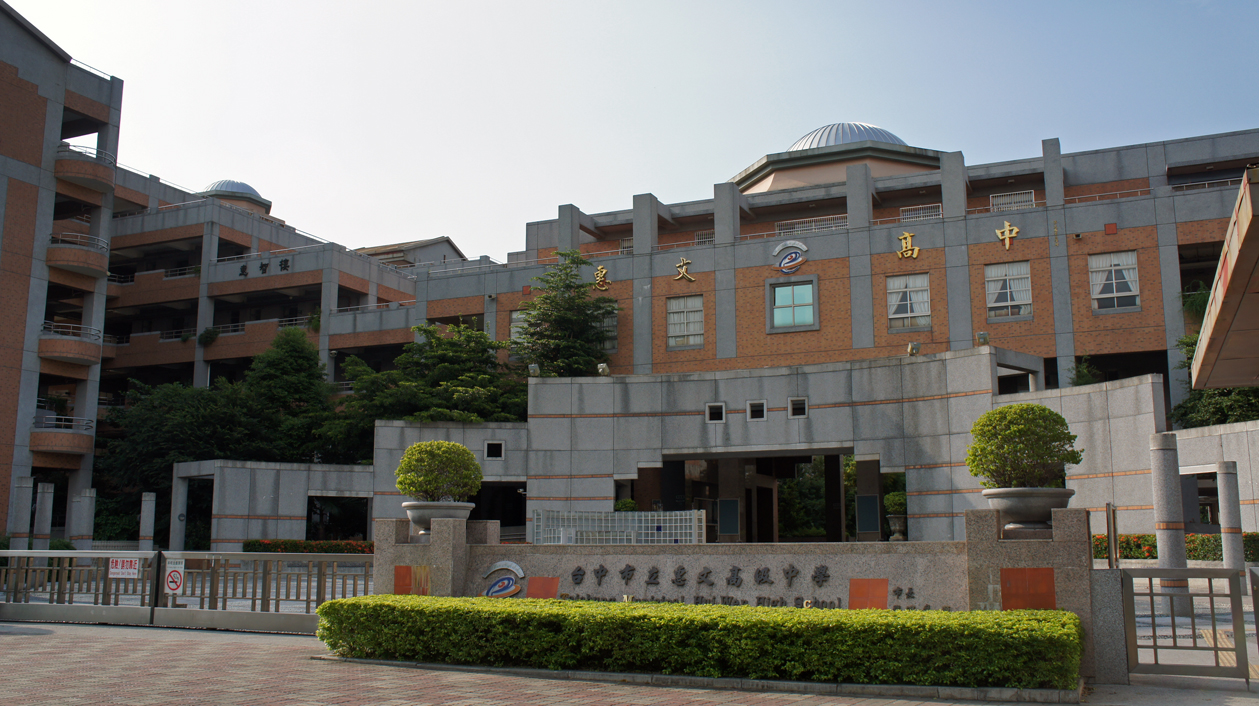
Taichung City Municipal Hui-Wen High School

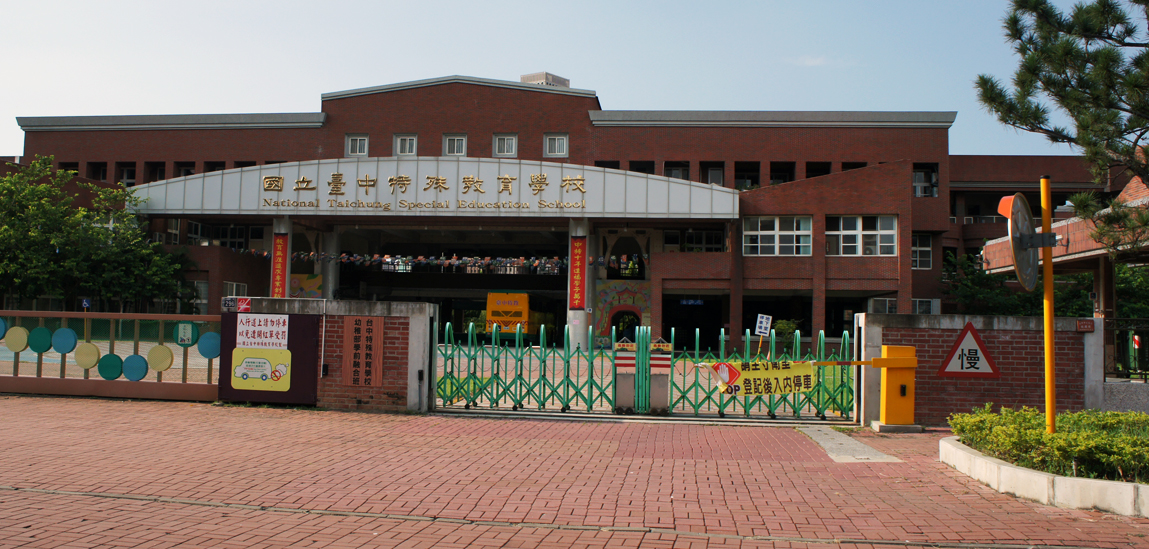
National Taichung Special Education School

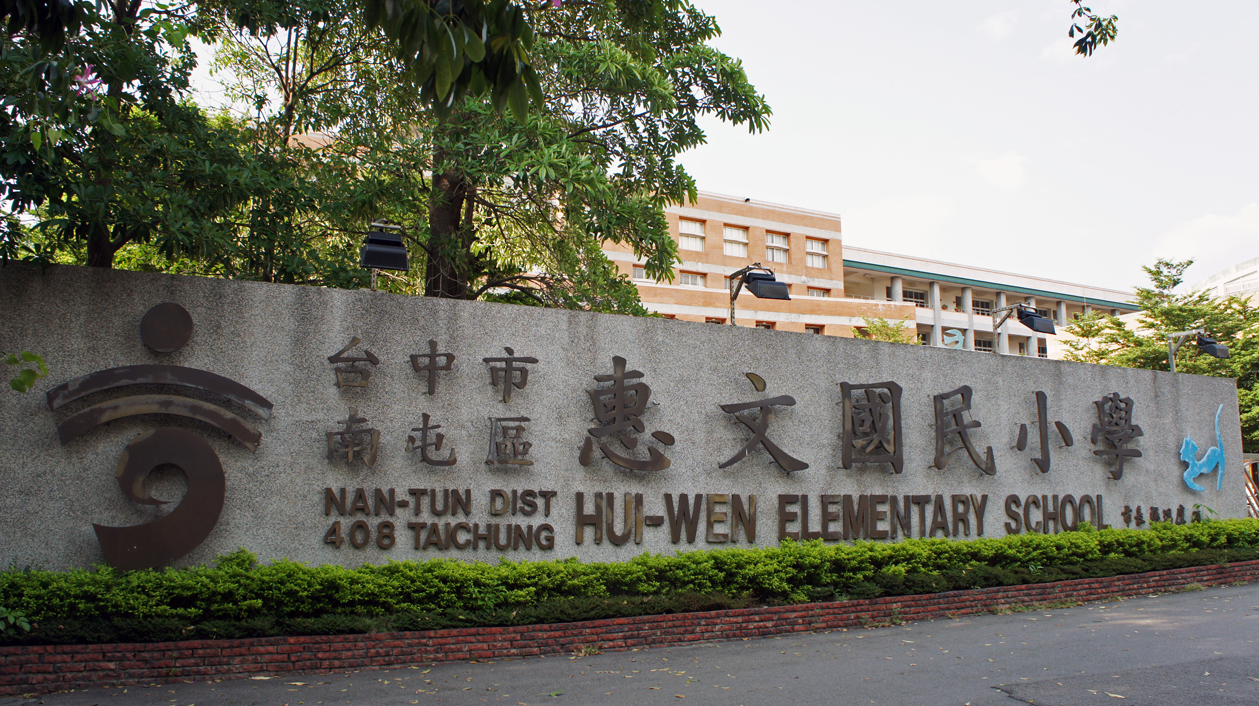
Hui-Wen Elementary School

== See also ==
- Huilai Monument Archaeology Park
- Liming New Village
- Urban renewal
