= Ding Sheng BHW Taiwan Central Plaza =

Skyscraper in Xitun, Taichung, Taiwan

Ding Sheng BHW Taiwan Central Plaza 興富發鼎盛BHW
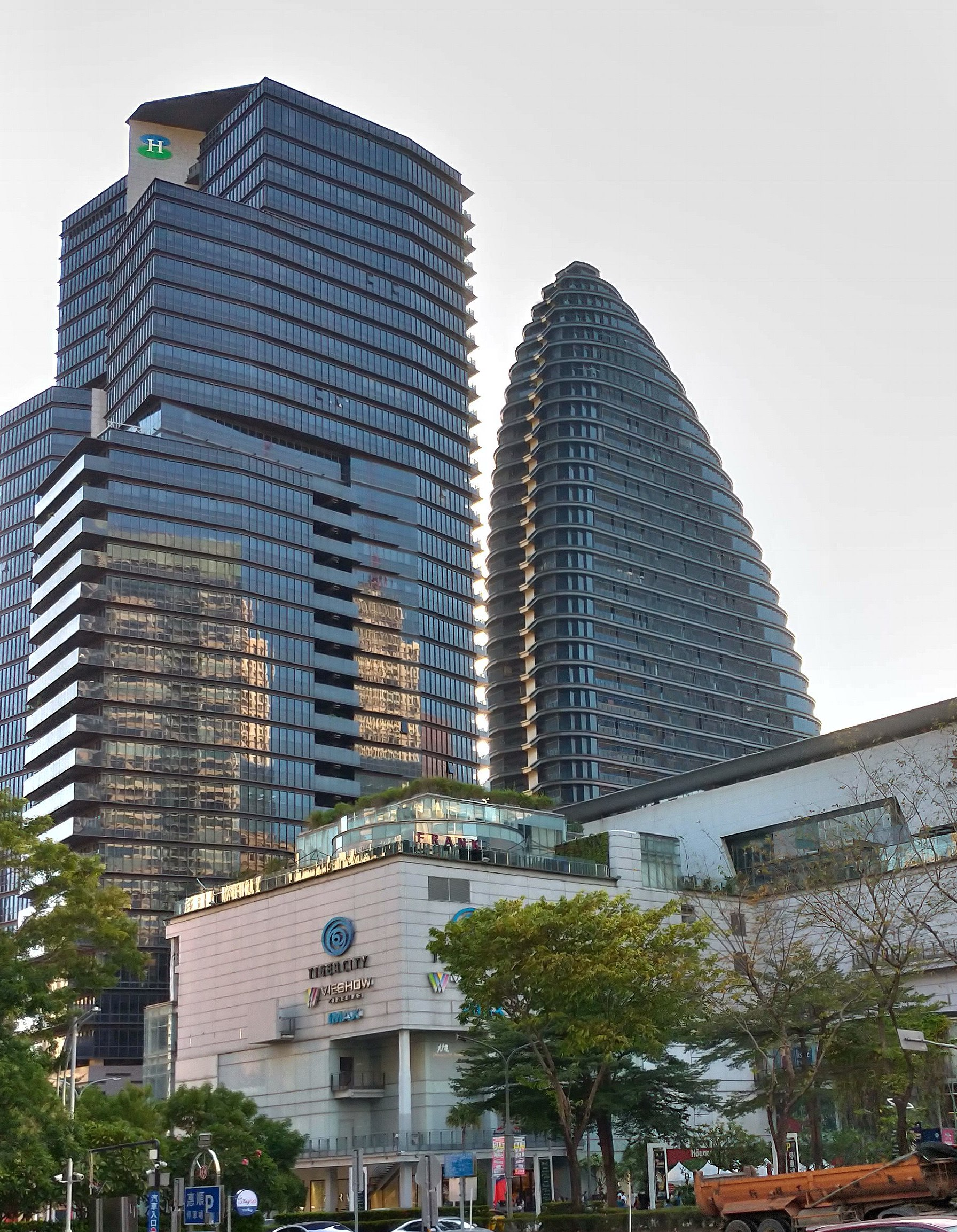
- Building on the left
- Interactive map of the Ding Sheng BHW Taiwan Central Plaza 興富發鼎盛BHW area

General information
- Status: Completed
- Type: Office
- Location: No. 238, Shizheng North 2nd Road, Xitun District, Taichung, Taiwan
- Coordinates: 24.163852732711646°N 120.63766684173042°E
- Construction started: 2012
- Completed: 2015

Height
- Architectural: 158.9 metres (521 ft)

Technical details
- Floor count: 36
- Floor area: 104,138 m^{2} (1,120,930 sq ft)

Design and construction
- Architects: EHS ArchiLab and Hsuyuan Kuo Architects & Associates

The Ding Sheng BHW Taiwan Central Plaza (Chinese: 興富發鼎盛BHW; pinyin: Xìng fù fā dǐngshèng BHW) is a skyscraper office building located in Taichung's 7th Redevelopment Zone, Xitun District, Taichung, Taiwan. The height of the building is 158.9 m (521 ft), the floor area is 104,138 m^{2} (1,120,930 sq ft), and it comprises 36 floors above ground, as well as six basement levels. Construction of the building began in 2012 and it was completed in 2015. The building is designed by EHS ArchiLab and Hsuyuan Kuo Architects & Associates and located next to the Tiger City shopping mall. As of February 2021, it is the 14th tallest building in Taichung and 43rd tallest in Taiwan.

== See also ==
- List of tallest buildings in Taiwan
- List of tallest buildings in Taichung
- Taichung's 7th Redevelopment Zone
- Tiger City
