= La Bella Vita (skyscraper) =

Residential skyscraper in Xitun, Taichung, Taiwan

La Bella Vita 麗格
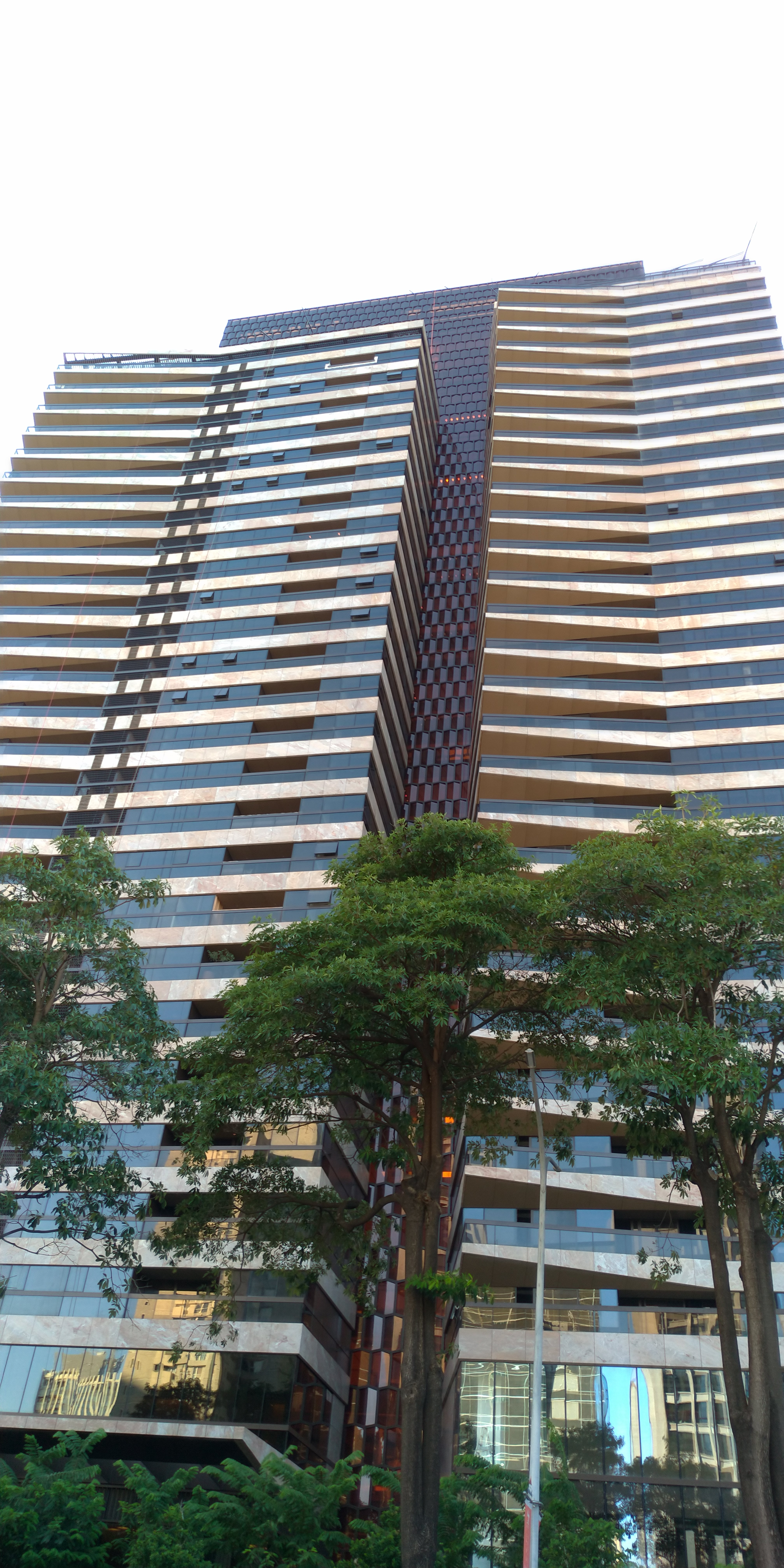
- Interactive map of the La Bella Vita 麗格 area

General information
- Status: Completed
- Type: Residential
- Location: No. 100, Section 1, Huizhong Road, Xitun District, Taichung, Taiwan
- Coordinates: 24°09′42″N 120°38′40″E
- Construction started: 2016
- Completed: 2020

Height
- Architectural: 128 m (420 ft)

Technical details
- Floor count: 33

Design and construction
- Architects: Antonio Citterio Patricia Viel and Partners

The La Bella Vita, also known as Huizhong Road Tower (Chinese: 麗格; pinyin: Lì gé), is a residential skyscraper located in Taichung's 7th Redevelopment Zone, Xitun District, Taichung, Taiwan. It is designed by Antonio Citterio Patricia Viel and Partners. The height of the building is 128 m (420 ft), and it comprises 33 floors above ground, as well as six basement levels.

== Design ==
Designed by the Milan-based architectural firm Antonio Citterio Patricia Viel and Partners (ACPV), the building combines Italian elements with Taiwanese culture, generating a tower composed of seemingly disjoint, yet complementary volumes, which symbolise the unique rock formations found in Taiwan. The exterior façade of La Bella Vita consists of a honeycomb-style crystalline-structured window that allows natural light into the building. The tower offers 168 residential units overlooking the cityscape of the fast-emerging Taichung's 7th Redevelopment Zone.

== See also ==
- List of tallest buildings in Taiwan
- List of tallest buildings in Taichung
- Taichung's 7th Redevelopment Zone
- Antonio Citterio
- Treasure Garden
