= T-Power (skyscraper) =

Skyscraper office building in Xitun, Taichung, Taiwan

T-Power 親家市政廣場
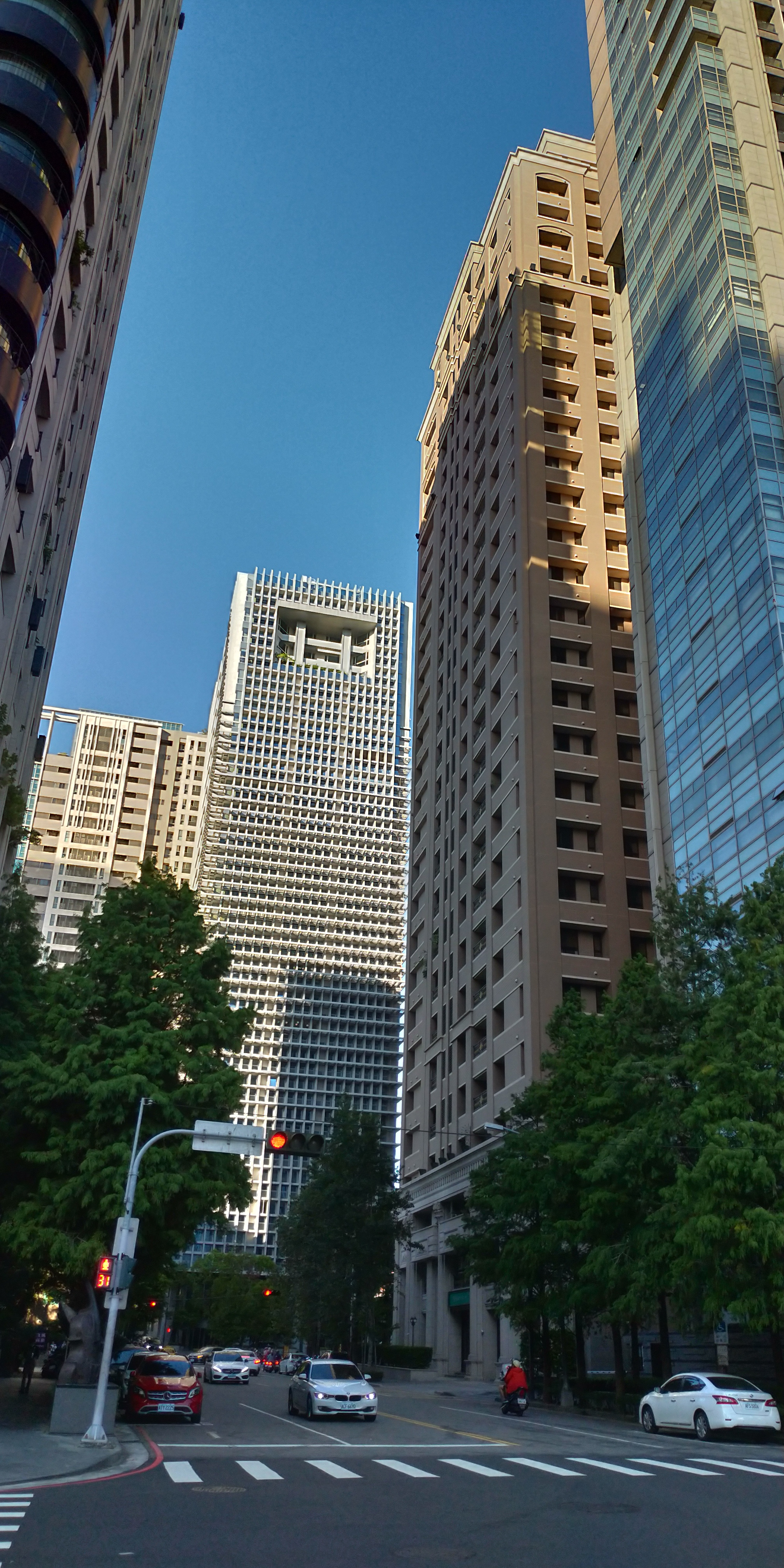
- Interactive map of the T-Power 親家市政廣場 area

General information
- Status: Completed
- Type: Office
- Location: No.186, Shizheng North 7th Road, Xitun District, Taichung, Taiwan
- Coordinates: 24.167282620919003°N 120.64061362324092°E
- Completed: 2018

Height
- Architectural: 125.6 m (412 ft)

Technical details
- Floor count: 28
- Floor area: 30,911 m^{2} (332,720 sq ft)

The T-Power (Chinese: 親家市政廣場; pinyin: Qīn jiā shìzhèng guǎngchǎng) is a skyscraper office building located in Taichung's 7th Redevelopment Zone, Xitun District, Taichung, Taiwan. The building was completed in 2018. The height of the building is 125.6 m (412 ft), the floor area is 30,911 m^{2} (332,720 sq ft), and it comprises 28 floors above ground, as well as seven basement levels.

== See also ==
- List of tallest buildings in Taiwan
- List of tallest buildings in Taichung
- Taichung's 7th Redevelopment Zone
