= National Trade Center =

Skyscraper in Xitun, Taichung, Taiwan

National Trade Center NTC國家商貿中心
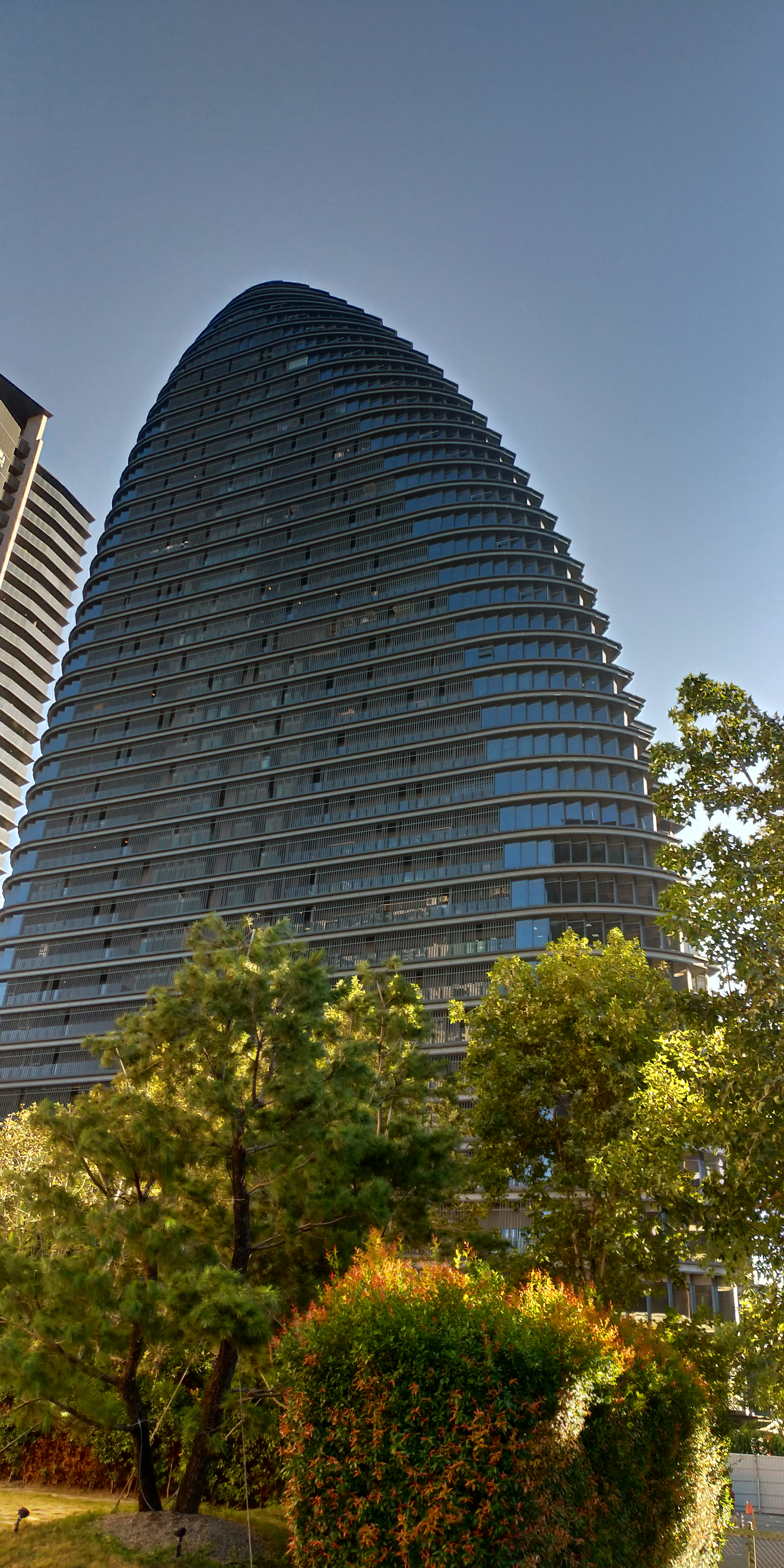
- Interactive map of the National Trade Center; NTC國家商貿中心 area

General information
- Status: Completed
- Type: Office
- Location: Xitun District, Taichung, Taiwan
- Coordinates: 24°09′43″N 120°37′55″E
- Construction started: 2015
- Completed: 2018

Height
- Architectural: 165.65 metres (543.5 ft)
- Tip: 169.6 metres (556 ft)

Technical details
- Floor count: 34
- Floor area: 52,924 m^{2} (569,670 sq ft)

Design and construction
- Architect: Aedas

The National Trade Center (Chinese: NTC國家商貿中心; pinyin: NTC guójiā shāngmào zhōngxīn) is a skyscraper located in Xitun District, Taichung, Taiwan. As of December 2020, it is the 6th tallest building in Taichung and 24th tallest in Taiwan. The height of the building is 165.65 m (543.5 ft), the floor area is 52,924 m^{2} (569,670 sq ft), and it comprises 34 floors above ground, as well as eight basement levels.

== Design ==
Designed by the international architectural firm Aedas, the shape of the building is like a spring bamboo shoot, which symbolises the prosperity of Taichung. Its streamline design is particularly unique among the settlements dominated by rectangular buildings in Xitun District.

== See also ==
- List of tallest buildings in Taiwan
- List of tallest buildings in Taichung
- National Financial Center
