= Fulfillment Amphitheater =

Outdoor amphitheater in Nantun, Taichung, Taiwan

- 圓滿戶外劇場

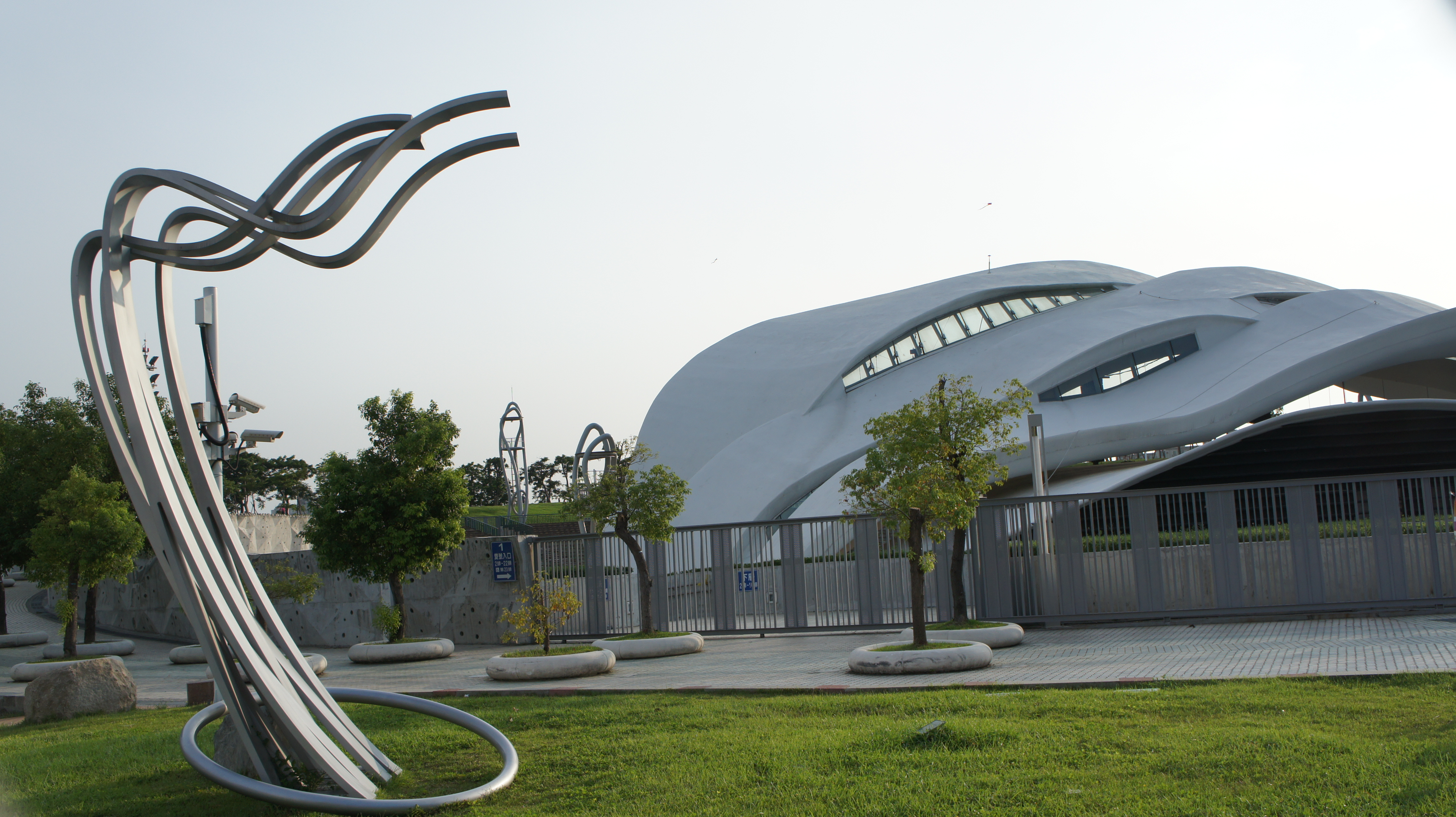
- Interactive map of Fulfillment Amphitheater
- Location: Nantun, Taichung, Taiwan
- Coordinates: 24.1450°N 120.6450°E
- Operator: Cultural Affairs Bureau of Taichung City Government
- Capacity: 6,000 audiences
- Type: Amphitheater

Construction
- Architect: Makoto Sei Watanabe

The Fulfillment Amphitheater (Chinese: 圓滿戶外劇場; pinyin: Yuánmǎn Hùwài Jùchǎng) is a large-scale outdoor amphitheater in Wen-Hsin Forest Park on Wenxin Road, Nantun District, Taichung, Taiwan. Every year, Taichung City Government holds "MidTaiwan Lantern Festival" here.

== Overview ==
The Fulfillment Amphitheater is managed by the Taichung City Cultural Affairs Bureau. The built-in Amphitheater stage is an open performance space ranging between 40 and 51 meters wide. The stage has a length of 18 meters covered by a roof that ranges in height from 9.5 to 11.5 meters. The 363.638 square meters backstage area is constructed with three concrete layers, with steel used in the middle layer. The whole facility covers 816.5326 square meters and has 6,036 general seats, +20 seats for the disabled, distributed among three floors. However, the surrounding grass areas mean that audiences of up to 15,000 people can be accommodated.

Since August 5, 2006, a wide variety of artistic and cultural events have been held here, with a one-year hiatus when the Amphitheater roof was being constructed. This public space has is a venue for cultural and recreational activities in Taichung, and has served to increase the general public’s participation in arts and cultural events.

== Location and surrounding neighborhood ==
The size of this facility is about 8.86 hectares. Located in the city’s Nantun District, it is in the vicinity of the fifth and seventh redevelopment zones, and can be accessed via Wenxin Road, Xiangshang Road, Section 2, Dadun 7th Street and Huiwen Road, putting it less than 15 minutes away from the Taichung High Speed Rail station and national freeway network.

The Daxin Elementary School, Chunghwa Telecom Building, Huiwen Flower Market and multiple restaurants are all within walking walking distance.

== See also ==
- Nantun District
