= Taichung City Hall metro station =

Metro station in Taichung, Taiwan

Taichung City Hall 110 市政府
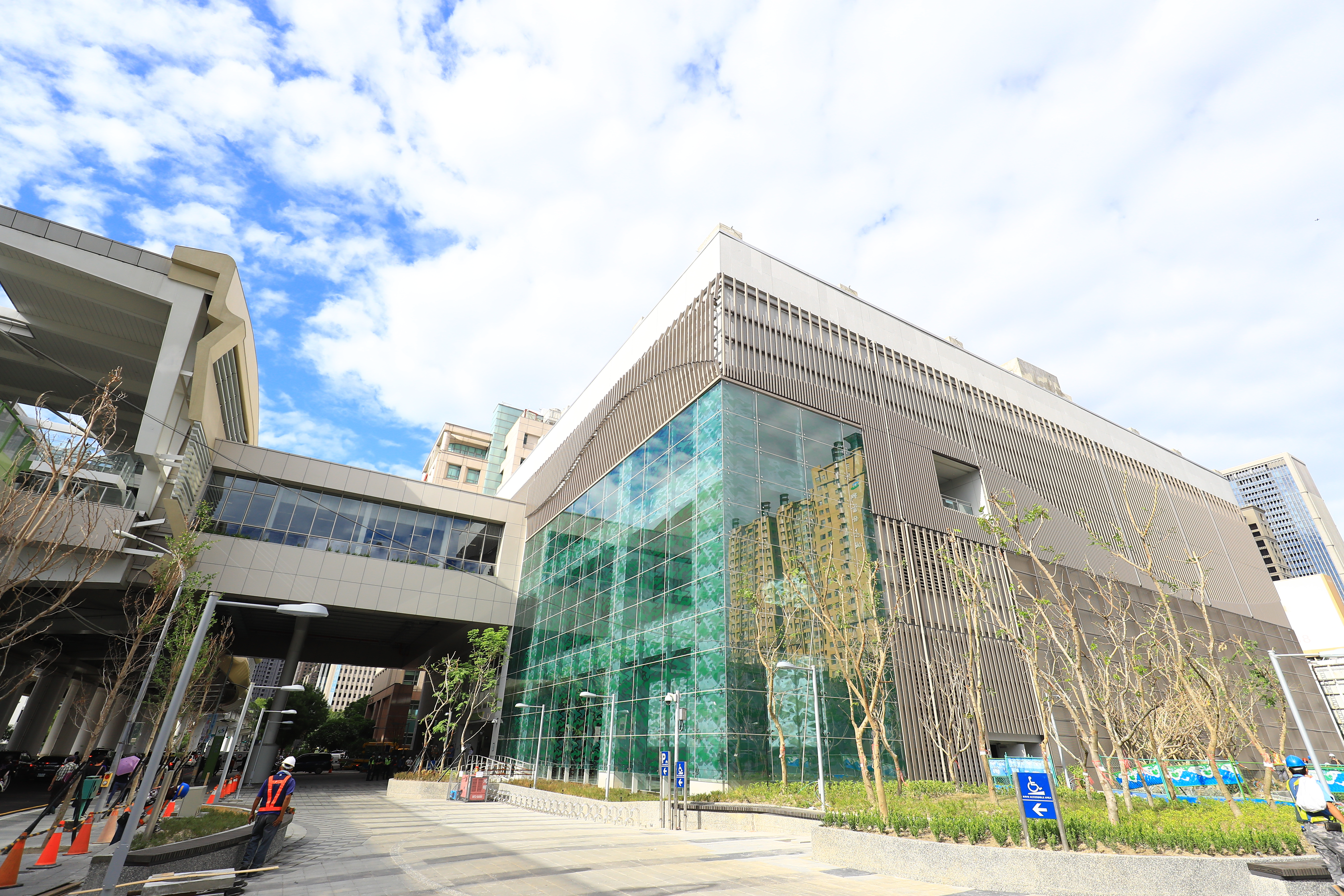

General information
- Location: Xitun, Taichung; Taiwan
- Coordinates: 24°9′43.999″N 120°38′57.998″E
- Operator: Taichung MRT
- Line: Green line
- Platforms: 2 side platforms

Construction
- Structure type: Elevated

Other information
- Station code: 110

History
- Opened: 25 April 2021

Services
Preceding station	Taichung MRT	Following station
Shui-an Temple towards HSR Taichung Station	Green line	Wenxin Yinghua towards Beitun Main
Location

Taichung City Hall metro station
- Chinese: 市政府站
Transcriptions
Standard Mandarin
- Hanyu Pinyin: Shìzhèngfǔ Zhàn
- Bopomofo: ㄕˋ ㄓㄥˋ ㄈㄨˇ ㄓㄢˋ
- Tongyong Pinyin: Shìhjhèngfǔ Jhàn

Taichung City Hall is a metro station operated by Taichung MRT located in Xitun District, Taichung, Taiwan. It is on the Green line. The planned Blue line will intersect with the Green line at this station.

== Around the station ==
The station is at the intersection of Taiwan Boulevard and Wenxin Road, two major thoroughfares of Taichung City. It serves the city's "7th Redevelopment Zone", the commercial center of the city. Taichung City Hall, the station's namesake, is located nearby.

Two mixed-use buildings were being constructed to the east and west of the station in 2019.

== Station layout ==
4F	Crossover level	Platforms-connecting overpass
3F
3F	Side platform, doors will open on the right
3F	Track 1	Green line: towards HSR Taichung Station (Shui-an Temple)
3F	Track 2	Green line: towards Beitun Main (Wenxin Yinghua)
3F	Side platform, doors will open on the right
3F	Concourse
3F	Concourse	Lobby, information desk, automatic ticket dispensing machines, one-way faregates
2F	Mezzanine	Transitlink floor for stairs and escalators
1F	Street level	Exit/entrance
