= Tiger City =

- 老虎城購物中心

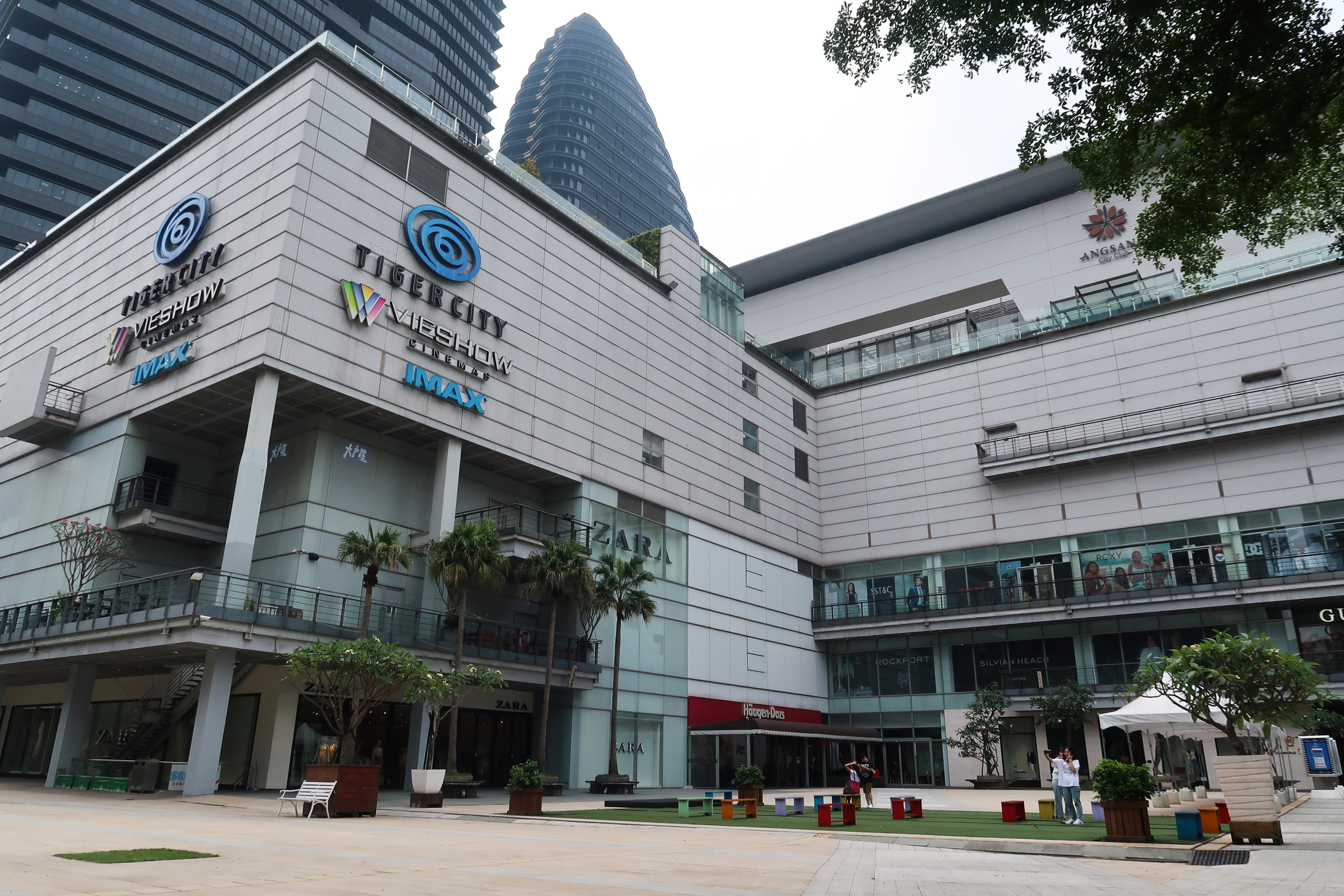
- Location: No. 120, Section 3, Henan Road, Xitun District, Taichung, Taiwan
- Coordinates: 24°09′51.2″N 120°38′18.07″E
- Opened: January 16, 2002
- Manager: B&B INTERNATIONAL DEVELOPMENT CO., LTD
- Floor area: 48,972 m^{2} (527,130 sq ft)
- Floors: 7 floors above ground 4 floors below ground
- Website: www.tigercity.com.tw

Tiger City (Chinese: 老虎城購物中心; pinyin: Lǎohǔ chéng gòuwù zhòng xīn) is a shopping center in Taichung's 7th Redevelopment Zone, Xitun District, Taichung, Taiwan that opened on January 16, 2002.

== History ==
- On January 16, 2002, the Tiger City Shopping Center, which was built at a cost of NT$3.5 billion, was officially opened.
- In 2006, Tiger City planned to spend NT$2.6 billion to build an amusement park next to the mall, of which NT$500 million was planned to be used to build a 105 m (344 ft)-high Ferris wheel, and the remaining NT$2.1 billion to build another 10,000 m^{2} (110,000 sq ft) shopping mall. It was expected to be completed in 2008. However, the expansion plan was later cancelled and replaced, with other builders being contracted to build a 159 m (522 ft) skyscraper building - Ding Sheng BHW Taiwan Central Plaza.
- On October 13, 2016, the Taichung International Animation Film Festival debuted at Tiger City.

== Stores ==
- Zara
- Sega
- Toys "R" Us
- Vieshow Cinemas

== Gallery ==
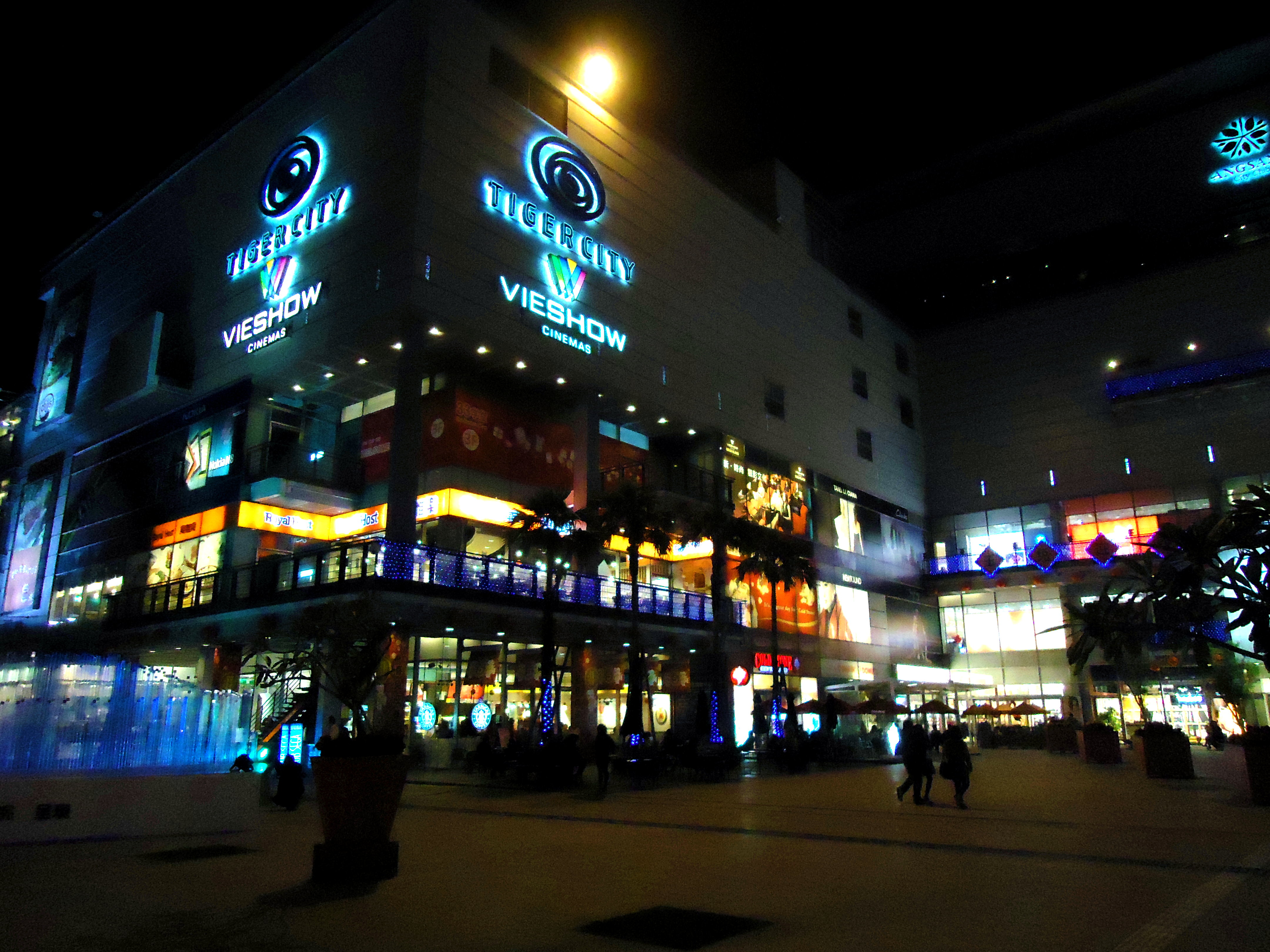
At night

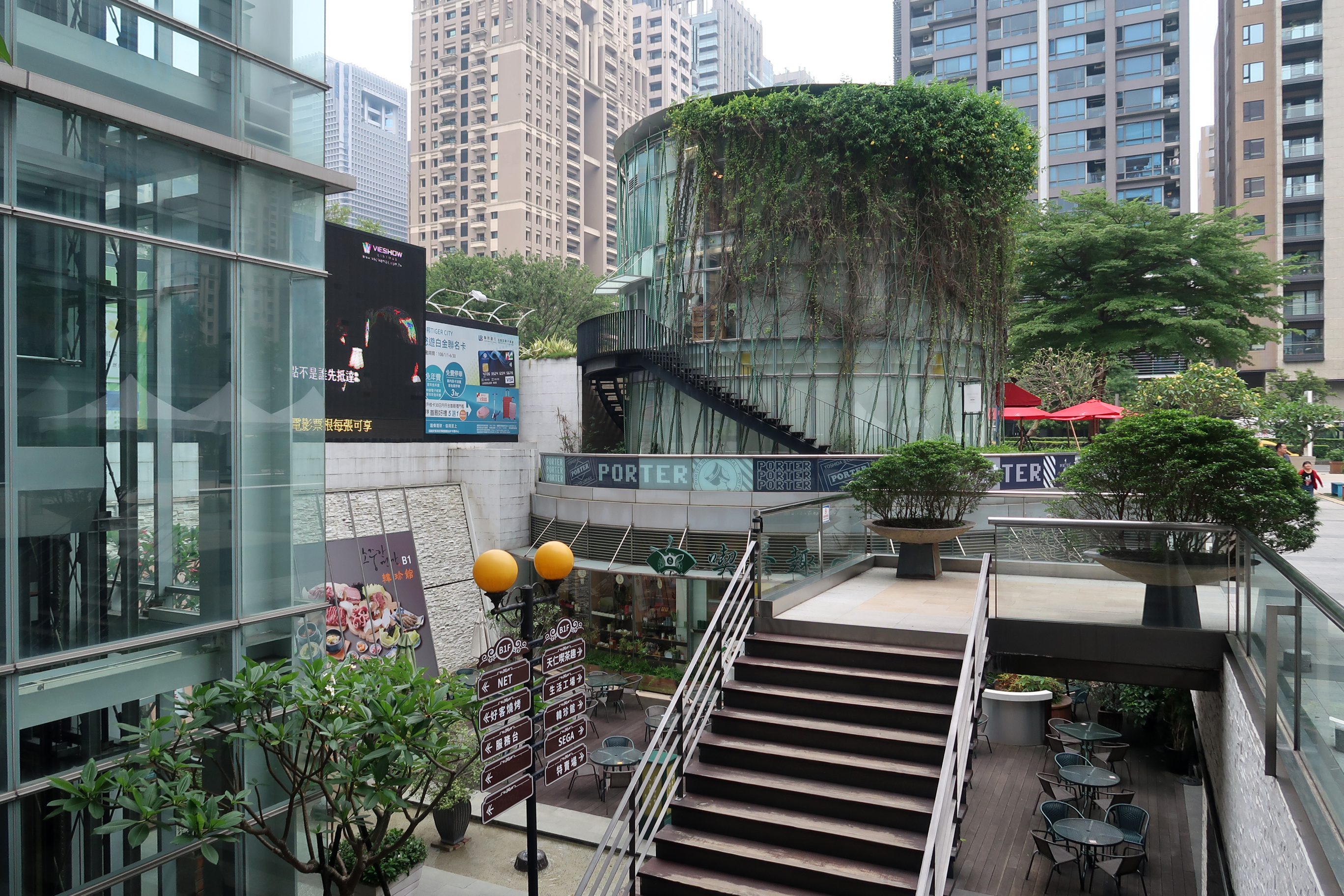
Square

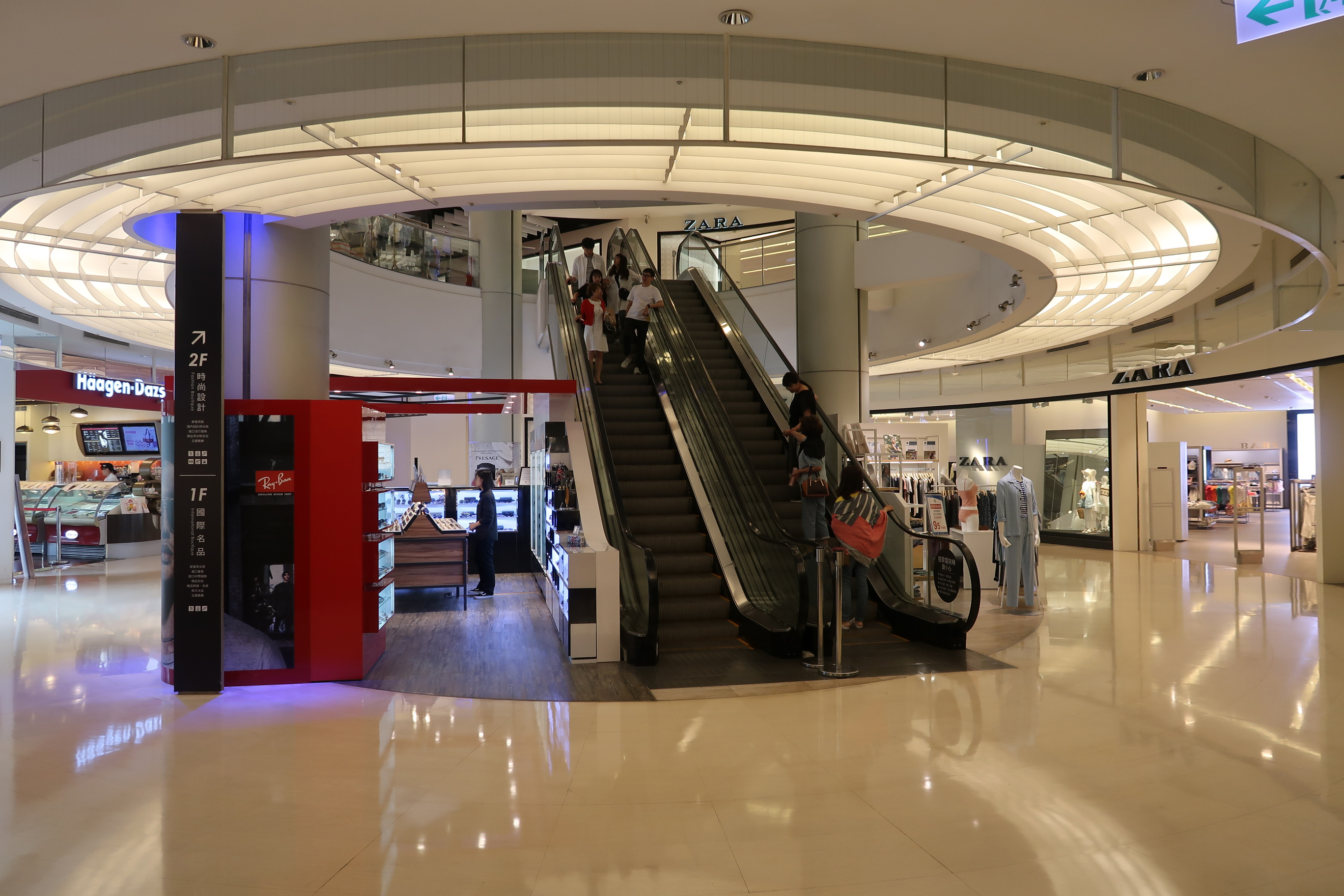
Level 1

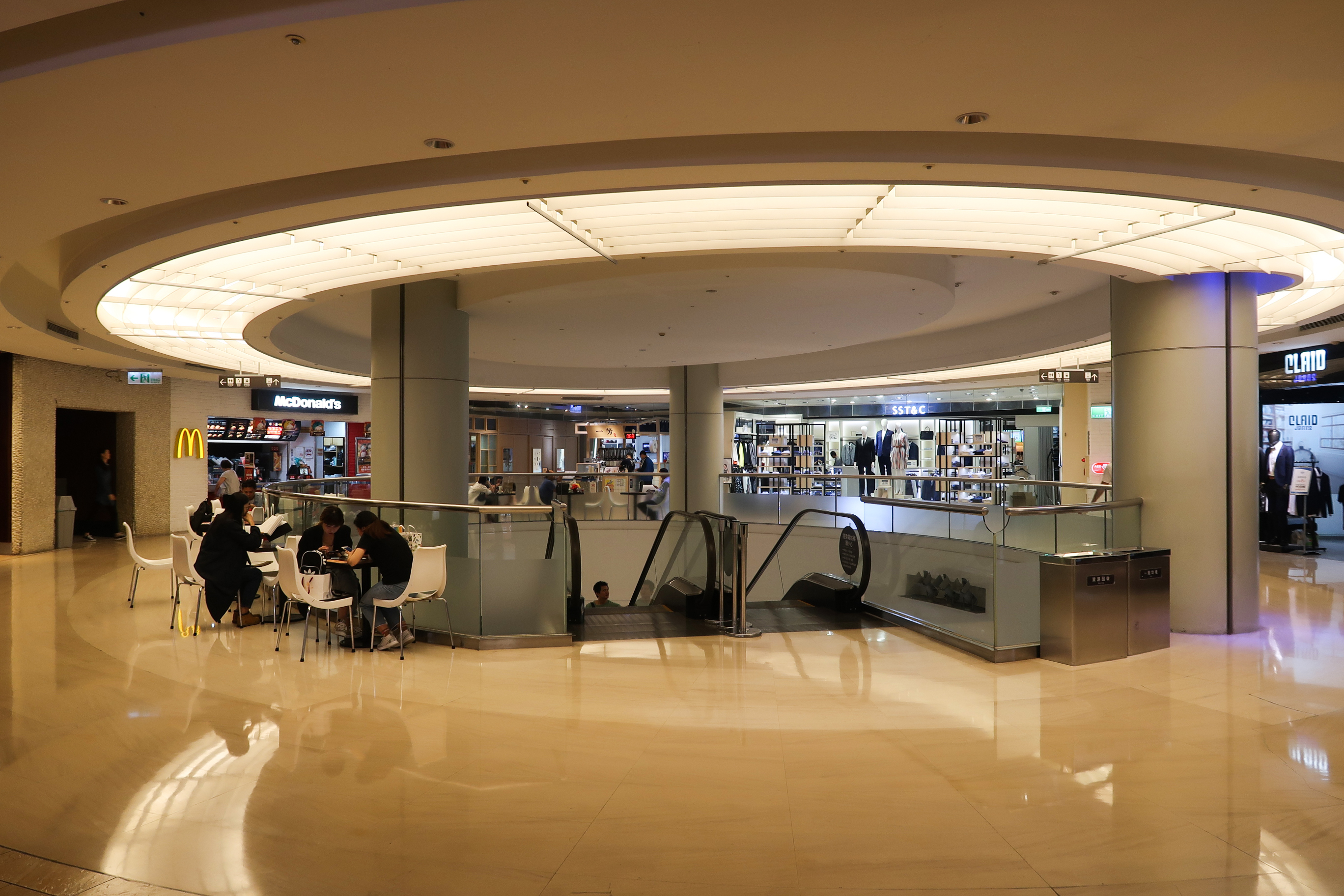
Level 3

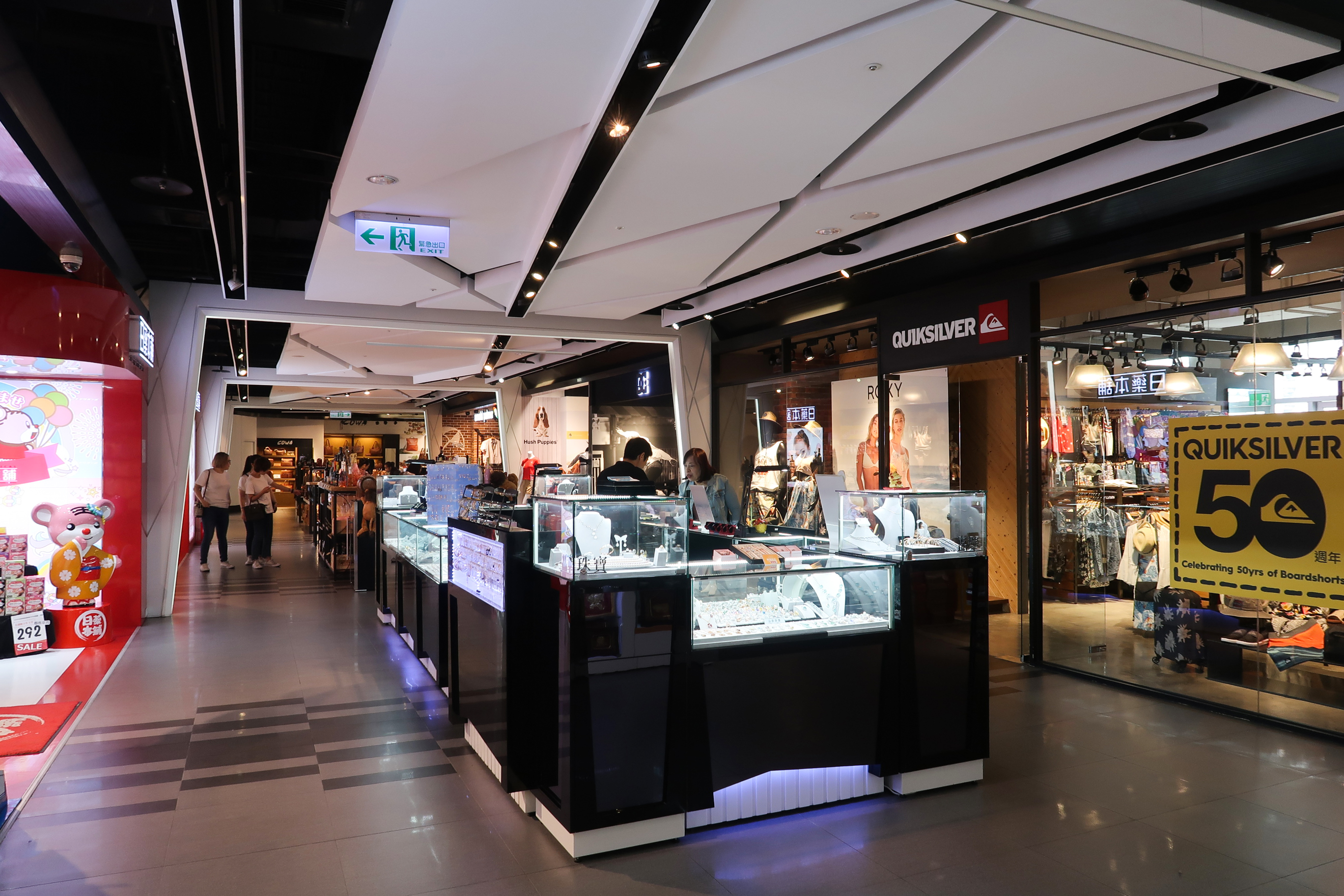
Level 3

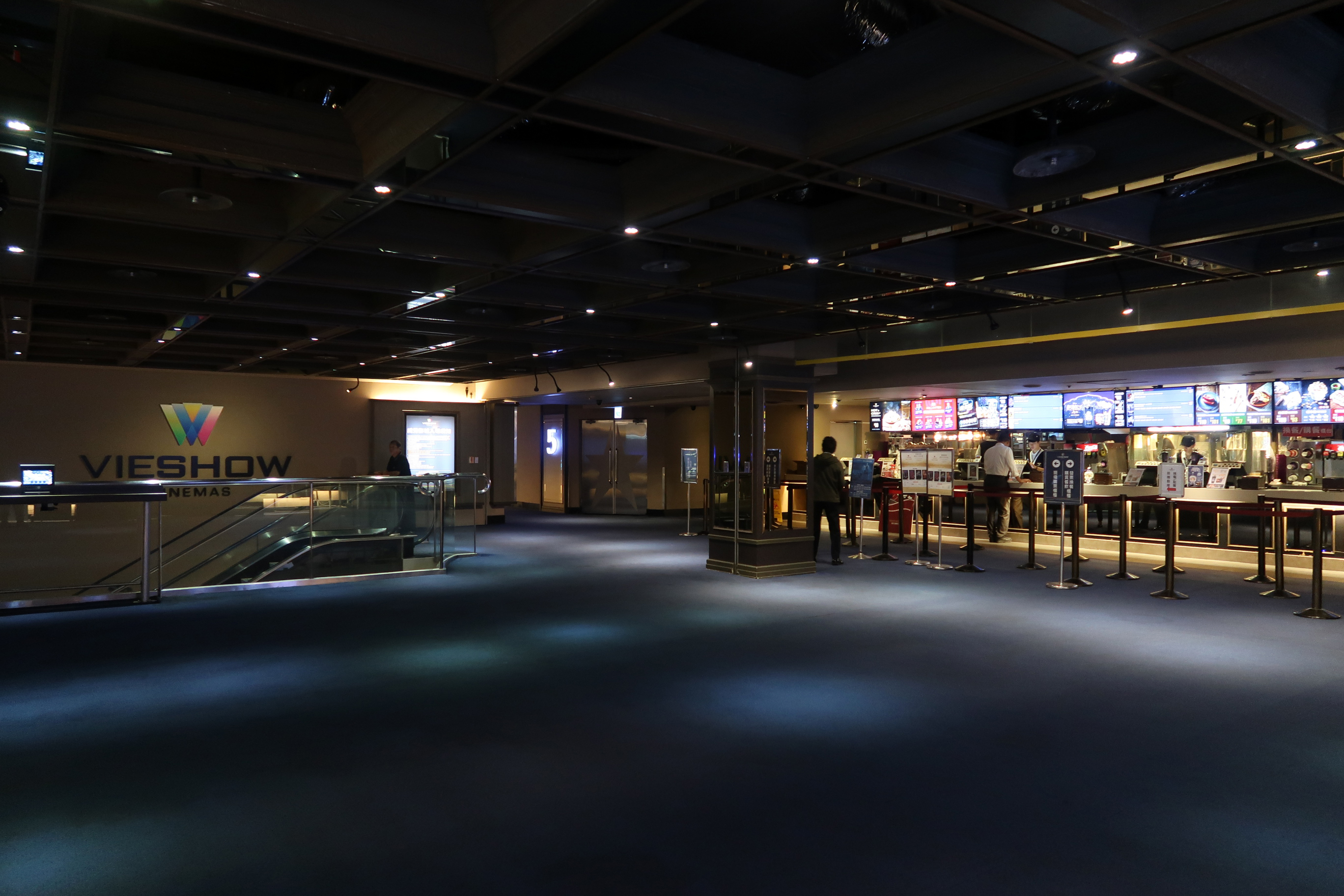
Level 4 Vieshow Cinemas

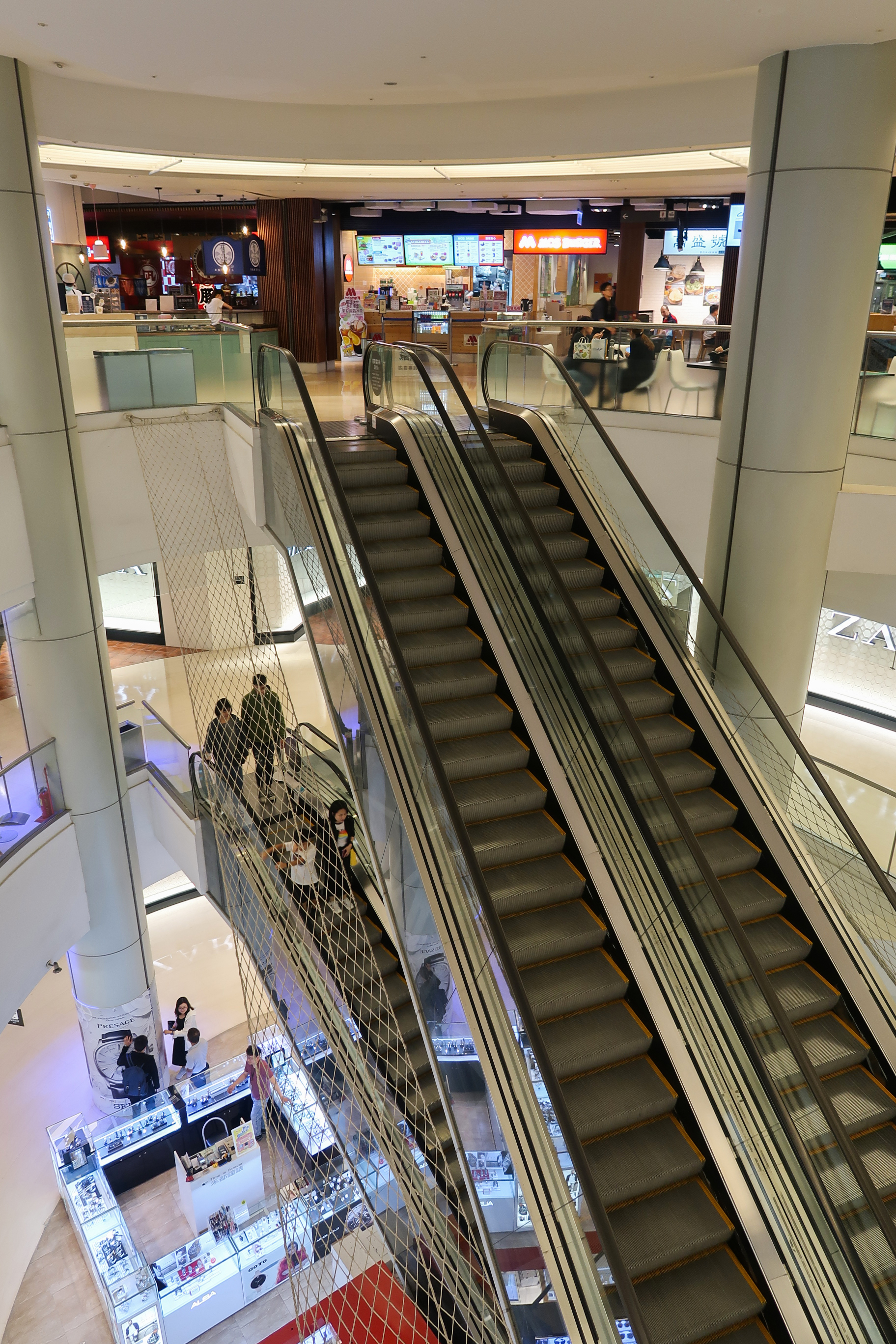
Void

== See also ==
- List of tourist attractions in Taiwan
- Taichung's 7th Redevelopment Zone
- Mitsui Outlet Park Taichung
- Park Lane by CMP
