= Chaoma Sports Center =

Sport center in Xitun, Taichung, Taiwan

- 朝馬國民運動中心
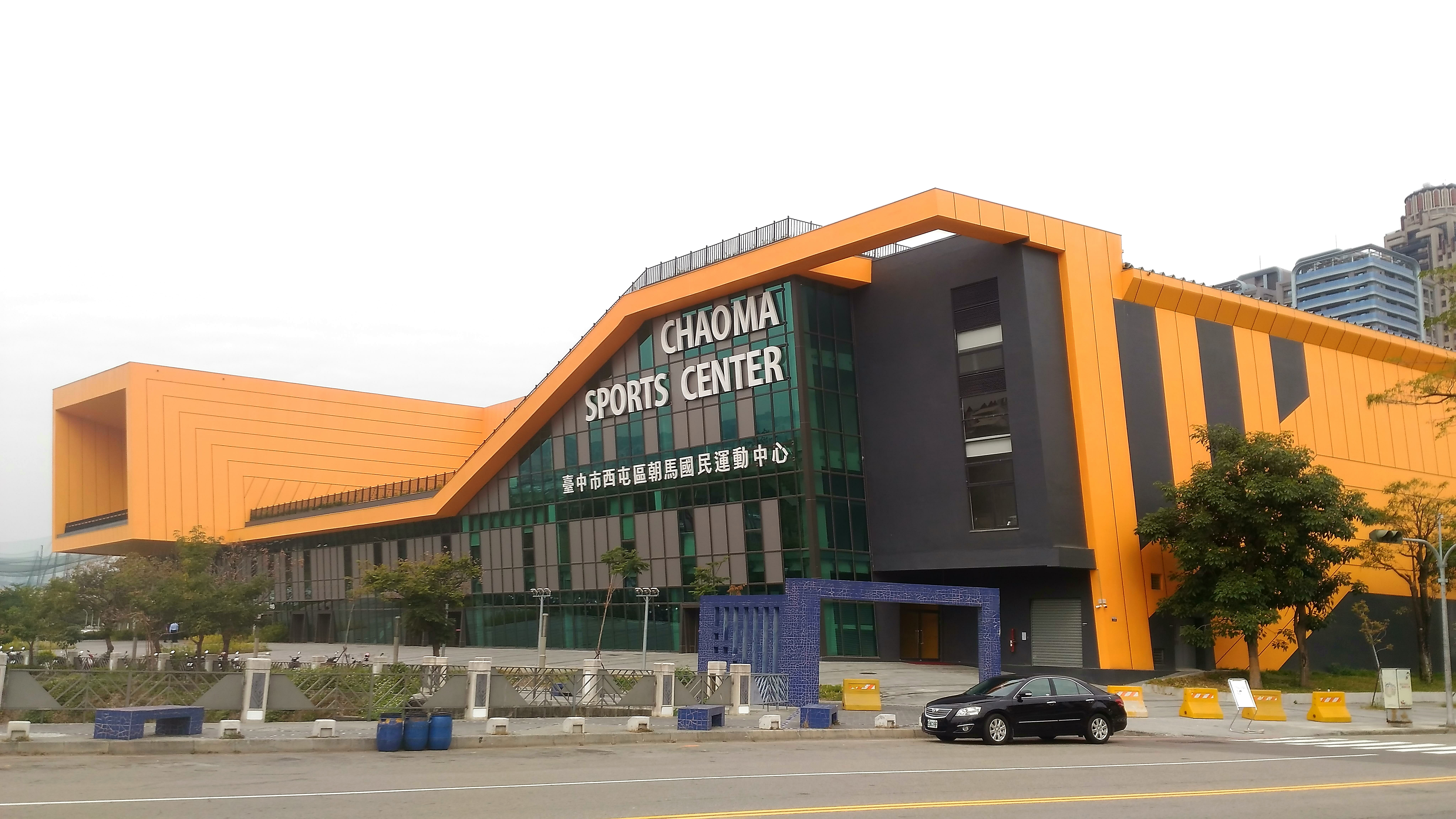
- Interactive map of Chaoma Sports Center
- Location: Xitun, Taichung, Taiwan
- Coordinates: 24°10′N 120°38′E
- Operator: China Youth Corp
- Type: sport center

Construction
- Groundbreaking: August 2014
- Built: April 2016
- Opened: 30 December 2016
- Cost: NT$400 million

Website
- Official website (in Chinese)

The Chaoma Sports Center (traditional Chinese: 朝馬國民運動中心; simplified Chinese: 朝马国民运动中心; pinyin: Cháomǎ Guómín Yùndòng Zhōngxīn) is a sport center in Xitun District, Taichung, Taiwan.

== History ==
The construction of the sport center began in August 2014 and completed in April 2016. On 7 December 2016, Taichung Mayor Lin Chia-lung inspected the venue hoping that the venue would provide a training center for professional athletes and develop Taichung residents sporting habit. The sport center underwent trial opening on 20-26 December 2016 and was officially opened to the public on 30 December 2016.

== Architecture ==
- Badminton court
- Swimming pool

== See also ==
- Sports in Taiwan
