= Bridge Upto Zenith =

Residential skyscraper in Banqiao, New Taipei, Taiwan

- 世界花園橋峰
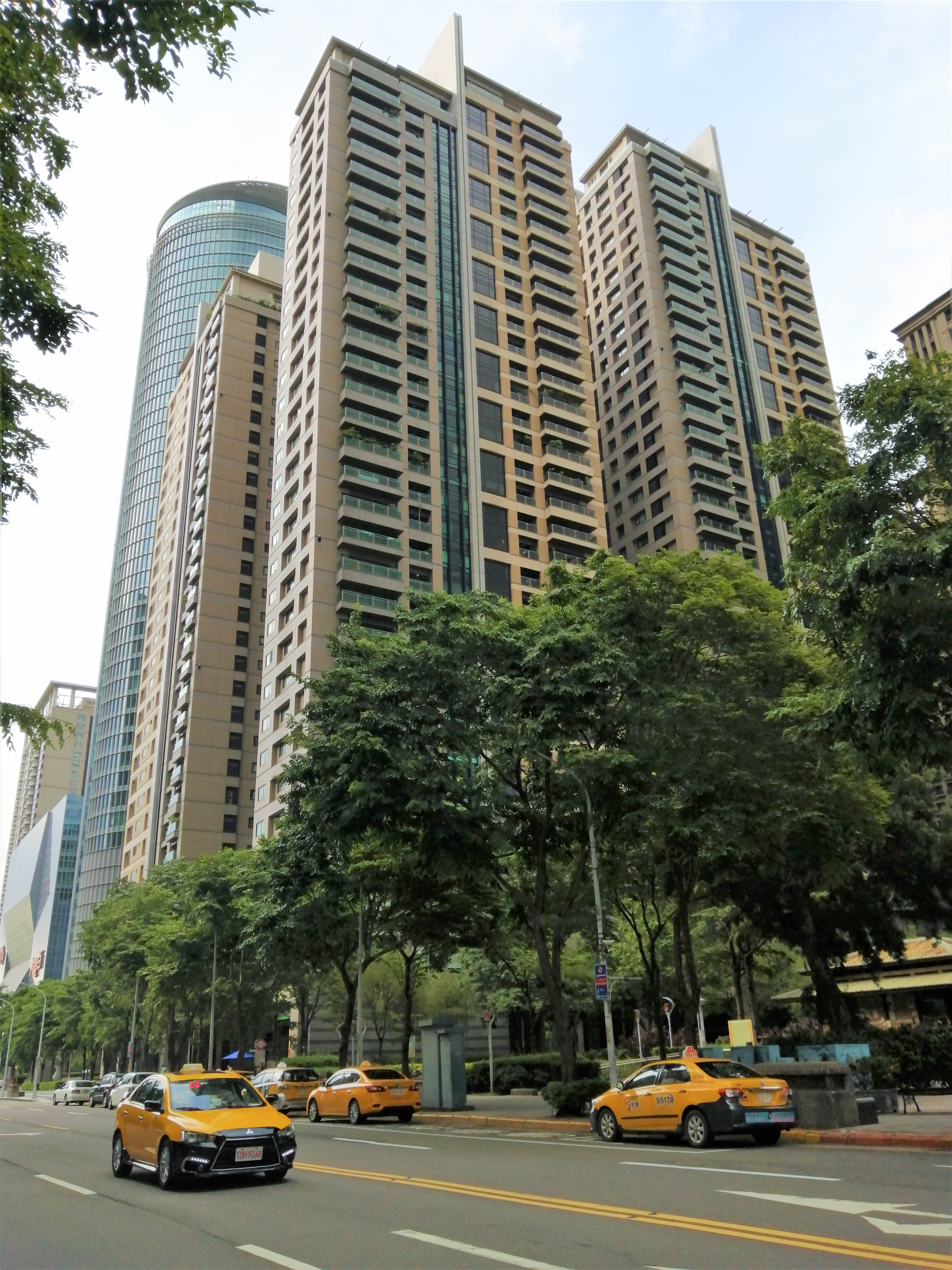
- Interactive map of the Bridge Upto Zenith area

General information
- Status: Completed
- Type: Residential
- Location: No. 166, Section 1, Zhongshan Road, Banqiao District, New Taipei, Taiwan
- Coordinates: 25.012612940549907°N 121.46760345442829°E
- Completed: 2012

Height
- Tip: Tower C: 146 m (479 ft); Tower B: 139 m (456 ft); Tower A: 133 m (436 ft); Tower D: 125 m (410 ft)

Technical details
- Floor count: Tower C: 37; Tower B: 35; Tower A: 33; Tower D: 31
- Floor area: 170,872.1 m^{2} (1,839,252 sq ft)

Design and construction
- Architects: KHL Architects & Associates

The Bridge Upto Zenith (Chinese: 世界花園橋峰) is a complex of four residential skyscrapers completed in 2012 and located in Banqiao District, New Taipei City, Taiwan. Tower C is the tallest with an architectural height of 146 m (479 ft), with 37 floors above ground. Tower B is the second tallest with an architectural height of 139 m (456 ft), with 35 floors above ground. Next is Tower A with an architectural height of 133 m (436 ft) with 33 floors above ground. Finally, the shortest is Tower D with an architectural height of 125 m (410 ft) with 31 floors above ground. The complex was designed by KHL Architects & Associates and constructed by Continental Engineering Corporation, with each tower having 6 basement levels and a total floor area of 170,872.1 m^{2} (1,839,252 sq ft).

There are many leisure facilities in the complex, such as swimming pool, spa pool, steam room, KTV and so on. As of February 2021, Tower C is the sixteenth tallest in New Taipei City (after Tuntex Highrise Building.

== See also ==
- List of tallest buildings in Taiwan
- List of tallest buildings in New Taipei City
- Banqiao District
