= Cathay Zhonghua Tower =

Building in Wanhua, Taipei, Taiwan

Cathay Zhonghua Tower 國泰中華大樓
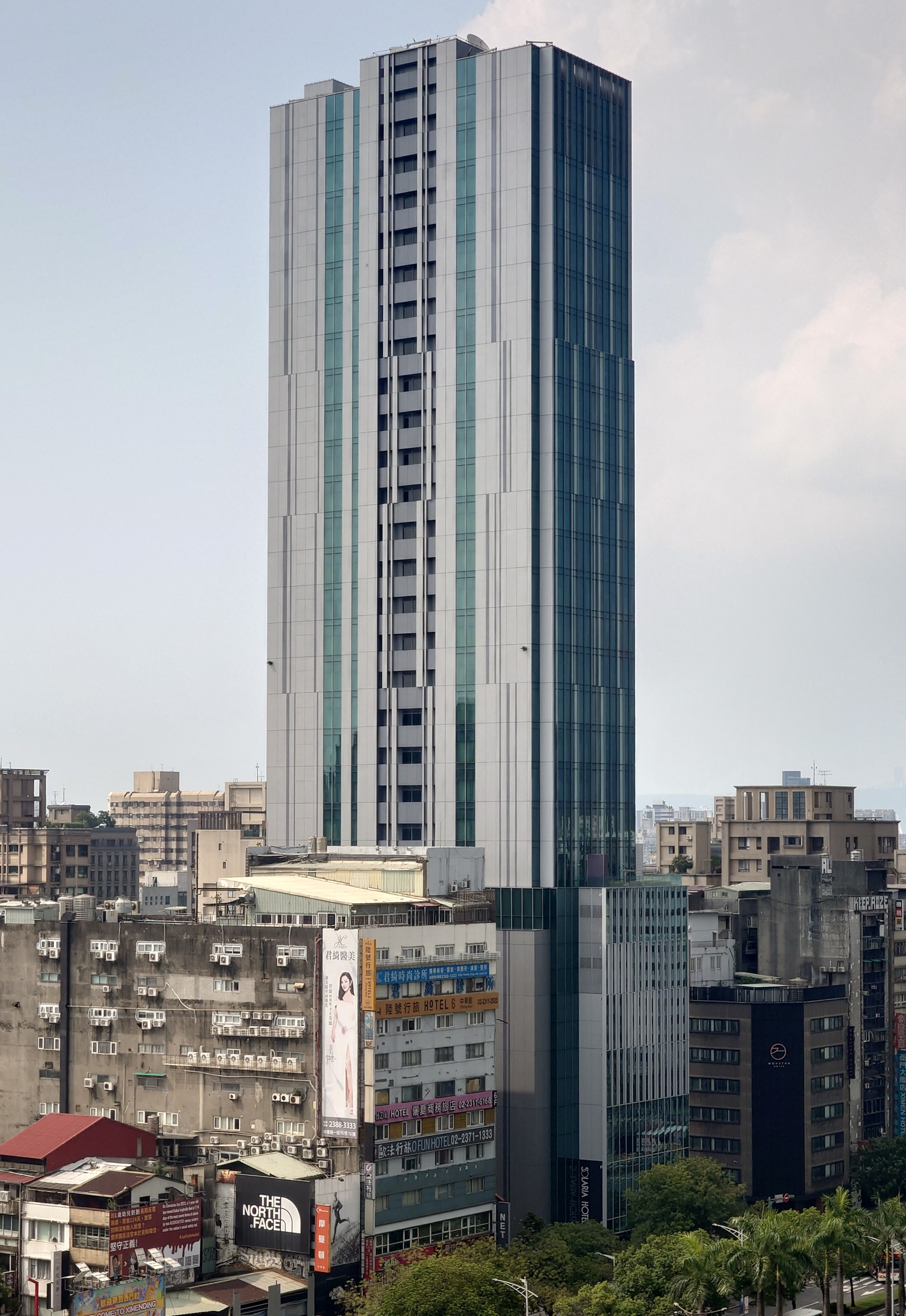
- Interactive map of the Cathay Zhonghua Tower 國泰中華大樓 area

General information
- Status: Completed
- Type: Office, Hotel
- Location: No.88, Section 1, Zhonghua Road, Wanhua District, Taipei, Taiwan
- Coordinates: 25°2′42″N 121°30′31″E
- Construction started: 2019
- Completed: October 2022

Height
- Architectural: 129.5 m (425 ft)

Technical details
- Floor count: 28 above ground 5 below ground
- Floor area: 28,232 m^{2} (303,890 sq ft)

Cathay Zhonghua Tower (Chinese: 國泰中華大樓) is a skyscraper located in Wanhua District, Taipei, Taiwan. The height of the building is 129.5 m (425 ft), with a total floor area of 28,232 m^{2} (303,890 sq ft), comprising 28 floors above ground. The building is a part of the old Zhonghua Building urban renewal project. The old building was demolished in 2019 to make way for the new building, which was completed in October 2022.

The podium of the building will house a shopping center and the middle and upper floors of the building will house a hotel with 300 guest rooms. The hotel is called Solaria Nishitetsu Hotel Taipei and it will be operated by the Japanese hotel chain Nishitetsu Solaria Hotel (jp:西鉄ホテルズ). It is planned to open in the summer of 2023. The building is located in close proximity to Ximending and Taipei Main Station.

== See also ==
- List of tallest buildings in Taiwan
- List of tallest buildings in Taipei
- West Gateway Marriott Hotel
- Four Seasons Hotels and Resorts Taipei
