= Taichung Commercial Bank Headquarters =

Skyscraper in Xitun, Taichung, Taiwan

Taichung Commercial Bank Headquarters 台中商銀新總行大樓
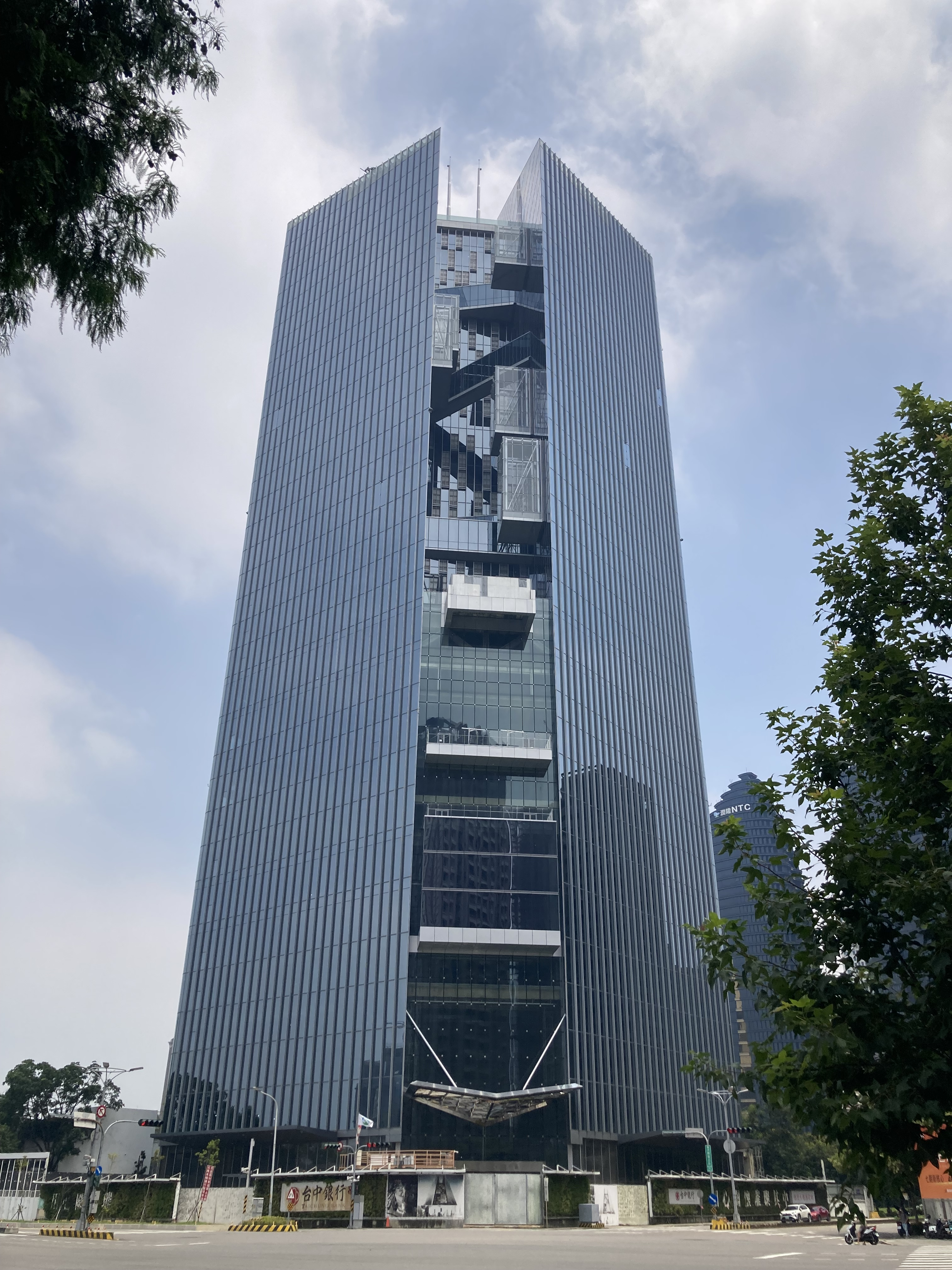
- Taichung Diamond in 2025
- Interactive map of the Taichung Commercial Bank Headquarters 台中商銀新總行大樓 area

General information
- Status: Completed
- Type: Office building, hotel
- Location: Xitun District, Taichung, Taiwan
- Coordinates: 24°9′52″N 120°38′17″E
- Construction started: 2019
- Completed: 2025

Height
- Height: 225.0 m (738.2 ft)

Technical details
- Floor count: 38
- Floor area: 115,310 m^{2} (1,241,200 sq ft)

Design and construction
- Architects: Aedas, YSL Architects & Associates

The Taichung Commercial Bank Headquarters, also known as Taichung Diamond (Chinese: 台中商銀新總行大樓 or Chinese: 台中之鑽) is an under construction skyscraper located in Taichung's 7th Redevelopment Zone, Xitun District, Taichung, Taiwan. It will be the tallest building in Taichung and the first building to surpass 200 m (660 ft) in Taichung. Designed by Aedas, the architectural height of building is 225 m (738 ft), the floor area is 115,310 m^{2} (1,241,200 sq ft), and it comprises 38 floors above ground, as well as 10 basement levels. It will be completed in 2025 and will become the headquarter of Taichung Bank as well as housing a luxury hotel.

== Design ==
The architectural design concept is derived from the Taichung Commercial Bank corporate logo with the Chinese character "Chinese: 中". Taking the image of the bank, money, gems, and the cornucopia as the main axis, the crystal-like appearance is clear, and the cornucopia is inlaid with the image of shining pearls, which symbolizes the "Diamond of Taichung" and hence its alternative name.

This building avoids the practice of concentrating all large functional areas in a single tower. Therefore, two separate towers are created, with features including a series of "floating" transparent glass boxes are placed in the space between the two towers used for exhibition space, sky gardens, conference facilities, banquet halls, and suspended swimming pools.

== Awards ==
The building has won several international architectural awards:

- 2019 Asia Pacific Property Awards: 5-Star, Best Mixed-use Architecture in Taiwan
- 2018 World Architecture Festival (WAF) Award: “Commercial Mixed-use – Future Projects” category
- 2018 International Design Awards (IDA): Gold, Architecture Category – New Commercial Building
- 2018 Architecture MasterPrize: Honorable Mention, Architectural Design Mixed Use Architecture
- 2018 MIPIM Awards: Finalist, Best Futura Project
- 2017 A' Design Awards: Gold for Architecture, Building and Structural Design

== Gallery ==
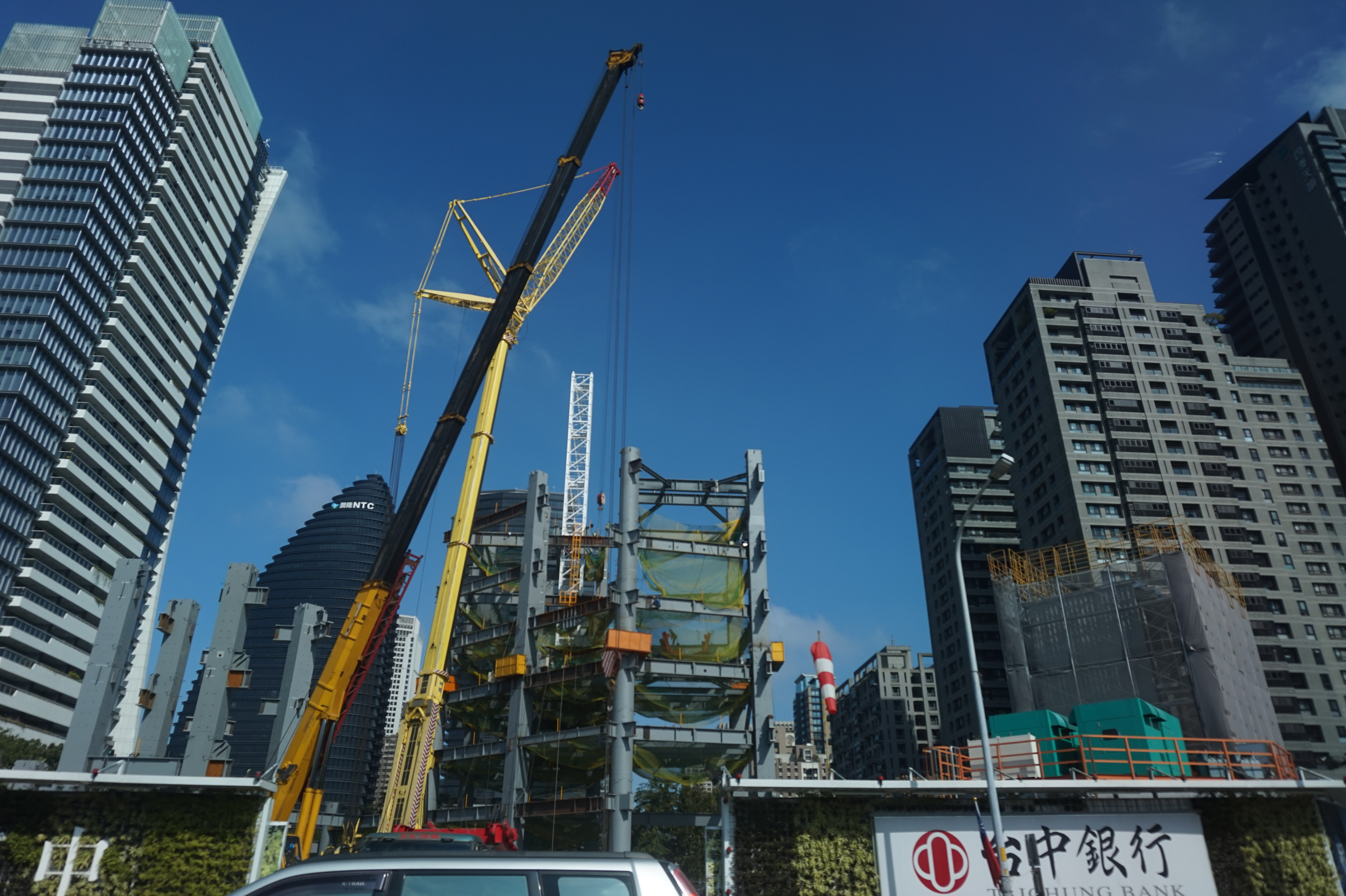
January 2021

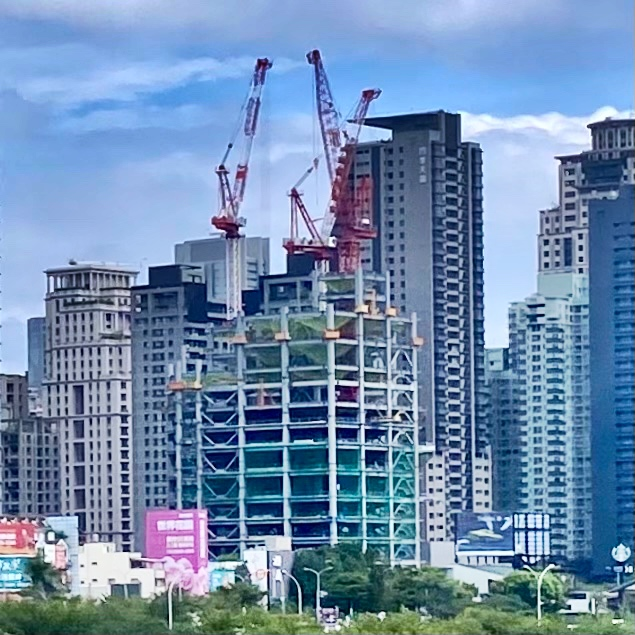
October 2021

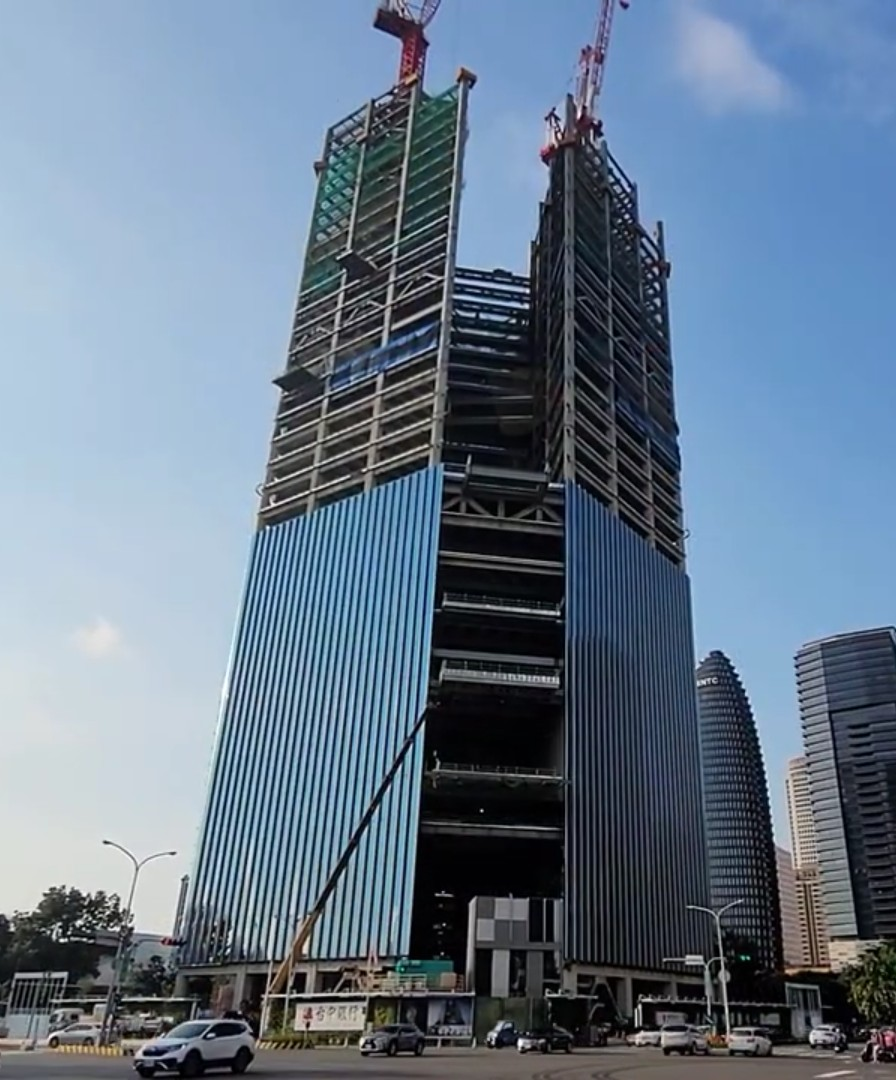
July 2022

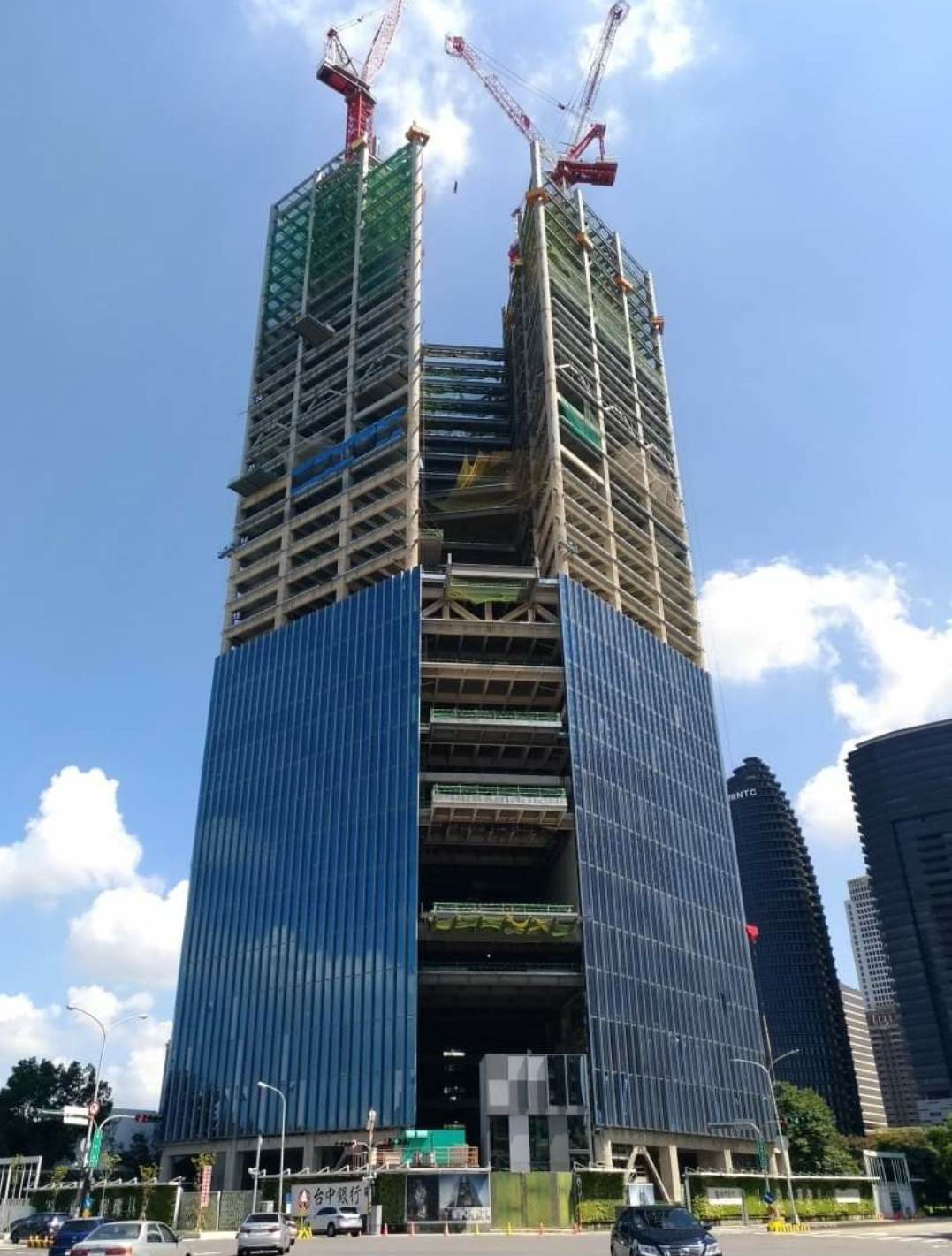
August 2022

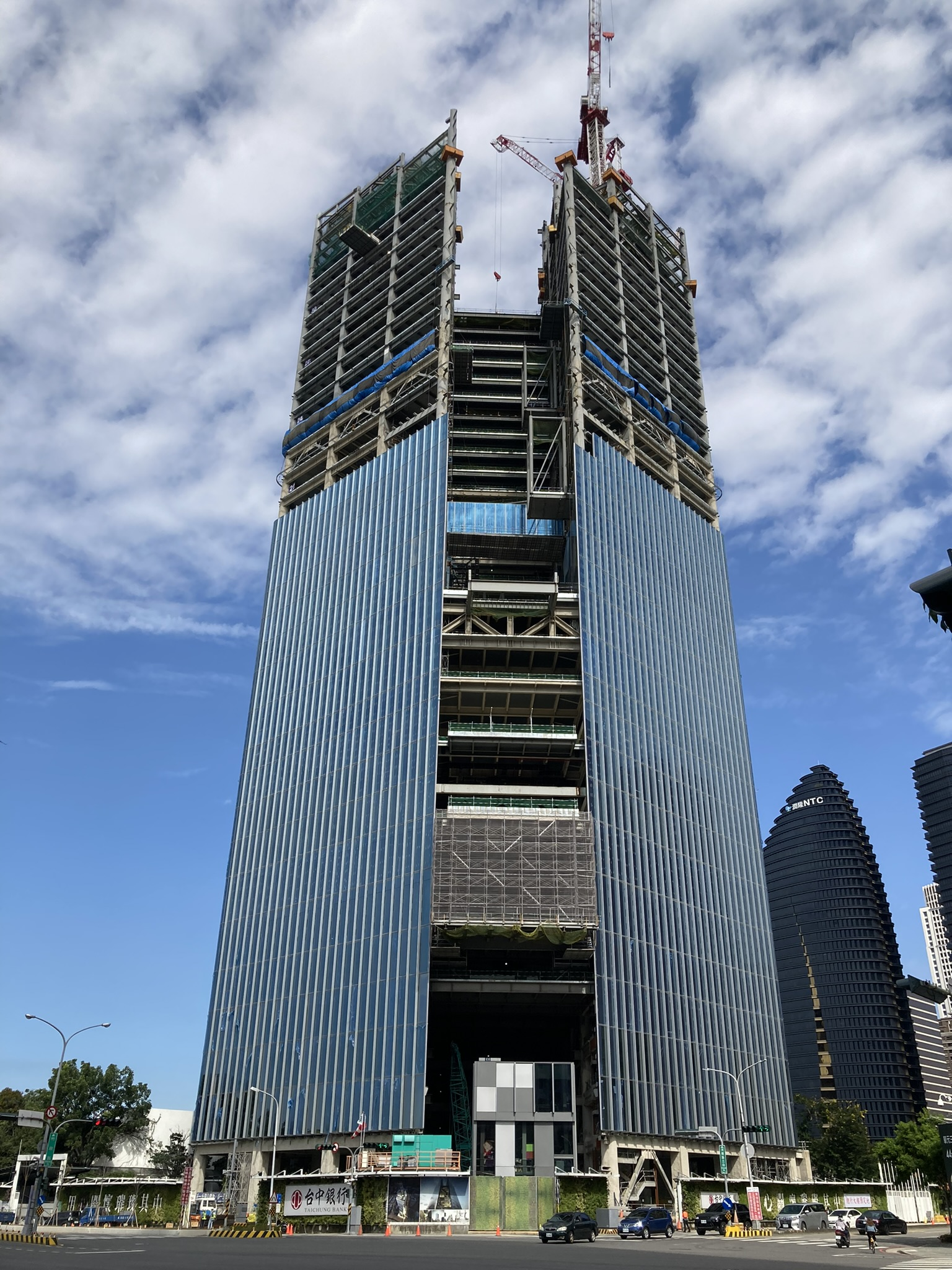
November 2022

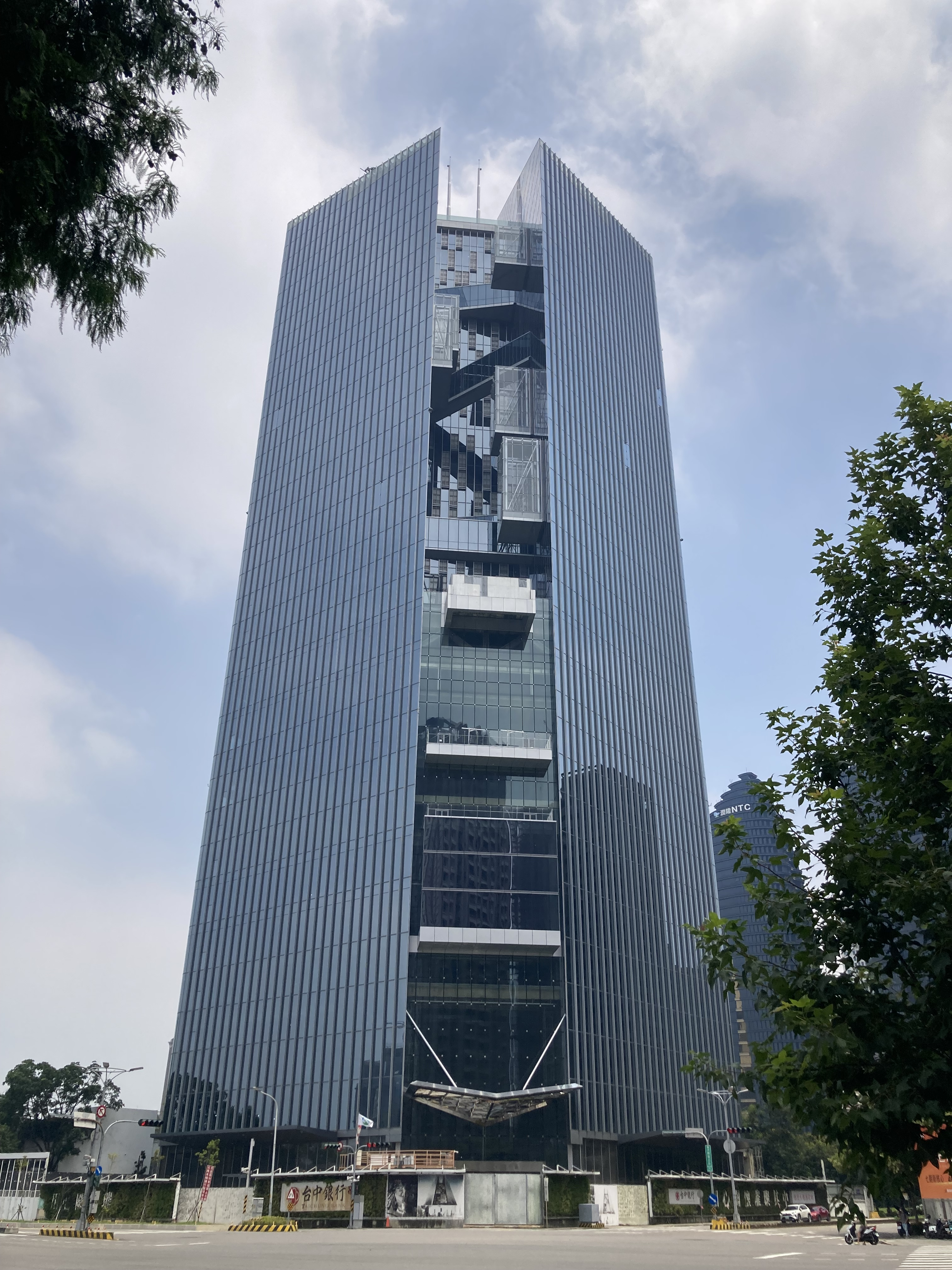
July 2025

== See also ==
- List of tallest buildings in Taiwan
- List of tallest buildings in Taichung
