= International Star Diamond Tower =

Skyscraper office building in North District, Taichung, Taiwan

International Star Diamond Tower 國際星鑽大樓
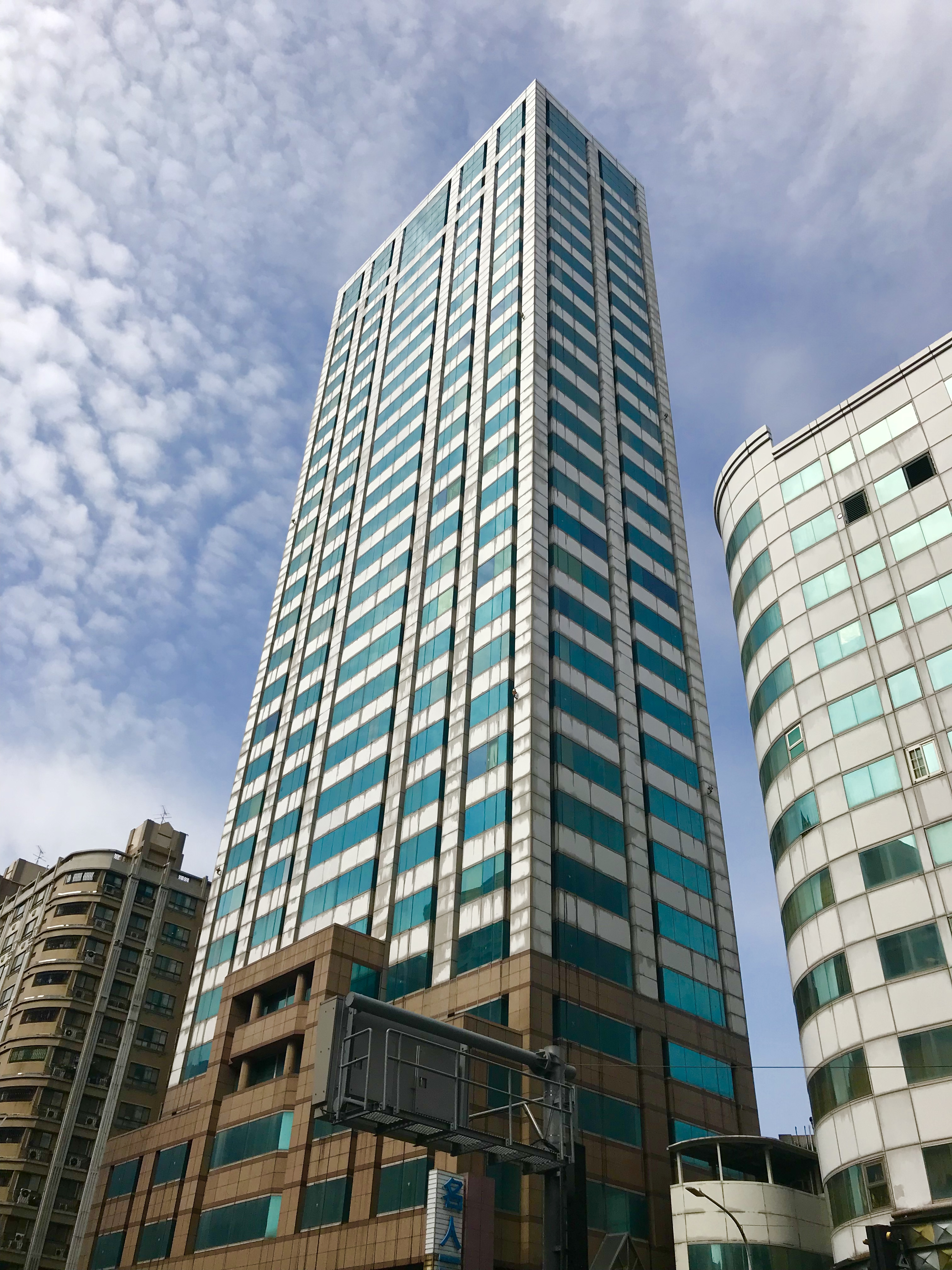
- Interactive map of the International Star Diamond Tower 國際星鑽大樓 area

General information
- Status: Completed
- Type: Office building
- Classification: Office
- Location: No. 97, Section 4, Chongxin Road, Sanchong District, New Taipei, Taiwan
- Coordinates: 25.055096567571145°N 121.4856381263595°E
- Completed: 1993

Height
- Roof: 123 m (404 ft)

Technical details
- Floor count: 30

The International Star Diamond Tower (Chinese: 國際星鑽大樓; pinyin: Guójì xīng zuān dàlóu) is a skyscraper office building located in Sanchong District, New Taipei, Taiwan. The height of the building is 123 m (404 ft) and it comprises 30 floors above ground. The building was completed in 1993 and had undergone refurbishment in 2003. When it was first completed in 1993, it was the tallest building in New Taipei (then Taipei County).

When it was first completed, the building housed a Mazu temple on its topmost floor called Hong Sheng Temple and was the highest Mazu temple in Taiwan. After several protests by residents, of the building, Hong Sheng Temple was moved to lower floors.

== See also ==
- List of tallest buildings in Taiwan
- List of tallest buildings in New Taipei City
