= Huang Hsiang Taipei Square =

Skyscraper office building in Taipei, Taiwan

Huang Hsiang Taipei Square 皇翔臺北廣場
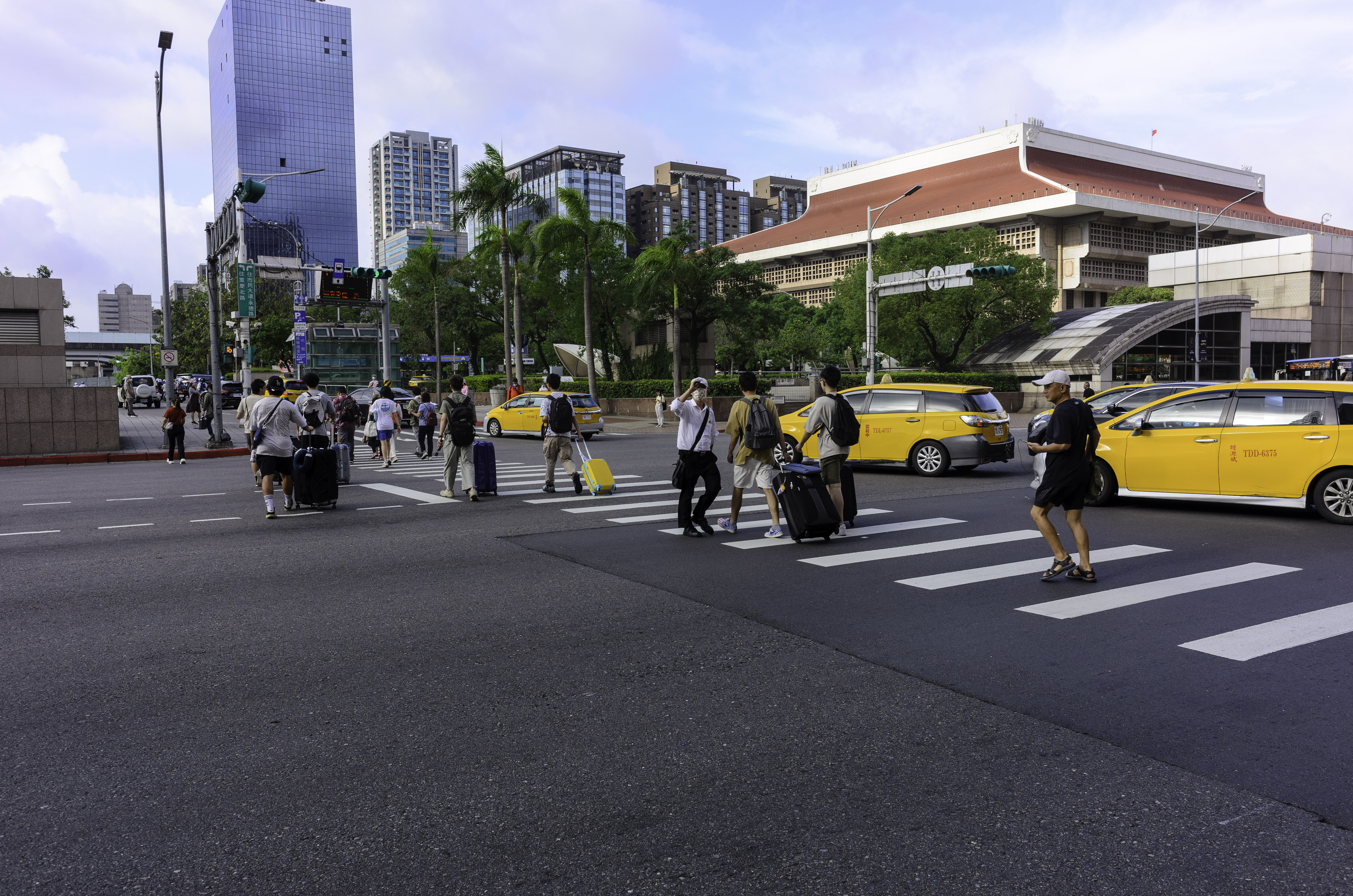
- Interactive map of the Huang Hsiang Taipei Square 皇翔臺北廣場 area

General information
- Status: Completed
- Type: Office, Hotel
- Location: No. 2, Section 1, Chengde Road, Datong District, Taipei, Taiwan
- Coordinates: 25°2′58″N 121°30′59″E
- Completed: 2022

Height
- Architectural: 119.25 m (391.2 ft)

Technical details
- Floor count: 23
- Floor area: 57,099.17 m^{2} (614,610.4 sq ft)

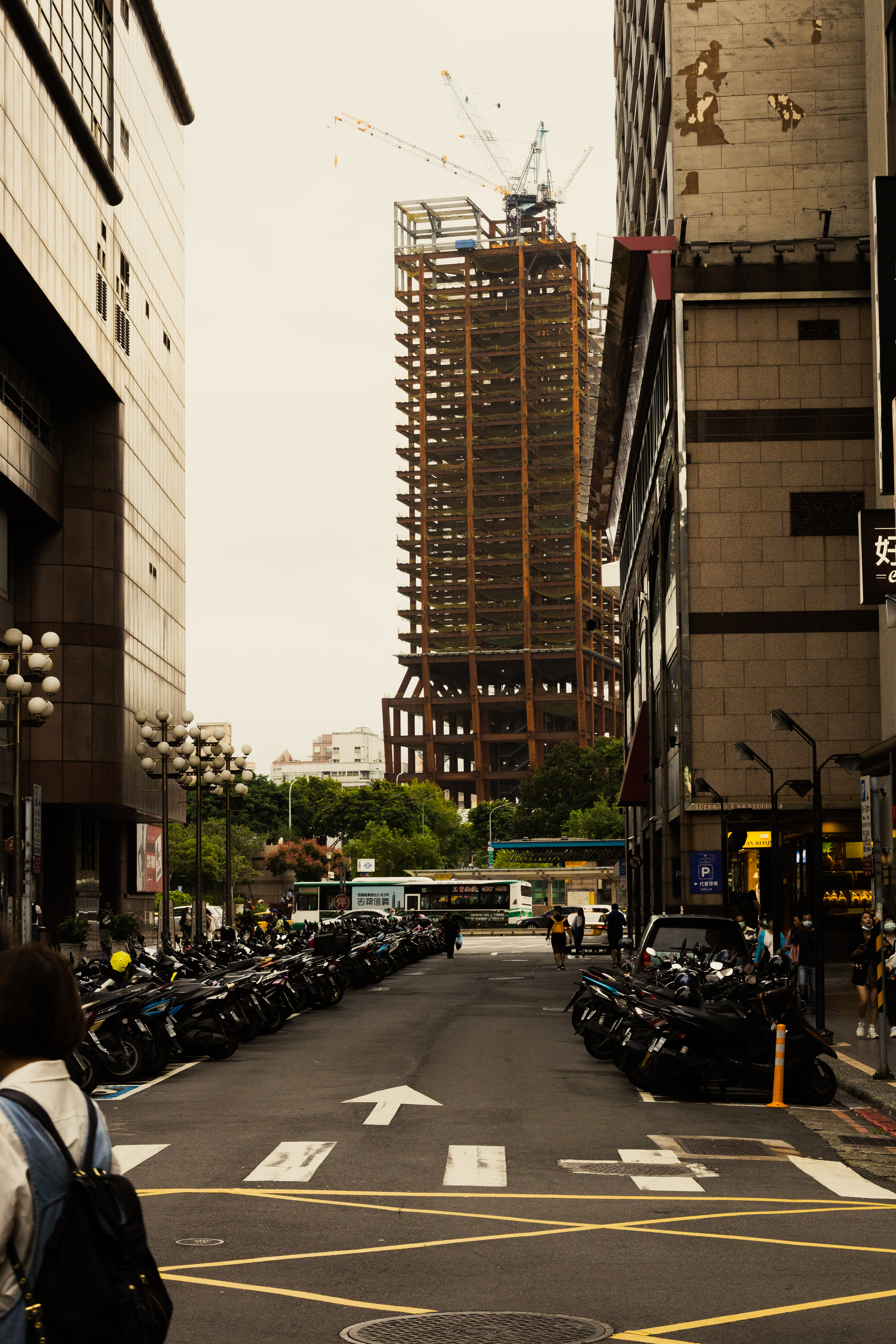
Huang Hsiang Taipei Square under construction in 2020.

Huang Hsiang Taipei Square (Chinese: 皇翔臺北廣場) is a skyscraper office building located on Section 1, Chengde Road, Datong District, Taipei, Taiwan. Topped out in 2021, the height of the building is 119.25 m (391.2 ft), and it comprises 23 floors above ground and 5 floors below ground, with a total floor area of 57,099.17 m^{2} (614,610.4 sq ft). As of September 2024, it is the tallest building in Datong District. The building was originated designated as a Marriott Hotel, however due to the COVID-19 pandemic, the tourism industry has been greatly affected. Therefore, in 2020, the use of the skyscraper was changed to an office building instead.

== See also ==
- List of tallest buildings in Taiwan
- List of tallest buildings in Taipei
