= Nanshan Xinyi A26 =

Skyscraper office building in Xinyi, Taipei, Taiwan

Nanshan Xinyi A26 南山信義 A26
- Construction progress
- Interactive map of the Nanshan Xinyi A26 南山信義 A26 area

General information
- Status: Under construction
- Type: Office
- Location: Xinyi District, Taipei, Taiwan
- Coordinates: 25°02′01″N 121°34′01″E
- Construction started: 2022
- Completed: 2027

Height
- Architectural: 153.3 m (503 ft)
- Roof: 150.4 m (493 ft)

Technical details
- Floor count: 30 above ground 3 below ground
- Floor area: 83,076.65 m^{2} (894,229.6 sq ft)

Nanshan Xinyi A26 (Chinese: 南山信義 A26), is an under construction, 153.3 m (503 ft), 30-storey skyscraper office building located in Xinyi Planning District, Xinyi District, Taipei, Taiwan. The building topped out on 5 March 2026 and is expected to be completed in early 2027.

The building was the former site of the Xinyi District Administration Center, which was completed in 1990 and classified to be a "high-chloride concrete building" (informally known as "sea-sand building"). The old building was demolished in August 2023 to make way for the new building.

== Gallery ==
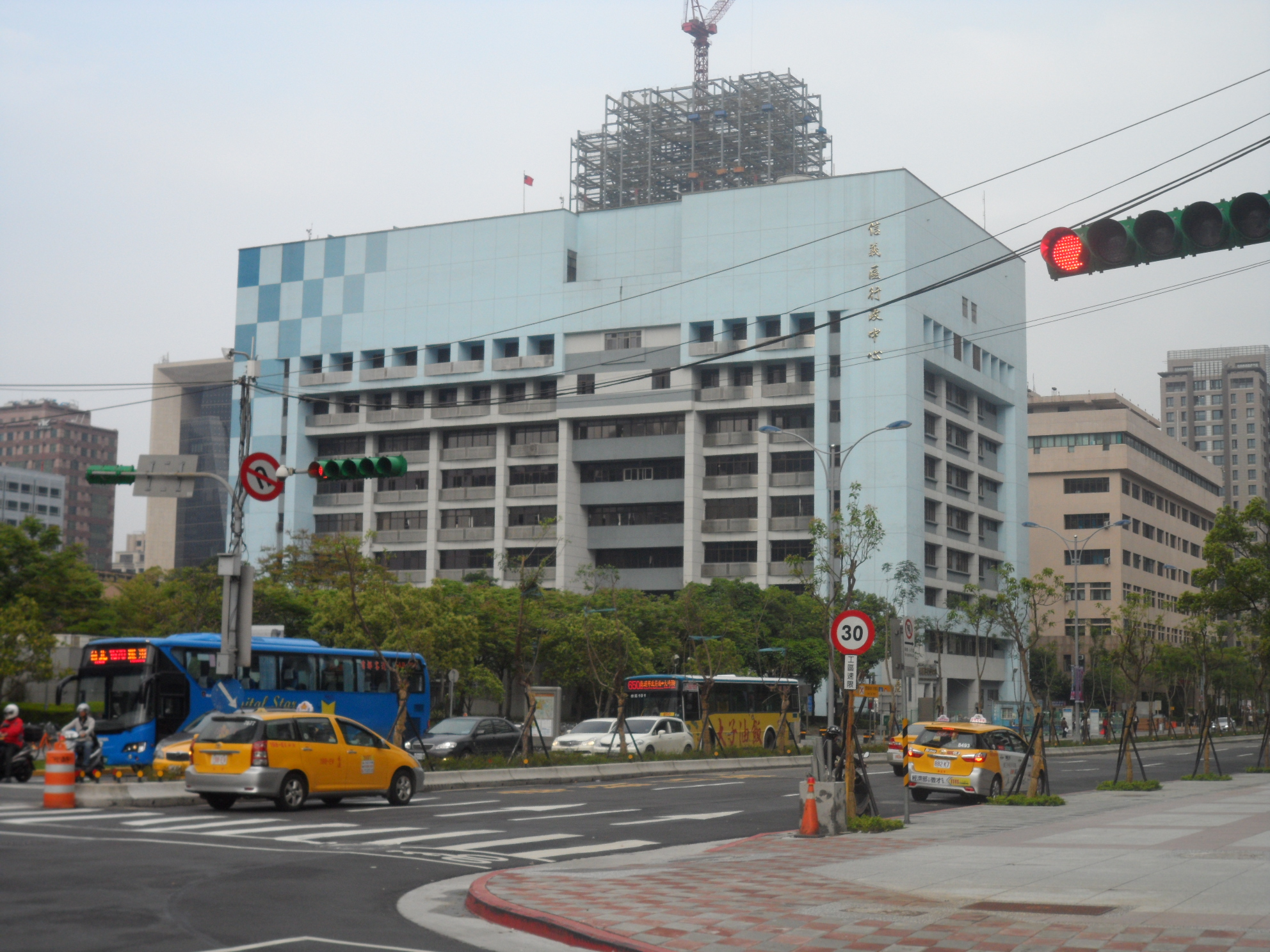
Xinyi District Administration Center in 2013

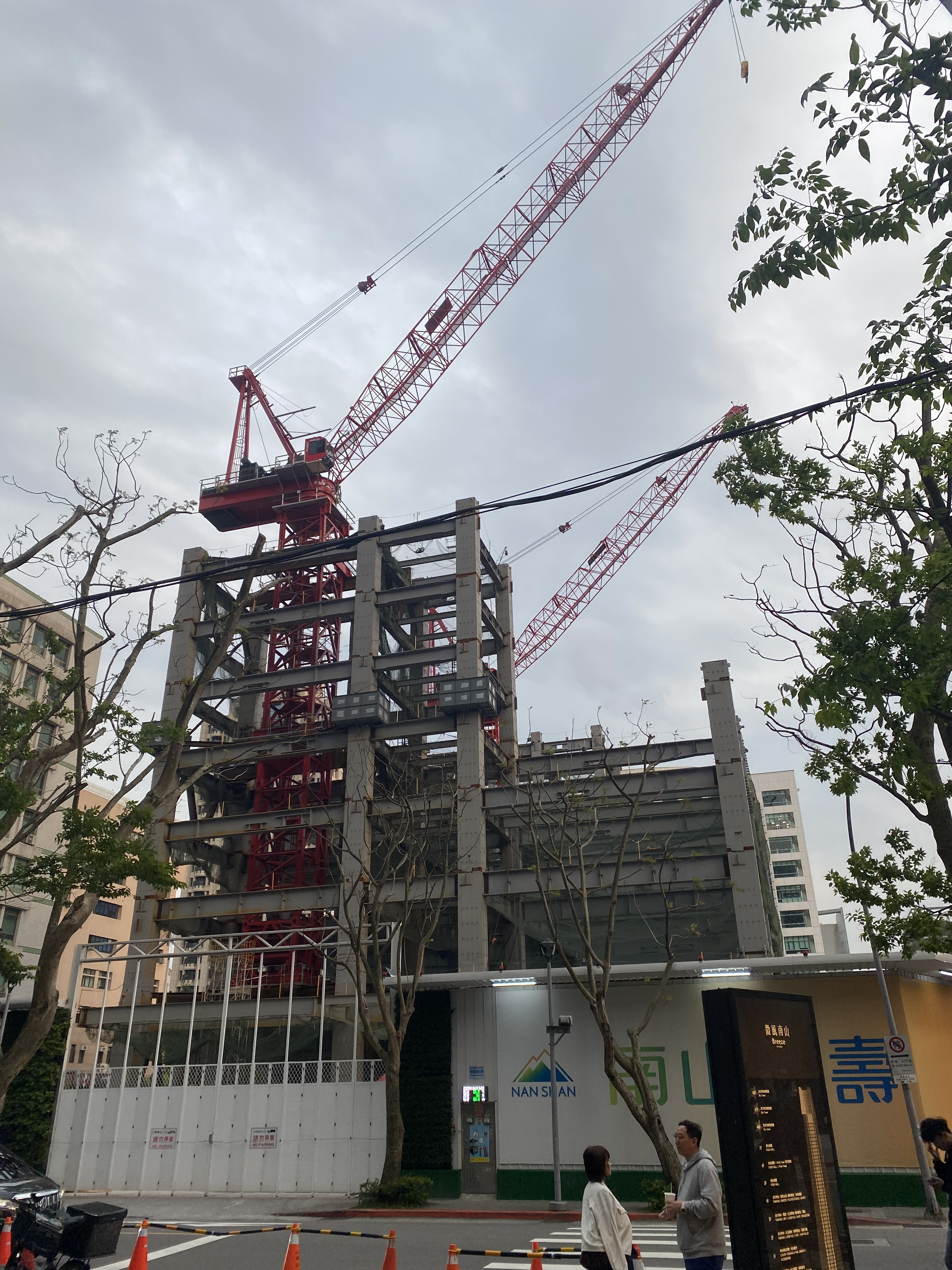
April 2025 construction progress

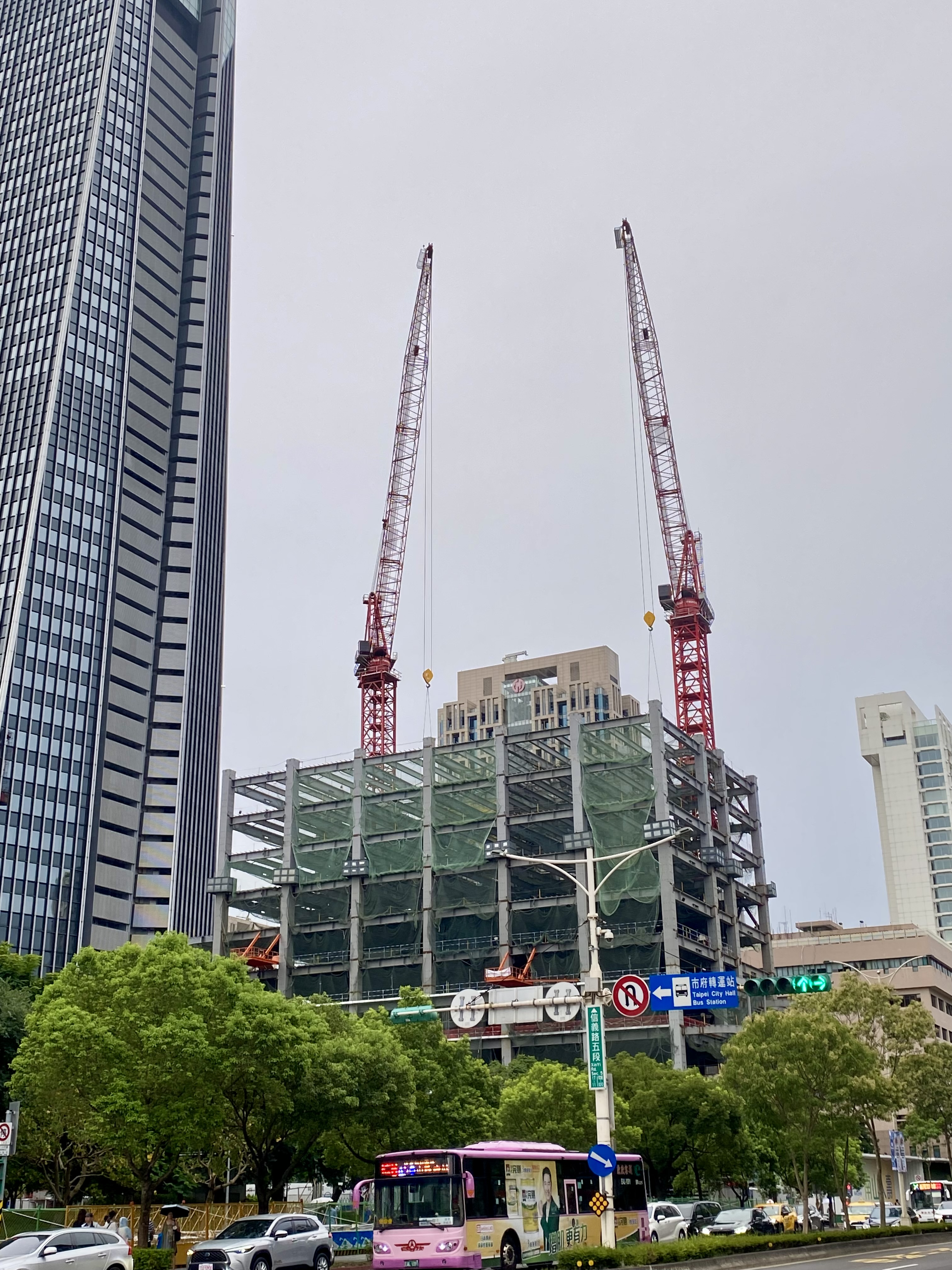
July 2025 construction progress

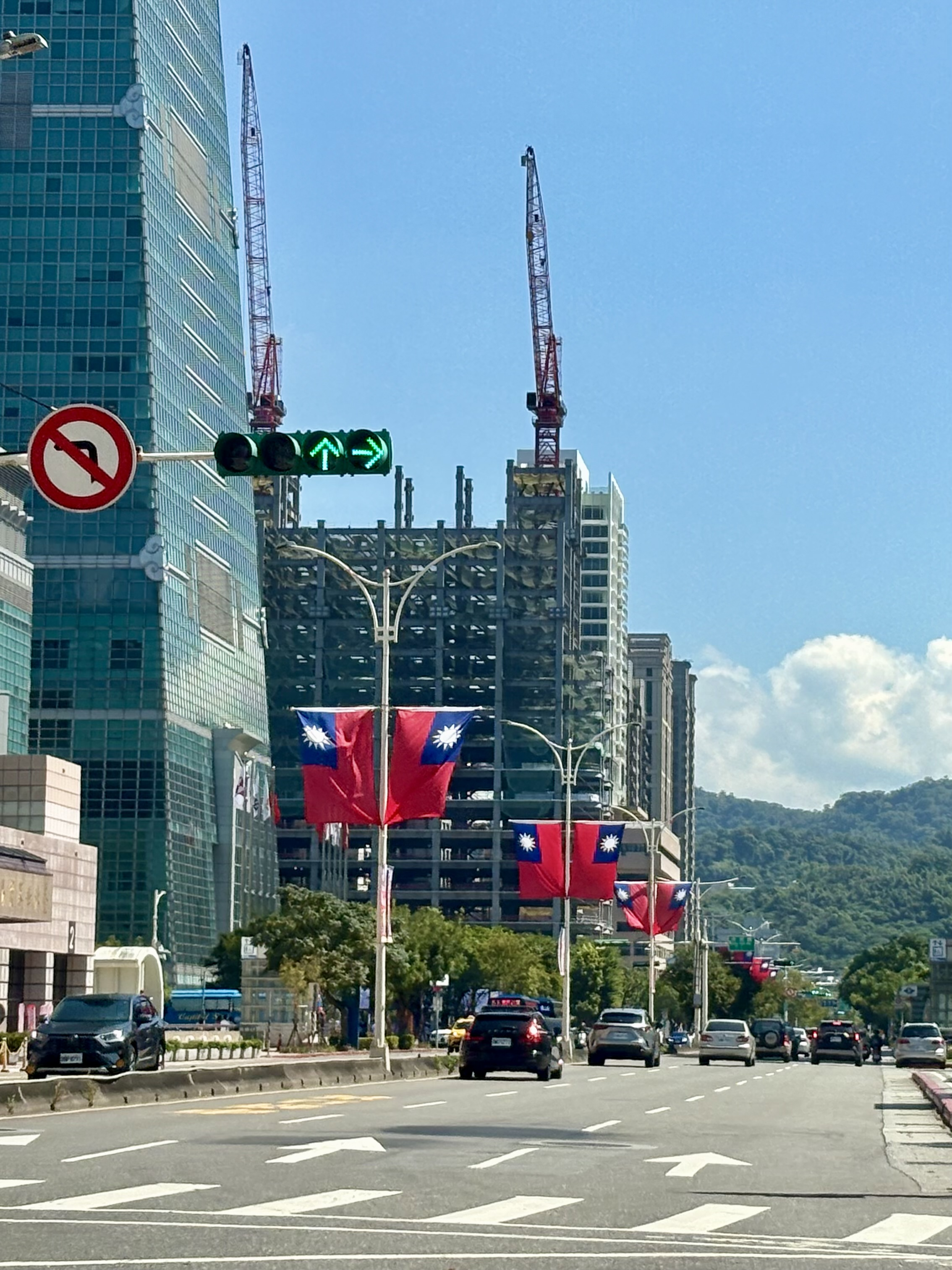
October 2025 construction progress

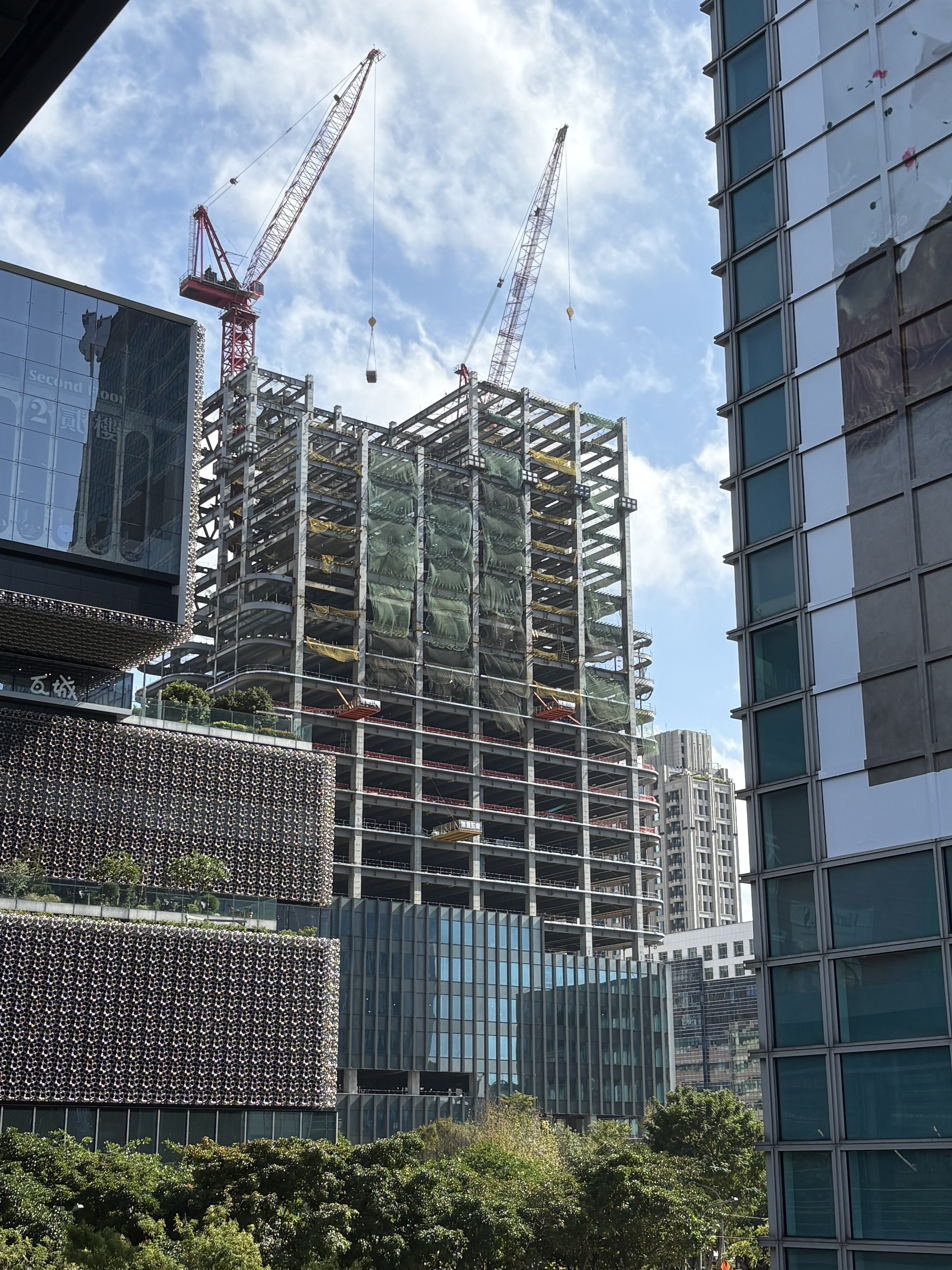
December 2025 construction progress

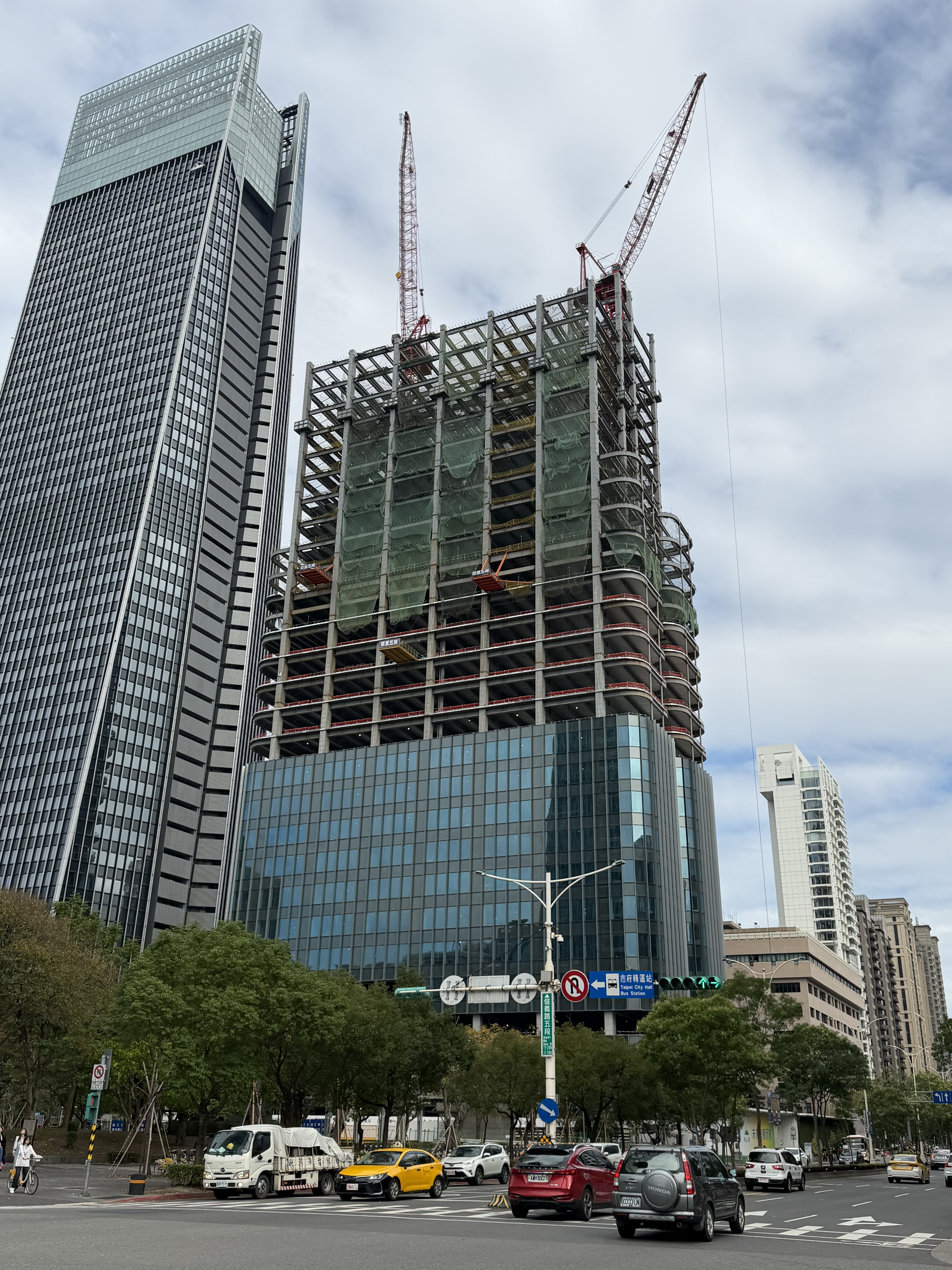
January 2026 construction progress

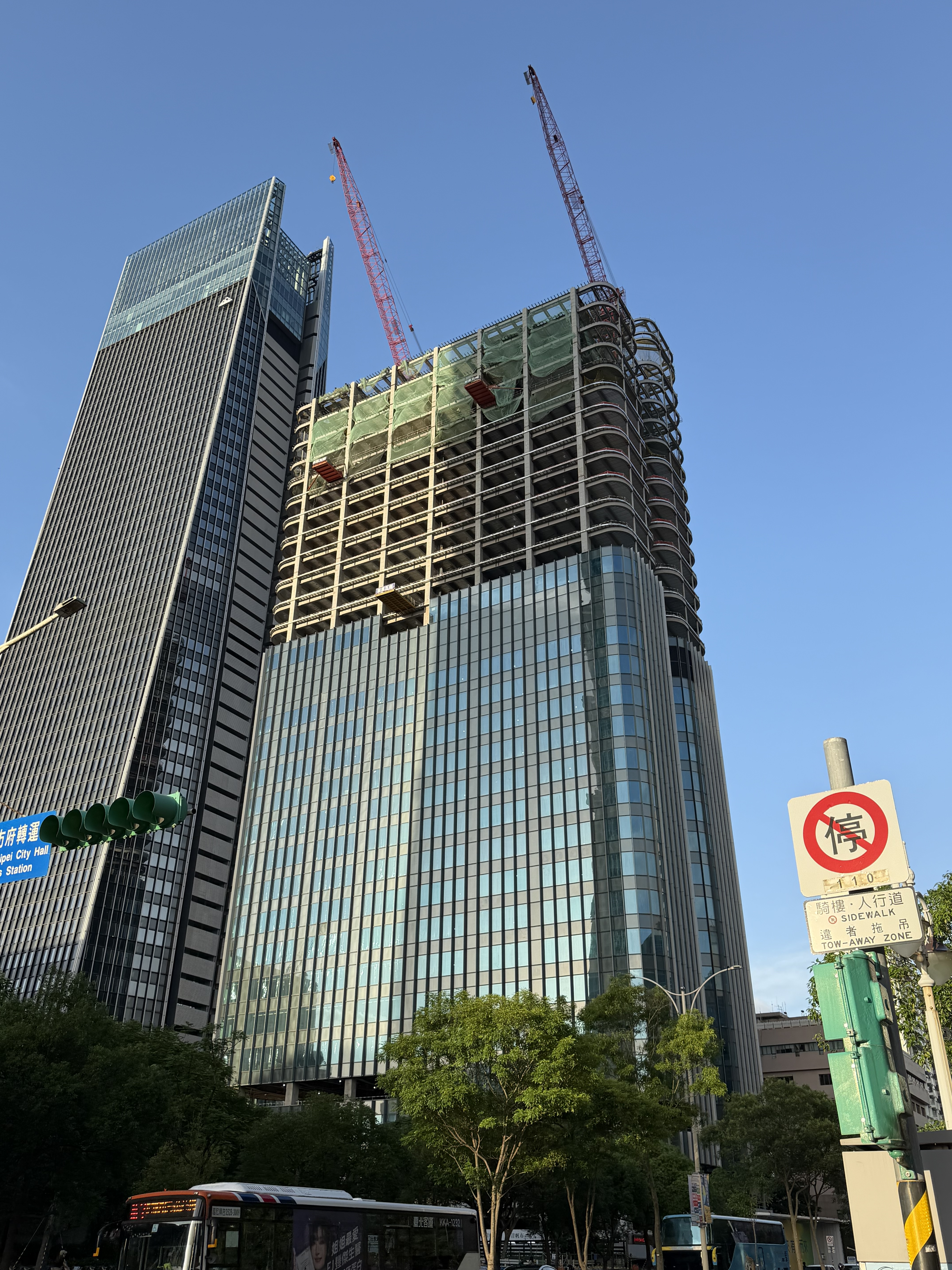
May 2026 construction progress

July 2026 construction progress

September 2026 construction progress

== See also ==
- List of tallest buildings in Taiwan
- List of tallest buildings in Taipei
