= Voco Chiayi =

Skyscraper hotel in West, Chiayi City, Taiwan

Voco Chiayi 嘉義福容大飯店
- Interactive map of the Voco Chiayi 嘉義福容大飯店 area

General information
- Status: Topped-out
- Type: Hotel
- Location: No. 279, Zhuwei Road, West District, Chiayi City, Taiwan
- Coordinates: 23°29′12″N 120°25′32″E
- Construction started: 2016
- Completed: 14 April 2023

Height
- Architectural: 142.2 m (467 ft)

Technical details
- Floor count: 34 above ground 5 below ground
- Floor area: 64,665.04 m^{2} (696,048.7 sq ft)

Voco Chiayi (Chinese: 嘉義福容voco酒店) is a 34-storey, 142.2 m (467 ft)-tall skyscraper hotel located in Chiayi City, Taiwan. The hotel topped out on 14 April 2023 and became the tallest building in the city. The hotel is located near Chiayi railway station and Chiayi Art Museum. The hotel started trial operations on 1 April 2024 and opened on 27 June of the same year. Former president of Taiwan Tsai Ing-wen attended its opening ceremony.

== Facilities ==
The hotel is operated by Fullon Hotels & Resorts (zh:福容大飯店) and offers 400 guest rooms and suites with city and mountain views, spanning a total of 34 floors above ground and 5 below ground.

== See also ==
- List of tallest buildings in Taiwan
- List of tallest buildings in Taipei
