= Foxconn Kaohsiung Flagship Headquarters =

Coordinates: 22°36′42″N 120°17′36″E

- 高雄亞灣・鴻海旗艦總部
- Interactive map of the Foxconn Kaohsiung Flagship Headquarters area

General information
- Status: Proposed
- Type: Corporate headquarters
- Location: Lingya District, Kaohsiung, Taiwan
- Construction started: 2027
- Completed: 2033
- Owner: Foxconn

Height
- Roof: North Tower: 234 m (768 ft); South Tower: 130 m (430 ft)

Technical details
- Floor count: North Tower: 45; South Tower: 32
- Floor area: 172,000 m^{2} (1,850,000 sq ft) (total development area)

Design and construction
- Developer: Foxconn

Foxconn Kaohsiung Flagship Headquarters (Chinese: 高雄亞灣・鴻海旗艦總部) is a planned corporate headquarters and mixed-use development skyscraper project developed by Foxconn in the Asia New Bay Area of Kaohsiung, Taiwan. The skyscraper is intended to serve as Foxconn's southern Taiwan headquarters in order to further expand the company's presence in the region.

The development project has a total floor area of 172,000 m^{2} (1,850,000 sq ft) and consists of two office towers of 45 and 32 floors respectively, in addition to retail spaces, restaurants and corporate housing. The complex is expected to begin construction in 2027 and be completed in 2033.

The location of the project is directly adjacent to the Kaohsiung Port Cruise Terminal and the Kaohsiung Exhibition Center and can be accessed via the Cruise Terminal light rail station on the Yellow line of Kaohsiung Metro.

According to DigiTimes, the development is expected to create approximately 3,000 jobs, generate an annual economic output of about NT$20 billion and contribute NT$6.3 billion towards metro construction funding.

== See also ==
- List of tallest buildings in Taiwan
- List of tallest buildings in Kaohsiung
