= Asia Plaza =

Proposed skyscraper in Kaohsiung, Taiwan

Coordinates: 22°36′47.7″N 120°18′12.8″E

Asia Plaza 亞洲企業中心
- Interactive map of the Asia Plaza 亞洲企業中心 area

General information
- Status: On-hold
- Type: office
- Architectural style: Contemporary Modern
- Location: Kaohsiung, Taiwan, Kaohsiung, Taiwan
- Construction started: 2021
- Completed: 2030
- Owner: Far Eastern Group

Height
- Roof: 431 m (1,414 ft)

Technical details
- Floor count: 103

Design and construction
- Architecture firm: TMA Architects & Associates

The Asia Plaza (Chinese: 亞洲企業中心; pinyin: Yàzhōu qì yè zhōngxīn) is a vision supertall skyscraper that will rise 431 m (1,414 ft) in Kaohsiung, Taiwan. The building will comprise 103 floors above ground as well as 7 basement levels. It is a part of the Asia Plaza Tri-Tower Complex, that comprise three buildings: the 103-storey Asia Plaza, the 49-storey Far Eastern Ding Ding Hotel and the 18-storey Mega'21 Far Eastern Shopping Complex, of which only the shopping complex was completed in 2001.

The building was proposed in 1997 and was originally scheduled to start construction in 2004 upon the completion of the Mega'21 Far Eastern Shopping Complex. It was planned to be completed in 2008. However, the development schedule has been delayed several times, and construction is currently scheduled to start in 2021 and be completed in 2030. After the building is complete, Asia Plaza will surpass 85 Sky Tower to become the tallest skyscraper in Kaohsiung City and the second tallest building in Taiwan.

== See also ==
- List of tallest buildings in Kaohsiung
- List of buildings with 100 floors or more
- List of tallest buildings in the world
- List of tallest buildings in Taiwan
- List of future tallest buildings
- List of supertall skyscrapers
