= An-Tai Tower =

Skyscraper office building in Tamsui District, New Taipei, Taiwan

An-Tai Tower 安泰登峰
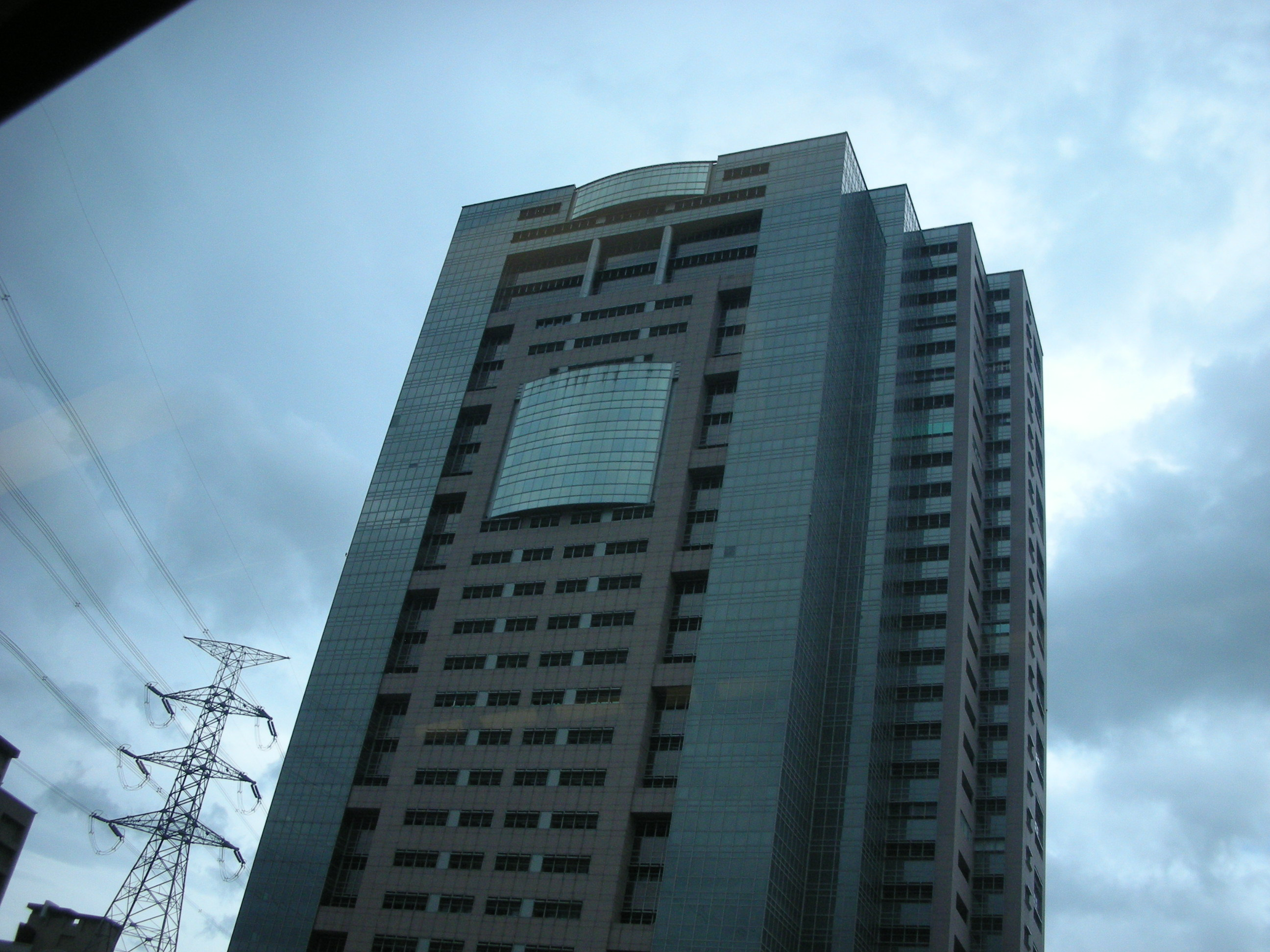
- The Taiwan Research Institute is located on the 29th floor.
- Interactive map of the An-Tai Tower 安泰登峰 area

General information
- Status: Completed
- Type: Office building
- Classification: Office
- Location: No. 27, Section 2, Zhongzheng East Road, Tamsui District, New Taipei, Taiwan
- Coordinates: 25°9′25″N 121°27′35″E
- Completed: 2002

Height
- Roof: 130 m (430 ft)

Technical details
- Floor count: 31

The An-Tai Tower, also known as Taiwan Research Institute Building (Chinese: 安泰登峰; pinyin: Shìjì jīnróng guǎngchǎng dàlóu), is a skyscraper office building located in Tamsui District, New Taipei, Taiwan. The height of the building is 130 m (430 ft) and it comprises 31 floors above ground. The building was completed in 2002. It houses the Taiwan Research Institute (zh:臺灣綜合研究院), hence the alternative name.

== Incidents ==
On July 8, 2008, a man with surname Ma, who had a master's degree in electrical engineering from Northwestern University, was dissatisfied with his girlfriend who had been with him for three years but wanted to break up. He brutally cut his girlfriend's eyes and nose, destroyed her face, before eventually cutting her throat. He then broke into the famous An-Tai Tower and committed suicide by jumping from the top of the 31st floor, which is 130 meters high. The policemen who arrived there tried to stop him, but the man was determined to die and broke free. After he fell, Ma's head burst open on the spot and his brain overflowed, causing his death. This was a shock to Taiwanese society and caused great alarm as the office of the former Taiwanese president Lee Teng-hui was located in this very building at the time.

== See also ==
- List of tallest buildings in Taiwan
- List of tallest buildings in New Taipei City
