= Taipei No.1 =

Residential skyscraper complex in Sanchong, New Taipei, Taiwan

Taipei No.1 麗寶之星T1
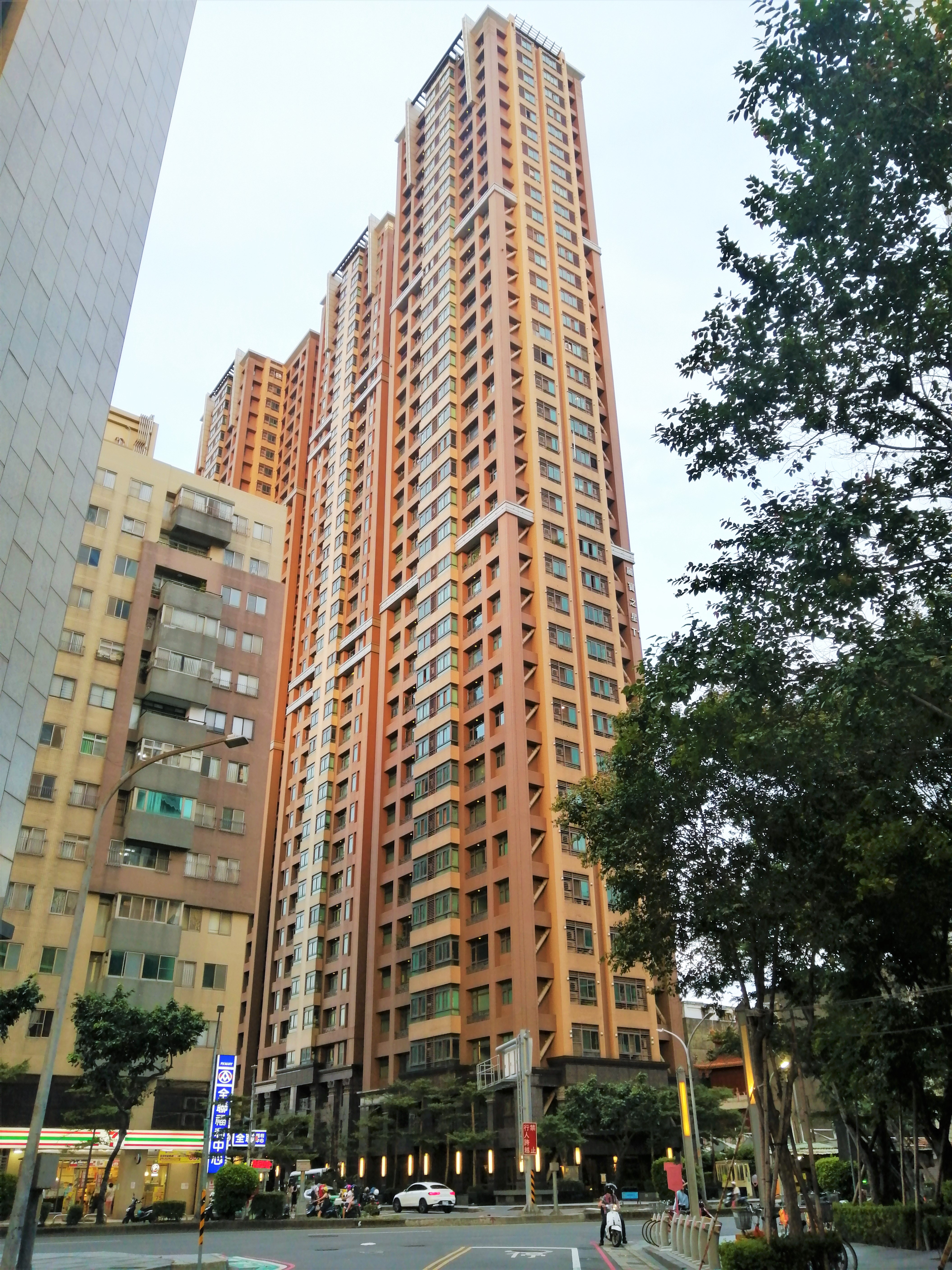
- Interactive map of the Taipei No.1 麗寶之星T1 area

General information
- Status: Completed
- Type: Residential
- Location: No. 1, Lane 250, Zhongzheng South Road, Sanchong District, New Taipei, Taiwan
- Coordinates: 25.05356079421562°N 121.49385834173779°E
- Completed: 2008

Height
- Architectural: Tower A: 140 m (460 ft); Towers B & C: 137 m (449 ft)

Technical details
- Floor count: Tower A: 37; Towers B & C: 36

The Taipei No.1 (Chinese: 麗寶之星T1) is a residential skyscraper complex completed in 2008 and located in Sanchong District, New Taipei, Taiwan. The complex comprises three towers: tower A is 140 m (460 ft) tall with 37 stories and towers B and C are both 137 m (449 ft) tall with 36 stories, with six basement levels. When completed, the building was the tallest in the district until it was surpassed by Chicony Electronics Headquarters in 2013. Taipei No.1 is located on the bank of Tamsui River, one bridge away from Taipei city. The complex was constructed under strict requirements of preventing damage caused by earthquakes and typhoons common in Taiwan.

== See also ==
- List of tallest buildings in Taiwan
- List of tallest buildings in New Taipei City
