= List of tallest buildings in Taiwan =

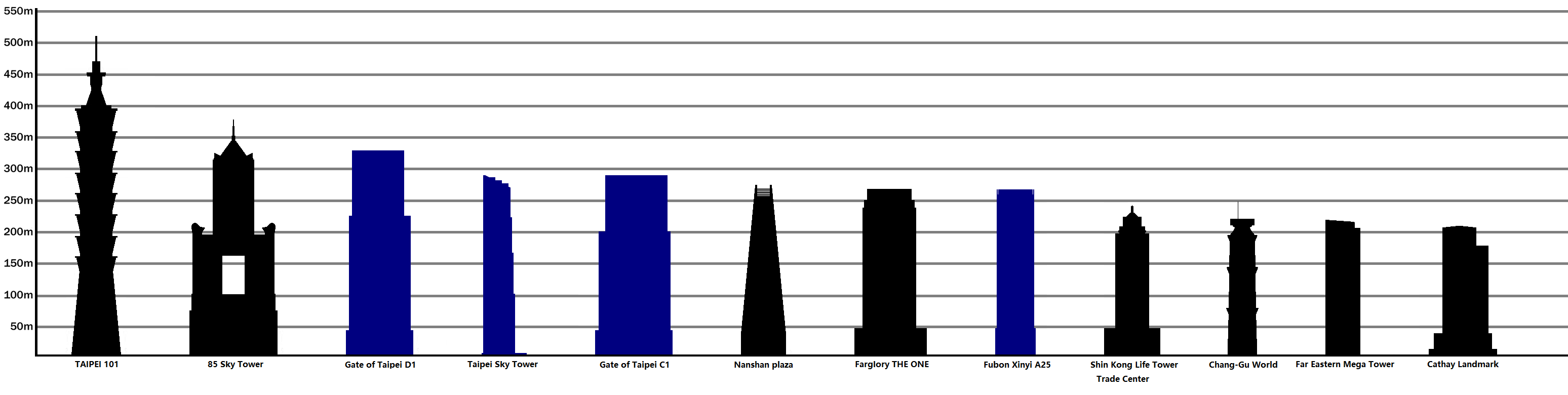
Tallest buildings in Taiwan. The buildings in blue indicate that they are currently under construction.

Locations of the tallest buildings in Taiwan: are the locations of the five tallest skyscrapers; are the locations of other skyscrapers

This list ranks skyscrapers in Taiwan by height. The tallest building in Taiwan is currently the 101–story Taipei 101, which rises 509.2 metres (1,671 ft) and was completed in 2004. It was officially classified as the world's tallest from 2004 to 2010. Currently, it is still the tallest building in Taiwan, Asia's sixth tallest building, and the world's ninth tallest building. There are currently five buildings over 200 metres under construction in Taiwan, including the Taipei Twin Tower 1, which will reach 369 metres (1,211 ft).

Unlike other East-Asian countries with numerous supertalls, Taiwan's skyscrapers are on average relatively shorter. Construction is difficult due to Taiwan's geographical position, located very close to the boundary between the Eurasian Plate and the Philippine Plate, thus being prone to many earthquakes. Therefore, all buildings above 50 metres (160 ft) must be as earthquake-proof as possible and adhere to numerous strict structural standards set by the government to ensure safety.

== Cities with the most high-rise buildings ==
City	≥100 m	≥150 m	≥200 m	≥250 m	≥300 m
New Taipei	194	13	1	0	0
Kaohsiung	140	12	3	2	1
Taichung	117	17	1	0	0
Taipei	89	12	6	3	1
Taoyuan	33	4	0	0	0
Hsinchu City	24	0	0	0	0
Hsinchu County	23	0	0	0	0
Tainan	8	0	0	0	0
Keelung	3	0	0	0	0
Nantou County	2	0	0	0	0
Yilan County	2	0	0	0	0
Chiayi City	1	0	0	0	0

== Tallest buildings ==
=== >150 m (490 ft) ===
This section contains a list of skyscrapers taller than 160 m (520 ft) at the highest point in Taiwan. Heights are retained from Council on Tall Buildings and Urban Habitat (CTBUH) database unless cited otherwise. The list includes only habitable buildings, as opposed to structures such as observation towers, radio masts, transmission towers and chimneys.

The tallest building in Taiwan
The building was once the tallest in Taiwan
The building has topped out

Building	Image	City/County	District	Height (m)	Height (ft)	Floor	Complete	Notes
Taipei 101 (台北101)		Taipei	Xinyi	508	1667	101	2004	11th-tallest building in the world.; Tallest building in the world from 2004 until 2010.; First building in the world to reach 500 m (1,600 ft).; Tallest building in Taiwan since 2004.
85 Sky Tower (高雄85大樓)		Kaohsiung	Lingya	348	1142	85	1997	85th-tallest building in the world.; Tallest all-steel building in Taiwan.; 41st-tallest building in Asia and tallest in Kaohsiung.; First building in Taiwan to reach 300 m (980 ft).
Taipei Sky Tower (台北天空塔)		Taipei	Xinyi	280	920	56	2024	
Taipei Nan Shan Plaza (臺北南山廣場)		Taipei	Xinyi	272	892	48	2018	239th-tallest building in the world and second-tallest in Taipei City.; Tallest completed in Taiwan in the 2010s.
Farglory THE ONE (遠雄THE ONE)		Kaohsiung	Cianjhen	267.6	878	68	2019	Tallest residential building in Taiwan.; Tallest completed in Kaohsiung in the 2010s.
Fubon Xinyi A25 (富邦信義A25總部)		Taipei	Xinyi	266.3	874	54	2022	
Shin Kong Life Tower (新光人壽保險大樓)		Taipei	Zhongzheng	244.8	803	51	1993	Tallest building in Taiwan from 1993 to 1997.
Taichung Commercial Bank Headquarters (台中之鑽)		Taichung	Xitun	225	738	38	2024	Tallest building in Taichung.
Chang-Gu World Trade Center (長谷世貿大樓)		Kaohsiung	Sanmin	221.6	727	50	1992	Tallest building in Taiwan from 1992 to 1993 and first building in Taiwan to reach 200 m (660 ft).
Far Eastern Mega Tower (板橋大遠百二期辦公大樓)		New Taipei	Banciao	220.6	724	50	2013	Tallest building in New Taipei.
Cathay Landmark (國泰置地廣場)		Taipei	Xinyi	212	696	46	2015	
Farglory Financial Center (遠雄金融中心)		Taipei	Xinyi	208	682	32	2012	
Eastern Media Group HeadquartersGroup Headquarters]] (東森恩典大樓)		New Taipei	Linkou	199	653	38	2026	
The Landmark (Taichung) (聯聚中雍大廈)		Taichung	Xitun	192	630	39	2018	Tallest completed in Taichung in the 2010s.
Neo Sky Dome Tower B (新巨蛋B)		New Taipei	Banciao	188	617	46	2010	
Han-Lai New World Center (漢來新世界中心)		Kaohsiung	Cianjin	186	610	42	1995	
Farglory 95rich (遠雄九五)		New Taipei	Xinzhuang	184	604	42	2017	
Chicony Electronics Headquarters (群光電子總部大樓)		New Taipei	Sanchong	181	594	39	2015	
HongWell i-Tower (宏匯i-Tower)		New Taipei	Xinzhuang	180.6	593	39	2021	
Panhsin Twin Towers 1 (板信雙子星花園廣場)		New Taipei	Banciao	180	590	34	2009	
Four Seasons Hotel Taipei (臺北四季酒店)		Taipei	Xinyi District	179.6	589	31	2025	
Le Meridien Taichung (臺中李方艾美酒店)		Taichung	Central	178	584	27	1998	
Neo Sky Dome Tower C (新巨蛋C)		New Taipei	Banciao	178	584	43	2010	
Neo Sky Dome Tower D (新巨蛋D)		New Taipei	Banciao	178	584	43	2010	
Shr-Hwa International Tower (世華國際大樓)		Taichung	West	177	580	47	2004	Tallest completed in Taichung in the 2000s.
Plato Palace (聯聚瑞和大廈)		Taichung	Xitun	172	564	43	2021	
Le M Residence (馥華艾美)		New Taipei	Banciao	172	564	46	2025	
Guo-Yan Building BC (國揚國硯)		Kaohsiung	Lingya	171	561	41	2013	
Asia-Pacific Financial Plaza (宏總亞太財經廣場)		Kaohsiung	Lingya	169.8	557	42	1992	
Global Strategy Center (豐邑A8市政核心)		Taichung	Xitun	169.5	556	38	2015	
National Trade Center (NTC國家商貿中心)		Taichung	Xitun	166	544	35	2018	
Taichung Condominium Tower (富邦新市政)		Taichung	Xitun	165.3	542	41	2019	
Oriental Crown (富宇東方之冠)		Taichung	Xitun	165.2	542	38	2015	
Far Eastern Plaza Tower 1 (遠企中心)		Taipei	Da'an	164.7	540	41	1994	
Far Eastern Plaza Tower 2 (遠企中心)		Taipei	Da'an	164.7	540	41	1994	
Next 100 (國城定潮)		Kaohsiung	Cianjhen	163	535	41	2021	
Treasure Garden (大陸宝格)		Taichung	Xitun	161.5	530	39	2017	
City Center Plaza (豐邑市政都心廣場)		Taichung	Xitun	161.3	529	38	2011	
Pao Huei Solitaire Tower A (寶輝秋紅谷 A棟)		Taichung	Xitun	161	528	41	2015	
Pao Huei Solitaire Tower B (寶輝秋紅谷 B棟)		Taichung	Xitun	161	528	41	2015	
Sunland 41 Tower A (森聯摩天41 A棟)		New Taipei	Linkou	160.8	528	41	2020	
Sunland 41 Tower B (森聯摩天41 B棟)		New Taipei	Linkou	160.8	528	41	2020	
The Crystal Plaza (淡水水立方)		New Taipei	Tamsui	160.6	527	41	2013	
Han-Hsien International Hotel (寒軒國際大飯店)		Kaohsiung	Lingya	160.3	526	42	1994	
Yihwa International Complex Tower A (宜華國際飯店住宅A)		Taipei	Zhongshan	160	520	45	2014	
Yihwa International Complex Tower B (宜華國際飯店住宅B)		Taipei	Zhongshan	160	520	45	2014	
Farglory U-Town (汐止遠雄U-TOWN) Tower B		New Taipei	Xizhi	160	520	37	2014	
Farglory U-Town (汐止遠雄U-TOWN) Tower C		New Taipei	Xizhi	160	520	37	2014	
Ding Sheng BHW Taiwan Central Plaza (興富發鼎盛BHW)		Taichung	Xitun	159	522	36	2014	
Royal Landmark Tower (總太東方帝國)		Taichung	Xitun	158.8	521	39	2011	
Savoy Palace (聯聚保和大廈)		Taichung	Xitun	157	515	39	2017	
He-huan Landmark Tower A (合環Landmark A棟)		New Taipei	Xindian	157	515	42	2025	
He-huan Landmark Tower B (合環Landmark B棟)		New Taipei	Xindian	157	515	42	2025	
Huaku Sky Garden (華固天鑄)		Taipei	Shilin	156.7	514	38	2016	
E Sky Mall Tower B (義享天地 B館)		Kaohsiung	Gushan	156	512	29	2024	
Kaohsiung Marriott Hotel (高雄萬豪酒店)		Kaohsiung	Gushan	156	512	31	2019	
Neo Sky Dome Tower A (新巨蛋A)		New Taipei	Banciao	156	511	40	2010	
Fubon Sky Tree (富邦天空樹)		Taichung	Xitun	155.3	510	39	2016	
Hua Nan Bank Headquarters (華南銀行總行世貿大樓)		Taipei	Xinyi	154.5	507	27	2014	
Uni-President International Tower (統一國際大樓)		Taipei	Xinyi	154	505	37	2003	
Kingtown King Park (京城京城)		Kaohsiung	Gushan	154	505	36	2015	
Nanshan Xinyi A26 (南山信義A26)		Taipei	Xinyi District	153.5	503	30	2027	
ChungYuet Royal Landmark A (中悅一品二期1)		Taoyuan	Taoyuan	153	502	38	2012	Joint-tallest buildings in Taoyuan.
ChungYuet Royal Landmark B (中悅一品二期2)		Taoyuan	Taoyuan	153	502	38	2012	
ChungYuet Royal Landmark C (中悅一品二期3)		Taoyuan	Taoyuan	153	502	38	2012	
Tuntex Highrise Building (摩天東帝市)		New Taipei	Zhonghe	153	502	41	1998	
Farglory U-Town (汐止遠雄U-TOWN) Tower A		New Taipei	Xizhi	151.8	498	35	2014	
Farglory U-Town (汐止遠雄U-TOWN) Tower D		New Taipei	Xizhi	151.8	498	35	2014	
Kee Tai Zhongxiao (基泰忠孝)		Taipei	Zhongzheng	151.5	497	37	2019	
Fountain Palace (聯聚方庭大廈)		Taichung	Xitun	151	495	39	2010	
Taipei City Hall Bus Station (市府轉運站)		Taipei	Xinyi	151	495	31	2011	
Wanin International Headquarters (網銀國際總部)		Taichung	Xitun	150.5	494	27	2025	
ChungYuet World Center (中悅世界中心)		Taoyuan	Taoyuan	150.1	492	32	2012	
Yihwa International Complex Tower C (宜華國際飯店)		Taipei	Zhongshan	150	490	42	2014	
Blue Ocean (藍海)		New Taipei	Tamsui	150	490	38	2010	
Highwealth - City of Leadership A (興富發華人匯 A棟)		Kaohsiung	Gushan	150	490	38	2016	
Highwealth - City of Leadership B (興富發華人匯 B棟)		Kaohsiung	Gushan	150	490	38	2016	

=== >120 m (390 ft) ===
Rank	Name	Image	City	Height (m)	Floors	Year	Reference
72	Cosmos (寶璽天睿)		Taichung	149.65 m (491.0 ft)	38	2018	
73	Daan King Building (大安國王大樓)		Taichung	149.5 m (490 ft)	42	1993	
73	Daan International Building (大安國際大樓)		Taichung	149.5 m (490 ft)	42	1997	
75	Vespi Tower (維士比大樓)		Kaohsiung	148 m (486 ft)	32	1998	
75	Taichung Time Square CBD (興富發CBD時代廣場)		Taichung	149	34	2015	
77	Kaohsiung Main Public Library Phase II (高雄市圖書總館第二期文創會館)		Kaohsiung	148	27	2020	
77	Xin-Fu-Hwa (馨馥華)		Kaohsiung	148	41	2000	
79	Lih-Rong An Imperial Crown Building (麗榮皇冠)		Keelung	147.7	33	2000	
80	Bridge Upto Zenith C (世界花園橋峰 C)		New Taipei	146	37	2012	
81	United Daily News Office Building (聯合報辦公大樓)		Taipei	145.6	34	2018	
82	Chuhofa Sky Building (聚合發天廈)		Taichung	144.7	38	2016	
83	Ba Ba - Central Park (巴巴中央花園)		Kaohsiung	144.4	39	2015	
84	Peace Palace (Taipei) (和平大苑)		Taipei	144	38	2014	
85	Yun Yan Building (親家雲硯)		Taichung	143.7	39	2015	
86	Tuntex Tower (敦南東帝士大樓)		Taipei	143.4	38	1990	
87	International Trade Building (國貿大樓)		Taipei	143	34	1988	
87	Long-Bang Trade Plaza (龍邦世貿大廈) Tower 1		Taichung	143 m (469 ft)	37	1991	
87	Long-Bang Trade Plaza (龍邦世貿大廈) Tower 2		Taichung	143 m (469 ft)	37	1991	
87	Grand Mayfull Hotel Taipei (美福大飯店)		Taipei	143	25	2015	
91	Fullon Hotel Chiayi (嘉義福容大飯店)		Chiayi City	142.2	33	2023	
92	Taipei Sky Dome - Tower I (巨蛋東京花園廣場A棟)		New Taipei	142	37	2005	
92	Taipei Sky Dome - Tower II (巨蛋東京花園廣場B棟)		New Taipei	142	37	2005	
92	Taipei Sky Dome - Tower III (巨蛋東京花園廣場C棟)		New Taipei	142	37	2005	
92	Taipei Sky Dome - Tower IV (巨蛋東京花園廣場D棟)		New Taipei	142	37	2005	
92	Taipei Sky Dome - Tower V (巨蛋東京花園廣場E棟)		New Taipei	142	37	2005	
92	Kaohsiung Twin Towers 1 (夢萊茵 1)		Kaohsiung	142	35	1996	
92	Kaohsiung Twin Towers 2 (夢萊茵 2)		Kaohsiung	142	35	1996	
98	Dali Palace (達麗宮廷)		Kaohsiung	141.8	35	2014	
99	International Trade Center 260 (亞太雲端)		Taichung	141.7	39	2001	
100	Caesar Park Hotel Banqiao (板橋凱撒大飯店)		New Taipei	141.4	31	2017	
101	New Taipei City Hall (新北市政府大樓)		New Taipei	140.5	34	2002	
102	Continental Engineering Corporation Tower (大陸工程敦南大樓)		Taipei	140	31	2003	
102	Taipei No.1 A (麗寶之星T1 A棟)		New Taipei	140	37	2008	
102	Shangri-La's Far Eastern Plaza Hotel Tainan (香格里拉臺南遠東國際大飯店)		Tainan	140 m (460 ft)	38	1993	Tallest building in Tainan.
104	One Park Taipei South Tower (元利信義聯勤 南棟)		Taipei	139.5	35	2018	
105	Ling-Ding Tower (林鼎高峰大廈)		Taichung	139.4	33	1994	
106	CTBC Financial Park Block A (中國信託金融園區 A棟)		Taipei	139	30	2013	
106	Bridge Upto Zenith B (世界花園橋峰 B)		New Taipei	139	35	2012	
108	The Palace (臺中帝寶)		Taichung	138.5	35	2016	
109	Ruentex Nangang Station Complex Tower A (潤泰南港車站大樓 A棟)		Taipei	138.3	30	2015	
109	Ruentex Nangang Station Complex Tower B (潤泰南港車站大樓 B棟)		Taipei	138.3	30	2015	
111	Four Seasons (四季天韻)		Taichung	137.7	35	2009	
112	Taipei No.1 B (麗寶之星T1 B棟)		New Taipei	137	36	2008	
112	Taipei No.1 C (麗寶之星T1 C棟)		New Taipei	137	36	2008	
112	King's Town Hyatt (京城凱悅)		Kaohsiung	137	35	2009	
115	The View (極景)		New Taipei	136.9	36	2000	
116	Chicony Star Residential Building (群光之星)		New Taipei	136.2	35	2019	
116	The Diamond (長虹潭美科技大樓)		Taipei	136.2	30	2021	
118	Chung Tai Chan Monastery (中臺禪寺)		Puli, Nantou	136	16	2001	
119	The Splendor Hotel Taichung (臺中金典酒店)		Taichung	135.65	32	1998	
120	Bao-Cheng Enterprise Tower (寶成企業大樓)		Kaohsiung	135	37	1991	
120	China Steel Corporation Headquarters (中鋼集團總部大樓)		Kaohsiung	135	29	2012	
120	Ellipse 360 (天境360)		New Taipei	135	38	2012	
120	CIWC Tower (豐邑雲智匯)		Hsinchu City	135	30	2016	
120	Cathay Central Plaza (國泰中央廣場)		Kaohsiung	135	30	2000	
120	Grand Forever 1 (由鉅大恆 1)		Taichung	135	35	2016	
120	Grand Forever 2 (由鉅大恆 2)		Taichung	135	35	2016	
127	Tungs' Taichung Metroharbor Hospital (童綜合醫院)		Taichung	134.2	26	2008	
128	Walsin Lihwa Building (華新麗華大樓)		Taipei	134	27	2009	
128	Diamond Towers C (台北之星C)		Taipei	134	31	2022	
130	Bridge Upto Zenith A (世界花園橋峰 A)		New Taipei	133	33	2012	
130	Skyline Landmark A (長虹天際 A)		New Taipei	133	36	2014	
130	Skyline Landmark B (長虹天際 B)		New Taipei	133	36	2014	
133	Art Deco Landmark (富宇世界之匯)		Taichung	132.9	32	2018	
134	CTBC Taichung Headquarters (中信金控臺中金融大樓)		Taichung	132.2	28	2017	
135	Global Giant Tower (環球巨星大樓)		Taichung	132.1	33	1991	
136	An-Tai Tower (安泰登峰)		New Taipei	130	31	2002	
136	Ambassador Hotel Hsinchu (新竹國賓大飯店)		Hsinchu	130	24	2001	
136	Oman TiT (阿曼TiT)		Taipei	130	27	2012	
136	Diamond Towers AB (台北之星AB)		Taipei	130	30	2022	
140	Du Show (聚合發獨秀)		Taichung	129.7	34	2013	
141	Cathay Zhonghua Tower (國泰中華大樓)		Taipei	129.5	28	2022	
142	Shr-Hwa Financial Center (世華金融大樓)		Kaohsiung	129	30	1996	
143	Glory Tower (東方帝景大樓)		Keelung	128.28	31	2007	
144	Taiwan Power Building (臺電大樓)		Taipei	127.4	27	1983	
145	La Bella Vita (丽格)		Taichung	127	33	2020	
145	SkyCity Tower (天空之城)		New Taipei	127	34	1995	
145	55 Timeless (琢白)		Taipei	127	31	2018	
148	Cathay Shi-Wei Financial Center (國泰四維財經大樓)		Kaohsiung	126	27	2001	
148	One Park Taipei North Tower (元利信義聯勤 北棟)		Taipei	126	31	2018	
150	Hsiung Kang Sin Yi Art Museum (雄崗信義美術館)		Kaohsiung	125.6	33	2018	
151	T-Power (親家市政廣場)		Taichung	125.5	28	2017	
152	Chia Heir Tower (佳和大樓)		Tainan	125.2	19	2002	
153	Bridge Upto Zenith D (世界花園橋峰 D)		New Taipei	125	31	2012	
153	YeaShin Sky Tree A (亞昕晴空樹 A)		New Taipei	125	33	2017	
153	YeaShin Sky Tree B (亞昕晴空樹 B)		New Taipei	125	33	2017	
153	A+7 (德鑫 A+7)		Zhubei	125	32	2015	
157	Fubon Banking Center (富邦金融中心大樓)		Taipei	124	24	1995	
157	Windsor Hotel Taichung (裕元花園酒店)		Taichung	124	30	2005	
159	Financial Star Building (世貿財星廣場)		Zhongli	123.7	30	1993	
160	Taishin International Bank Tower (台新金控大樓)		Taipei	123.1	25	2005	
161	Universal Industrial Headquarters (環宇實業總部大樓)		Taichung	123	32	1990	
161	International Star Diamond Tower (國際星鑽大樓)		New Taipei	123	30	1993	
161	Jun Pin Yuan A (寶石君品苑 A)		New Taipei	123	31	2014	
161	Jun Pin Yuan B (寶石君品苑 B)		New Taipei	123	31	2014	
161	Lai Po (麗寶芙蓉匯)		Taoyuan	123	28	2015	
166	T3 (親家T3市政國際中心)		Taichung	122.8	29	2013	
167	Times Regal Tower (時代富豪優生企業大樓)		Kaohsiung	122	29	1999	
167	Sotai Xinyi (首泰信義)		Taipei	122	34	2018	
169	Long-Bang Building (龍邦國寶大廈)		Taichung	120	30	1992	
169	Pao Chen Corporation Headquarter (寶成企業總部大樓)		Taichung	120	23	2005	
169	Grand Palace (聯聚信義住宅大樓)		Taichung	120	29	2009	

== Under construction (150 m (490 ft)+) ==
Rank	Name	City	Height (m)	Floors	Expected completion year	Reference					
Rank	Name	City	Height (m)	Floors	Expected completion year	1	Taipei Twin Tower 1 (臺北雙子星大樓 1)	Taipei	360	70	2028
2	Highwealth Huiguo 90 (興富發惠國段90案)	Taichung	323.5	63	2028						
3	Taipei Twin Tower 2 (臺北雙子星大樓 2)	Taipei	280	53	2028						
4	New Kinpo Group Headquarters (金仁寶總部大樓)	Taipei	266	55	2026						
5	Fubon Aozihdi North Tower (富邦凹子底北塔)	Kaohsiung	239.8	48	2028						
6	Nanshan Xinyi A21 (南山綠環塔)	Taipei	232.6	43	2028						
7	Kuma Tower (聯聚中維大廈)	Taichung	208	42	2026						
8	Gateway Plaza South Tower (未來之心二期)	Zhubei	204	42	2029						
9	Alioth Palace (聯聚玉衡大廈)	Taichung	202	51	2030						
10	Taiwan Summit Tower (允將TST台灣之鑽)	Taichung	182.55	40	2029						
11	Landmark Plaza Taichung (置地廣場台中)	Taichung	175	34	2026						
12	Highwealth Huiguo 88 (興富發惠國段88案)	Taichung	170.4	33	2026						
13	Jung Heng Palace (聯聚中衡大廈)	Taichung	169	37	2026						
14	Nanshan Xinyi A26 (南山A26)	Taipei	153.3	30	2027						

== Approved or proposed ==
Building	Height (m/ft)	Floors	Scheduled completion	City	Status
Xinyi 130 信宜一點三十分	700 m (2,296 ft)	130	2040	Taipei	proposed
Asia Plaza 亞洲企業中心	431 m (1,414 ft)	103	2030	Kaohsiung	Proposed
Tai-Tang Commercial Tower 1 臺糖港埠商業大樓	405 m (1,329 ft)	95	2010	Kaohsiung	Cancelled
Intelligence Operation Center 智慧營運中心	262 m (860 ft)	46	2022	Taichung	Proposed
Fong Yi Huiguo 174 豐邑惠國段174案	253.5 m (832 ft)	53	2026	Taichung	Proposed
Foxconn Kaohsiung Flagship Headquarters; Y15鴻海亞灣旗艦總部	234 m (768 ft)	45	2033	Kaohsiung	Proposed
CHP Tower 中華郵政塔	203.5 m (668 ft)	44	2032	Taipei	Approved
Fong Yi Huimin 118 豐邑惠民段118案	192 m (630 ft)	50	2025	Taichung	Proposed
Chingjia Tower 親家營運總部大樓	182.6 m (599 ft)	40	2025	Taichung	Proposed
Taiwan Rail Towers E1/E2 臺鐵E1/E2	?	42 and 39	?	Taipei	Proposed

== Timeline of tallest buildings ==
Name	Image	City	Years as tallest	Height (m) (ft)	Floors	Reference
Office of the Governor-General of Taiwan/ Office of the President of the Republic of China (臺灣總督府/中華民國總統府)		Taipei	1919–1972	60 m (200 ft)	9	
Hilton Hotel Taipei (臺北希爾頓大飯店)		Taipei	1972–1973	71 m (233 ft)	20	
Grand Hotel (圓山大飯店)		Taipei	1973–1981	87 m (285 ft)	12	
First Commercial Bank Building (第一銀行總行大樓)		Taipei	1981–1983	87.7 m (288 ft)	22	
Taiwan Power Building (台電大樓)		Taipei	1983–1988	127 m (417 ft)	27	
International Trade Building (國貿大樓)		Taipei	1988–1990	142.6 m (468 ft)	34	
Tuntex Tower (敦南東帝士大樓)		Taipei	1990–1992	143.4 m (470 ft)	38	
Asia-Pacific Financial Plaza (宏總亞太財經廣場)		Kaohsiung	1992–1993	169.8 m (557 ft)	42	
Chang-Gu World Trade Center (長谷世貿大樓)		Kaohsiung	1993–1993	222 m (728 ft)	50	
Shin Kong Life Tower (新光人壽保險大樓)		Taipei	1993–1997	244.8 m (803 ft)	51	
85 Sky Tower (高雄85大樓)		Kaohsiung	1997–2004	347.5 m (1,140 ft)	85	
Taipei 101 (臺北101)		Taipei	2004–present	509.2 m (1,671 ft)	101	

== Tallest buildings ==
=== Tallest buildings by region ===
Area	Building	Image	Location	Height m (ft)	Number of floors	Complete	Notes
Northern	Taipei 101		Taipei	508 m (1,667 ft)	101	2004	
Southern	85 Sky Tower		Kaohsiung	347.5 m (1,140 ft)	85	1997	
Central	Taichung Commercial Bank Headquarters		Taichung	225 m (738 ft)	38	2025	
Eastern	World Bay		Toucheng, Yilan County	105.8 m (347 ft)	29	2017	
Outlying Islands	Four points by Sheraton Penghu		Penghu	78.5 m (258 ft)	11	2014	

=== Tallest buildings by city ===
This is the list of the tallest buildings that are taller than 120 m (390 ft) by city in Taiwan.

City	Name	Image	Height m (ft)	Floors	Year	Notes
Taipei	Taipei 101		508 m (1,667 ft)	101	2004	
Kaohsiung	85 Sky Tower		347.5 m (1,140 ft)	85	1997	
Taichung	Taichung Commercial Bank Headquarters		225 m (738 ft)	38	2024	
New Taipei City	Far Eastern Mega Tower		220.6 m (724 ft)	50	2013	
Taoyuan	ChungYuet Royal Landmark		153 m (502 ft)	38	2012	
Tainan	Shangri-La's Far Eastern Plaza Hotel Tainan		152 m (499 ft)	38	1993	
Keelung	Lih-Rong An Imperial Crown Building		148 m (486 ft)	34	2000	
Chiayi City	Fullon Hotel Chiayi		142 m (466 ft)	33	2023	
Puli, Nantou	Chung Tai Chan Monastery		136 m (446 ft)	16	2001	
Hsinchu City	CIWC Tower		135 m (443 ft)	30	2016	
Zhubei	Wonder World 520		129 m (423 ft)	32	2023	

== Gallery ==
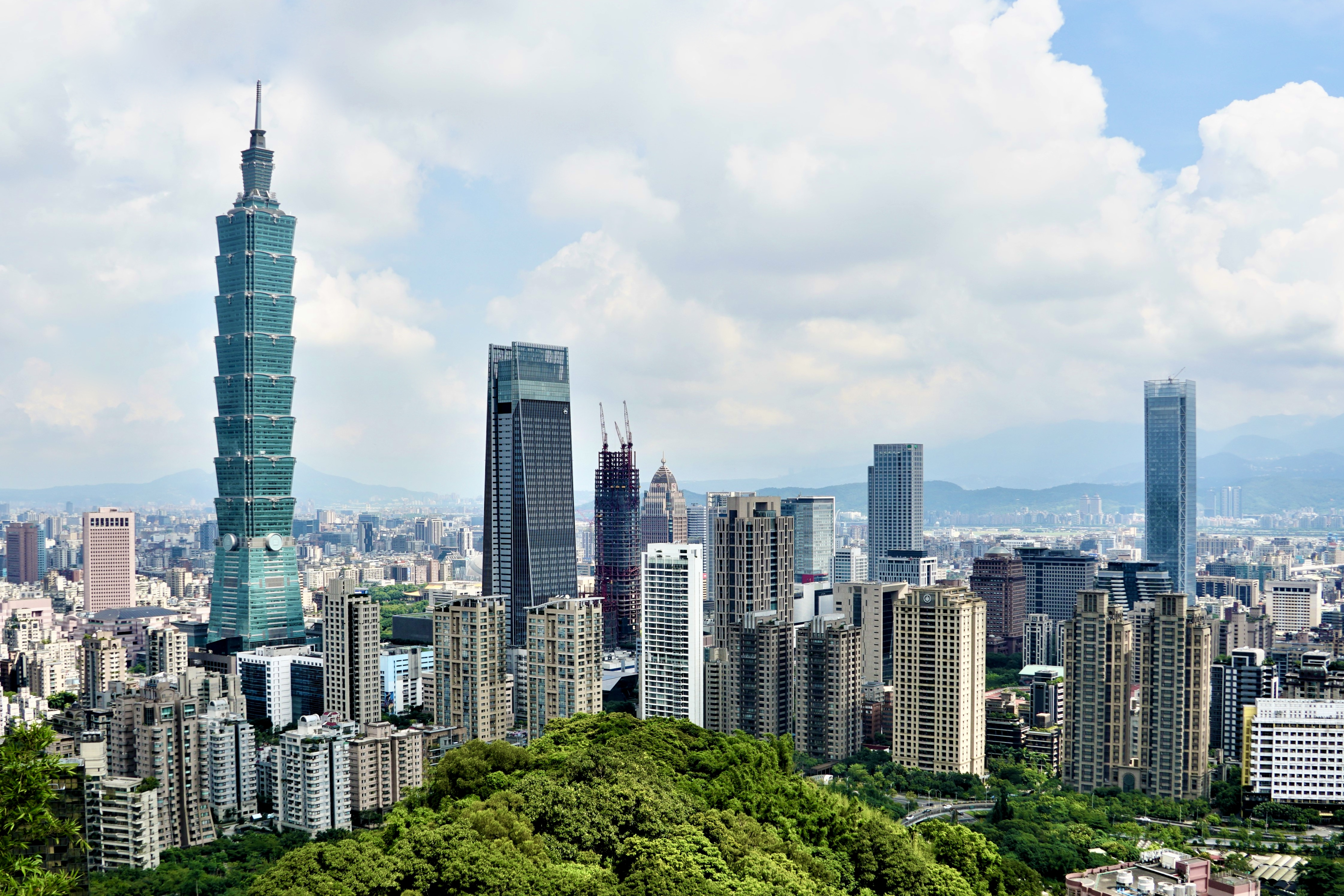
Skyline of Taipei

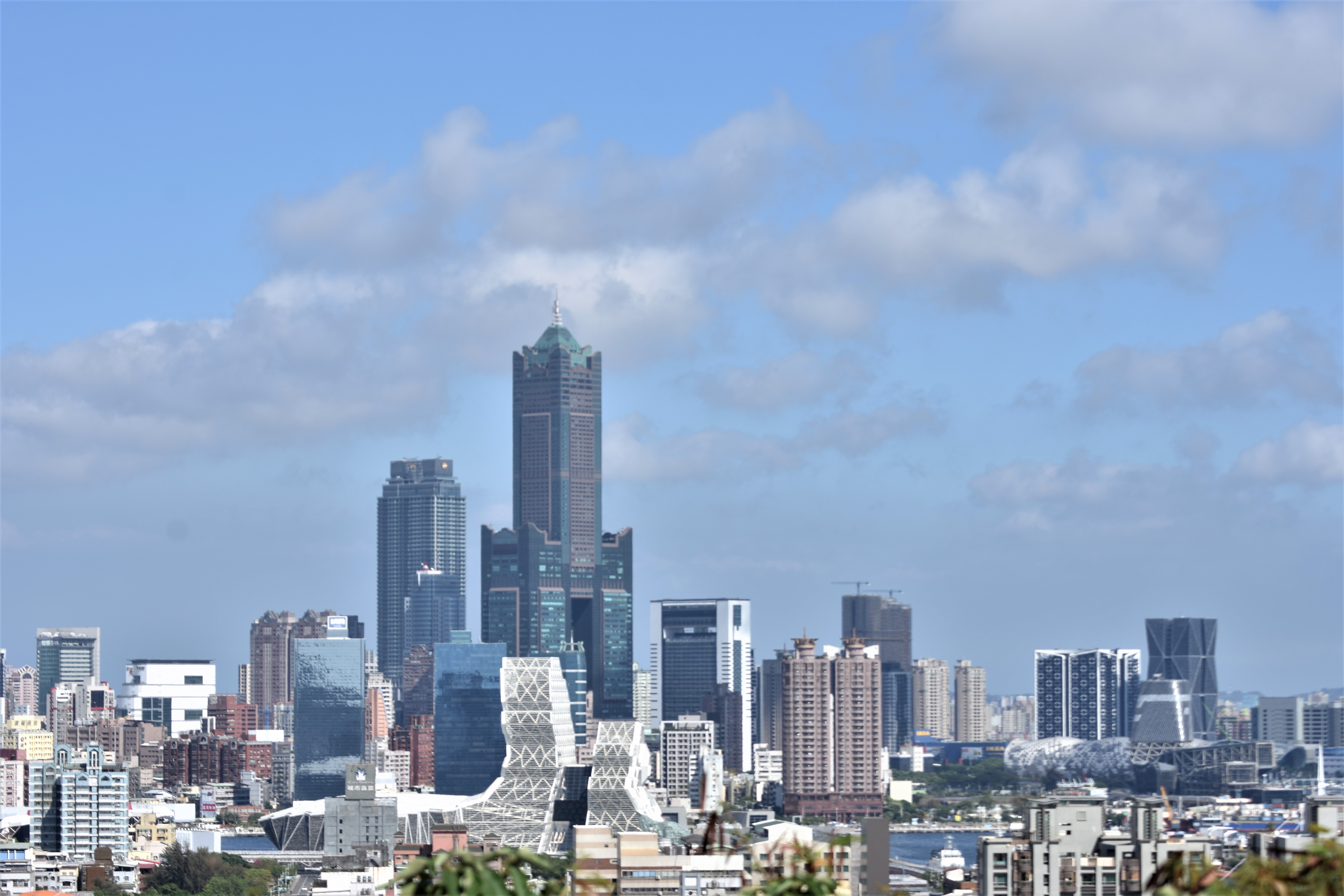
Skyline of Kaohsiung, the second largest city in Taiwan

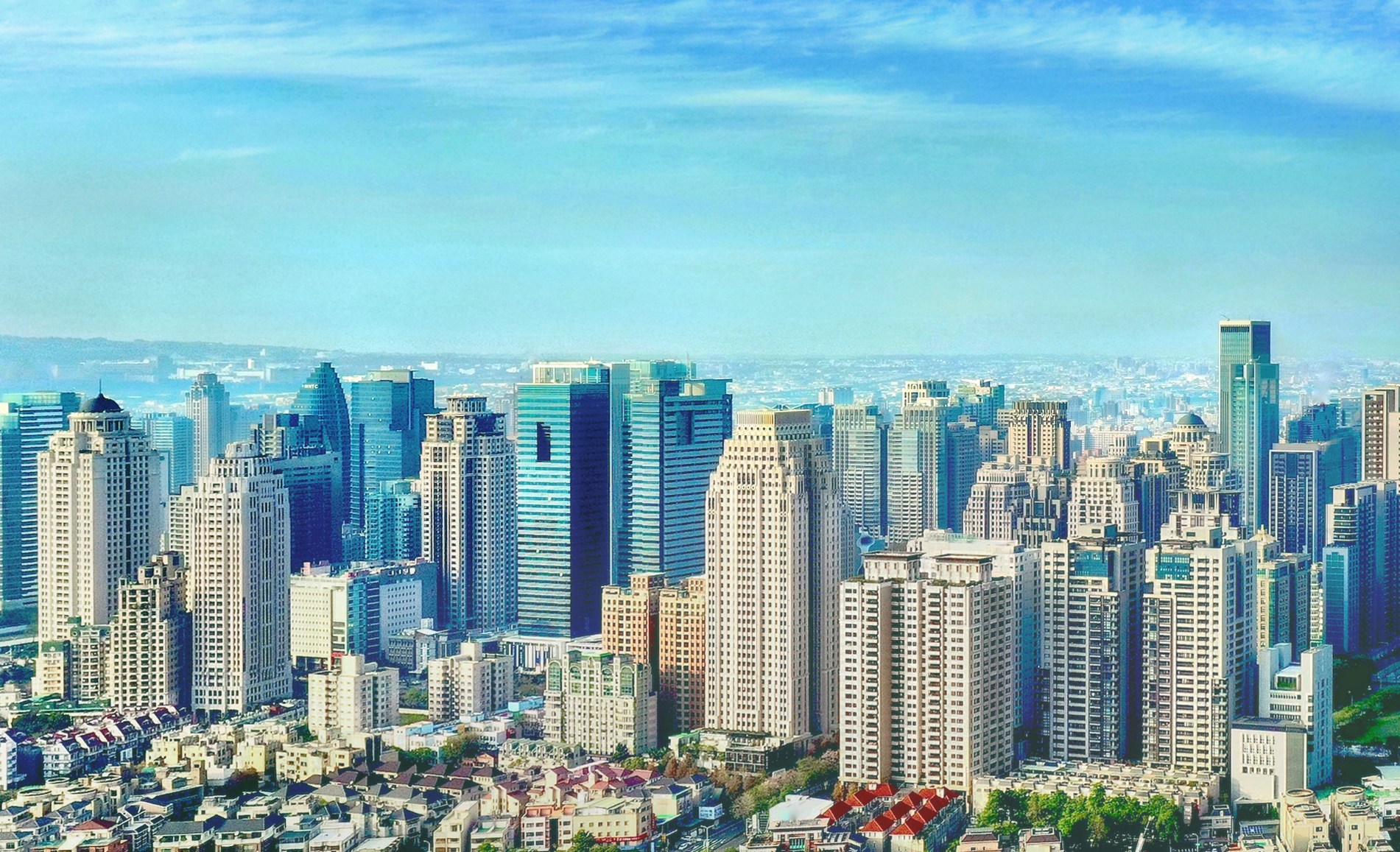
Taichung, home to the highest number of high-rises in Taiwan

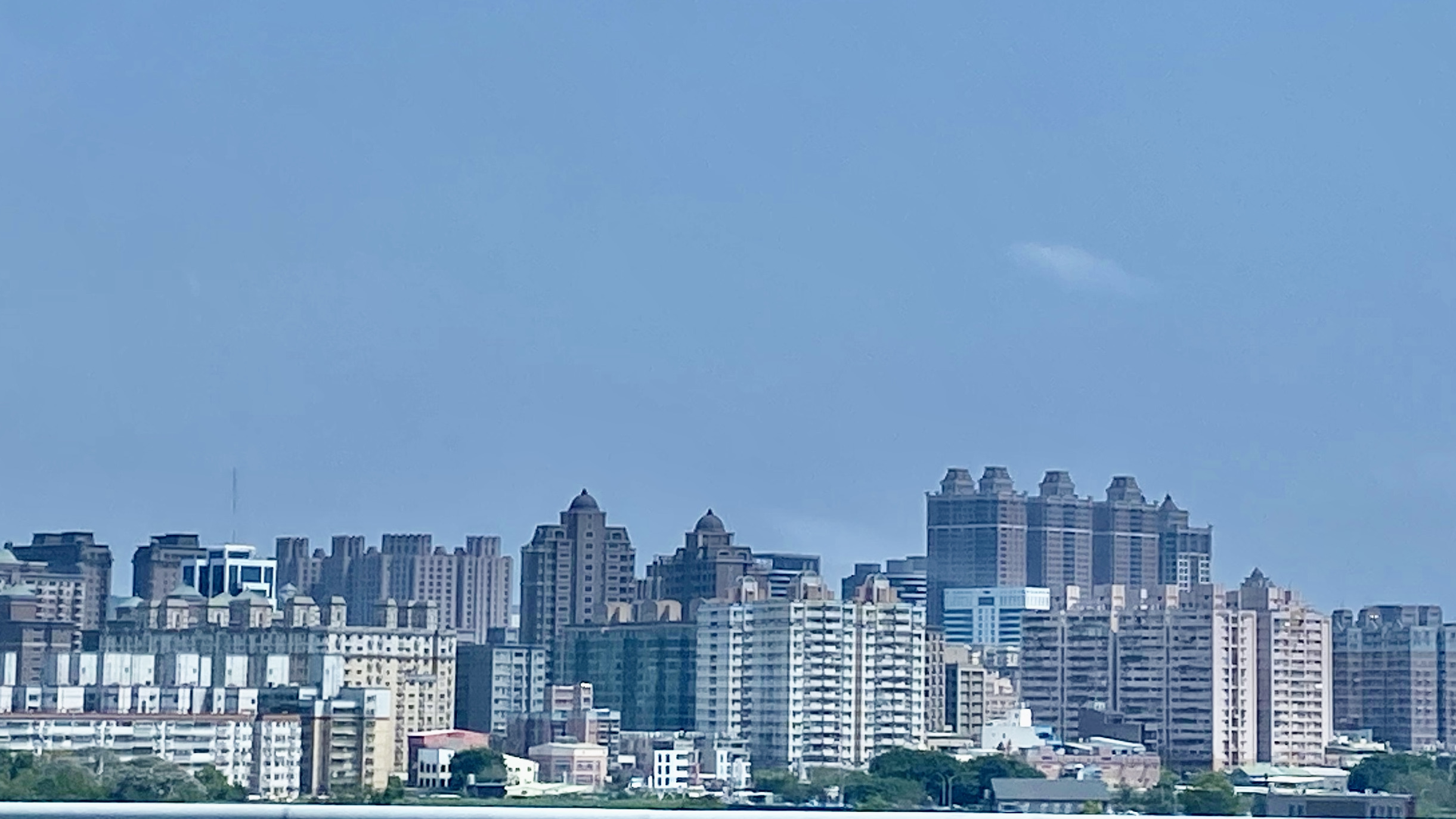
Skyline of Taoyuan

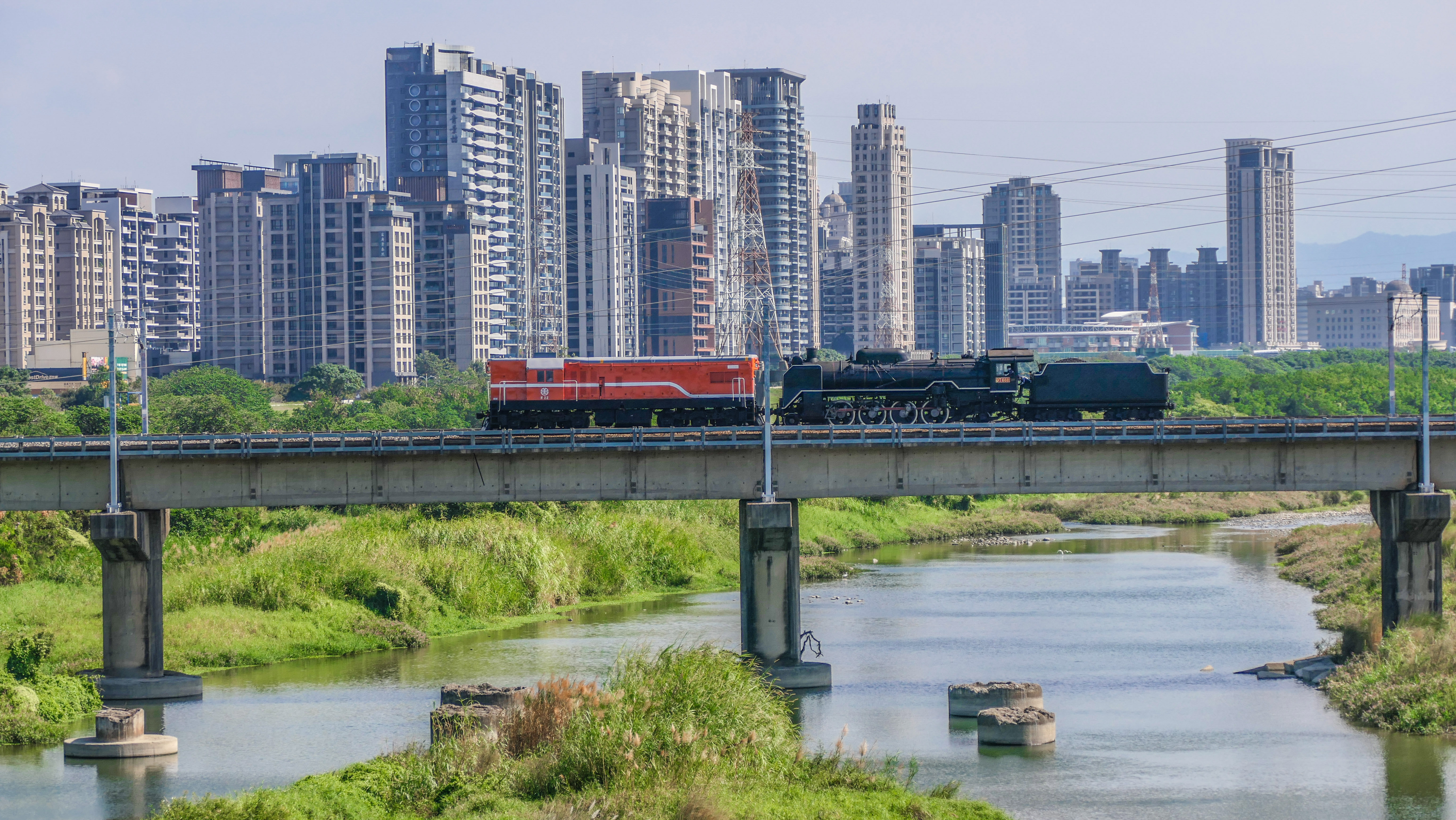
Skyline of Zhubei

== Non-habitable buildings ==
List of tallest non-habitable buildings in Taiwan

=== Chimneys ===
Name	Town	Coordinates	Height	Year of construction	Remarks
Chimneys of Taichung Power Plant	Taichung	24.209390 N 120.483955 E; 24.211332 N 120.484765 E; 24.212854 N 120.485811 E; 24.214693 N 120.486594 E; 24.218216 N 120.472555 E	250 m	1991-2005	5 colourful-painted chimneys
Chimney of Hoping Power Plant	Xulin	24.307792 N 121.763502 E	250 m	2002
Chimneys of Hsinta Power Plant	Kaohsiung	22.856755 N 120.196262 E; 22.854994 N 120.196738 E	250 m		2 lattice-steel chimneys
Chimneys of Mailiao Power Plant	Mailiao	23.802176 N 120.188386 E; 23.804566 N 120.189748 E	250 m		2 chimneys
Chimneys of Hsieh-ho Power Plant	Keelung	25.156244 N 121.740210 E; 25.156628 N 121.739816 E; 25.157407 N 121.738665 E	200 m	1977-1980	3 chimneys
Chimney of Linkou Power Plant	New Taipei	25.122532 N 121.300308 E	168 m
Chimney of Coke Oven Plant of Kaohsiung China Steel Works	Kaohsiung	22.542442 N 120.347792 E	156 m	2022
Chimney of Bali Incinerator	New Taipei	22.534862 N 120.336117 E	150.5 m		Square cross section
Chimney of Unit 1 & 2 of Talin Power Plant	Kaohsiung	22.536884 N 120.333692 E	150 m		Lattice-steel chimney, demolished in 2012
Chimney of Unit 3 & 4 of Talin Power Plant	Kaohsiung	22.536366 N 120.334933 E	150 m		Lattice-steel chimney, demolished in 2021
Chimney of Unit 5 of Talin Power Plant	Kaohsiung	22.535664 N 120.335560 E	150 m		Lattice-steel chimney
Chimney of Unit 6 of Talin Power Plant	Kaohsiung	22.534862 N 120.336117 E	150 m
Chimney of Beitou Refuse Incineration Plant	Taipei	25.108038 N 121.499413 E	150 m	1991	Revolving restaurant 120 metres above ground and observation deck 116 metres above ground
Chimney of Muzha Refuse Incineration Plant	Taipei	25.005005 N 121.587649 E	150 m	1994
Chimneys of Olefin Plant of Mailiao Refinery	Mailiao	23.808295 N 120.212693 E; 23.807452 N 120.212235	150 m		2 chimneys
Chimney of Lungmen Nuclear Power Plant	New Taipei	25.037858 N 121.923503 E	146.5 m	2012
Chimney of Dragon Steel P1 Coke Oven	Taichung	24.224297 N 120.490934 E	141.8 m
Chimney of Dragon Steel P2 Coke Oven	Taichung	24.225016 N 120.488917 E	141.8 m	2009
Chimney of Unit 7 and 8 of Talin Power Plant	Kaohsiung	22.535529 N 120.330591 E	126 m	2014
Chimney of Unit 6 of Tunghsiao Power Plant	Tongxiao	24.489431 N 120.667332 E	122 m	1998
Chimneys of Unit 1, 2 and 3 of Tunghsiao Power Plant	Tongxiao	24.488895 N 120.672067 E; 24.49004 N 120.67042 E; 24.490665 N 120.669469 E	120 m		3 chimneys, demolished in 2019
Chimney of Lizer Refuse Incineration Plant	Wuje	24.661141 N 121.835777 E	120 m	2005
Chimney of Houli Refuse Incineration Plant	Taichung	24.287704 N 120.697332 E	120 m	2000
Chimney of Chengxi Refuse Incineration Plant	Tainan	23.045552 N 120.074607 E	120 m	1999
Chimney of Xindian Refuse Incineration Plant	New Taipei	24.958660 N 121.497693 E	120 m	1994
Chimney of Taichung Refuse Incineration Plant	Taichung	24.152727 N 120.598155 E	120 m	1993
Chimney of Lutsao Refuse Incineration Plant	Lucao	23.448925 N 120.279920 E	120 m	1990
Chimney of Jenwu Refuse Incineration Plant	Kaohsiung	22.699369 N 120.368164 E	118.8 m	1998
Chimney of His-Chou Refuse Incineration Plant	Xizhou	23.826467 N 120.460306 E	118.3 m	1999
Chimney of Shulin Refuse Incineration Plant	New Taipei	24.966867 N 121.380378 E	118 m	1992
Chimneys of Unit 4 + 5 of Tunghsiao Power Plant	Tongxiao	24.490649 N 120.668056 E; 24.490495 N 120.668303 E	118 m	1991	2 chimneys
Chimney of Yongkang Refuse Incineration Plant	Tainan	23.040425 N 120.282887 E	102 m	2007	Square cross section
Chimney of Wuri Refuse Incineration Plant	Taichung	24.096215 N 120.619634 E	100 m	2004
Chimney of Zhubei Incineration Plant	Zhubei	24.876336 N 120.952518 E	100 m	2023
Chimney of Kaohsiung Refuse Incineration Plant	Kaohsiung	22.665491 N 120.331464 E	100 m	1999
Chimney of Kanding Refuse Incineration Plant	Kanding	22.499740 N 120.498531 E	100 m	1998	Square cross section
Chimney of Keelung Refuse Incineration Plant	Keelung	25.122545 N 121.776384 E	100 m	1998	Square cross section

=== Guyed masts ===
Name	Town	Coordinates	Height	Year of construction	Remarks
Changzhi Mediumwave Transmitter, Western Antenna	Changzhi Township	22.688735 N 120.576878 E; 22.689988 N 120.577696 E; 22.690369 N 120.577030 E; 22.689122 N 120.576212 E	168 m		4 mast radiators, insulated against ground, used for broadcasting on 927 kHz, demolished

=== Lattice towers ===
Name	Town	Coordinates	Height	Year of construction	Remarks
Towers of Lukang transmitter of Radio Taiwan International	Lukang	24.067669 N 120.421982 E; 24.067062 N 120.422699 E; 24.066036 N 120.420303 E; 24.065414 N 120.420998 E	125 m	1969	4 tower radiators, insulated against ground, used for broadcasting on 603 kHz, on September 27, 2016 partly destroyed by Typhoon Megi

Source: https://skyscraperpage.com/diagrams/?

== See also ==
- List of tallest buildings
- List of tallest buildings in Taipei
- List of tallest buildings in New Taipei City
- List of tallest buildings in Kaohsiung
- List of tallest buildings in Taichung
- List of tallest buildings in Tainan
- List of tallest buildings in Taoyuan City
