= Tuntex Highrise Building =

Residential building in New Taipei, Taiwan

Tuntex Highrise Building 摩天東帝市
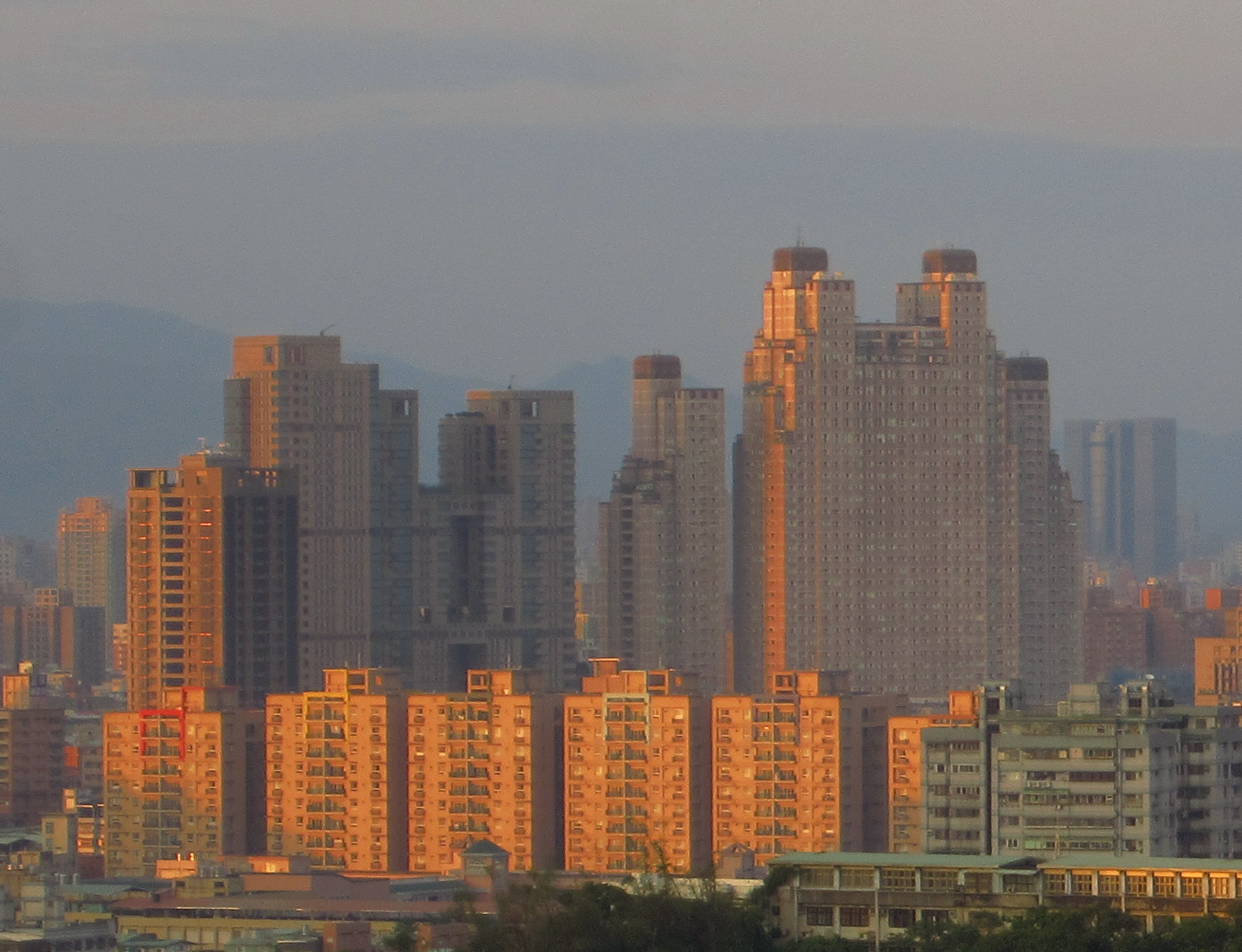
- Interactive map of the Tuntex Highrise Building 摩天東帝市 area

General information
- Status: Completed
- Type: Residential
- Location: Zhonghe District, New Taipei, Taiwan
- Coordinates: 24°59′33″N 121°30′59″E
- Completed: 1998

Height
- Architectural: 153 metres (502 ft)

Technical details
- Floor count: 41
- Floor area: 152,036.57 m^{2} (1,636,508.0 sq ft)

The Tuntex Highrise Building (Chinese: 摩天東帝市; pinyin: Mótiān dōng dì shì) is a residential skyscraper located in Zhonghe District, New Taipei, Taiwan. As of December 2020, it is the 14th tallest building in New Taipei. The height of the building is 153 m (502 ft), the floor area is 152,036.57 m^{2} (1,636,508.0 sq ft), and it comprises 41 floors above ground, as well as six basement levels.

== See also ==
- List of tallest buildings in Taiwan
- List of tallest buildings in New Taipei City
