= List of tallest buildings in Taichung =

Skyline of Taichung
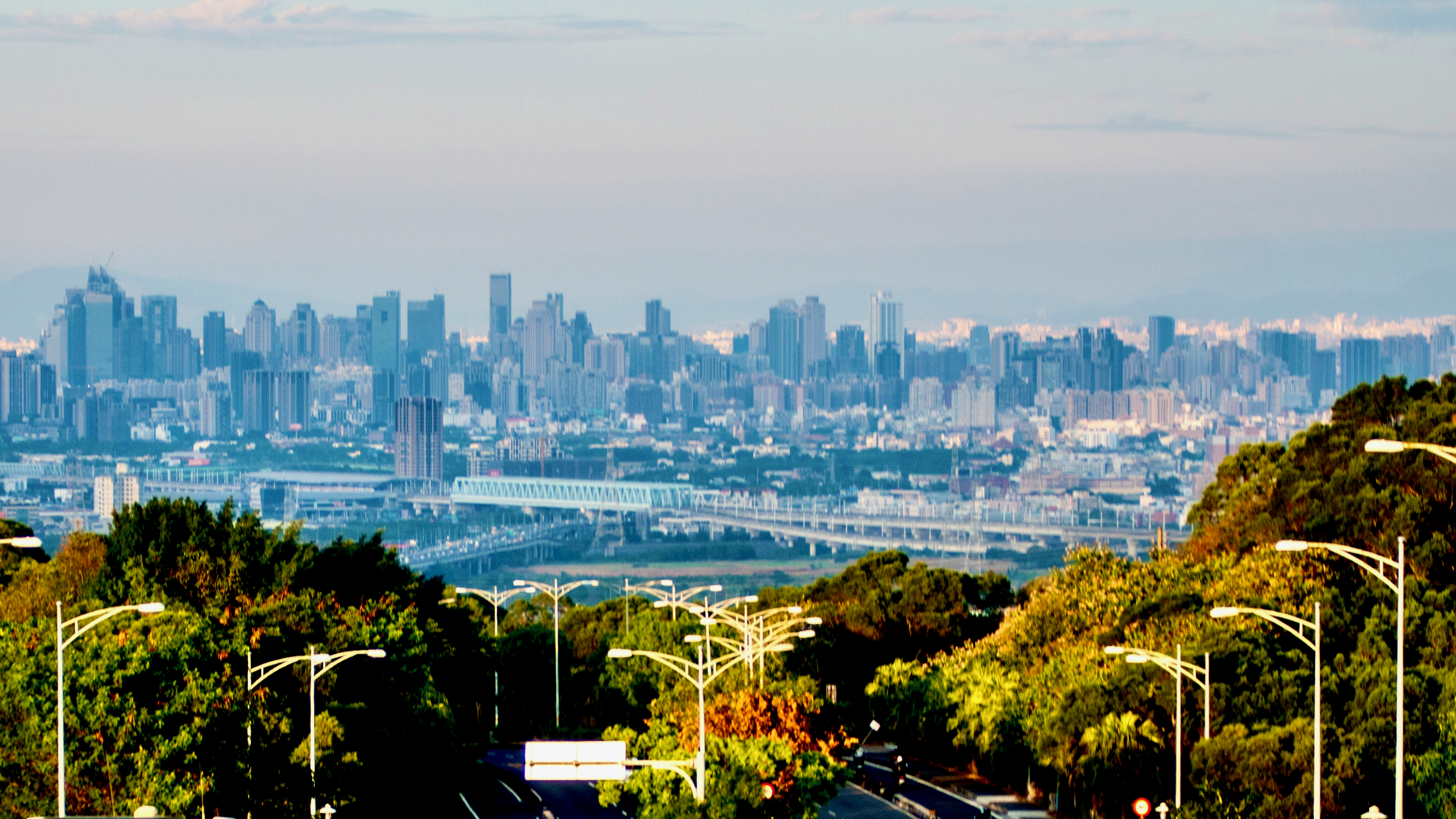
- Skyline of Taichung in 2023
- Tallest building: Taichung Commercial Bank Headquarters (2024)
- Tallest building height: 225 m (738 ft)
- First 150 m+ building: Le Meridien Taichung (1998)

Number of tall buildings
- Taller than 100 m (328 ft): 109 (2025)
- Taller than 150 m (492 ft): 18 (2025)
- Taller than 200 m (656 ft): 1 (2025)

This list of tallest buildings in Taichung lists the tallest buildings in Taichung by height. Taichung, located in Central Taiwan, is the second largest city in Taiwan by population, with a population of more than 2.8 million. As of March 2024, Taichung has 18 buildings over 150 meters (492 ft) in height.

Taichung is the employment, life and economic center of central Taiwan. Along with the development of industry and commerce, there was a boom in building skyscrapers in Taiwan in the 1990s. At present, there are 54 high-rise buildings built above 120 meters (including roofing and reconstruction) in Taichung City.

The first skyscraper in Taichung took shape around this period. Skyscrapers built during this period were mainly distributed on both sides of Section 2 of Taiwan Boulevard (original Taichung Port Road,) at the junction of the West District and North District. The second skyscraper settlement in Taichung is located on the north side of Taichung's 7th Redevelopment Zone in Xitun District. At present, almost all tall buildings over 120 meters are in this area. There are 35 buildings that have been completed and topped out(2021.) more than two-thirds of the city's tall buildings above 120 meters are in this area.

The first buildings to surpass 150 metres (492 ft) in Taichung is the 37–story Long-Bang Trade Plaza complex, which were completed in 1993 and are each 160 m (520 ft) tall. Currently, the tallest building in Taichung is the 47–story The Landmark (Taichung), which rises 192 metres (630 ft) and was completed in 2018.

There are currently several skyscrapers under construction or proposed in Taichung, including the Taichung Commercial Bank Headquarters, which is under construction and will reach 225 metres (738 ft) when completed in 2023 and the Intelligence Operation Center, which is currently under planning and will reach 262 metres (860 ft).

== Tallest buildings ==
As of September 2020, the list of buildings in Taichung at least 120 m (390 ft) meters high is as follows according to Emporis, Skyscraperpage and the Council on Tall Buildings and Urban Habitat. An equal sign (=) following a rank indicates the same height between two or more buildings. The "Year" column indicates the year of completion. The list includes only habitable buildings, as opposed to structures such as observation towers, radio masts, transmission towers and chimneys.

Rank	Name	Image	Height	Floors	Year	District	Use	Notes
1	Taichung Commercial Bank Headquarters (臺中之鑽)		225 m	38	2025	Xitun District	Office	
2	The Landmark (Taichung) (聯聚中雍大廈)		192 m	39	2018	Xitun District	Office	
3	Le Meridien Taichung (臺中李方艾美酒店)		178 m	27	1998	Central District	Office	
4	Shr-Hwa International Tower (世華國際大樓)		176.65 m	47	2004	West District	Office	
5	Plato Palace (聯聚瑞和大廈)		172.8 m	43	2021	Xitun District	Residential	
6	Global Strategy Center (豐邑A8市政核心)		169.5 m	38	2015	Xitun District	Office	
7	National Trade Center (NTC國家商貿中心)		165.65 m	35	2018	Xitun District	Office	
8	Taichung Condominium Tower (富邦新市政)		165.3 m	41	2019	Xitun District	Residential	
9	Oriental Crown (富宇東方之冠)		165.2 m	36	2014	Xitun District	Residential	
10	Treasure Garden (大陸宝格)		161.5 m	39	2017	Xitun District	Residential	
11	City Center Plaza (豐邑市政都心廣場)		176.3 m (Top); 161.3 m (Architectural)	38	2011	Xitun District	Office	
12	Pao Huei Solitaire1 (寶輝秋紅谷 1)		161 m	41	2015	Xitun District	Residential	
12=	Pao Huei Solitaire2 (寶輝秋紅谷 2)		161 m	41	2015	Xitun District	Residential	
14	Ding Sheng BHW Taiwan Central Plaza (興富發鼎盛BHW)		159 m	36	2014	Xitun District	Office	
15	Royal Landmark Tower (總太東方帝國)		158.8 m	39	2011	Xitun District	Residential	
16	Savoy Palace (聯聚保和大樓)		157 m	39	2017	Xitun District	Residential	
17	Fubon Sky Tree (富邦天空樹)		155.3 m	39	2016	West District	Residential	
18	Fountain Palace (聯聚方庭大廈)		151 m	39	2010	Xitun District	Residential	
19	Cosmos (寶璽天睿)		149.65 m	38	2018	Xitun District	Residential	
20	Daan King Building (大安國王大樓)		181.3 m (Top); 149.5 m (Architectural)	42	1993	South District	Office	
20=	Daan International Building (大安國際大樓)		181.3 m (Top); 149.5 m (Architectural)	42	1997	South District	Office	
22	Taichung Time Square CBD (興富發CBD時代廣場)		149 m	34	2015	Xitun District	Office	
23	Chuhofa Sky Building (聚合發天廈)		144.7 m	38	2016	Xitun District	Residential	
24	Yun Yan Building (親家雲硯)		143.7 m	39	2015	Xitun District	Residential	
25	Long-Bang Trade Plaza 1 (龍邦世貿大樓A棟)		143 m	37	1991	West District	Office	
25=	Long-Bang Trade Plaza 2 (龍邦世貿大樓B棟)		143 m	37	1991	West District	Office	
27	International Trade Center 260 (亞太雲端)		141.7 m	28 (de jure); 39 (de facto)	2013	North District	Office	
28	The Heritage Grand Tower (興富發百達富裔)		140.35 m	35	2011	Xitun District	Residential	
29	Ling-Ding Tower (林鼎高峰大廈)		165 m (Top); 139.4 m (Architectural)	33	1994	West District	Office	
30	The Palace (臺中帝寶)		138.5 m	35	2016	Xitun District	Residential	
31	Four Seasons (興富發四季天韻)		137.7 m	35	2010	Xitun District	Residential	
32	The Splendor Hotel Taichung (日華金典酒店)		135.65 m	32	1998	West District	Hotel	
33	Grand Forever 1 (由鉅大恆 1)	Grand Forever 由鉅大恆	135 m	35	2016	West District	Residential	
33=	Grand Forever 2 (由鉅大恆 2)	Grand Forever 由鉅大恆	135 m	35	2016	West District	Residential	
35	Tungs' Taichung Metro Harbor Hospital (童綜合醫院)	Tungs' Hospital	134.2 m	25	2001	Wuqi District	Hospital	
36	Art Deco Landmark (富宇世界之匯)		132.9 m	32	2018	Xitun District	Residential	
37	CTBC Middle-Taiwan Headquarters (中國信託大樓)		132.2 m	28	2017	Xitun District	Office	
38	Global Giant Tower (環球巨星大樓)		132.1 m	33	1991	Beitun District	Office	
39	Bai Da Fu Li (興富發百達馥麗)		131.2 m	34	2010	West District	Residential	
40	Du Show (聚合發獨秀)		129.7 m	34	2013	Xitun District	Residential	
41	Grand Palace (聯聚信義大廈)		127 m	29	2009	Xitun District	Residential	
42	La Bella Vita (大陸丽格)	La Bella Vita is covered with amber color windows	127 m	33	2020	Xitun District	Residential	
43	Chien Chen Ti (龍寶謙臻邸)		126.7 m	30	2016	Xitun District	Residential	
44	The Park 1 (寶輝一品花園1)		126.1 m	32	2009	Xitun District	Residential	
44=	The Park 2 (寶輝一品花園2)		126.1 m	32	2009	Xitun District	Residential	
46	T-Power (親家市政廣場)	T-power plaza is the central building	125.5 m	28	2017	Xitun District	Office	
47	Long-Bang Building (龍邦國寶)	Long-Bang National Treasure	124 m	30	1992	West District	Residential	
48	Windsor Hotel Taichung (裕元花園酒店)	Windsor Hotel is the building on the left.	124 m	26	2005	Xitun District	Hotel	
49	Grand Modesty (由鉅大謙)		123.7 m	32	2010	Xitun District	Residential	
50	Universal Industrial Headquarters (環宇實業總部大樓)		123 m	32	1990	West District	Office	
51	T3 (親家T3國際金融中心)	T-3 International Finance Center	122.8 m	29	2012	Xitun District	Office	
52	Cathay Fu-Hui Parkway 1 (府會園道1)		121.55 m	31	2015	Xitun District	Residential	
52=	Cathay Fu-Hui Parkway 2 (府會園道2)		121.55 m	31	2015	Xitun District	Residential	
54	Cathay High Rise (國泰層峰)		120.4 m	32	2019	Xitun District	Residential	
55	Pou Chen Corporation Headquarter (寶成企業總部)	Pou Chen Corporation Headquarter is the building on the right.	130 m (Top); 120 m (Architectural)	24	2005	Xitun District	Office	

== Tallest under construction or proposed ==
=== Under construction ===
This table lists all buildings under construction in Taichung that will reach 120 meters in height.

Rank	Name	District	Height (m)	Floors	Exp. completion year	Status	Notes							
Rank	Name	District	Height (m)	Floors	Exp. completion year	Status	Notes	1	Highwealth Huiguo 90 (興富發惠國段90案)	Xitun District	323.5	63	2028	Under construction
2	Kuma Tower (聯聚中維大廈)	Xitun District	208	42	2026	Under construction								
3	Alioth Palace (聯聚玉衡大廈)	Xitun District	202	51	2030	Under construction								
4	Highwealth Huiguo 88 (興富發惠國段88案)	Xitun District	170.4	33	2026	Under construction								
5	Jung Heng Palace (聯聚中衡大廈)	Xitun District	169	37	2028	Under construction								
6	Wanin International Headquarters (網銀國際總部大樓)	Xitun District	149	28	2025	Under Construction								
7	The Okura Prestige Taichung (大倉新頤飯店)	Xitun District	142.75	29	2023	Under Construction								
8	Sky Tower (寶輝Sky Tower)	Xitun District	141.05	35	2023	Under Construction								
9	Signet Tianzan (寶璽天贊)	Xitun District	138.15	36		Site Preparation								
10	CMP Midtown 1 (勤美之森1)	West District	138	35	2023	Topped Out								
11	The Columns 1 (忠泰老佛爺1)	North District	136.2	34	2023	Topped Out								
11=	The Columns 2 (忠泰老佛爺2)	North District	136.2	34	2023	Topped Out								
13	Top 1 (興富發TOP1環球經貿中心)	Xitun District	131.9	29	2023	Topped Out								
14	Fong-Yi Park One (豐邑Park One)	Xitun District	130.9	34	2027	Site Preparation								
15	Above & Beyond 1 (由鉅惟上1)	Xitun District	128.95	32	2025	Under Construction								
15=	Above & Beyond 2 (由鉅惟上2)	Xitun District	128.95	32	2025	Under Construction								
17	Twin Oaks 2925 (雙橡園2925)	Beitun District	128.95	34	2025	Under Construction								
18	Municipal Louvre 1 (市政愛悅1)	Xitun District	128.9	36	2024	Under Construction								
18=	Municipal Louvre 2 (市政愛悅2)	Xitun District	128.9	36	2024	Under Construction								
20	Twin Oaks 2279 (雙橡園2279)	Xitun District	128.6	33	2024	Under Construction								
21	Huimin 88 (興富發惠民段88)	Xitun District	128.1	37	Unknown	Under Construction								
22	Perkings Louvre (鉑金愛悅)	Xitun District	126	37	2024	Under Construction								
23	Kingdom unparalleled 1 (國雄無双1)	Xitun District	124.2	34		Site Preparation								
23=	Kingdom unparalleled 2 (國雄無双2)	Xitun District	124.2	34		Site Preparation								
25	Huimin 114 & 116 (興富發蘿曼蘿蘭)	Xitun District	123.6	34	2026	Under Construction								
26	Wenxin Louvre (文心愛悅)	Xitun District	122.5	31	2024	Under Construction								
27	Beyond the World 1 (富宇超越360 A棟)	Fengyuan District	122.35	28		Site Preparation								
27=	Beyond the World 2 (富宇超越360 B棟)	Fengyuan District	122.35	28		Site Preparation								
27=	Beyond the World 3 (富宇超越360 C棟)	Fengyuan District	122.35	28		Site Preparation								
30	Hui Hsung 119 (興富發市政新銳)	Xitun District	120.3	35	2026	Under Construction								

=== Proposed ===
This table lists all proposed buildings in Taichung that are planned to reach 120 meters in height.

Rank	Name	District	Height (m)	Floors	Exp. completion year	Status	Notes
1	Intelligence Operation Center (臺中智慧營運中心)	Xitun District	262	42		Proposed	
2	Fong Yi Huiguo 174 (豐邑惠國段174)	Xitun District	251(Estimated)	53		Proposed	
3	Alioth 1 (聯聚玉衡大廈 1)	Xitun District	201(Estimated)	51		Proposed	
3=	Alioth 2 (聯聚玉衡大廈 2)	Xitun District	201(Estimated)	51		Proposed	
5	Fong-Yi Huimin 1 (豐邑惠民段119 1)	Xitun District	193.3	50		Proposed	
6	Taiwan Summit Tower (允將TST台灣之鑽)	Xitun District	182.55	40		Under construction	
7	Fong-Yi Huimin 2 (豐邑惠民段119 2)	Xitun District	179.3	46		Proposed	
8	Landmark Plaza Taichung (國泰置地廣場台中)	Xitun District	175.2(Estimated)	34		Under construction	
9	Now & Forever (由鉅惠國段147)	Xitun District	170.6	43		Approved	
10	Taichung MRT G9-1 Station Building (捷運G9-1聯開大樓)	Xitun District	168.4	37		Proposed	
11	Sweeten Huihuo 80 (順天惠國段80)	Xitun District	162.6	40		Approved	
12	Pao Hui Huihuo 148 (寶輝惠國段148)	Xitun District	160.4	41		Proposed	
13	HuiHsung 11 (興富發惠順11)	Xitun District	137.3 (Estimated)	27		Proposed	
14	Huimin 90 (興富發惠民90)	Xitun District	128.95	36		Approved	

== Timeline of tallest buildings ==
Name	Image	Period	Height m (ft)	Floors	District
Universal Industrial Headquarters (環宇實業總部大樓)		1990-1991	123	32	West District
Long-Bang Trade Plaza (龍邦世貿大樓)		1991-1993	143	37	West District
Daan King Building (大安國王大樓)		1993-1998	149.5	42	South District
Le Meridien Taichung (臺中李方艾美酒店)		1998-2003	178	27	Central District
Shr-Hwa International Tower (世華國際大樓)		2003-2018	192	47	West District
The Landmark (Taichung) (聯聚中雍大廈)		2018-2023	192	39	Xitun District
Taichung Commercial Bank Headquarters (臺中之鑽)		2023-	225	38	Xitun District

== See also ==
- Skyscraper
- List of tallest buildings
- List of tallest buildings in Taiwan
- List of tallest buildings in New Taipei City
- List of tallest buildings in Taipei
- List of tallest buildings in Kaohsiung
