= Windsor Hotel Taichung =

Hotel in Xitun, Taichung, Taiwan

Windsor Hotel Taichung 裕元花園酒店
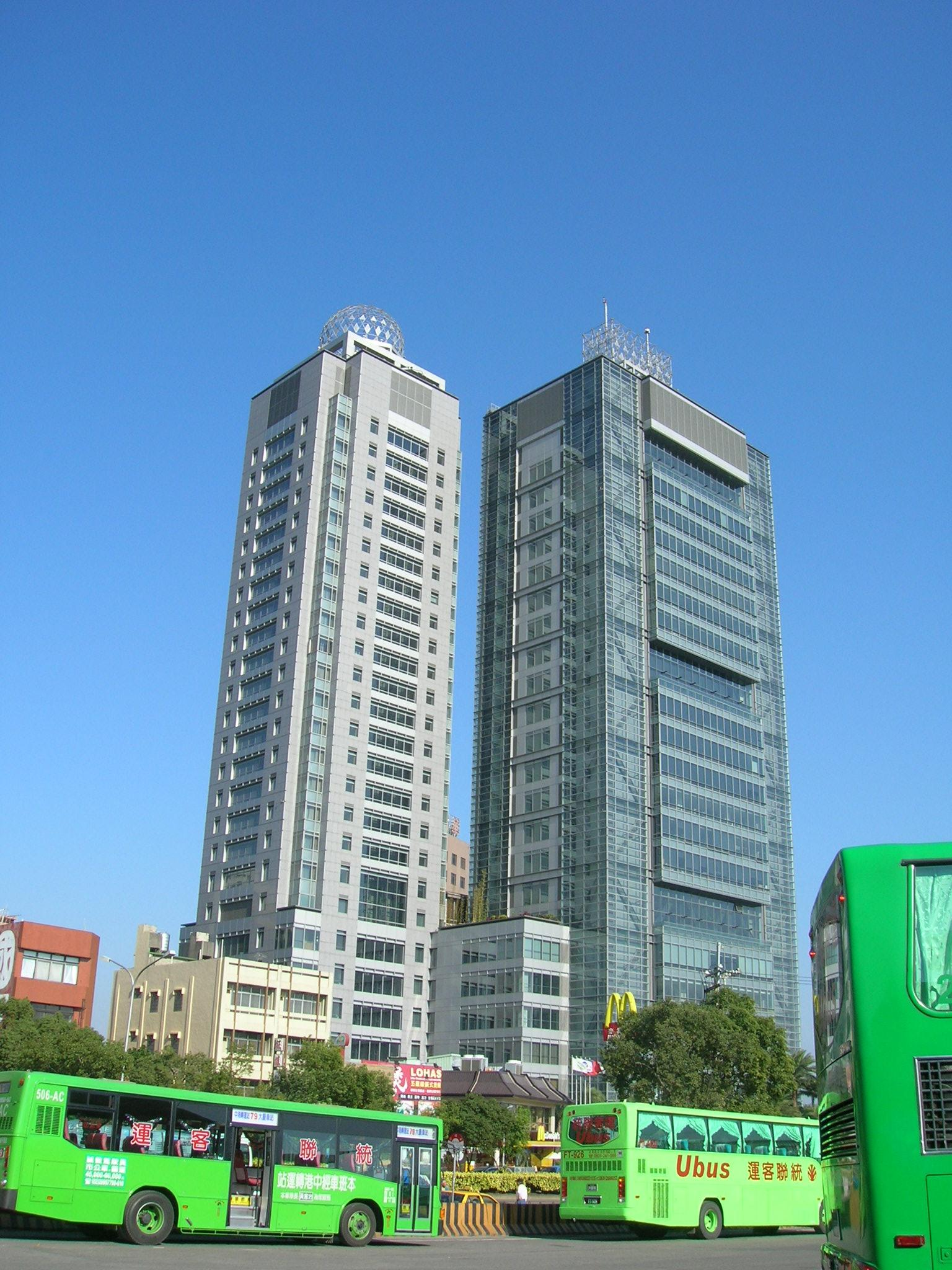
- Interactive map of the Windsor Hotel Taichung 裕元花園酒店 area

General information
- Type: hotel, office
- Location: No. 610, Section 4, Taiwan Boulevard, Xitun District, Taichung, Taiwan
- Coordinates: 24.179800260165642°N 120.62395605440662°E
- Completed: 2005

Height
- Architectural: Tower A: 123 m (404 ft); Tower B: 120 m (390 ft)

Technical details
- Floor count: Tower A: 26; Tower B: 23

The Windsor Hotel Taichung (Chinese: 裕元花園酒店) is a set of twin skyscrapers, completed in 2005, in Xitun District, Taichung, Taiwan.

Tower 'A' reaches the height of 123 m (404 ft) and consists of 26 floors above ground. Tower 'A' houses the Windsor Hotel.

Tower 'B' reaches a height of 120 m (390 ft), and consists of 23 floors above ground. Tower 'B' houses the corporate headquarters of Pou Chen Corporation.

== The Hotel ==
The Windsor Hotel has a total of 149 rooms, themed restaurants and a café.

=== Restaurants ===
- Windsor Café Buffet: Buffet offering signature dishes from around the world.
- Zhe Abalone Chinese Restaurant: Chinese restaurant featuring traditional Cantonese cuisine and Dim Sum.
- Rose Corner Bakery: Bakery offering pastries and beverages.
- Gen Zen Japanese Restaurant/Teppanyaki: Restaurant offering Japanese-style teppanyaki.

== Gallery ==
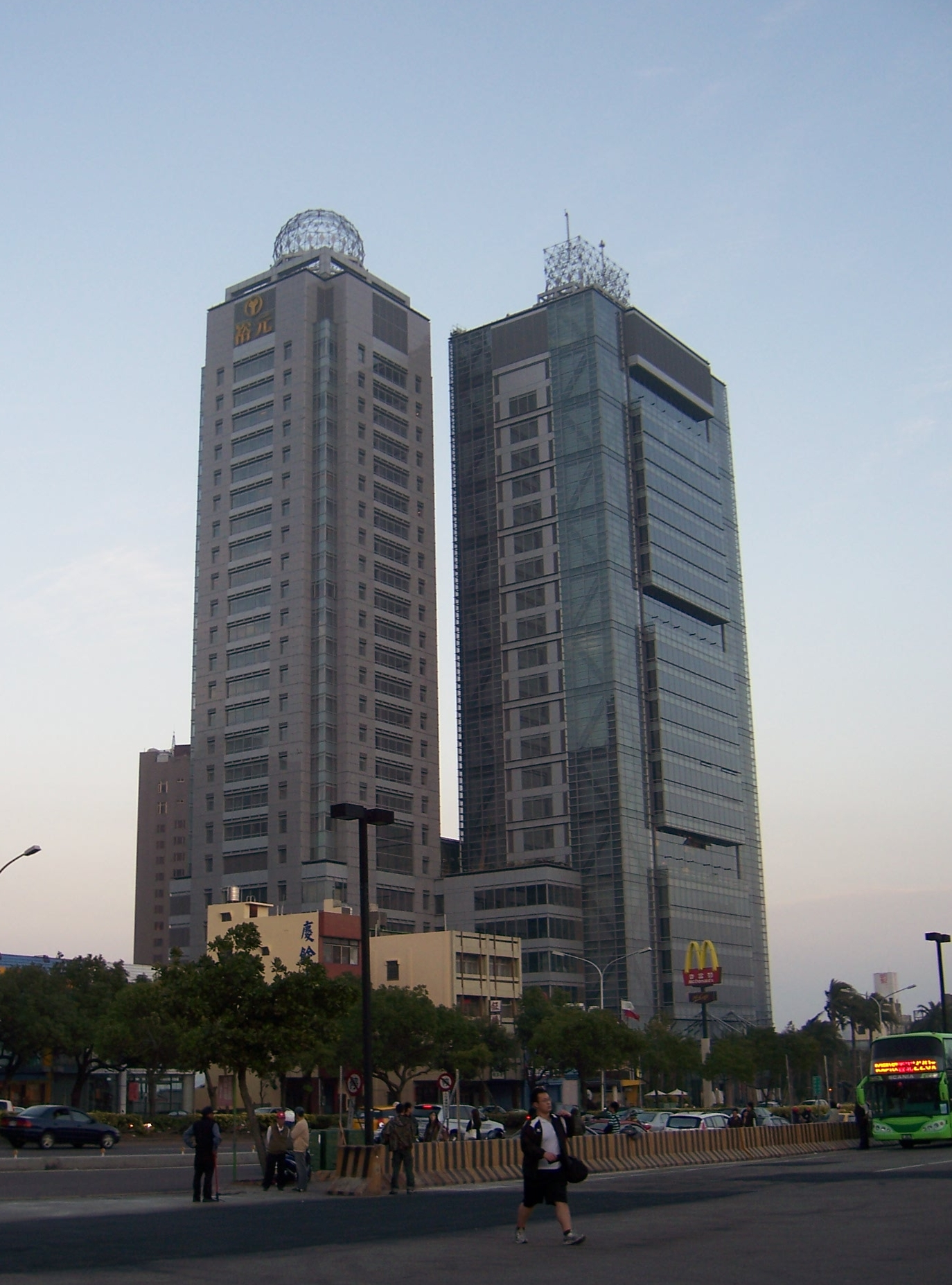

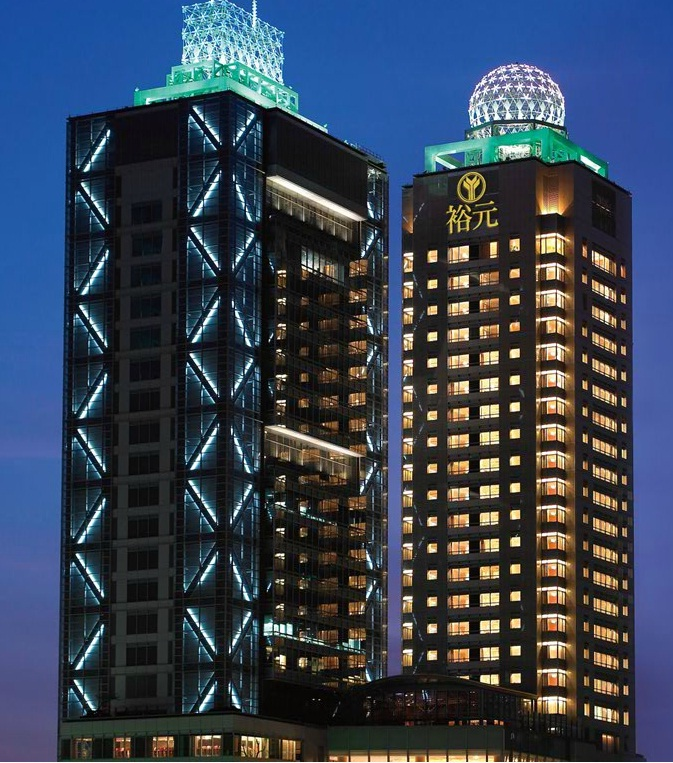
Windsor Hotel Taichung at night

== See also ==
- Le Meridien Taichung
- National Hotel (Taiwan)
- Millennium Vee Hotel Taichung
- The Splendor Hotel Taichung
