= Intelligence Operation Center =

Proposed skyscraper in Xitun, Taichung, Taiwan

Intelligence Operation Center 智慧營運中心
- Interactive map of the Intelligence Operation Center 智慧營運中心 area

General information
- Status: Under construction
- Type: office
- Architectural style: Modern
- Location: Xitun District, Taichung, Taiwan, Taichung, Taiwan
- Coordinates: 24.181277864406454°N 120.65660999755018°E
- Construction started: 2019
- Completed: 2026

Height
- Roof: 262 m (860 ft)

Technical details
- Floor count: 46

Design and construction
- Architect: Christian de Portzamparc
- Architecture firm: Ricky Liu & Associates

The Intelligence Operation Center (Chinese: 智慧營運中心; pinyin: Zhìhuì yíngyùn zhōngxīn) is a proposed skyscraper in Taichung's 7th Redevelopment Zone, Xitun District, Taichung, Taiwan. Designed by the Taiwanese architectural firm Ricky Liu & Associates partnered with French architect Christian de Portzamparc, the building will rise 262 m (860 ft) and will comprise 46 floors above ground.

The building was U/C in 2021 and was originally scheduled to start construction in 2019 and will be completed in 2022. However, the development schedule has been delayed. After the building is complete, Intelligence Operation Center will surpass The Landmark (Taichung) to become the tallest skyscraper in Taichung and central Taiwan. The building will be equipped with solar panels on the south outer wall. In addition to generating solar energy, it can block light and heat and provide shade. In addition, the hollow design of the entire building allows wind to flow into the building's green energy design, representing Taichung's future direction towards a sustainable city.

== See also ==
- List of tallest buildings in Taichung
- List of tallest buildings in Taiwan
- Taiwan Tower
