= Long-Bang Trade Plaza =

Skyscraper office building in West District, Taichung, Taiwan

Long-Bang Trade Plaza 龍邦世貿大樓
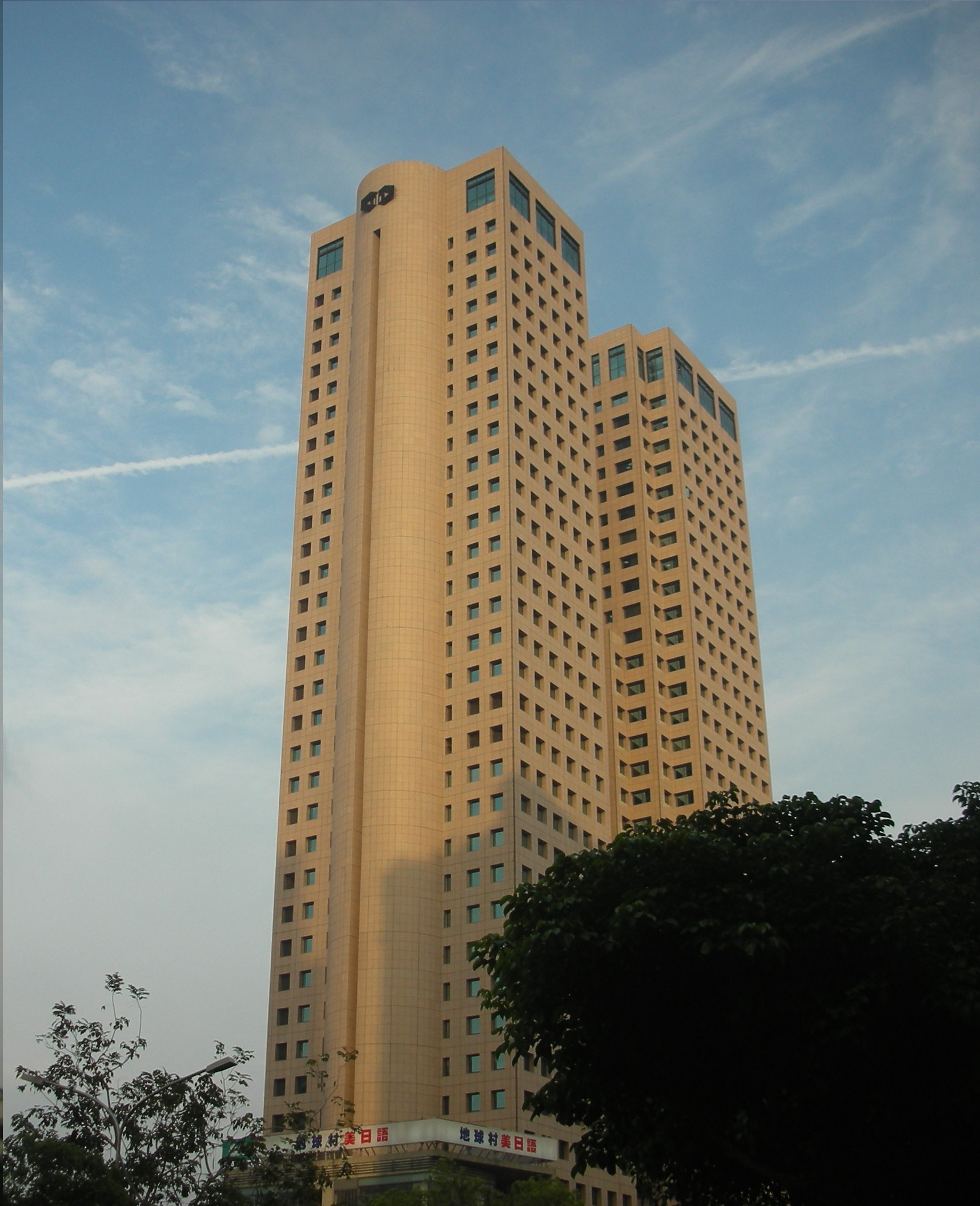
- Interactive map of the Long-Bang Trade Plaza 龍邦世貿大樓 area

General information
- Status: Completed
- Type: Office
- Location: No. 218, Section 2, Taiwan Boulevard, West District, Taichung, Taiwan
- Coordinates: 24°09′08″N 120°40′08″E
- Completed: 1993

Height
- Architectural: 160 metres (520 ft)

Technical details
- Floor count: 37
- Floor area: 70,389 m^{2} (757,660 sq ft)

Design and construction
- Architects: TMA Architects and Associates

The Long-Bang Trade Plaza, also Long-Ban World Trade Building or Long-Bong Trade Plaza (Chinese: 龍邦世貿大樓; pinyin: Lóng bāng shìmào dàlóu), is a complex of twin skyscraper office buildings located in West District, Taichung, Taiwan. The buildings were completed in 1991 and were one of the earliest skyscrapers built in Taichung, as well as the first buildings to reach 150 m (490 ft) in the city. The height of each building is 160 m (520 ft), the total floor area is 70,389 m^{2} (757,660 sq ft), and each building comprises 37 floors above ground, as well as five basement levels. The complex was designed by TMA Architects and Associates. As of December 2020, the buildings are the 11th tallest buildings in Taichung.

== See also ==
- List of tallest buildings in Taiwan
- List of tallest buildings in Taichung
- Ling-Ding Tower
