= Grand Forever =

Residential skyscraper in West District of Taichung, Taiwan

Grand Forever 由鉅大恆
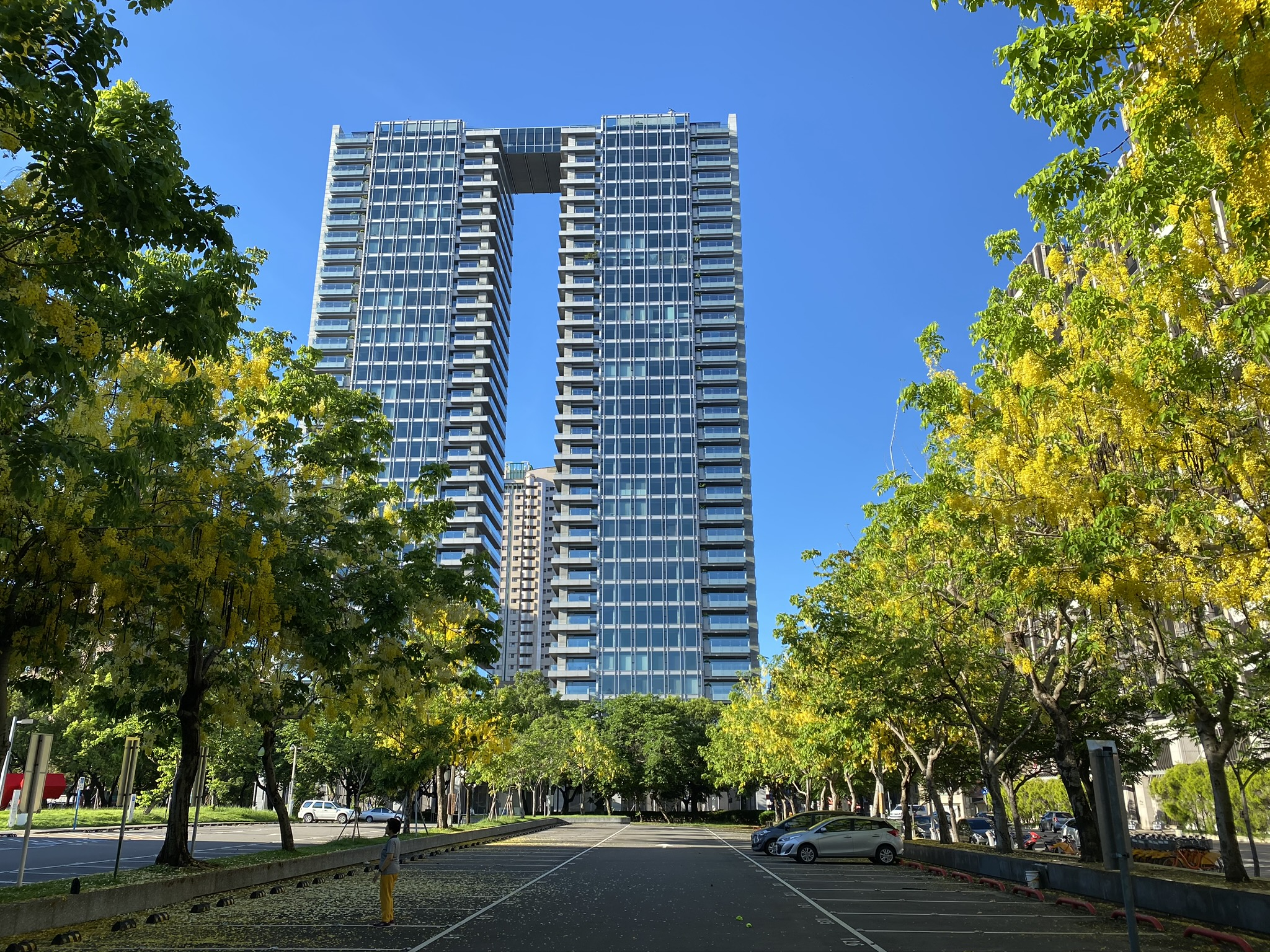
- Interactive map of the Grand Forever 由鉅大恆 area

General information
- Status: Completed
- Type: Residential
- Location: No. 101, Section 1, Wuquan West Road, West District, Taichung, Taiwan
- Coordinates: 24.13998799631126°N 120.66200212637571°E
- Completed: 2016

Height
- Architectural: 135 m (443 ft)

Technical details
- Floor count: 35
- Floor area: 56,083 m^{2} (603,670 sq ft)

The Grand Forever (Chinese: 由鉅大恆) is a complex of twin residential skyscrapers located in West District, Taichung, Taiwan. The height of the buildings are 135 m (443 ft), with a total floor area of 56,083 m^{2} (603,670 sq ft), comprising 35 floors above ground, as well as five basement levels. The buildings were completed in 2016. As of January 2021, it is 30th tallest building in Taichung. The building was constructed under strict requirements of preventing damage caused by earthquakes and typhoons common in Taiwan.

== See also ==
- List of tallest buildings in Taiwan
- List of tallest buildings in Taichung
- Fubon Sky Tree
