= Cosmos (skyscraper) =

Residential skyscraper in Xitun District of Taichung, Taiwan

Cosmos 寶璽天睿
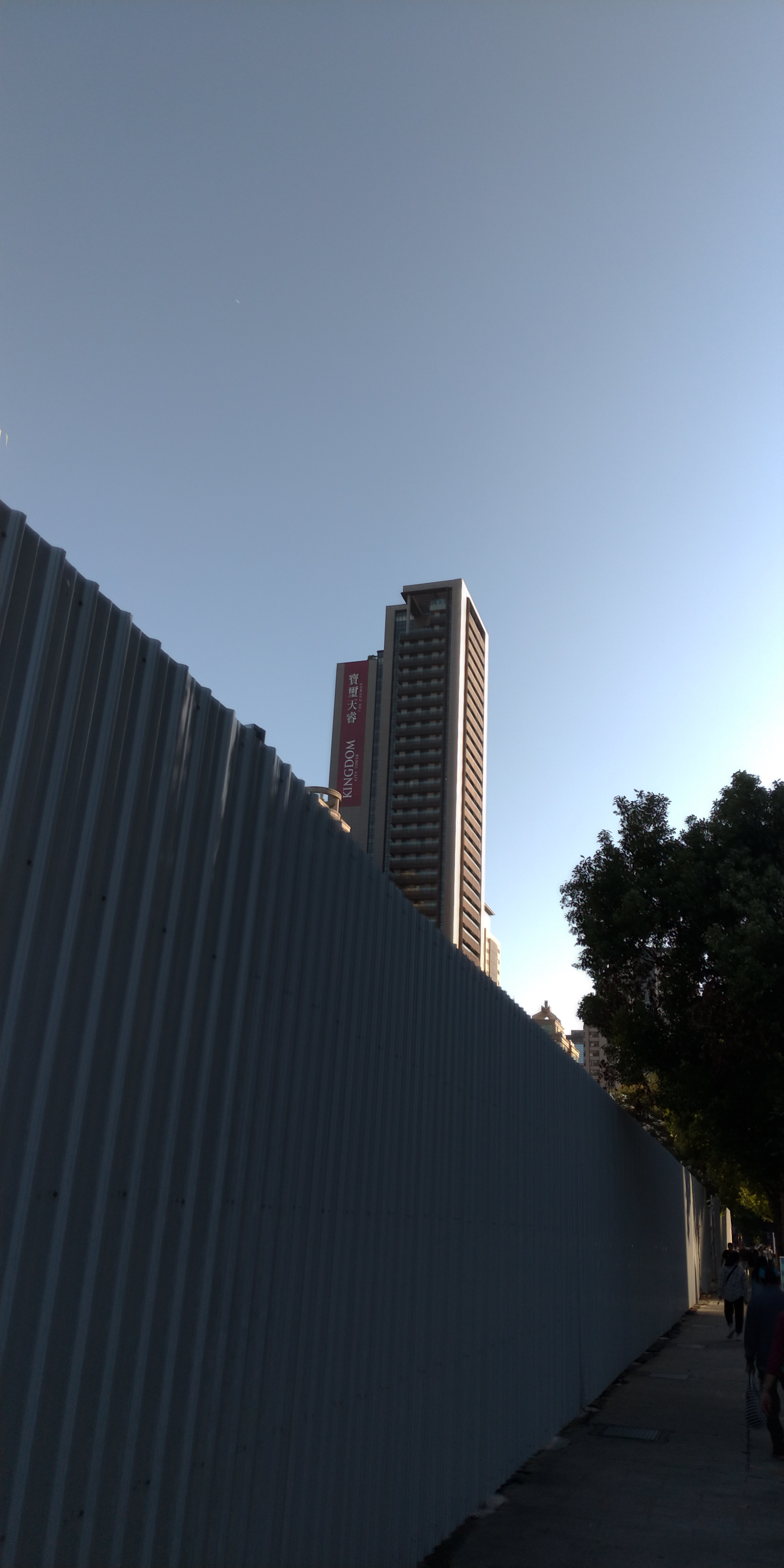
- Interactive map of the Cosmos 寶璽天睿 area

General information
- Status: Completed
- Type: Residential
- Location: No. 1, Fuhui Parkway, Xitun District, Taichung, Taiwan
- Coordinates: 24.159740427856484°N 120.64448189755°E
- Construction started: 2012
- Completed: 2018

Height
- Architectural: 149.65 m (491.0 ft)

Technical details
- Floor count: 38
- Floor area: 39,957 m^{2} (430,090 sq ft)

The Cosmos (Chinese: 寶璽天睿; pinyin: Bǎo xǐ tiān ruì) is a residential skyscraper located in Taichung's 7th Redevelopment Zone, Xitun District, Taichung, Taiwan. Construction of the building began in 2012 and it was completed in 2018. The height of the building is 149.65 m (491.0 ft), with a floor area of 39,957 m^{2} (430,090 sq ft), and it comprises 38 floors above ground, as well as four basement levels. As of January 2021, it is the 22nd tallest building in Taichung.

== Design ==
Cosmos took 6 years from land development to completion. The whole project was jointly constructed by the architect Masatoshi Katayama, Canadian architect Michael Green, and the KYDO design team. In the planning of the public space, the project deployed many luxurious installations, such as the 10.6 m (35 ft)-tall hall on the ceiling of which hangs the only ARS Murano glass chandelier in Asia, of which the market price is about 400,000 euros. It is carefully composed of 120 handmade glass, which won the 2019 European Design Award.

== See also ==
- List of tallest buildings in Taiwan
- List of tallest buildings in Taichung
- Taichung's 7th Redevelopment Zone
