= Four Seasons (skyscraper) =

Residential skyscraper in Xitun, Taichung, Taiwan

Four Seasons 四季天韻
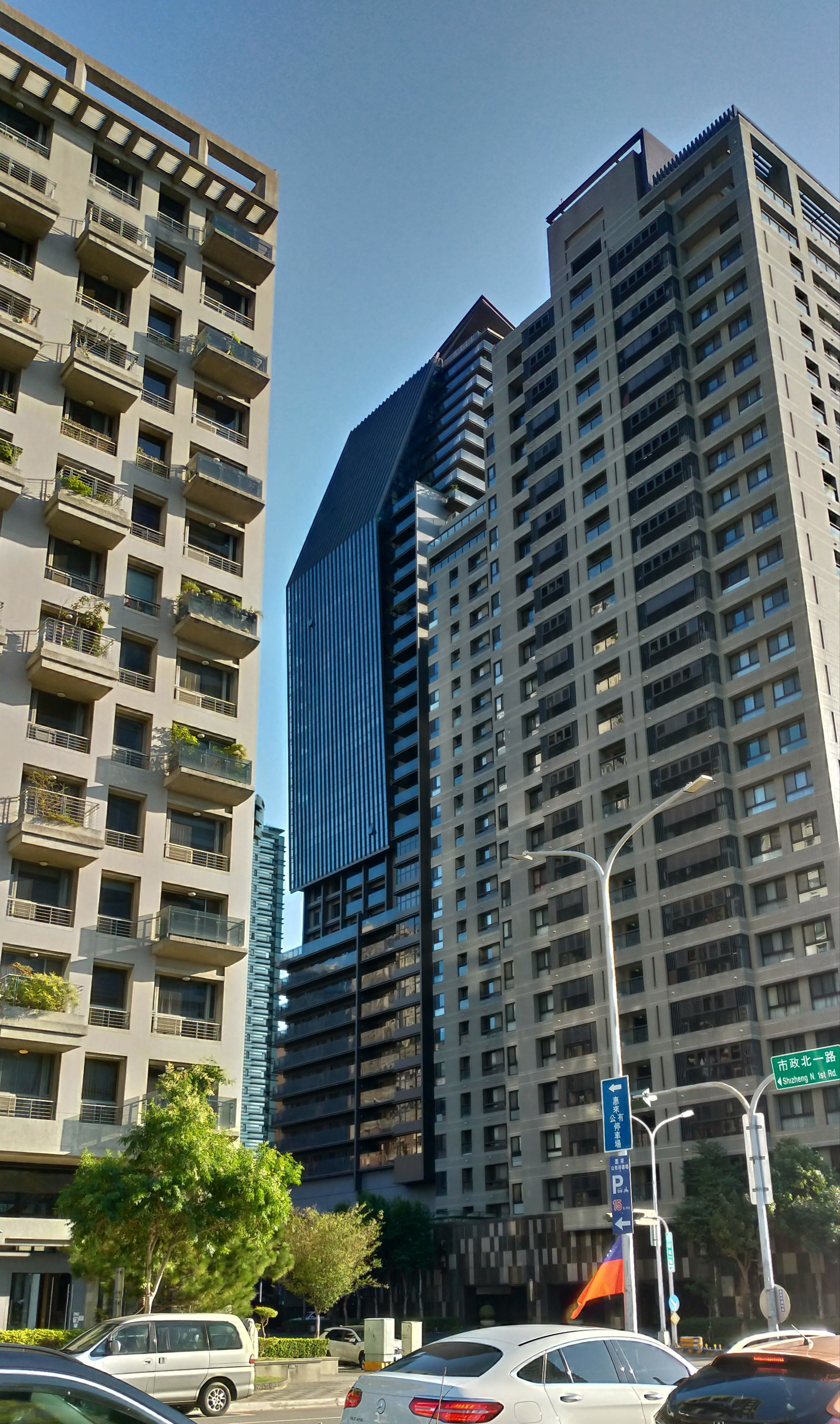
- Building in the middle
- Interactive map of the Four Seasons 四季天韻 area

General information
- Status: Completed
- Type: Residential
- Location: No. 351, Shizheng North 1st Road, Xitun District, Taichung, Taiwan
- Coordinates: 24.161155223355316°N 120.63778308983298°E
- Completed: 2009

Height
- Architectural: 138 m (453 ft)

Technical details
- Floor count: 35

Design and construction
- Architects: Hsuyuan Kuo Architect & Associates

The Four Seasons (Chinese: 四季天韻) is a 35-story, 138 m (453 ft) residential skyscraper completed in 2009 and located in Xitun District, Taichung, Taiwan. As of February 2021, it is 28th tallest building in Taichung. Designed by the Taiwanese architectural firm Hsuyuan Kuo Architect & Associates, the building was constructed under strict requirements of preventing damage caused by earthquakes and typhoons common in Taiwan.

== See also ==
- List of tallest buildings in Taiwan
- List of tallest buildings in Taichung
