= Chuhofa Sky Building =

Residential skyscraper in Taichung, Taiwan

Chuhofa Sky Building 聚合發天廈
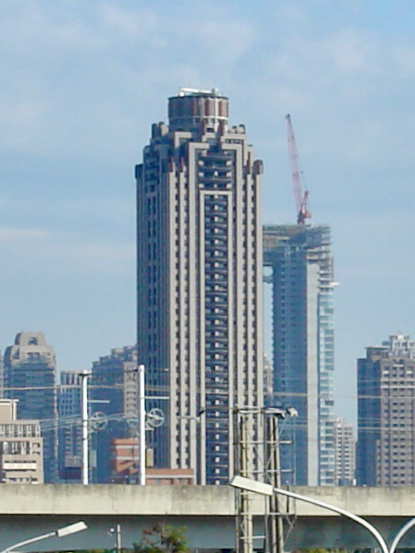
- Interactive map of the Chuhofa Sky Building 聚合發天廈 area

General information
- Status: Completed
- Type: Residential
- Location: No. 69, Section 3, Huanzhong Road, Xitun District, Taichung, Taiwan
- Coordinates: 24°10′29.2″N 120°38′0.26″E
- Construction started: 2011
- Completed: 2016; 10 years ago

Height
- Architectural: 144.7 m (475 ft)

Technical details
- Floor count: 38

Chuhofa Sky Building (Chinese: 聚合發天廈) is a 38-story, 144.7 m (475 ft) residential skyscraper completed in 2016 and located in Taichung's 7th Redevelopment Zone, Xitun District, Taichung, Taiwan. As of February 2021, it is 23rd tallest building in Taichung. The building was constructed under strict requirements of preventing damage caused by earthquakes and typhoons common in Taiwan.

== See also ==
- List of tallest buildings in Taiwan
- List of tallest buildings in Taichung
- Taichung's 7th Redevelopment Zone
