= Highwealth Huiguo 90 =

Skyscraper office building in Xitun, Taichung, Taiwan

Highwealth Huiguo 90 興富發惠國段90案
- An artist's rendition
- Interactive map of the Highwealth Huiguo 90 興富發惠國段90案 area

General information
- Status: Under construction
- Type: Office
- Location: Taichung's 7th Redevelopment Zone, Xitun District, Taichung, Taiwan
- Coordinates: 24.1641917°N 120.6451763°E
- Construction started: 9 May 2024
- Completed: 2028

Height
- Architectural: 323.5 m (1,061 ft)

Technical details
- Floor count: 63 above ground 8 below ground
- Floor area: 160,133.97 m^{2} (1,723,667.7 sq ft)

Design and construction
- Architect: Aedas

Highwealth Huiguo 90, officially known as Taichung Xitun District Sec.Huiguo Plot 90 Retail & Office Project (Chinese: 臺中市西屯區惠國段90地號商業及辦公大樓設計項目), is an under-construction, 323.5 m (1,061 ft), 63-storey skyscraper office building that is located next to Top City Shopping Mall in Taichung's 7th Redevelopment Zone, Xitun District, Taichung, Taiwan. Designed by the architectural firm Aedas, the ground breaking ceremony of the building was held on 9 May 2024. Initially, the building was planned to be only 270 m (890 ft) in height, but was later changed to its current height in 2023.

The building will surpass Taichung Commercial Bank Headquarters to become the tallest building in Taichung and the fourth tallest in Taiwan upon its estimated completion in 2028.

== See also ==
- List of tallest buildings in Taiwan
- List of tallest buildings in Taichung
- Taichung's 7th Redevelopment Zone
