= Wanin International Headquarters =

Skyscraper office building in Xitun, Taichung, Taiwan

Wanin International Headquarters 網銀國際總部
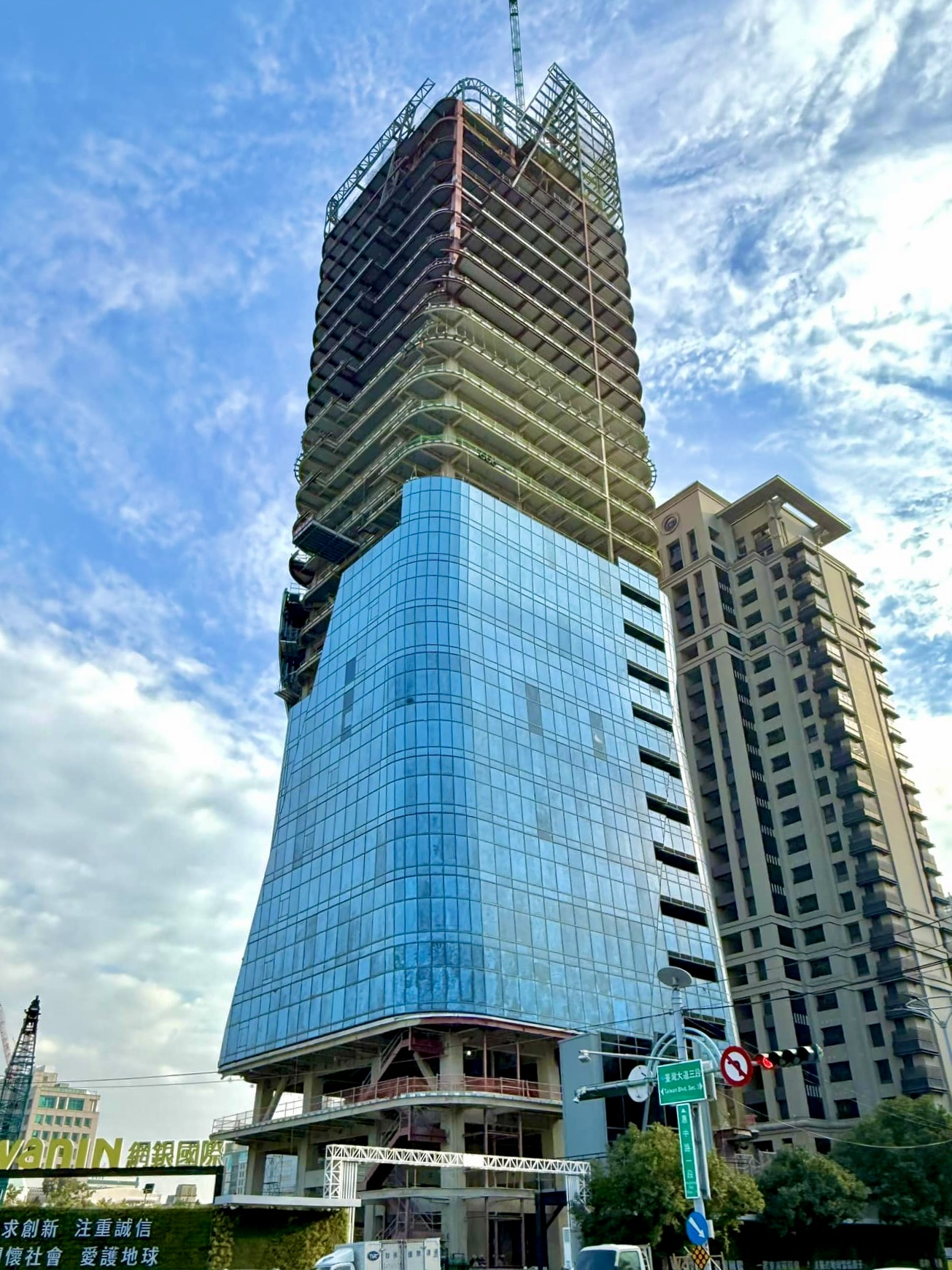
- Interactive map of the Wanin International Headquarters 網銀國際總部 area

General information
- Status: Under construction
- Type: Office
- Location: No.49, Section 1, Huizhong Road, Xitun District, Taichung, Taiwan
- Coordinates: 24°10′3″N 120°38′53″E
- Construction started: 2022

Height
- Architectural: 150.5 m (494 ft)

Technical details
- Floor count: 28 above ground 7 below fround
- Floor area: 43,087 m^{2} (463,780 sq ft)

Wanin International Headquarters (Chinese: 網銀國際總部; pinyin: Wǎngyín guójì zǒngbù), is an under-construction, 150.5 m (494 ft), 28-storey skyscraper office building located in Xitun District, Taichung, Taiwan. Construction of the building began in June 2022. Upon its estimated completion date in 2025, the building will serve as the new headquarters for Wanin International, a Taiwanese video game developer based in Taichung. As of late 2025, completion of the project is now expected for October 2026.

The design for the building has been nominated for a Better Future World Design award.

== See also ==
- List of tallest buildings in Taiwan
- List of tallest buildings in Taichung
