= Pao Huei Solitaire =

Residential skyscraper in Xitun District of Taichung, Taiwan

Pao Huei Solitaire 寶輝秋紅谷
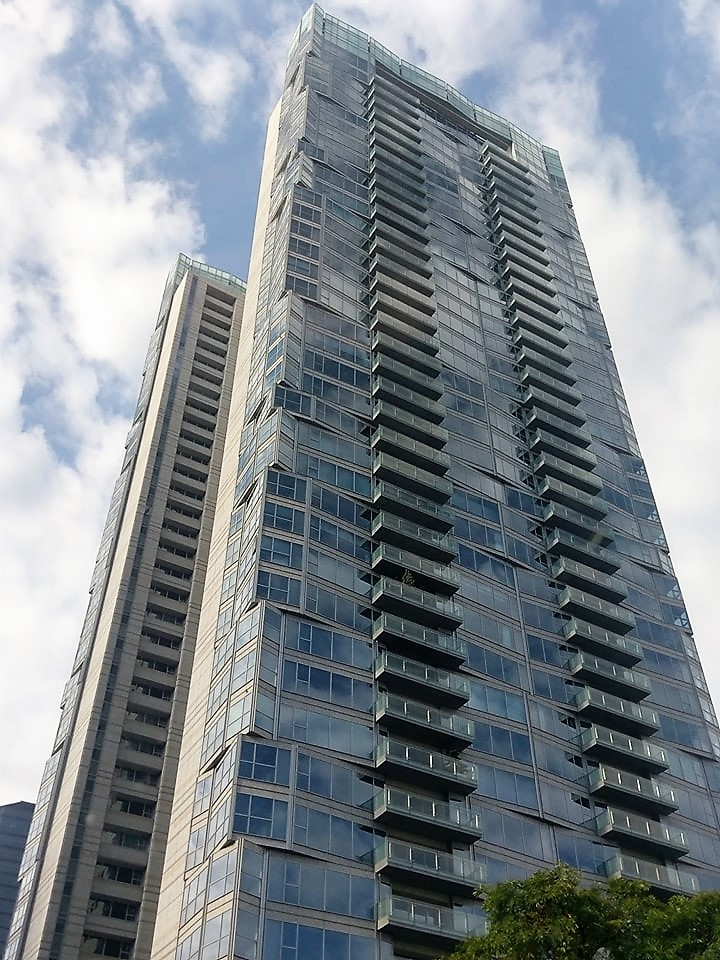
- Interactive map of the Pao Huei Solitaire 寶輝秋紅谷 area

General information
- Status: Completed
- Type: Residential
- Location: Xitun District, Taichung, Taiwan
- Coordinates: 24°09′56″N 120°38′20″E
- Construction started: 2012
- Completed: 2016

Height
- Architectural: 161 m (528 ft)

Technical details
- Floor count: 41
- Floor area: 88,161.36 m^{2} (948,961.0 sq ft)

Design and construction
- Architect: Johnson Fain

The Pao Huei Solitaire (Chinese: 寶輝秋紅谷) is a residential skyscraper located in Xitun District, Taichung, Taiwan. As of December 2020, it is the 10th tallest building in Taichung and 30th tallest in Taiwan. The height of the building is 161 m (528 ft)}, with a floor area of 88,161.36 m^{2} (948,961.0 sq ft), and it comprises 41 floors above ground, as well as six basement levels.

== See also ==
- List of tallest buildings in Taiwan
- List of tallest buildings in Taichung
- Taichung's 7th Redevelopment Zone
