= Smith & Wollensky =

International steakhouse chain

- New York location
- Type: Private
- Industry: Restaurants
- Founded: 1977; 49 years ago
- Headquarters: Boston
- Number of locations: 9
- Parent: The Smith & Wollensky Restaurant Group, Inc.
- Website: smithandwollensky.com

Smith & Wollensky is the name of several high-end American and international steakhouses, with locations in New York, Boston, Chicago, Miami Beach, Las Vegas, London, Taipei, Philippines, Taichung and Seoul. The first Smith and Wollensky steakhouse was founded in 1977 by Alan Stillman, best known for creating T.G.I. Friday's, and Ben Benson, in a distinctive building on 49th Street and 3rd Avenue in New York, once occupied by Manny Wolf's Steakhouse.

Many of the restaurants have a wooden exterior with its trademark green and white colors. The individual Smith and Wollensky restaurants operate using slightly varied menus. In 1997, Ruth Reichl, then-restaurant reviewer for The New York Times, called Smith & Wollensky "A steakhouse to end all arguments." Smith & Wollensky is owned by PPX Hospitality Brands and Danu Partners, with the exception of the NYC location.

== Name ==
According to Stillman, neither a Mr. Smith nor a Mr. Wollensky was involved. He opened the Manhattan phone book twice and randomly pulled out two names, "Smith" and "Wollensky." The announcements for the opening, carried the names "Charlie Smith" and "Ralph Wollensky." Stillman later admitted that "Charlie" and "Ralph" were the names of his dogs.

== Locations ==
=== New York ===
Located in midtown Manhattan, the first S&W steakhouse occupies a stand-alone building whose wooden exterior bears the trademark green and white colors. This decor was inherited from Manny Wolf's Chop House, which operated between 1897 and 1977. When it became Smith & Wollensky, they simply changed the sign to "Since 1977" but otherwise kept the type of lettering used on the outside of Manny Wolf's the same. Wollensky's Grill is a bar room within the restaurant with a more bar-type atmosphere and food, and is open later than the dining room.

The New York location was used for a scene as a meeting place for Christian Bale and Willem Dafoe's characters in the 2000 film American Psycho. It and its kitchen featured in the 2006 film The Devil Wears Prada. It was also used for the famous 2008 $2.11 million and 2007 $650,100 "Power Lunch with Warren Buffett" charity auction on eBay, with Zhao Danyang and Mohnish Pabrai & Guy Spier, respectively.

When Mr. Stillman sold the Smith & Wollensky Restaurant Group, he retained ownership of the New York restaurant, although all locations share promotional and marketing efforts.

=== Chicago ===
Bearing the same green and white painted exterior as the New York location, this steakhouse overlooks the Chicago River and the Loop. It played a role in the revival of Chicago's River North area and is neighbored by Marina City and the House of Blues. This location was featured in the 2006 film The Break-Up.

=== Miami Beach ===
In a two-story building on the waterfront, S&W's Miami is technically located at the extreme southern end of Miami Beach and offers views of the Miami skyline and ships passing through Government Cut into and out of the port of Miami. It takes advantage of its waterfront location, with an outdoor patio for diners to enjoy the outdoors.

=== Las Vegas ===
The restaurant had three floors and was across from the City Center on the Las Vegas Strip.

In May 2019, the restaurant re-opened in a significantly smaller location within the Grand Canal Shoppes at The Venetian Las Vegas.

=== Massachusetts ===
Three Smith & Wollensky restaurants exist in Massachusetts, with the Boston-based restaurant located on the Fort Point Channel near South Station, a second restaurant in Wellesley, and a third restaurant in Burlington, which opened in 2023.

The original Boston restaurant closed in May 2018. This location formerly occupied the Armory of the First Corps of Cadets, a castle built in 1891 originally intended as a military building. It was the only Smith & Wollensky location on the National Register of Historic Places.

=== London ===
This location opened in June 2015 as the brand's first restaurant outside the US. It is located in the landmark Adelphi Building off the Strand.

=== Taipei ===
The brand's first restaurant in Asia opened in Taipei in 2019. The restaurant is located on the 47th floor of the Taipei Nan Shan Plaza skyscraper.

=== Taichung ===
The brand's second restaurant in Taiwan opened in June 2024 in Taichung. The restaurant is located on the 34th floor of the Taichung Time Square CBD building in Taichung's 7th Redevelopment Zone.

=== Seoul ===
Now open in Hannam-dong, an upscale residential and cultural hub of Seoul. This location has the largest bespoke dry- aging facility in Korea.

=== Tokyo ===
Located in Ginza, this location opened in May 2026.

== Brand ==
The original Smith & Wollensky location opened in 1977 in New York City. It has since become an institution known for its American hospitality and USDA Prime steaks, butchered and dry-aged on premise. The restaurant brand claims to be the only national steakhouse devoted to dry-aging and hand-carving USDA Prime steaks in-house. Together with the brand’s committed partners, America’s Steakhouse has sourced a selection of American Wagyu cuts to complement their USDA Prime steaks.

== IPO ==
In 1999, Stillman announced initial public offering (IPO) to open at least three Smith & Wollensky restaurants every year around the U.S. The IPO took place in 2001 with a price of $8.50, and raised $45 million. The stock dropped 8.6 percent on the first day. After the IPO, the company was able to expand and grow sales, but the stock was not profitable. It had been consistently below the initial offering price.

In 2007, Landry's offered an unsolicited $7.50 a share for the company, and a privately held Patina Restaurant Group offered $9.25 a share and succeeded in a buyout. In 2007, Nick Valenti, CEO of the Patina Restaurant Group and his partner Joachim Splichal, together with the Boston-based private equity firm Bunker Hill Capital, purchased The Smith & Wollensky Restaurant Group. In March of 2016, Danu Partners acquired the Smith & Wollensky Restaurant Group from Bunker Hill.

== See also ==
- List of restaurants in New York City
- List of steakhouses
