= Daan King Building =

Skyscraper office building in South District, Taichung, Taiwan

Daan King Building 大安國王大樓
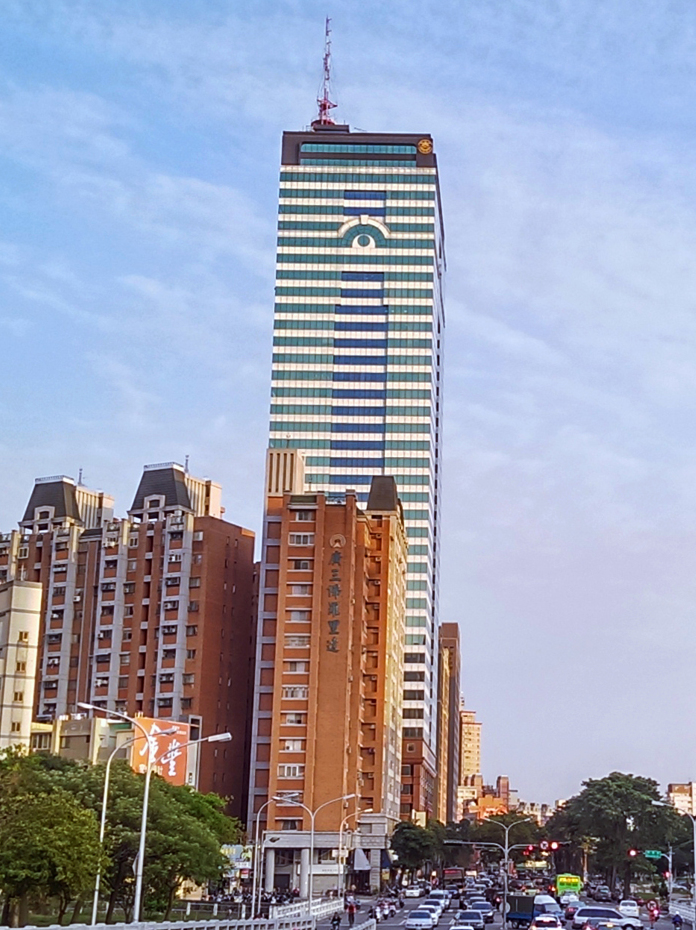
- Interactive map of the Daan King Building 大安國王大樓 area

General information
- Status: Completed
- Type: Office building
- Classification: Office
- Location: No. 787-789, Zhongming South Road, South District, Taichung, Taiwan
- Coordinates: 24°7′23.5″N 120°39′37.4″E
- Completed: 1994

Height
- Roof: 151 m (495 ft)

Technical details
- Floor count: 42
- Floor area: 56,850 m^{2} (611,900 sq ft)

Daan King Building, or Ta Ann King Building (Chinese: 大安國王大樓; pinyin: Dà'ān guówáng dàlóu), is a skyscraper office building located in South District, Taichung, Taiwan. The height of the building is 151 m (495 ft), with a floor area of 56,850 m^{2} (611,900 sq ft), and it comprises 42 floors above ground, as well as four basement levels. The building was completed in 1994 and was one of the earliest skyscrapers in Taichung as well as the first building to reach more than 40 floors in the city. Daan King Building and Daan International Building located on the opposite side of the road are commonly known as Taichung Twin Towers, as the two buildings have almost the same appearance, however their completion dates are different by three years. As of January 2021, it is the 20th tallest building in Taichung.

== See also ==
- List of tallest buildings in Taiwan
- List of tallest buildings in Taichung
