= Global Strategy Center =

Skyscraper in Xitun, Taichung, Taiwan

Global Strategy Center 豐邑A8市政核心
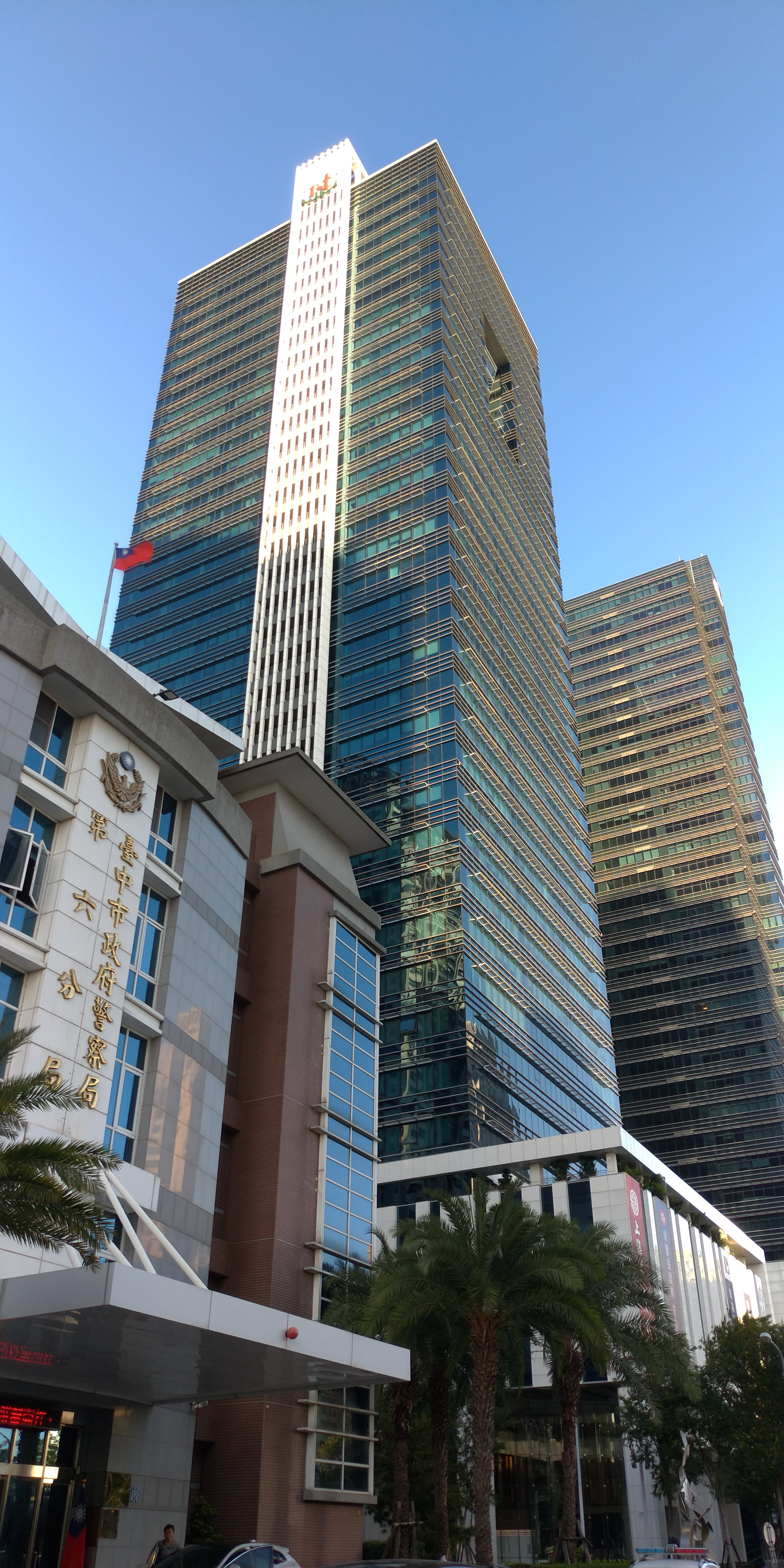
- Interactive map of the Global Strategy Center 豐邑A8市政核心 area

General information
- Status: Completed
- Type: Office
- Location: Xitun, Taichung, Taiwan
- Coordinates: 24°09′33″N 120°38′22″E
- Completed: 2015

Height
- Architectural: 169.5 metres (556 ft)

Technical details
- Floor count: 38
- Floor area: 74,094.71 m^{2} (797,548.8 sq ft)

The Global Strategy Center (Chinese: 豐邑A8市政核心; pinyin: Fēng yì A8 shìzhèng héxīn) is a skyscraper located in Xitun District, Taichung, Taiwan. As of December 2020, it is the 4th tallest building in Taichung and 22nd tallest in Taiwan. The height of the building is 169.5 m (556 ft), the floor area is 74,094.7 m^{2} (797,549 sq ft), and it comprises 38 floors above ground, as well as seven basement levels.

== See also ==
- List of tallest buildings in Taiwan
- List of tallest buildings in Taichung
