= Art Deco Landmark =

Residential skyscraper in Xitun, Taichung, Taiwan

Art Deco Landmark 富宇世界之匯
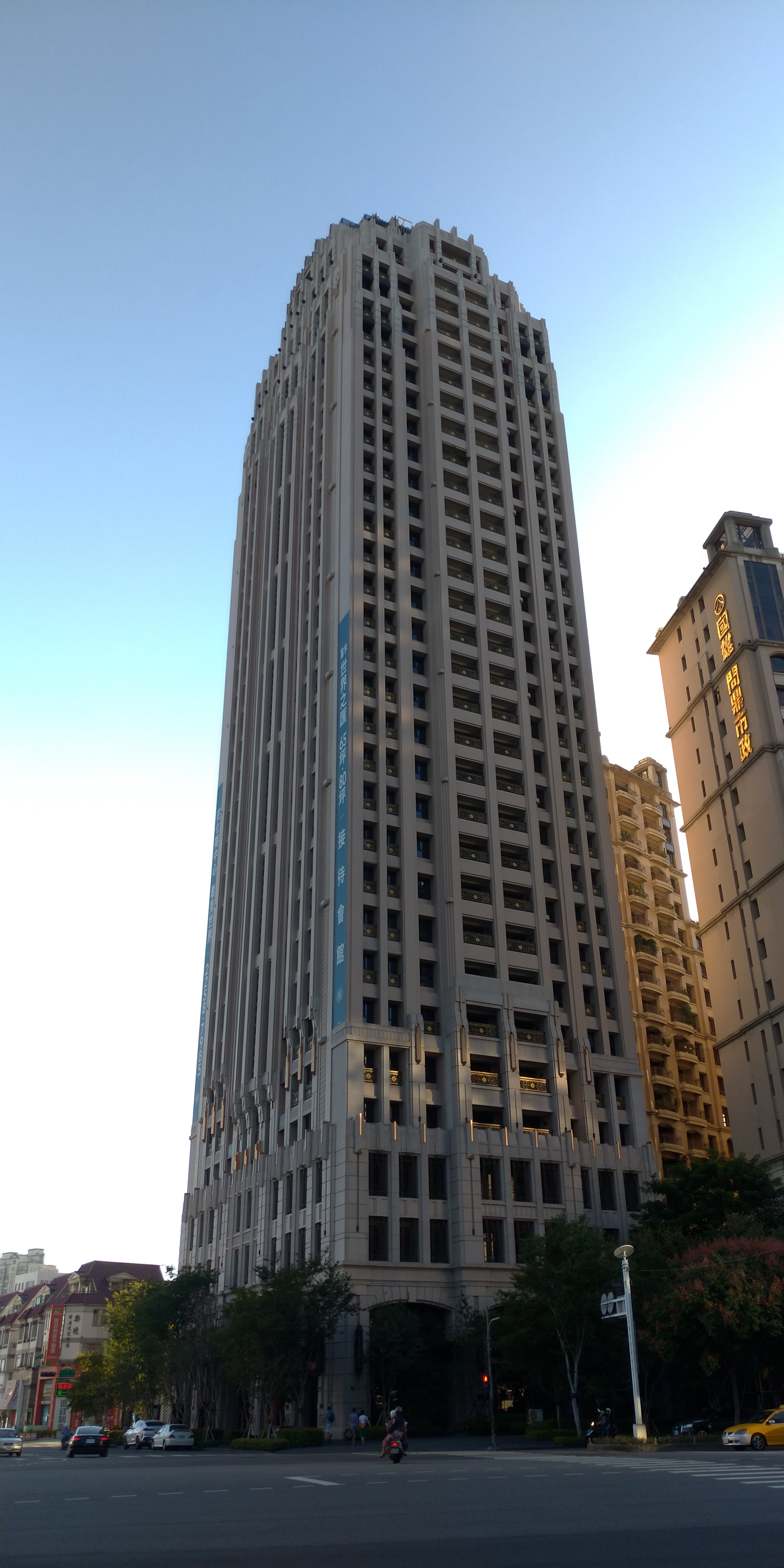
- Interactive map of the Art Deco Landmark 富宇世界之匯 area

General information
- Status: Completed
- Type: Residential
- Location: No. 137, Shizheng Road, Xitun District, Taichung, Taiwan
- Coordinates: 24.15895572625422°N 120.63859030043845°E
- Completed: 2018

Height
- Architectural: 133 m (436 ft)

Technical details
- Floor count: 32
- Floor area: 31,537 m^{2} (339,460 sq ft)

The Art Deco Landmark (Chinese: 富宇世界之匯) is a 32-story, 133 m (436 ft) residential skyscraper completed in 2018 and located in Xitun District, Taichung, Taiwan. With six basement levels, the building has a total floor area of 31,537 m^{2} (339,460 sq ft), housing 113 apartment units. As of October 2021, it is the 35th tallest building in Taichung. Designed in the Art Deco style (hence its name), the building was constructed under strict requirements of preventing damage caused by earthquakes and typhoons common in Taiwan.

== See also ==
- List of tallest buildings in Taiwan
- List of tallest buildings in Taichung
