= Fuyu Oriental Crown =

Residential skyscraper in Xitun District of Taichung, Taiwan

Fuyu Oriental Crown 富宇東方之冠
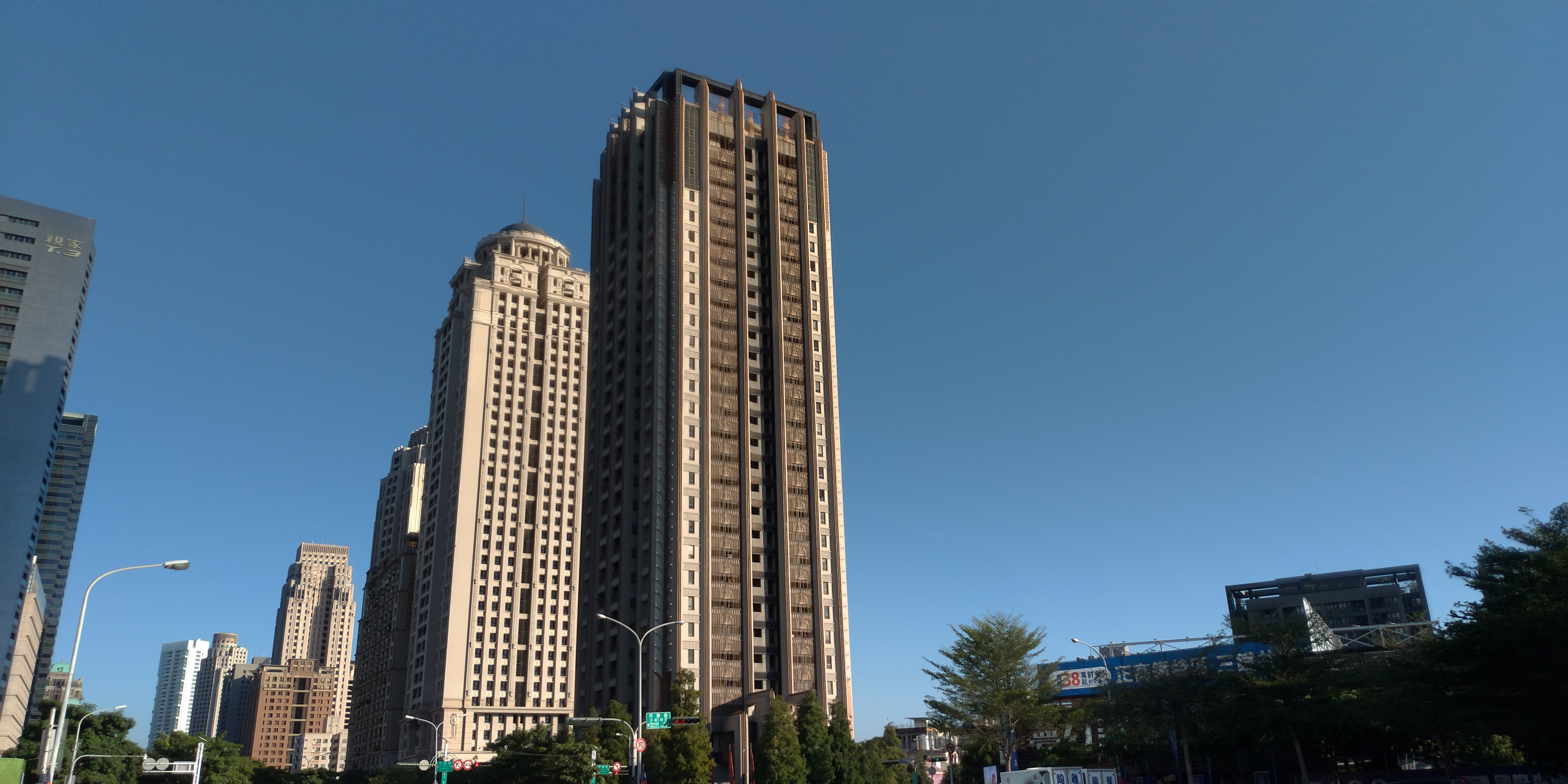
- The second building from the right
- Interactive map of the Fuyu Oriental Crown 富宇東方之冠 area

General information
- Status: Completed
- Type: Residential
- Location: Xitun District, Taichung, Taiwan
- Coordinates: 24°09′33″N 120°38′15″E
- Construction started: 2011
- Completed: 2015

Height
- Architectural: 165.2 m (542 ft)

Technical details
- Floor count: 38

The Fuyu Oriental Crown, also known as The Glory Tower (Chinese: 富宇東方之冠; pinyin: Fù yǔ dōngfāng zhī guān), is a residential skyscraper located in Xitun District, Taichung, Taiwan. As of December 2020, it is the tallest residential skyscraper in Taichung, the 7th tallest building in Taichung and 25th tallest in Taiwan. The height of the building is 165.2 m (542 ft), and it comprises 38 floors above ground, as well as five basement levels.

== See also ==
- List of tallest buildings in Taiwan
- List of tallest buildings in Taichung
- Taichung's 7th Redevelopment Zone
