= City Center Plaza =

Skyscraper in Xitun, Taichung, Taiwan

City Center Plaza 豐邑市政都心廣場
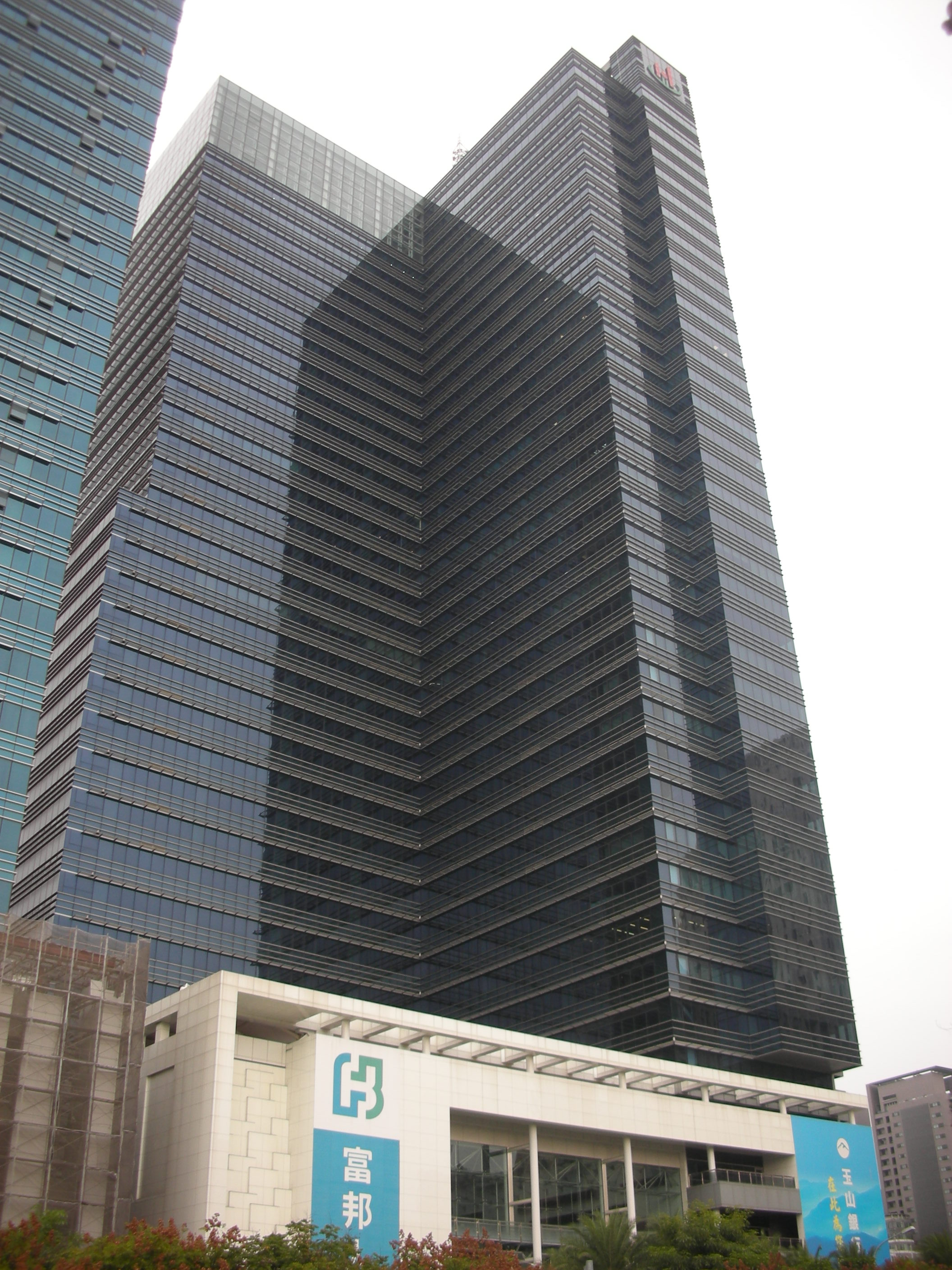
- Interactive map of the City Center Plaza 豐邑市政都心廣場 area

General information
- Status: Completed
- Type: Office
- Location: Xitun District, Taichung, Taiwan
- Coordinates: 24°09′32″N 120°38′25″E
- Completed: 2010

Height
- Architectural: 168 metres (551 ft)

Technical details
- Floor count: 38
- Floor area: 92,496.24 m^{2} (995,621.2 sq ft)

The City Center Plaza (Chinese: 豐邑市政都心廣場; pinyin: Fēng yì shìzhèng dōuxīn guǎngchǎng) is a skyscraper office building located in Taichung's 7th Redevelopment Zone, Xitun District, Taichung, Taiwan. The height of the building is 168 m (551 ft), the floor area is 92,496.24 m^{2} (995,621.2 sq ft), and it comprises 38 floors above ground, as well as six basement levels. As of December 2020, it is the 5th tallest building in Taichung and 23rd tallest in Taiwan.

== See also ==
- List of tallest buildings in Taiwan
- List of tallest buildings in Taichung
- Taichung's 7th Redevelopment Zone
