= Kuma Tower =

Building in Xitun, Taichung, Taiwan

Kuma Tower 聯聚中維大廈

General information
- Status: Under construction
- Type: office building
- Location: Shizheng North 1st Road, Xitun District, Taichung, Taiwan
- Construction started: 2023
- Estimated completion: 2026

Height
- Height: 208 m (682 ft)

Technical details
- Floor count: 42 above 7 below

Design and construction
- Architect: Kengo Kuma

Kuma Tower (Chinese: 聯聚中維大廈) is an under construction skyscraper located in Taichung's 7th Redevelopment Zone, Xitun District, Taichung, Taiwan. Upon its expected completion in 2026, it will be the second tallest building in Taichung. The architectural height of building is 208 m (682 ft), and it comprises 42 floors above ground, as well as 7 basement levels. The building is named after its designer Kengo Kuma, a Japanese architect.

== See also ==
- List of tallest buildings in Taiwan
- List of tallest buildings in Taichung
