= Taiwan Tower =

Planned building in Taichung, Taiwan

The Taiwan Tower (Chinese: 台灣塔; pinyin: Táiwān Tǎ) is a futuristic tower planned for construction in Taichung, Taiwan. It will be over 300 meters high, and have eight "Blimps" that carry people to the top of the tower.

It will resemble a tree trunk, with the blimps resembling leaves. The "leaves" will be able to carry up to 80 people at a time. Construction was initially planned to begin in 2012. Its design is supposed to be eco- friendly, using natural ventilation, and dome light for basements and museums.

== See also ==
- List of tallest buildings in Taiwan
- Intelligence Operation Center
