= Du Show =

Residential skyscraper in Xitun, Taichung, Taiwan

Du Show 聚合發獨秀
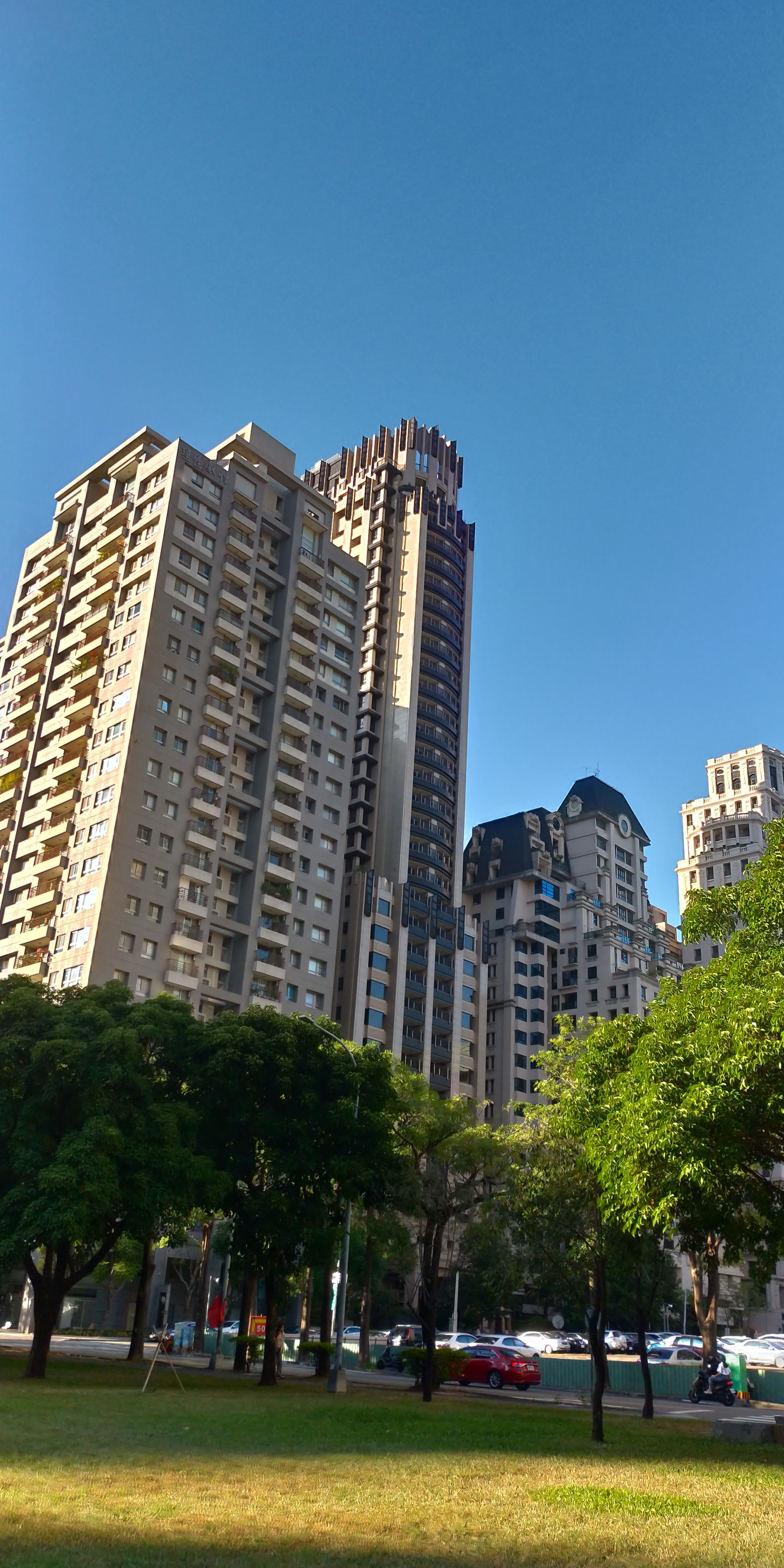
- Tallest building in the middle
- Interactive map of the Du Show 聚合發獨秀 area

General information
- Status: Completed
- Type: Residential
- Location: No. 21, Huizhong 3rd Street, Xitun District, Taichung, Taiwan
- Coordinates: 24.163321204036325°N 120.64237903219609°E
- Completed: 2013

Height
- Architectural: 130.15 m (427.0 ft)

Technical details
- Floor count: 34

The Du Show (Chinese: 聚合發獨秀) is a 34-story, 130.15 m (427.0 ft) residential skyscraper completed in 2013 and located in Taichung's 7th Redevelopment Zone, Xitun District, Taichung, Taiwan. As of March 2021, the building is the 35th tallest in Taichung. The building was constructed under strict requirements of preventing damage caused by earthquakes and typhoons common in Taiwan.

== See also ==
- List of tallest buildings in Taiwan
- List of tallest buildings in Taichung
- Taichung's 7th Redevelopment Zone
