= The Splendor Hotel Taichung =

Skyscraper hotel in West District, Taichung, Taiwan

The Splendor Hotel Taichung 台中金典酒店
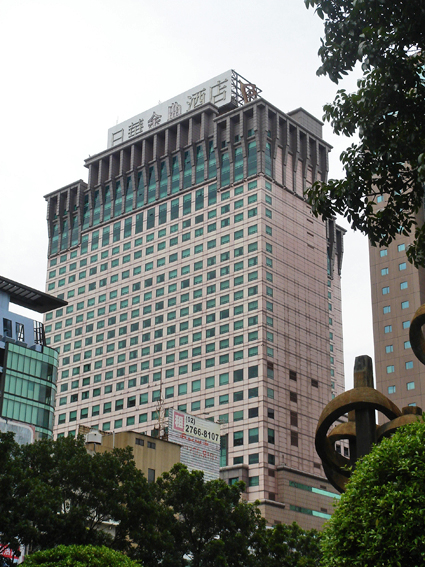
- Interactive map of The Splendor Hotel Taichung 台中金典酒店

General information
- Type: Hotel
- Location: No. 1049, Jianxing Road, West District, Taichung, Taiwan
- Coordinates: 24°9′36″N 120°39′36″E
- Completed: 1998

Height
- Architectural: 130 m (430 ft)

Technical details
- Floor count: 32
- Floor area: 118,437.06 m^{2} (1,274,845.9 sq ft)

Design and construction
- Architect: Chu-Yuan Lee

The Splendor Hotel Taichung, or Grand Formosa Taichung (Chinese: 台中金典酒店) is a skyscraper hotel completed in 1998, located in West District, Taichung, Taiwan. The height of the building is 130 m (430 ft), with a floor area of 118,437.06 m^{2} (1,274,845.9 sq ft). The hotel consists of 32 floors above ground and six basement levels.

== The Hotel ==
The exterior of the hotel was designed by Taiwanese architect Chu-Yuan Lee. The five-star hotel has a total of 222 rooms and includes themed restaurants, a café, a cigar bar, a large banquet hall as well as an outdoor sky pool overlooking Taichung.

The hotel features a "Made in Taiwan" souvenir and gift shop.

=== Restaurants and Bars ===
- Brasserie: A buffet located on the 12th floor.
- Splendor Garden Restaurant: A Chinese restaurant located on the 15th floor featuring Chinese cuisine.
- Laura's Steak House: Another restaurant on the 12th floor offering steaks, and a view of Taichung's skyline.
- Splendor Teppanyaki: A restaurant offering Japanese-style teppanyaki.
- Lobby Lounge: A lounge offering a variety of light meals and beverages.

== See also ==
- Le Meridien Taichung
- National Hotel (Taiwan)
- Millennium Vee Hotel Taichung
