= Taiwan Summit Tower =

Coordinates: 24°9′53″N 120°38′39″E

- 允將TST台灣之鑽

General information
- Status: Under construction
- Location: Xitun District, Taichung, Taiwan
- Construction started: 2024
- Completed: 2029

Height
- Roof: 182.55 m (598.9 ft)

Technical details
- Floor count: 40

Design and construction
- Architects: Wimberly Allison Tong & Goo; Huang Yu-Wen Architects
- Developer: Yun Jiang

Taiwan Summit Tower (Chinese: 允將TST台灣之鑽) is an under-construction office skyscraper project developed by Yun Jiang located in 7th Redevelopment Zone, Xitun District, Taichung, Taiwan. Upon its expected completion in 2029, it will be the third tallest building in Taichung. The architectural height of building is 182.55 m (598.9 ft), and it comprises 40 floors above ground, as well as 9 basement levels and 138 units.

== See also ==
- List of tallest buildings in Taiwan
- List of tallest buildings in Taichung
