= Alioth Palace =

Residential building in Xitun, Taichung, Taiwan

Alioth Palace 聯聚玉衡大廈
- Interactive map of the Alioth Palace 聯聚玉衡大廈 area

General information
- Status: Under construction
- Type: Residential building
- Location: Shizheng North 7th Road, Xitun District, Taichung, Taiwan
- Coordinates: 24°09′58″N 120°38′19″E
- Construction started: 11 March 2026
- Completed: 2030

Height
- Architectural: 202 m (663 ft)

Technical details
- Floor count: 51 above ground 8 below ground
- Floor area: 83,076.65 m^{2} (894,229.6 sq ft)

Design and construction
- Architects: Kuo + Huang and Associates

Alioth Palace (Chinese: 聯聚玉衡大廈), is an under construction, 202 m (663 ft), 51-storey residential building located in Xitun District, Taichung, Taiwan. Construction of the building started on 11 March 2026 and it will become the tallest residential building in Taichung upon its expected completion in early 2030.

== See also ==
- List of tallest buildings in Taiwan
- List of tallest buildings in Taichung
- Taichung 7th Redevelopment Zone
