= Taichung Time Square CBD =

Skyscraper office building in Xitun, Taichung, Taiwan

Taichung Time Square CBD 興富發CBD時代廣場
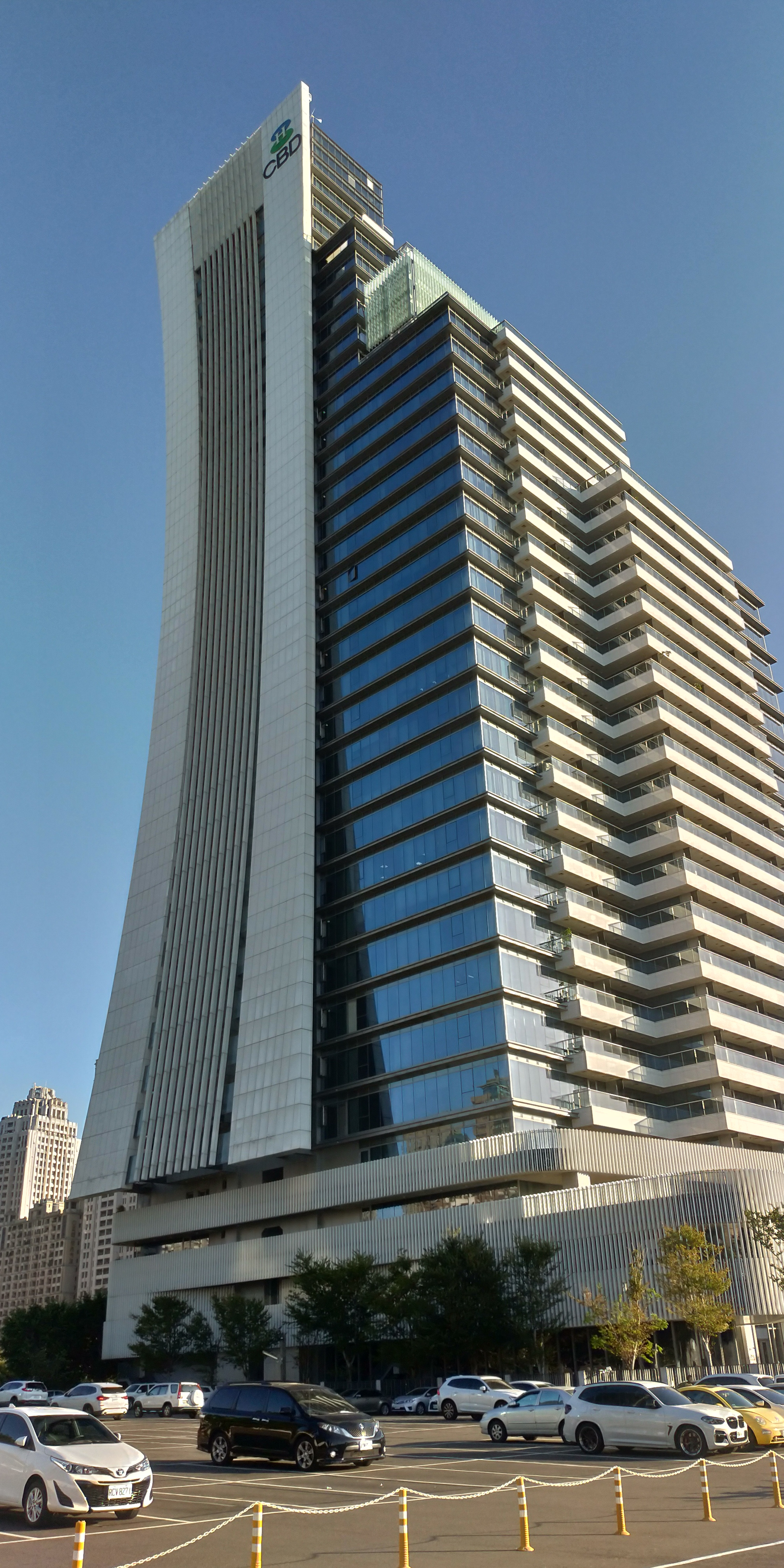
- Interactive map of the Taichung Time Square CBD 興富發CBD時代廣場 area

General information
- Status: Completed
- Type: Office
- Location: 213 Chaofu Road, Xitun District, Taichung, Taiwan
- Coordinates: 24.1621°N 120.6356°E
- Construction started: 2013
- Completed: 2015

Height
- Architectural: 149 metres (489 ft)

Technical details
- Floor count: 34
- Floor area: 66,660 m^{2} (717,500 sq ft)

Design and construction
- Architects: MAG architects & associates

The Taichung Time Square CBD (Chinese: 興富發CBD時代廣場; pinyin: Xìng fù fā CBD shídài guǎngchǎng) is a skyscraper office building located on 213 Chaofu Road, Xitun District, Taichung, Taiwan. Construction of the building started in 2013 and it was completed in 2015. The height of the building is 149 m (489 ft), with a floor area of 66,660 m^{2} (717,500 sq ft), and it comprises 34 floors above ground, as well as seven basement levels. The building is 22nd tallest building in Taichung. The building is similar in appearance to Sompo Japan Building. The 34th floor of the building houses the American steakhouse restaurant Smith & Wollensky, which opened on 12 June 2024.

== Location ==
The building is located in Taichung's 7th Redevelopment Zone, which is central business district of Taichung and houses many tourist attractions, such as Huilai Monument Archaeology Park and National Taichung Theater.

== Design ==
Due to height restriction in the area, the volume of the building gradually retreats to form a setback, which forms a terrace space. The building and the terrace overlap to the roof garden, forming a forest in the sky. The terrace space is surrounded by green trees with vertical glass grids, allowing this green forest glass box to be integrated with the exterior of the building, which presents a novel look in the exterior design.

== See also ==
- List of tallest buildings in Asia
- List of tallest buildings in Taiwan
- List of tallest buildings in Taichung
