= International Trade Center 260 =

Skyscraper office building in North District, Taichung, Taiwan

International Trade Center 260 亞太雲端
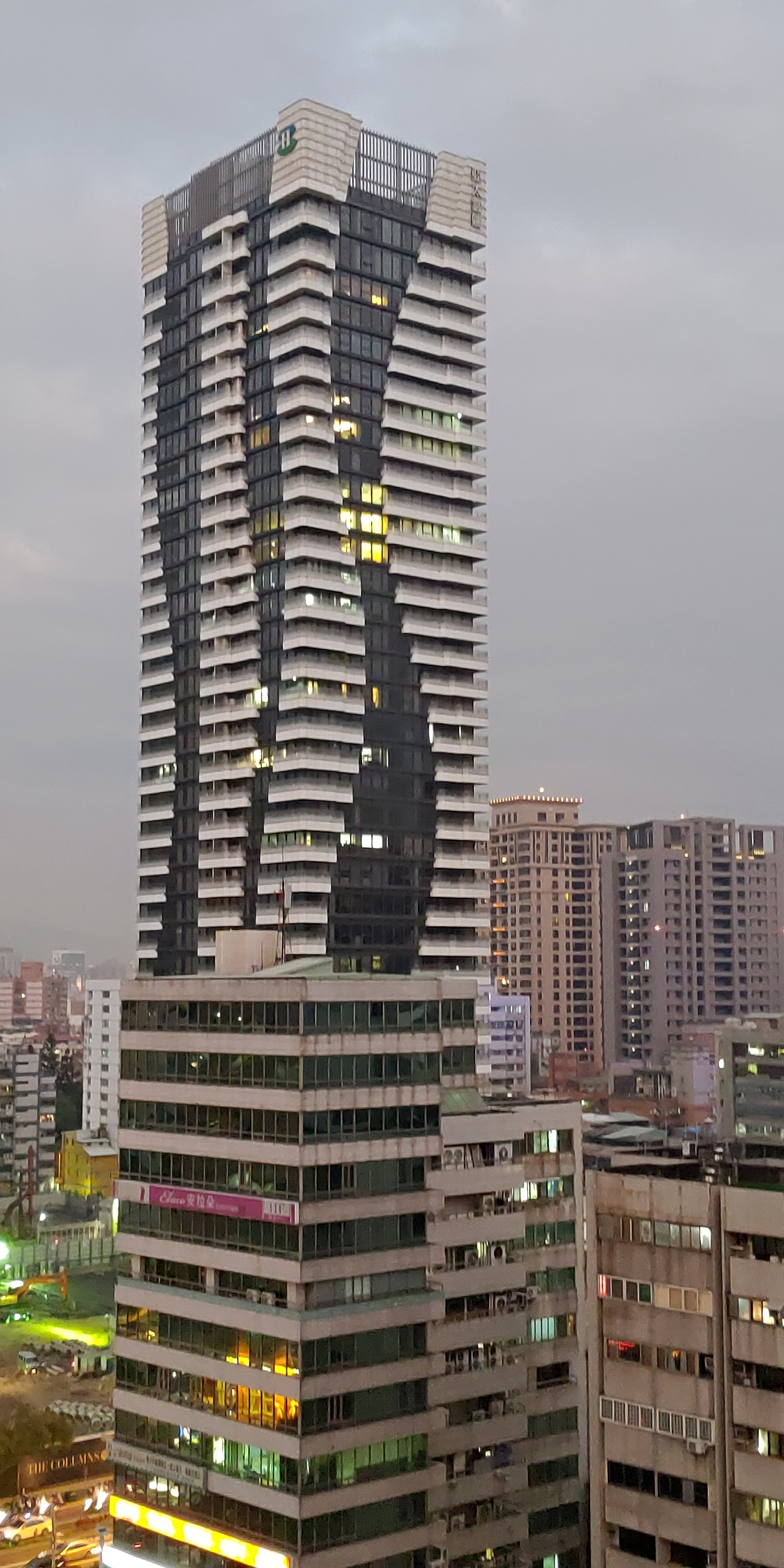
- Interactive map of the International Trade Center 260 亞太雲端 area

General information
- Status: Completed
- Type: Office building
- Classification: Office
- Location: No. 360, Section 2, Taiwan Boulevard, North District, Taichung, Taiwan
- Coordinates: 24°9′16.56″N 120°39′54.84″E
- Completed: 2001

Height
- Roof: 141.73 m (465.0 ft)

Technical details
- Floor count: 39

International Trade Center 260, formerly known as Asia Rich Tower (Chinese: 亞太雲端; pinyin: Yàtài yúnduān), is a skyscraper office building located in North District, Taichung, Taiwan. The height of the building is 141.73 m (465.0 ft) and it comprises 39 floors above ground, as well as four basement levels. The building was originally completed in 2001 as Asia Rich Tower, but was later renovated and changed its name to International Trade Center 260, but keeping its Chinese name the same. In 2010, the façades of the building were demolished and modifications were performed on the walls whilst maintaining the main structure of the previous building. The original building had a green façade and the renovated building has a white façade with vertical black stripes. The renovation process was completed in 2013.

As of January 2021, the building is the tallest in the district and 25th tallest in the city.

== See also ==
- List of tallest buildings in Taiwan
- List of tallest buildings in Taichung
