= Royal Landmark Tower =

Residential skyscraper in Xitun, Taichung, Taiwan

Royal Landmark Tower 總太東方帝國
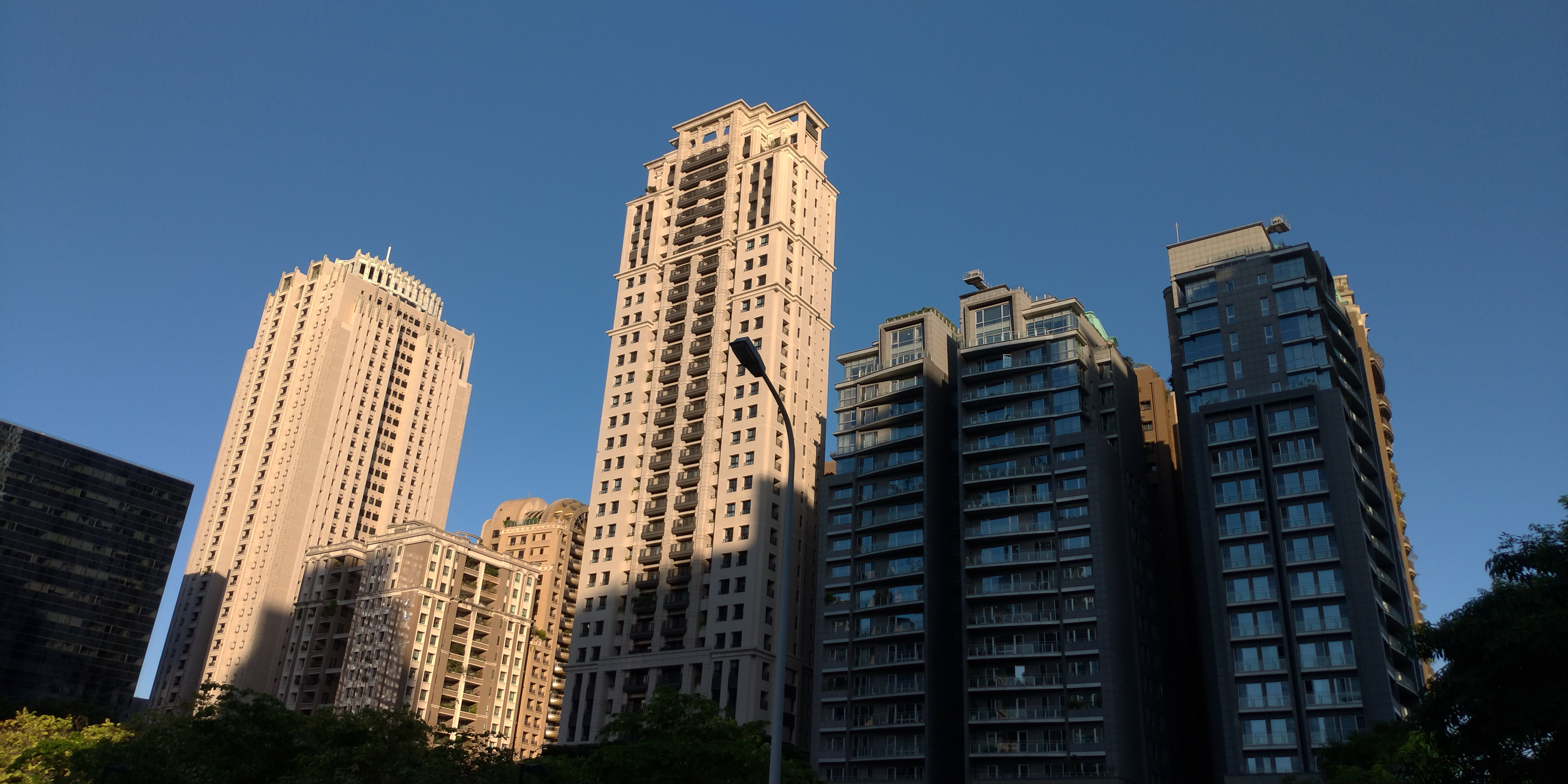

General information
- Status: Completed
- Type: Residential
- Location: Xitun District, Taichung, Taiwan
- Coordinates: 24.1581638°N 120.64579821°E
- Completed: 2010

Height
- Architectural: 158 m (518 ft)

Technical details
- Floor count: 38

The Royal Landmark Tower (Chinese: 總太東方帝國; pinyin: Zǒng tài dōngfāng dìguó) is a residential skyscraper located in Xitun District, Taichung, Taiwan. It was completed in 2010. It is one of the tallest residential buildings in Taichung. The height of the building is 158 m (518 ft), and it comprises 38 floors above ground.

== See also ==
- List of tallest buildings in Taiwan
- List of tallest buildings in Taichung
- Taichung's 7th Redevelopment Zone
