= Yun Yan Building =

Residential skyscraper in Xitun District of Taichung, Taiwan

Yun Yan Building 親家雲硯
- Interactive map of the Yun Yan Building 親家雲硯 area

General information
- Status: Completed
- Type: Residential
- Location: No. 265, Shizheng North 1st Road, Xitun District, Taichung, Taiwan
- Coordinates: 24.160585308647182°N 120.63886281284822°E
- Completed: 2015

Height
- Architectural: 143.7 m (471 ft)

Technical details
- Floor count: 39
- Floor area: 56,936 m^{2} (612,850 sq ft)

The Yun Yan Building, also known as King's Vision (Chinese: 親家雲硯), is a 39-story, 143.7 m (471 ft) residential skyscraper completed in 2015 and located in Taichung's 7th Redevelopment Zone, Xitun District, Taichung, Taiwan. The building has a total floor area of 56,936 m^{2} (612,850 sq ft) and six basement levels. As of February 2021, it is 24th tallest building in Taichung. The building was constructed under strict requirements of preventing damage caused by earthquakes and typhoons common in Taiwan.

== See also ==
- List of tallest buildings in Taiwan
- List of tallest buildings in Taichung
- Taichung's 7th Redevelopment Zone
