= Ling-Ding Tower =

Skyscraper office building in West, Taichung, Taiwan

Ling-Ding Tower 林鼎高峰
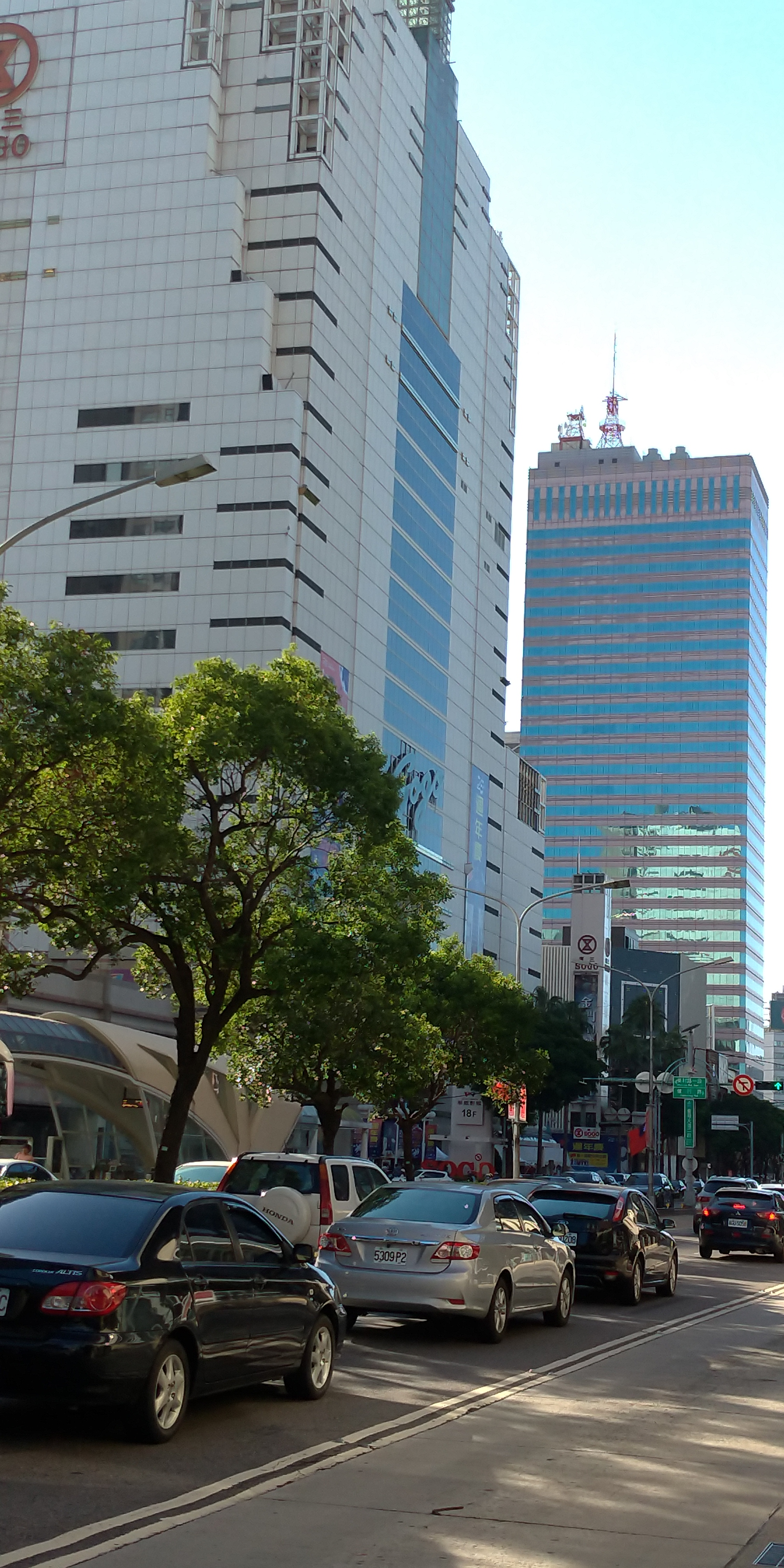
- Interactive map of the Ling-Ding Tower 林鼎高峰 area

General information
- Status: Completed
- Type: Office building
- Classification: Office
- Location: No. 489, Section 2, Taiwan Boulevard, West District, Taichung, Taiwan
- Coordinates: 24.15648027636576°N 120.66013539754977°E
- Completed: 1994

Height
- Roof: 427 ft (130 m)

Technical details
- Floor count: 33
- Lifts/elevators: 7

Ling-Ding Tower (Chinese: 林鼎高峰; pinyin: Lín dǐng gāofēng), is a skyscraper office building located in West District, Taichung, Taiwan. The height of the building is 427 ft (130 m) and it comprises 33 floors above ground and four basement levels. The building was completed in 1994 and was one of the earliest skyscrapers in Taichung. The fourth floor of the building houses the Taipei Language Institute's Taichung campus. As of January 2021, the building is the 34th tallest in Taichung.

== See also ==
- List of tallest buildings in Taiwan
- List of tallest buildings in Taichung
- Shr-Hwa International Tower
