= The Landmark (Taichung) =

Office building in Xitun, Taichung, Taiwan

The Landmark 聯聚中雍大廈
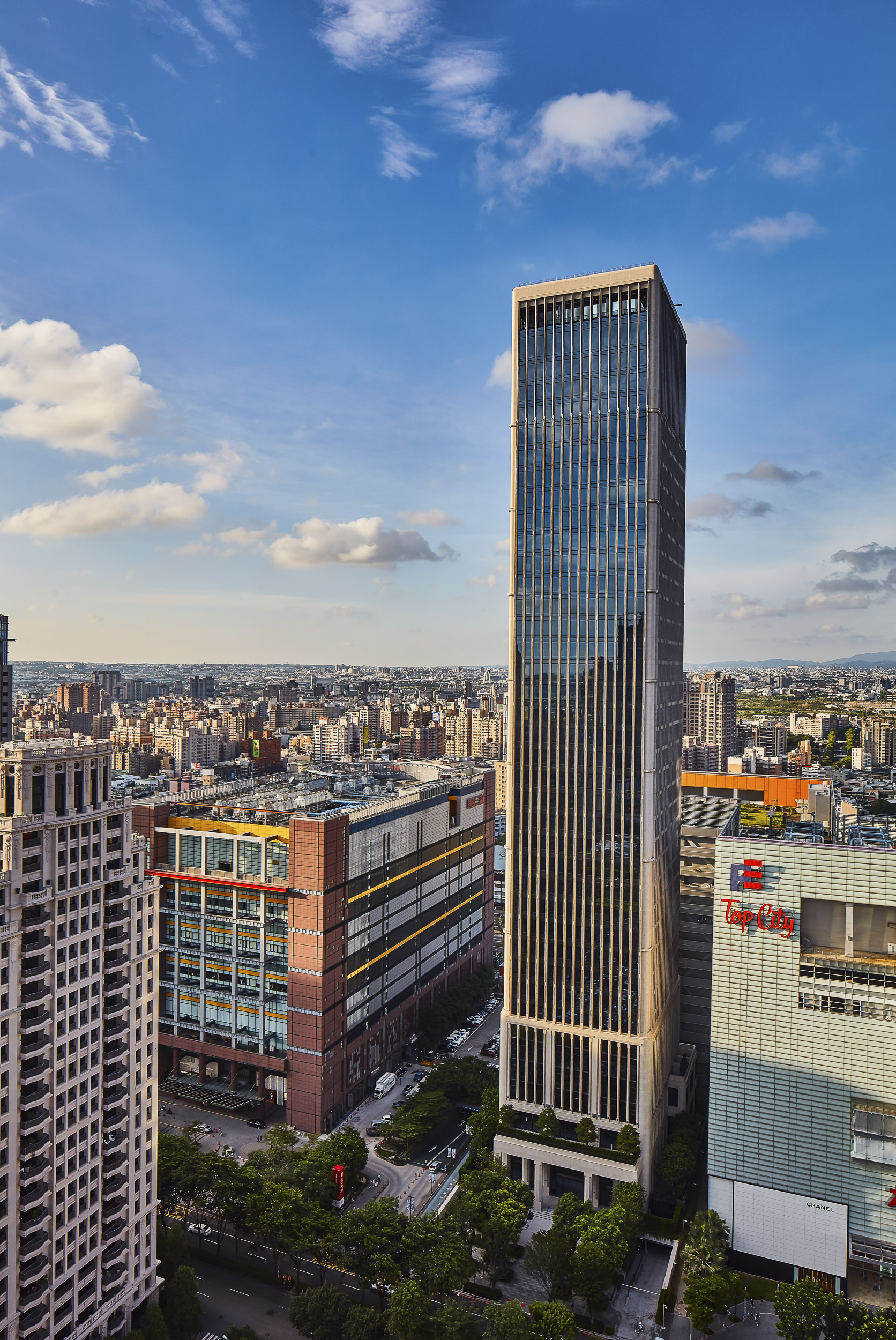
- Interactive map of the The Landmark 聯聚中雍大廈 area

Record height
- Tallest in Taichung from 2018 to 2022^{[I]}
- Preceded by: Shr-Hwa International Tower
- Surpassed by: Taichung Commercial Bank Headquarters

General information
- Status: Completed
- Type: Office building
- Classification: Office
- Location: Xitun District, Taichung, Taiwan
- Coordinates: 24°9′50.8″N 120°38′38.3″E
- Completed: 2018

Height
- Roof: 192.0 m (629.9 ft)

Technical details
- Floor count: 39
- Floor area: 62,012 m^{2} (667,490 sq ft)

The Landmark (Chinese: 聯聚中雍大廈) is a skyscraper located in Xitun District, Taichung, Taiwan. As of December 2020, it is the tallest in Taichung and 11th tallest in Taiwan. The height of the building is 192.0 m (629.9 ft), the floor area is 62,012 m^{2} (667,490 sq ft), and it comprises 39 floors above ground, as well as seven basement levels.

The appearance design is based on the shape of a Chinese-style comb. The whole building adopts the most simple and stable long rectangle, and the corners are cut to arc to soften the skyline. The building materials of the whole building are made of beige granite and grey glass, and partly matched with dark grey metal panels.

== See also ==
- List of tallest buildings in Taiwan
- List of tallest buildings in Taichung
- Taichung’s 7th Redevelopment Zone
