= Fubon Sky Tree =

Residential skyscraper in Xitun District of Taichung, Taiwan

Fubon Sky Tree 富邦天空樹
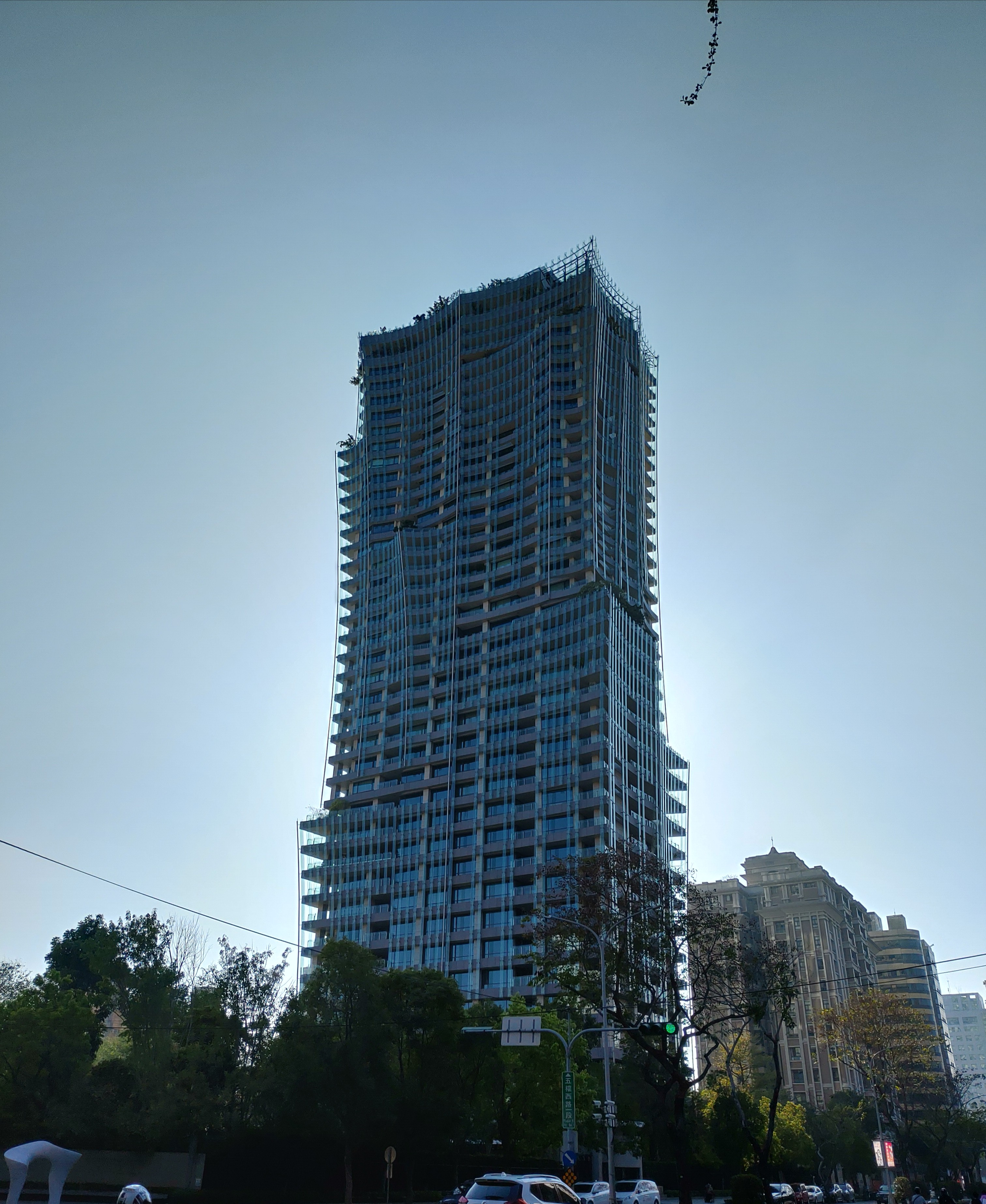

General information
- Status: Completed
- Type: Residential
- Location: No.169, Section 1, Wuquan West Road, West District, Taichung, Taiwan
- Coordinates: 24°08′22″N 120°39′34″E
- Construction started: 2013
- Completed: 2016

Height
- Architectural: 155.3 m (510 ft)

Technical details
- Floor count: 39

Design and construction
- Architect: Toyo Ito

The Fubon Sky Tree (Chinese: 富邦天空樹; pinyin: Fù bāng tiānkōng shù) is a residential skyscraper in West District, Taichung, Taiwan. Construction of the building began in 2013 and it was completed in 2016. The height of the building is 155.3 m (510 ft), and it comprises 39 floors above ground, as well as four basement levels. The building was designed by the Japanese architect Toyo Ito.

== Design ==
The exterior design comes with stone walls, glass façades and double-layered exterior walls, which have both energy-saving effects, and the irregularities of the house body stand out to symbolize the branches of a large tree. The terraces of special households are like a "canopy", adding to the overall bionic sense of the building. The first floor of the entrance hall has a height of 6 meters. The interior design combines simplistic styles resembling nature, such as trees, flowers, and ripples. One can see the outdoor garden green from the large glass windows of the lobby, and the public facilities, which include a swimming pool, a banquet hall, etc. are located on the 38th and 39th floors in order to enable the residences to enjoy the skyline of Taichung at night.

== See also ==
- List of tallest buildings in Asia
- List of tallest buildings in Taiwan
- List of tallest buildings in Taichung
- La Bella Vita (skyscraper)
