= Le Meridien Taichung =

Hotel in Central, Taichung, Taiwan

Le Méridien Taichung
- 台中李方艾美酒店
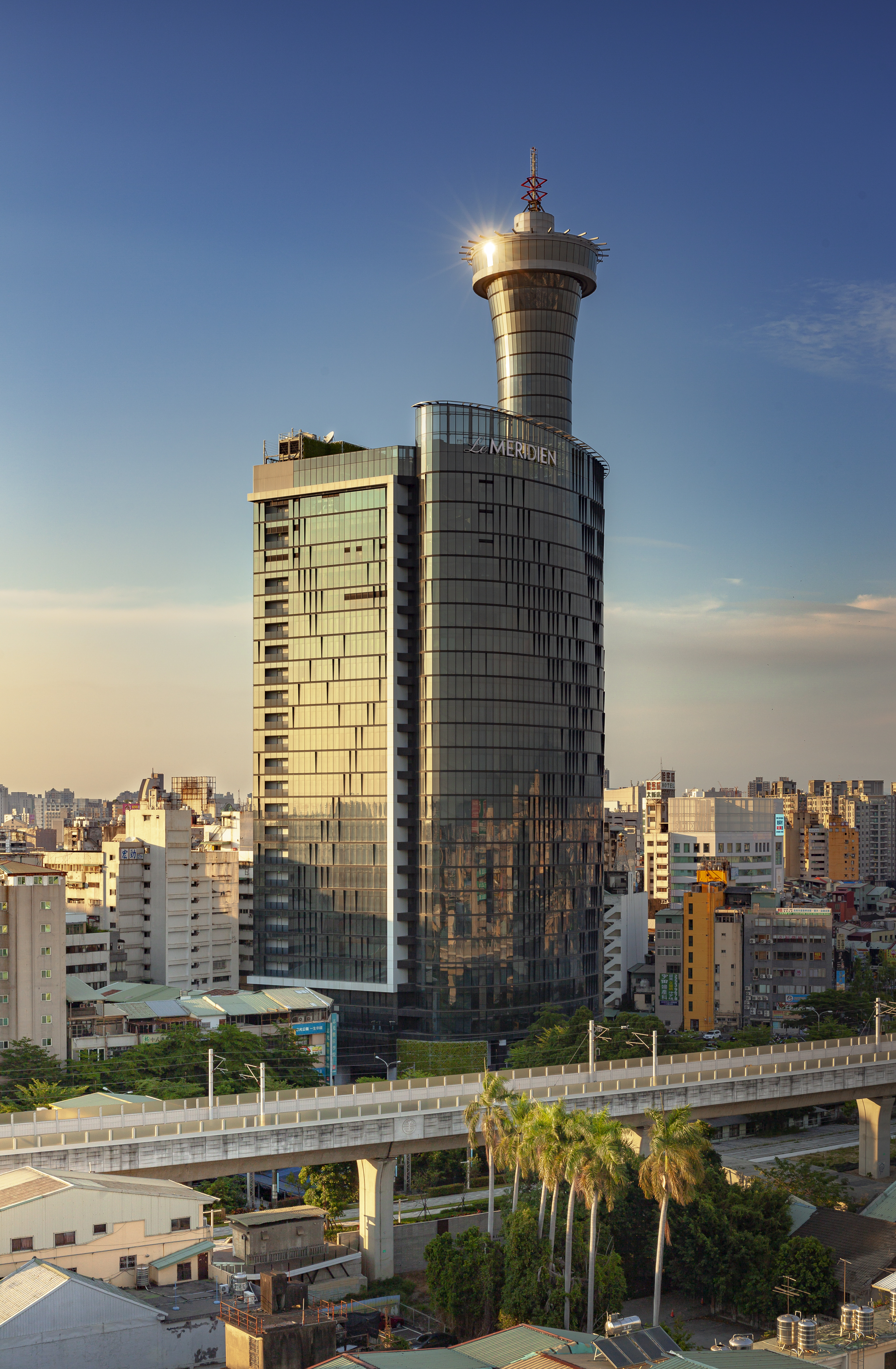

General information
- Type: hotel
- Location: Central, Taichung, Taiwan
- Coordinates: 24°08′12″N 120°40′59″E
- Completed: 1999
- Renovated: 2015

Height
- Height: 178 m (584 ft)

Technical details
- Floor count: 30

The Le Méridien Taichung (Chinese: 台中李方艾美酒店) is a 22-storey hotel located in Central District, Taichung City, Taiwan. It is the 17th tallest building in Taiwan and the third tallest building in the city of Taichung. The hotel closed due to a fire in 2005. It reopened on October 30, 2022, following major renovations.

== Location ==
It is located in the center of Taichung, almost right in front of the Taichung Train Station.

== History ==
The hotel opened in 1999 as the Golden Plaza Hotel. On Saturday, 26 February 2005, at 16:00 (08:00 GMT) a fire broke out in an upper floor. Those people located below the fire in the building were able to escape, taking cover from falling glass. Nine people were trapped on the roof of the building, 300 feet in the air, and were rescued by helicopter. 4 people were killed and 3 more injured. The cause of the fire was found to be an accident by a construction crew. In 2013, the damaged structure was purchased by Royal Seasons Hotels, which began renovations. The hotel's reopening was postponed due to the COVID-19 pandemic. It reopened in 2022 as Le Méridien Taichung, managed by the Le Méridien division of Marriott Hotels.

== See also ==
- List of tallest buildings in Taiwan
- List of tallest buildings in Taichung
