= Shr-Hwa International Tower =

High-rise building in Taiwan

- 世華國際大樓
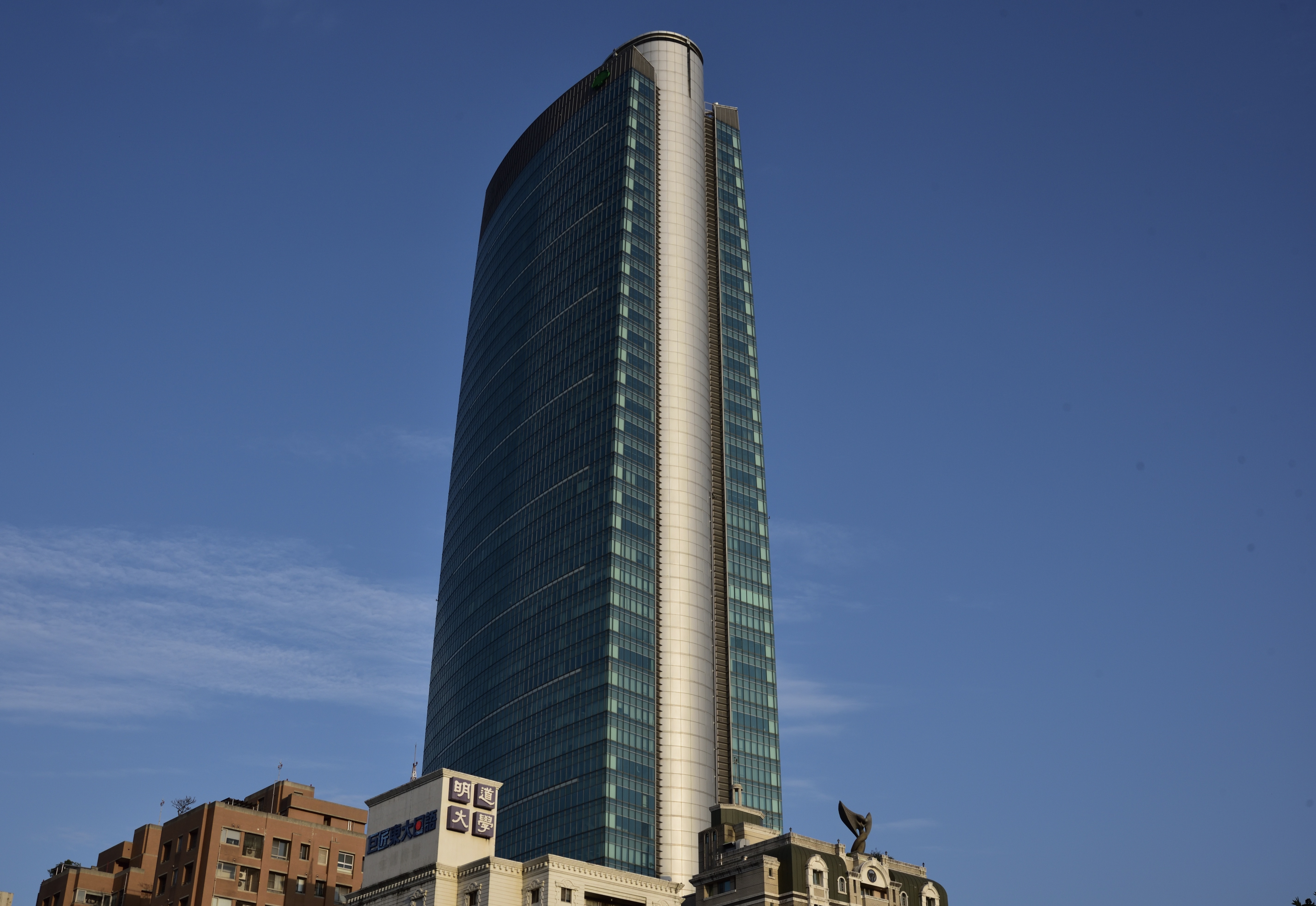

General information
- Location: West, Taichung, Taiwan
- Coordinates: 24°8′59.58″N 120°39′53.69″E
- Construction started: 2001
- Completed: 2004

Height
- Height: 177 m (581 ft)

Design and construction
- Architecture firm: Kohn Pedersen Fox Associates

The Shr-Hwa International Tower (Chinese: 世華國際大樓; pinyin: Shìhuá Guójì Dàlóu) is a 47-storey, 177 m (581 ft) tall skyscraper located in West District, Taichung, Taiwan. When it was completed in 2004, it was the tallest building in Taichung and it held the title for 14 years until it was surpassed by The Landmark (Taichung). As of August 2022, it is the 21st tallest building in Taiwan and the second tallest in central Taiwan. This building has a peculiar shape of a bamboo. The 24th to 45th floors of the building houses a five-star hotel - The Landis Taichung.

== Transportation ==
The building is accessible North West from Taichung station of Taiwan Railway.

== See also ==
- List of tallest buildings in Taiwan
