= National Hotel (Taiwan) =

Hotel in West, Taichung, Taiwan

- 全國大飯店
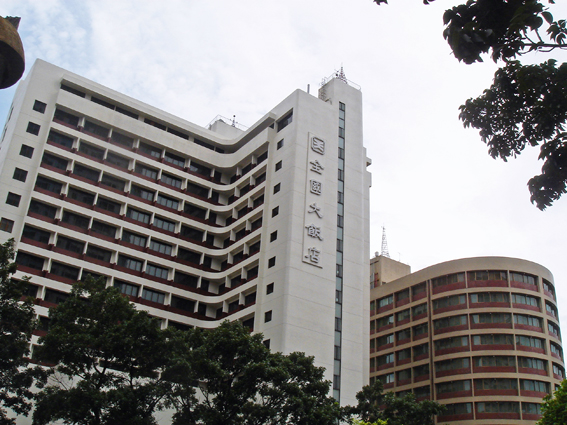
- Interactive map of the National Hotel area

General information
- Type: hotel
- Location: West, Taichung, Taiwan
- Coordinates: 24°09′13″N 120°39′50″E
- Inaugurated: 1 March 1980

Technical details
- Floor count: 15

Website
- www.hotel-national.com.tw

The Hotel National Taichung (Chinese: 全國大飯店; pinyin: Quánguó Dàfàndiàn) is a hotel in West District, Taichung, Taiwan. It is Taichung's first five-star hotel, founded in 1980, the central one of the famous hotel, located in Chungkang Road, the tight Pro with Luyuan Road, National Museum of Natural Science and SOGO Department Store. Currently Qin Mei Group acquisition.

National Hotel have 306 rooms, five Chinese and Western restaurants and Banquet venues, and 400 plane parking spaces.

== See also ==
- Grand Hotel (Taipei)
