= Simple Mart =

Taiwanese supermarket chain

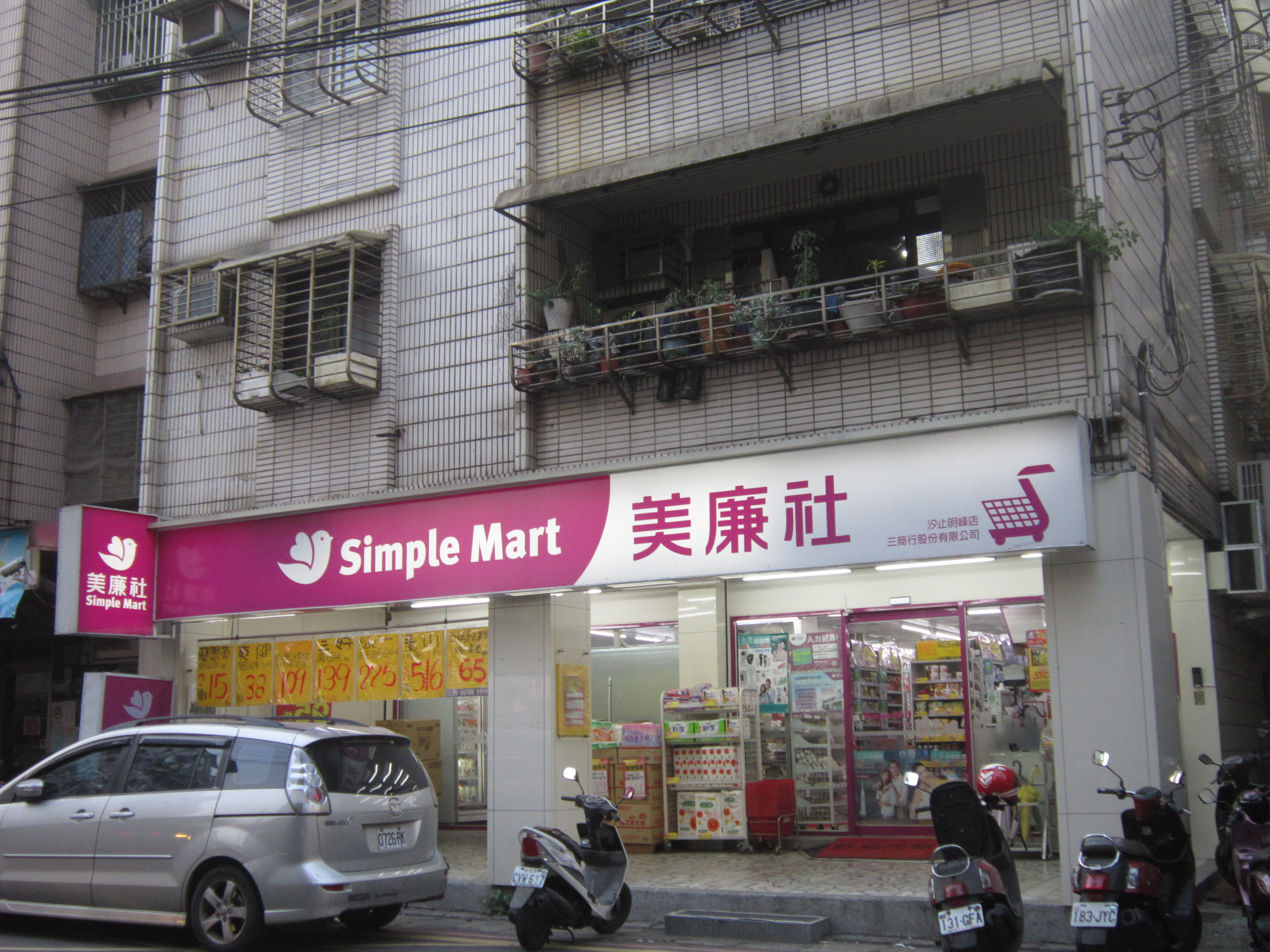
- Type: Public company
- Industry: Retail
- Founded: 2016
- Headquarters: Zhongshan District, Taipei, Taiwan
- Number of locations: 813
- Products: Groceries, consumer goods
- Website: www.simplemart.com.tw

Simple Mart (Chinese: 美廉社) is asupermarket chain in Taiwan. Established in 2006, it had 661 branches in 2018. Its parent company Simple Mart Retail had an initial public offering on the Taipei Exchange on December 17, 2018.

== See also ==
- List of supermarket chains in Taiwan
- Funcom Supermarket
- PX Mart
- RT Mart
