= Hsin Ji Building =

Skyscraper office building in Xinyi District, Taipei, Taiwan

Hsin Ji Building 信基大樓
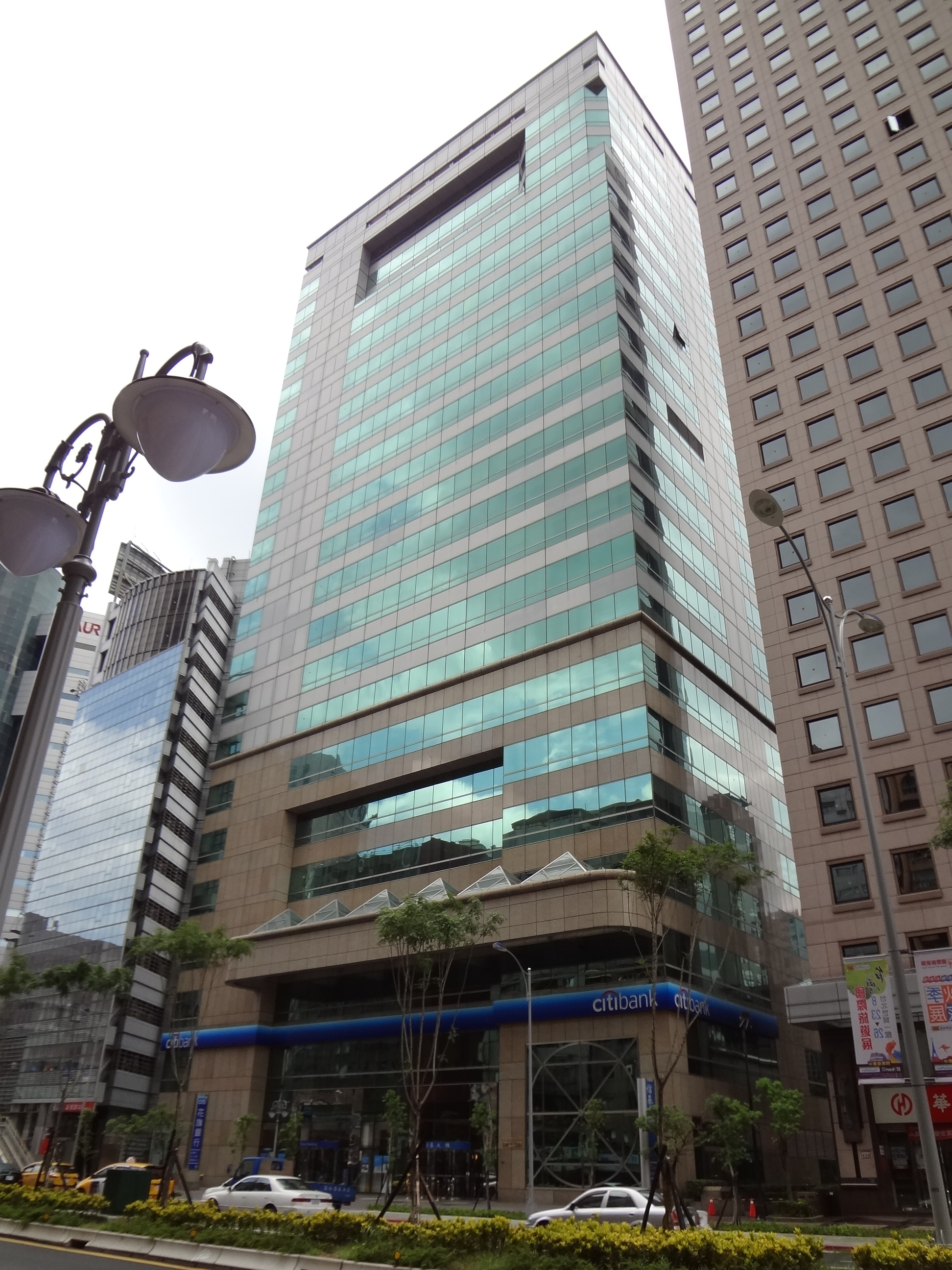
- Interactive map of the Hsin Ji Building 信基大樓 area

General information
- Status: Completed
- Type: Office building
- Classification: Office
- Location: No. 460, Section 4, Xinyi Road, Xinyi District, Taipei, Taiwan
- Coordinates: 25°01′59″N 121°33′32″E
- Completed: 1997

Height
- Roof: 100 m (330 ft)

Technical details
- Floor count: 22
- Floor area: 60,418 m^{2} (650,330 sq ft)

The Hsin Ji Building (Chinese: 信基大樓; pinyin: Xìn jī dàlóu) is a skyscraper office building located in Xinyi District, Taipei, Taiwan. The height of the building is 100 m (330 ft) with a floor area of 60,418 m^{2} (650,330 sq ft), and it comprises 22 floors above ground as well as five basement levels. The building was completed in 1997 and is located next to Taipei Century Plaza, which was also completed in the same year. It houses the Taiwan Gospel Book Room as well as the Taiwan branch offices of Cisco Systems, eBay, IWG plc and Verizon.

In 2017, in order to enhance the energy-saving awareness of commercial office buildings in Taipei and to establish a model for cooperation, the Department of Economic Development of Taipei City Government and Hsin Ji Building have promoted the introduction of smart grid facilities in commercial buildings. By expanding the use of renewable energy and demonstrating the effects of smart energy saving, it hopes to attract more commercial and office buildings to join the city's ranks of smart electricity saving and green energy recycling.

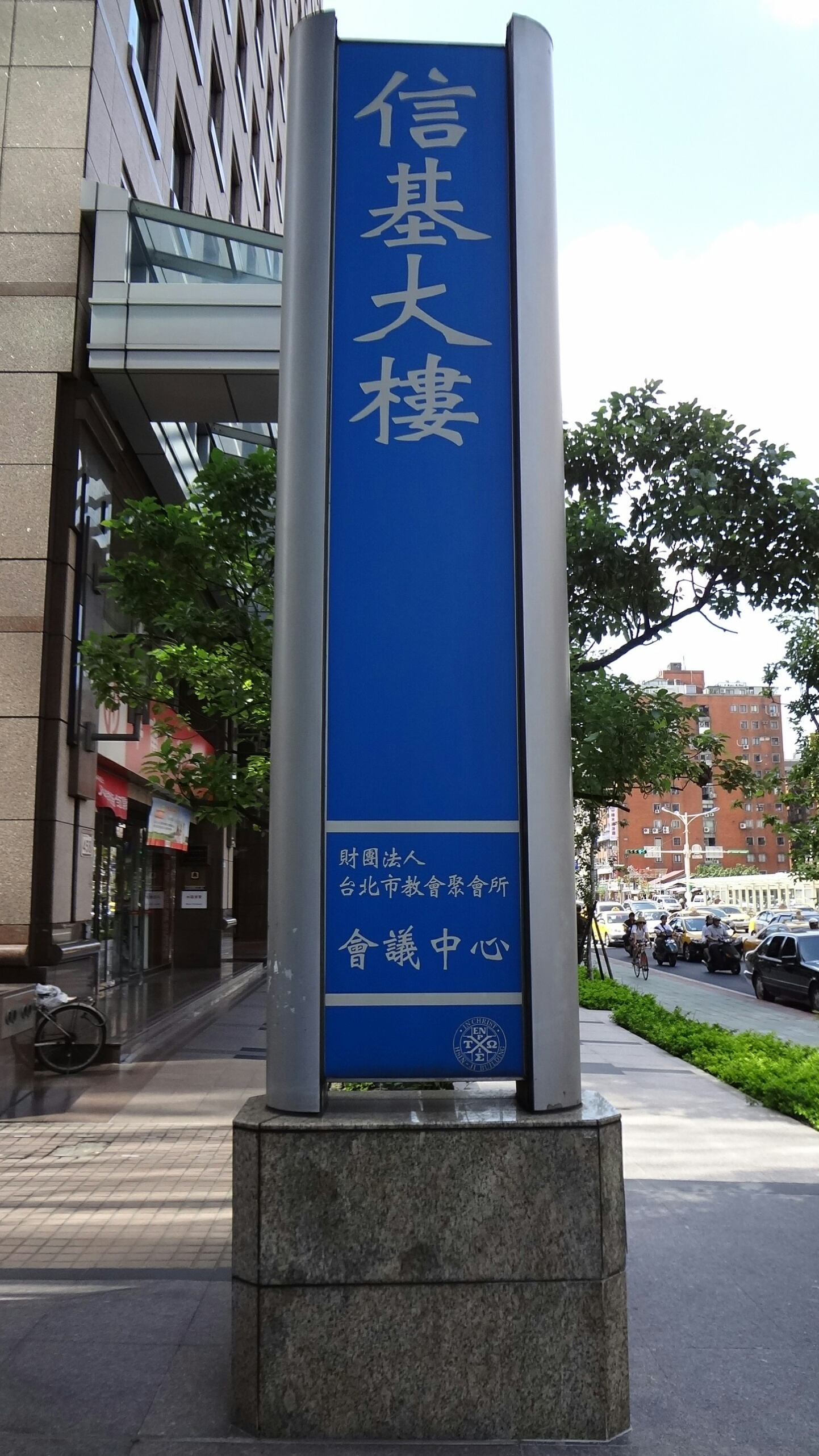
Building sign

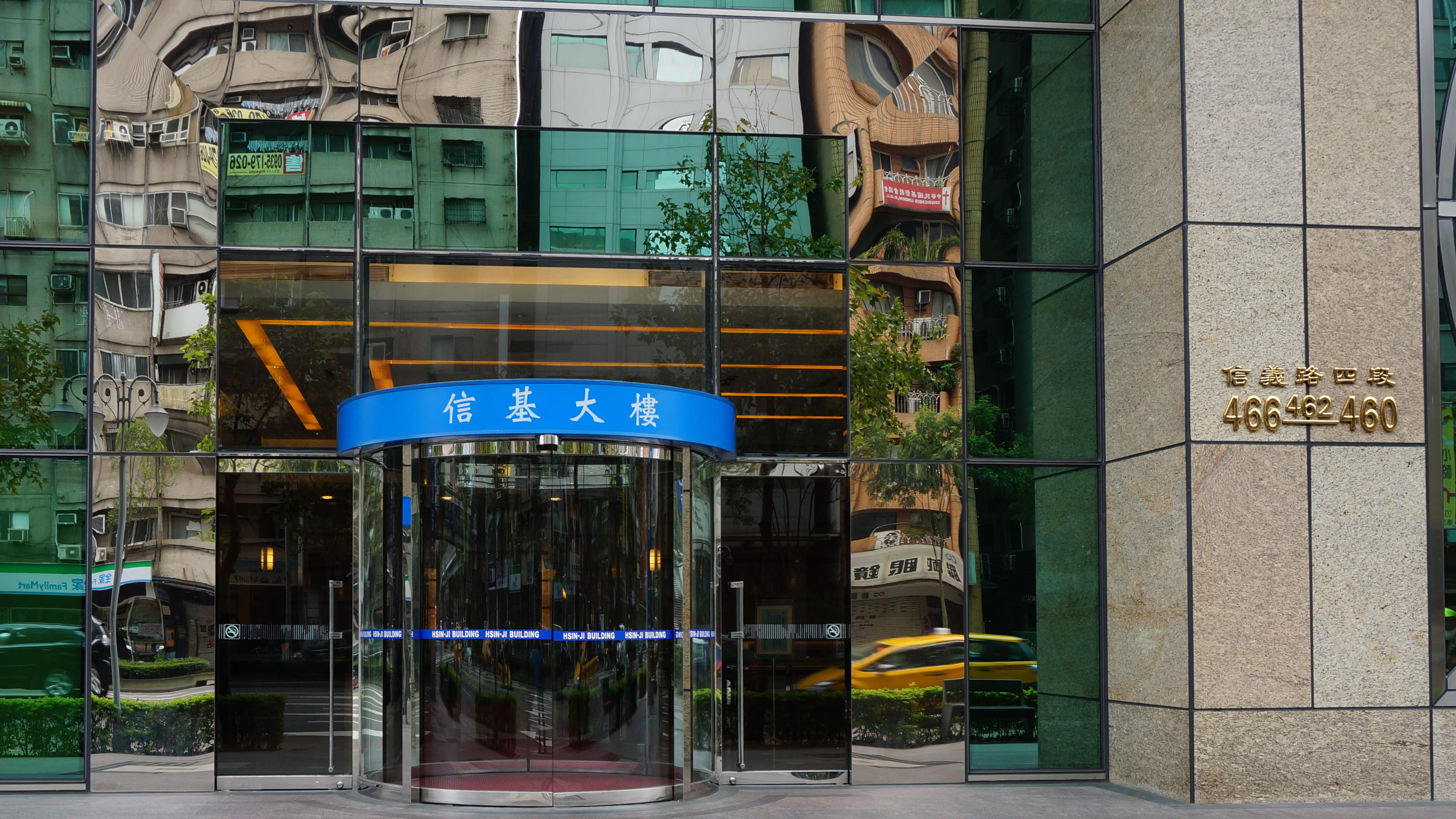
Main Entrance

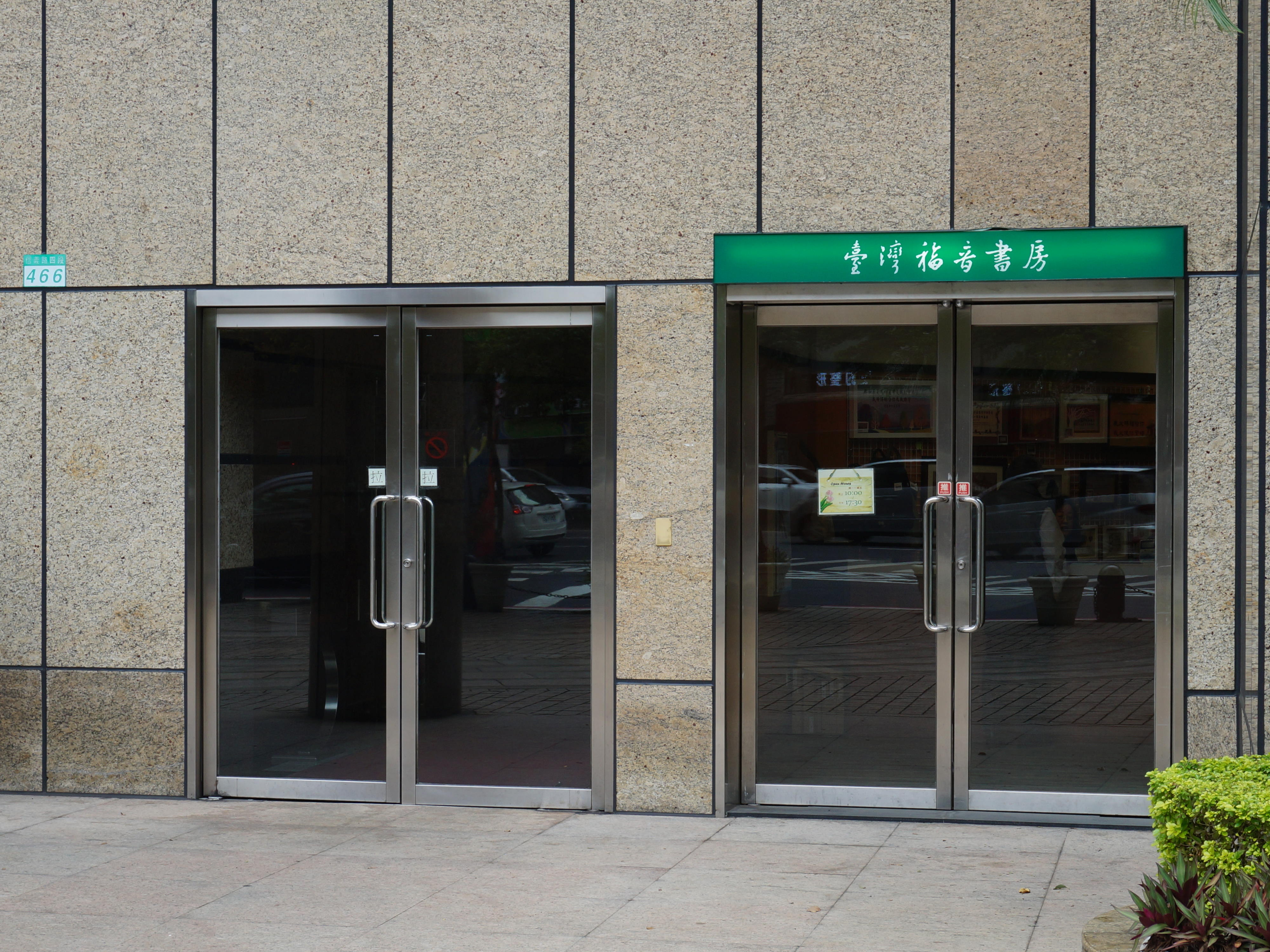
Side Entrance

== See also ==
- List of tallest buildings in Taiwan
- List of tallest buildings in Taipei
- Taipei Century Plaza
- Asia Plaza Building
- Xinyi Anhe MRT Station Entrance Building
