= Polaris Garden =

Residential skyscraper in Xinyi District of Taipei, Taiwan

Polaris Garden 寶徠花園廣場
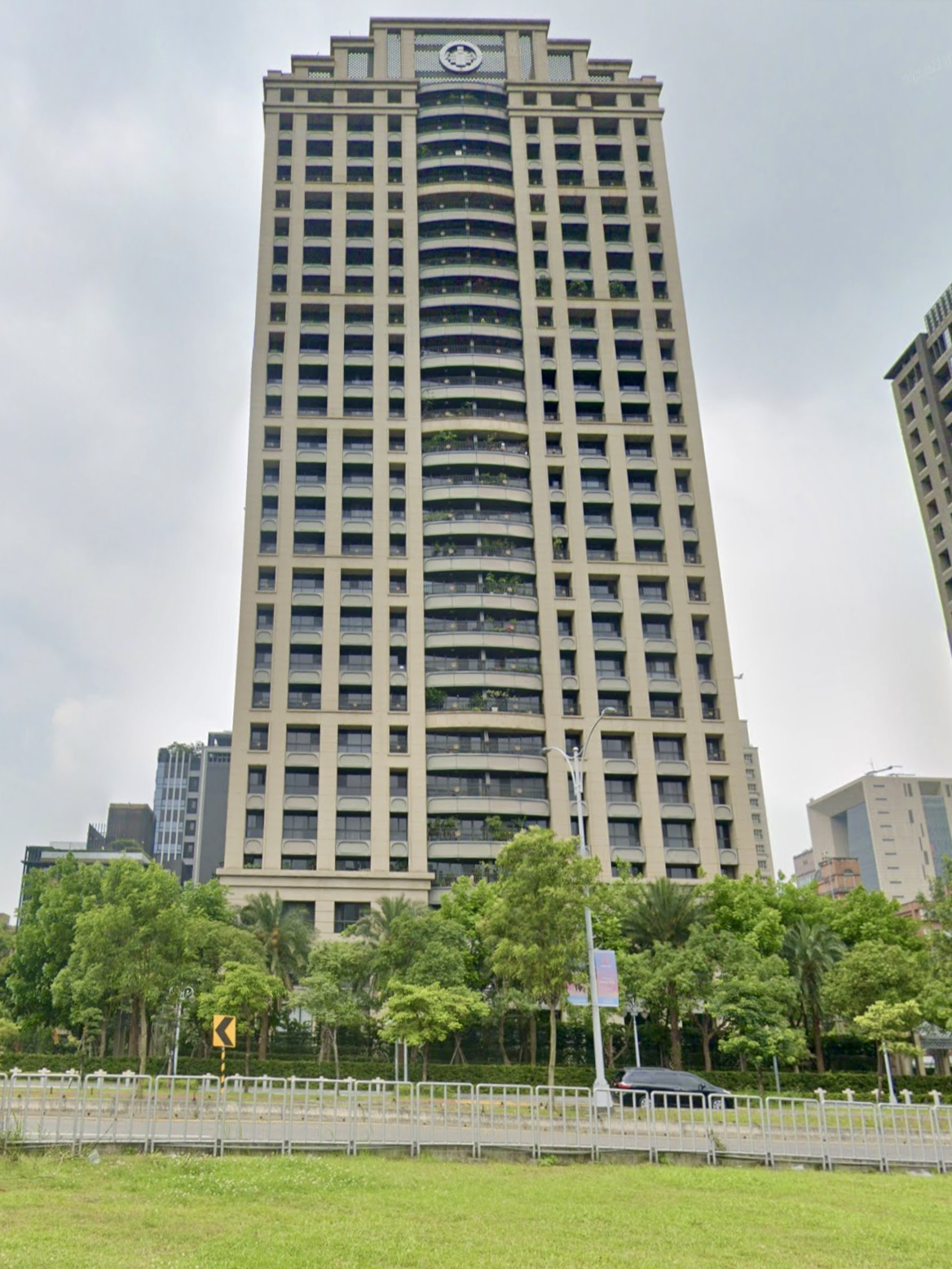
- Interactive map of the Polaris Garden 寶徠花園廣場 area

General information
- Status: Completed
- Type: Residences
- Location: No. 2-8, Lane 91, Section 5, Xinyi Road, Xinyi District, Taipei, Taiwan
- Coordinates: 25.03341653580435°N 121.5712037121009°E
- Completed: December 31, 2007

Height
- Tip: 351 ft (107 m)

Technical details
- Floor count: 27 above ground 3 below ground

Design and construction
- Architect: P&T Group

Polaris Garden, also known as Bao Lai Garden Square (Chinese: 寶徠花園廣場; pinyin: Bǎolái Huāyuán Guǎngchǎng) is a 27-story, 351 ft (107 m) tall residential skyscraper complex located in Xinyi Special District, Taipei, Taiwan. Designed by the Hong Kong–based architectural firm P&T Group, the residential building was completed on December 31, 2007, and provides 106 units of luxury apartments. Facilities of the apartment block include an outdoor swimming pool, sauna, garden, and Mahjong room. Famous residents include former president of Taiwan Chen Shui-bian and his family, co-founder of Breeze Center Aimee Sun and founder of PX Mart Lin Ming-Hsiung.

== See also ==
- List of tallest buildings in Taipei
- Tao Zhu Yin Yuan
- 55 Timeless
- Cloud Top
- Kingdom of Global View
