= Lily pad (disambiguation) =

A lily pad is the leaf of flowering plants of the Nymphaeaceae family, commonly called water lilies.

Lily pad may also refer to:

- Lily pads, a name for the Cooperative Security Location of U.S. worldwide military facilities

Lilypad may refer to:

- LilyPad, an Arduino microcontroller board
- Lilypad, a fictional tablet character from Pixar's Toy Story 5
- The Lilypad, a name for the Floating ecopolis a design for amphibious cities
- Lilypad begonia, a plant with scientific name Begonia nelumbiifolia
- LilyPad, the former, now discontinued built-in score editor for LilyPond music engraving on macOS and Windows
