= List of supermarket chains in Taiwan =

== Current chains ==
- A.mart
- C!ty'super
- Carrefour
- Don Quijote
- Funcom Supermarket
- I-Mei Foods
- Mia C'bon
- PX Mart
- RT-Mart
- Simple Mart
- Surewell Fresh Supermarket

== Defunct chains ==
- Kuma
- Makro
- Market Place
- Matsusei
- Tesco
- Wellcome
