= Kingdom of Global View =

Residential skyscraper complex in Xinyi District of Taipei, Taiwan

Kingdom of Global View 冠德遠見
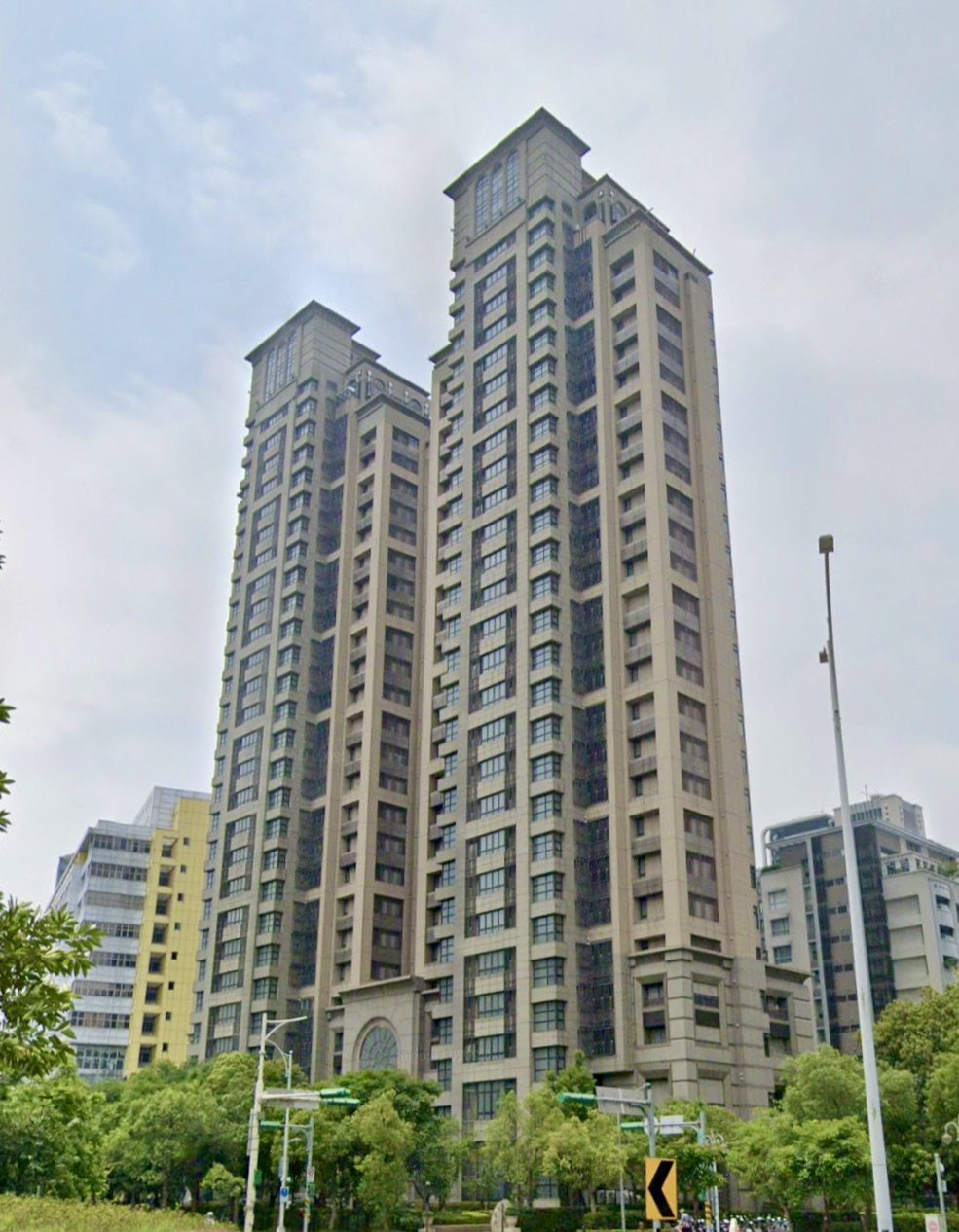
- Interactive map of the Kingdom of Global View 冠德遠見 area

General information
- Status: Completed
- Type: Residences
- Location: No. 95, Section 5, Xinyi Road, Xinyi District, Taipei, Taiwan
- Coordinates: 25.03665347782902°N 121.57194780187797°E
- Completed: 2008

Height
- Tip: 109 m (358 ft)

Technical details
- Floor count: 27

Design and construction
- Architect: Chu-Yuan Lee

Kingdom of Global View (Chinese: 冠德遠見; pinyin: Guān dé yuǎnjiàn) is a 27-story, 109 m (358 ft) tall twin residential skyscraper complex located in Xinyi Special District, Taipei, Taiwan. Designed by the Taiwanese architect Chu-Yuan Lee, the residential complex was completed in 2008 and provides 122 units of luxury apartments. Famous residents include Taiwanese actress Barbie Hsu and her family.

== See also ==
- List of tallest buildings in Taipei
- Tao Zhu Yin Yuan
- 55 Timeless
- Polaris Garden
