= Taipei Century Plaza =

Skyscraper office building in Xinyi District, Taipei, Taiwan

Taipei Century Plaza 世紀金融廣場大樓
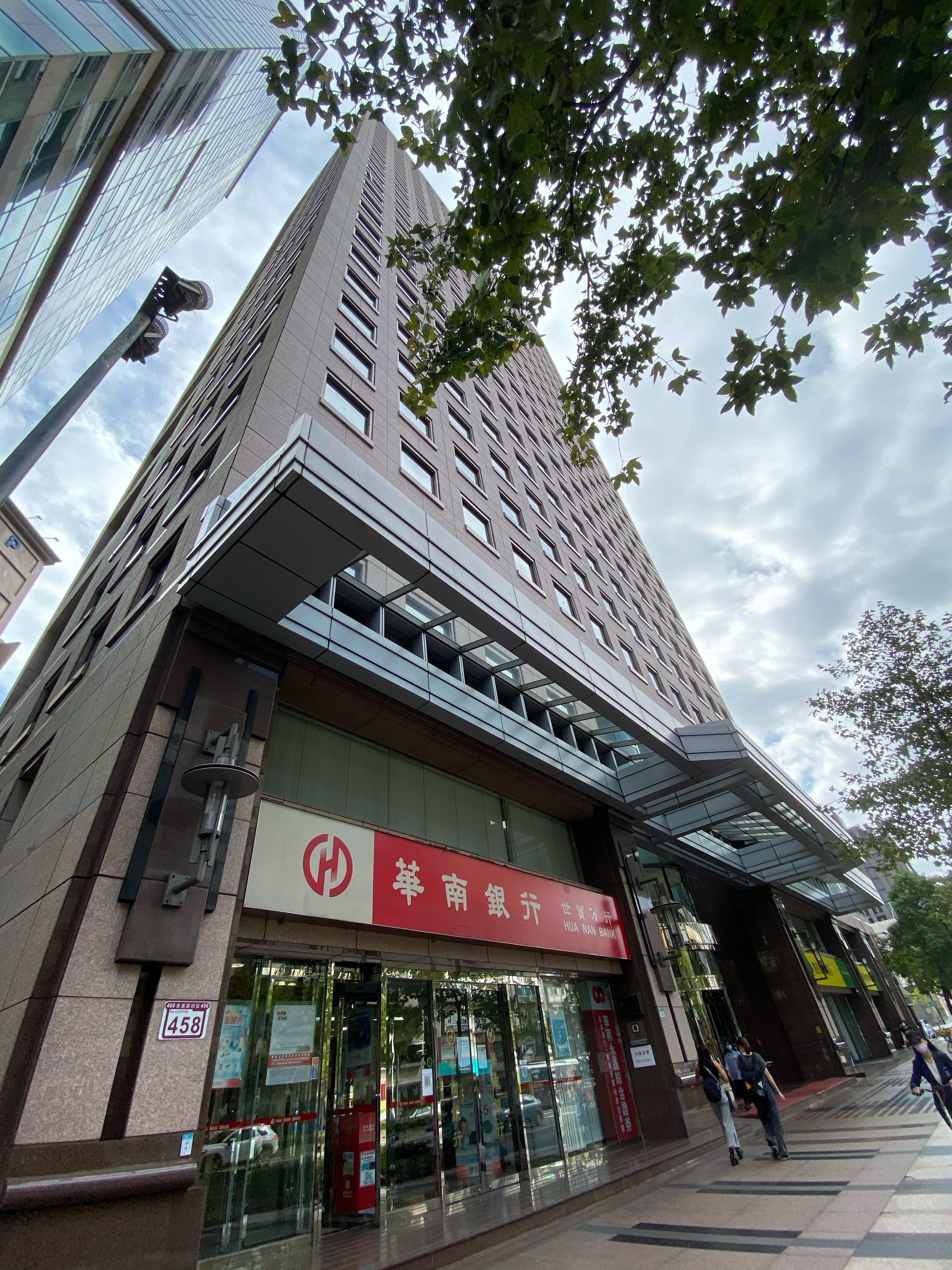
- Interactive map of the Taipei Century Plaza 世紀金融廣場大樓 area

General information
- Status: Completed
- Type: Office building
- Classification: Office
- Location: No. 450, Section 4, Xinyi Road, Xinyi District, Taipei, Taiwan
- Coordinates: 25.03279479472861°N 121.5583638073447°E
- Completed: 1997

Height
- Roof: 107 m (351 ft)

Technical details
- Floor count: 28

Taipei Century Plaza (Chinese: 世紀金融廣場大樓; pinyin: Shìjì jīnróng guǎngchǎng dàlóu), is a skyscraper office building located in Sanzhangli, Xinyi District, Taipei, Taiwan. The height of the building is 107 m (351 ft) and it comprises 28 floors above ground as well as five basement levels. The building was completed in 1997 and is located next to Hsin Ji Building, which was also completed in the same year. The ground floor of the building houses the Shimao branch of Hua Nan Bank.

== See also ==
- List of tallest buildings in Taiwan
- List of tallest buildings in Taipei
- Hsin Ji Building
- Asia Plaza Building
- Xinyi Anhe MRT Station Entrance Building
