= Sotai Xinyi =

Skyscraper in Daan District, Taipei, Taiwan

- 首泰信義
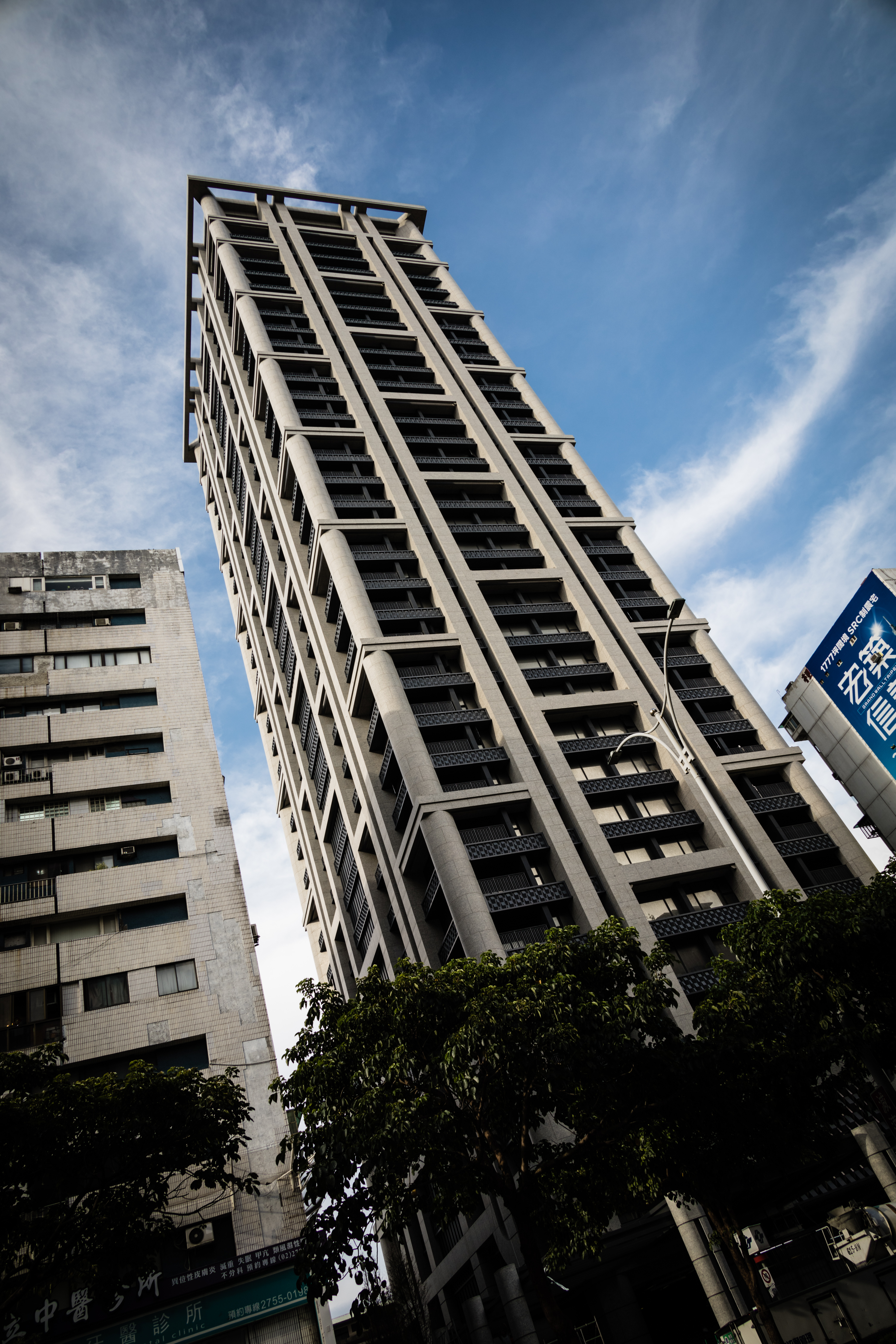
- Sotai Xinyi in 2020

General information
- Status: Completed
- Type: Office building, Residential
- Classification: mixed-use
- Location: No. 257, Section 4, Xinyi Road, Daan District, Taipei, Taiwan
- Coordinates: 25.0336°N 121.5539°E
- Construction started: 2015
- Completed: 2018

Height
- Roof: 122 m (400 ft)

Technical details
- Floor count: 34

Design and construction
- Architect: P&T Group

Sotai Xinyi (Chinese: 首泰信義), also known as Landmark Mansion, is a 34-story, 122 m (400 ft) mixed-use skyscraper building in Daan District, Taipei, Taiwan completed in 2018. Designed by the P&T Group, the 3rd to 18th floors of the building are used for office spaces, whilst the 19th to 34th floors are residential apartment units. The basement of the building connects with the Xinyi Anhe metro station.

== See also ==
- List of tallest buildings in Taiwan
- List of tallest buildings in Taipei
- Cloud Top
- 55 Timeless
- Tao Zhu Yin Yuan
