= Funcom Supermarket =

Taiwanese supermarket chain

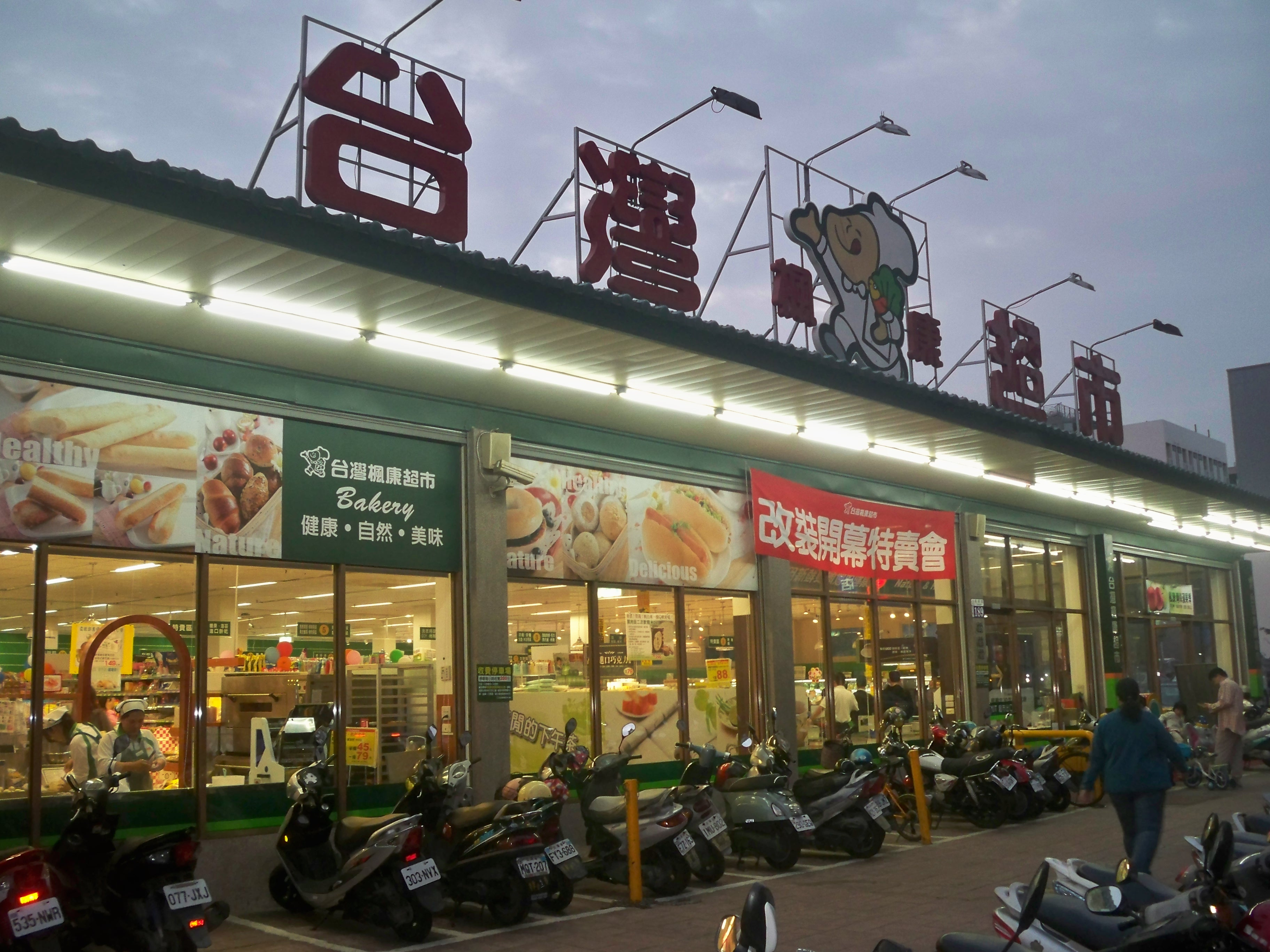
- Type: Joint-stock company
- Industry: Retail
- Founded: 23 April 2008
- Headquarters: Xitun District, Taichung, Taiwan
- Number of locations: 50
- Products: Groceries, consumer goods
- Website: www.supermarket.com.tw

Funcom Supermarket (Chinese: 台灣楓康超市) is a Taiwanese chain of fresh food supermarkets operating primarily in the central and northern regions of Taiwan, including Taichung, Changhua County, Nantou County, Hsinchu County, and Taoyuan City. The chain is owned by a subsidiary of the Sinon Corporation and specializes in fresh produce and in-house prepared foods.

== Overview ==
Funcom Supermarket, initially named Sinon Fresh Supermarket, opened its first store in Caotun Township, Nantou County, in 1988. The company began expanding its market within central Taiwan, operating stores under two banners: Sinon Fresh Supermarket and a larger format known as Sinon Wholesale. By the early 2000s, the company had consolidated its branding under the Hsin Nong Fresh Supermarket name and phased out the wholesale format.

In 2008, the fresh food department of Sinon Corporation was spun off as an independent entity, officially adopting the name Funcom Supermarket. The chain continued its expansion, entering the Hsinchu market in 2017 and launching its first Taoyuan store in Qingpu Special District in 2024.

Many Funcom Supermarket locations operate as standalone stores, often featuring parking facilities. Some branches are open 24 hours, catering to various consumer needs.

== Branches ==
As of mid-2024, Funcom Supermarket operates 50 stores across Taiwan. The branches are concentrated in the following regions:

=== Taoyuan City ===
Qingpu Store (Dayuan District)

=== Hsinchu ===
Jingguo Store (Xiangshan District, Hsinchu) Guangming Store (Zhubei) Jiafeng Store (Zhubei)

=== Taichung ===
Funcom operates multiple locations across Taichung, including popular areas such as Beitun, Xitun, and Nantun Districts. Several stores, like the Chengdu and Tianjin branches, are open 24 hours.

=== Changhua and Nantou ===
Stores are strategically located in both urban centers and smaller towns, including Changhua City, Lukang, and Caotun Township.

== See also ==
- List of supermarket chains in Taiwan
- PX Mart
- RT Mart
