= PX Mart Taichung warehouse fire =

2024 building fire in Taiwan

PX Mart Taichung Warehouse Fire
- Date: 19 December 2024
- Time: 13:24 (UTC+8)
- Location: Dadu Fresh Food Processing Plant of Taiwan Shin Mei Co., Ltd. 26, Section 2, Shatian Road, Dadu District, Taichung, Taiwan; 24.137088°N 120.552309°E
- Cause: Preliminary investigation indicated that sparks generated during welding operations fell through openings between floors and ignited paint and solvents used in basement waterproofing work.
- Deaths: 9
- Injuries: 8

The PX Mart Taichung Warehouse Fire occurred on 19 December 2024 at 1:24 p.m., when a fire broke out at a warehouse of Taiwan Shin Mei Co., Ltd., a fresh food processing facility operated for PX Mart, located in Dadu District, Taichung, Taiwan. The fire killed nine people and injured eight others.

== Background ==
PX Mart's Taichung logistics and warehouse center is located on Shatian Road in Dadu District. The fire occurred in a newly constructed building that had not yet been completed and was still undergoing inspection and acceptance procedures. The facility had been scheduled to begin operations the following year.

The new building covered approximately 28,734 square meters and consisted of four above-ground floors and one basement level. It was designed to support the storage and distribution of merchandise for PX Mart in central Taiwan. The facility contained logistics materials as well as construction materials required for the ongoing project.

At the time of the fire, interior construction work was still underway, including welding of metal structures on the third floor and waterproofing work in the basement. Because the warehouse had not yet entered service, no regular warehouse employees had been assigned there, and only construction workers were present. Large quantities of combustible materials, including insulation materials, paint, and solvents, were stored inside, creating a high fire risk.

== Cause of the fire ==
According to a preliminary report by the Fire Bureau of Taichung City Government, the fire was closely related to welding work being conducted on the third floor. Investigators found that sparks generated during welding operations in a stairwell may have fallen through open vertical spaces into the basement. Waterproofing work was being carried out there, and large quantities of flammable paints and solvents were present. Contact between these materials and the hot sparks was believed to have ignited the initial fire.

An on-site inspection conducted by the Labor Inspection Office indicated that the contractor may not have strictly complied with safety regulations during hot work operations. In particular, insufficient fire isolation measures had been implemented around the welding area, and no adequate shielding had been provided to protect lower levels. Ventilation in the basement was poor, and combustible materials had been stored in an unsafe manner.

Experts suggested that several factors contributed to the rapid spread of the fire. Large quantities of packaging materials inside the building provided abundant fuel, while vertical openings within the structure created a "chimney effect", allowing flames and smoke to spread rapidly upward. Evidence also indicated that some fire doors may not have been closed in time, reducing the effectiveness of fire containment measures.

== Response ==
After the fire broke out, the Taichung City Fire Bureau dispatched 40 fire engines and 107 firefighters to the scene at 1:24 p.m. Firefighters adopted a multi-directional firefighting strategy and used ladder trucksto extinguish the blaze from above. After approximately six hours of rescue operations, the fire was brought under control and several trapped individuals were rescued.

Following the fire, the Taichung City Government ordered work at the construction site to be suspended and demanded improvements in fire prevention and safety management. The Taichung District Prosecutors Office assigned prosecutors and forensic personnel to examine the deceased and launched an investigation into the cause of the fire, treating the case as one involving negligent homicide.

After an investigation, the Taichung City Urban Development Bureaudetermined that the contractors and supervising architects had failed to fulfill their construction management and supervisory responsibilities, allegedly violating the Building Act, the Construction Industry Act, and the Architects Act. The bureau imposed the maximum fine of NT$90,000 on both the construction contractor and the supervising architect and referred them to the Construction Industry Review Committee and the Architects Disciplinary Committee, respectively.

== Casualties ==
The fire resulted in nine deaths, including seven Taiwanese nationals and two Vietnamese migrant workers. Most victims died from inhalation of high-temperature smoke and severe burns. One Vietnamese worker died from traumatic shock after jumping from the building in an attempt to escape. Seven others, all construction workers or related personnel present at the site, were injured and transported to hospitals for treatment.

Large amounts of smoke generated by the fire severely affected air quality in surrounding areas. Monitoring data showed a significant increase in PM2.5 concentrations. Nearby schools suspended outdoor activities, and local authorities advised residents to remain indoors and reduce unnecessary travel to minimize health risks.

== Criminal investigation ==
In December 2025, the Taichung District Prosecutors Officestated that flammable polystyrene boards had been installed inside the warehouse without adequate fire prevention facilities or related safety controls. The resulting fire caused nine deaths. Fourteen supervisors and engineering personnel from PX Mart, Hu Yi Construction, Taiwan Shinling, and other companies were indicted on charges including negligent homicide and violations of the Occupational Safety and Health Act.

== Reactions ==
=== Mainland China ===
Zhu Fenglian, spokesperson for the Taiwan Affairs Office of the Central Committee of the Chinese Communist Party and the Taiwan Affairs Office of the State Council, expressed condolences to the victims and sympathy to their families and the injured.
