= Yang Ma Tower =

Residential skyscraper in Taichung, Taiwan

Yang Ma Tower 白朗峰
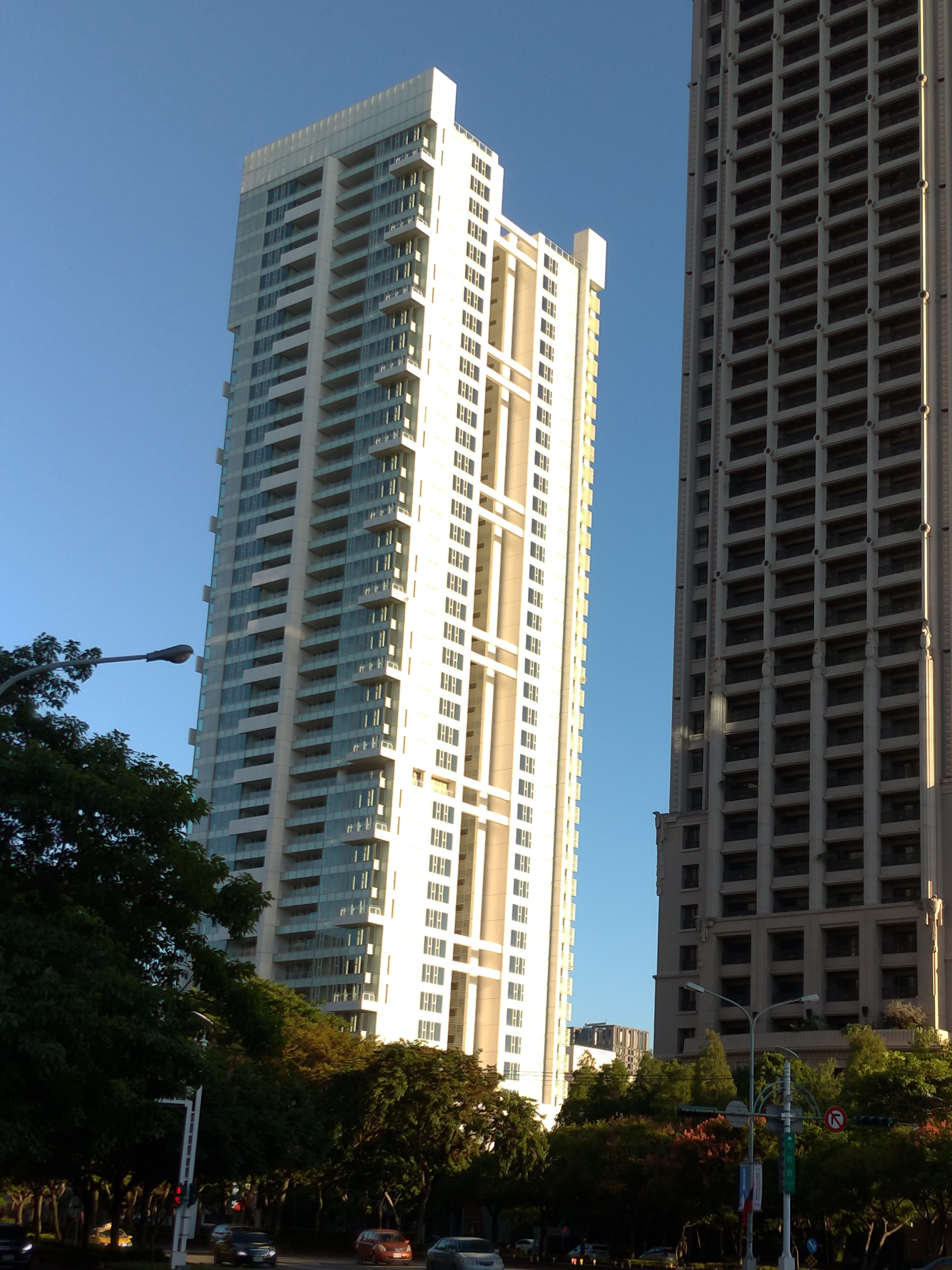
- Interactive map of the Yang Ma Tower 白朗峰 area

General information
- Status: Completed
- Type: Residential
- Location: Xitun District, Taichung, Taiwan
- Coordinates: 24°09′18″N 120°38′44″E
- Construction started: 2014
- Completed: 2019

Height
- Architectural: 163.8 m (537 ft)

Technical details
- Floor count: 41 above ground 6 below ground
- Floor area: 68,501 m^{2} (737,340 sq ft)

Design and construction
- Architect: Richard Meier

The Yang Ma Tower, formerly known as Taichung Condominium Tower (Chinese: 白朗峰), is a 41-story, 163.8 m (537 ft) tall residential skyscraper located in Xitun District, Taichung, Taiwan. The building has a total floor area of 68,501 m^{2} (737,340 sq ft), and it comprises six basement levels. Construction of the skyscraper began in 2014 and it was completed in 2019. As of December 2020, it is the second tallest residential skyscraper in Taichung, the 8th tallest building in Taichung and 28th tallest in Taiwan.

== Design ==
The tower is jointly designed by the American architectural firm Richard Meier & Partners and HOY Architects. The building is divided into two north–south towers, connected through a central core area. The main façade structure of the South Tower is a white translucent glass curtain wall, which allows natural light to enter the building and also allows residents to maintain privacy. There is a public sky garden on the 16th floor of the North Tower, which serves as a viewing platform.

== See also ==
- List of tallest buildings in Taiwan
- List of tallest buildings in Taichung
- Taichung's 7th Redevelopment Zone
- 55 Timeless
