= Floating ecopolis =

Amphibious city model

The Floating ecopolis, otherwise known as the Lilypad, is a model designed by Belgian architect Vincent Callebaut for future climatic refugees. He proposed this model as a long-term solution to rising water level as per the GIEC (Intergovernmental group on the evolution of the climate) forecast. It is a self-sufficient amphibious city and satisfies the four challenges laid down by the OECD (Organisation for Economic Co-operation and Development) in March 2008 namely, climate, biodiversity, water and health.

== Architect ==
Vincent Callebaut is a Belgian architect known for his eco-friendly projects. He has received many awards. Some of the recent ones include:

- First Prize Winner in Taipei, Taiwan, for his Luxurious Residential Tower (2010)
- First Prize Winner in Royat, France for his Thermal Swimming Pool (2009)

== Design ==
The floating structure has a capacity to shelter 50,000 individuals. It consists of three marinas and three "mountains", which are meant for entertainment purposes, surrounding a centrally located artificial lagoon that performs the task of collecting and purifying water. The shape of this floating structure was inspired from the highly ribbed leaf of the Amazonia Victoria Regia water lily. The double skin of this structure would be made of polyester fibers covered by a layer of titanium dioxide (TiO_{2}). The titanium oxide reacts with ultraviolet rays and therefore, due to photocatalytic effect, it absorbs atmospheric pollution in the process.

== Energy ==
By only using renewable energies, this design has zero carbon emission and it produces more energy than it consumes. Energy sources could include:

- Biomass
- Osmotic power
- Phytopurification
- Solar thermal
- Solar photovoltaic
- Tidal power
- Wind energy

== See also ==
- Seasteading
- Vertical farm
