= Matsusei =

Defunct grocery store chain of Taiwan

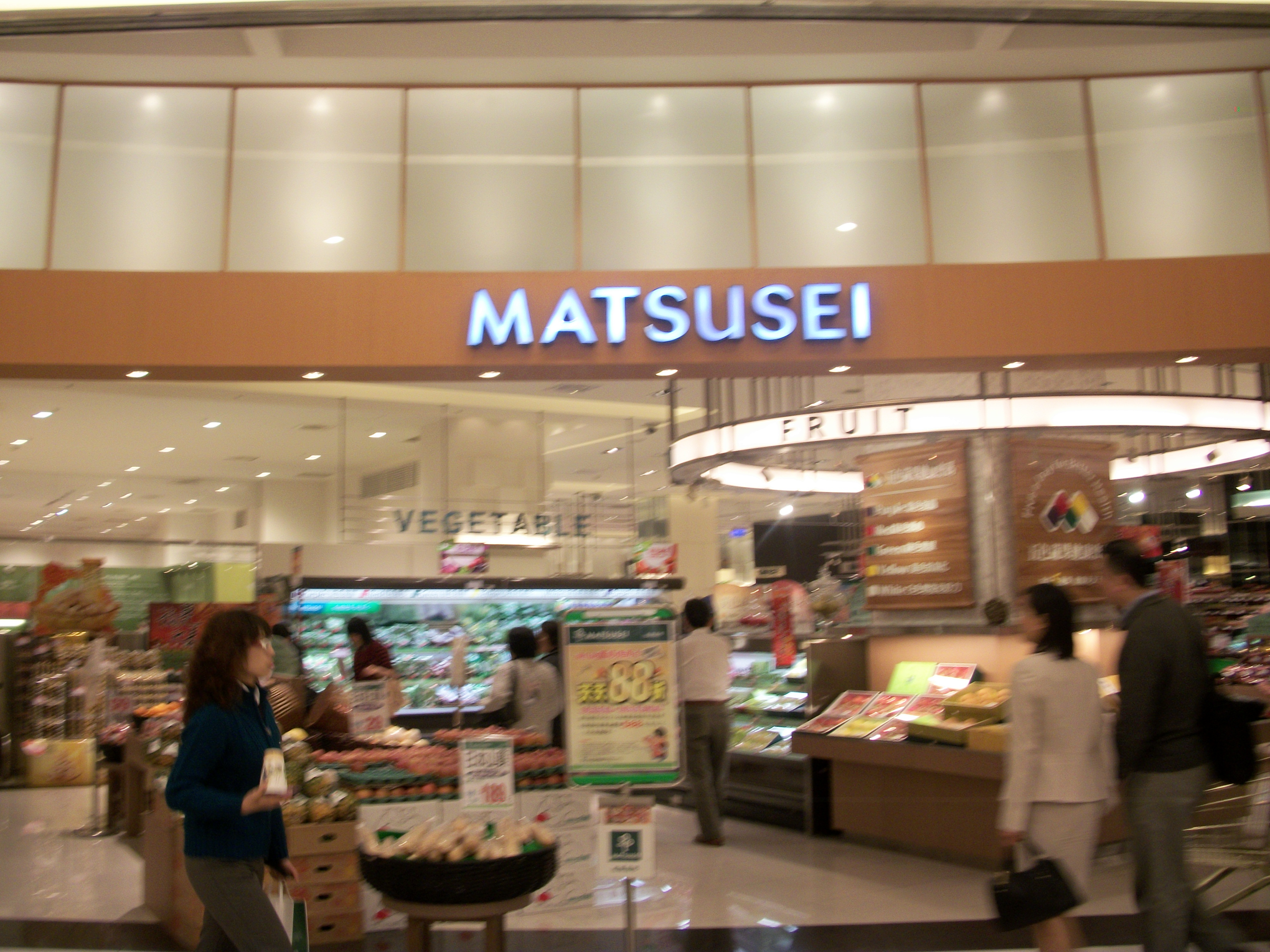

Sung Ching Commercial Co., Ltd (Chinese: 松青商業股份有限公司; pinyin: Sōngqīng Shāngyè Gǔfènyǒuxiàngōngsī), doing business as Matsusei Supermarket (Chinese: 松青超市; pinyin: Sōngqīng Chāoshì) was a grocery store chain in Taiwan. The company head office was in Xizhi District, New Taipei City.

As of 2004, Matsusei had 80 stores. On Saturday May 22, 2004 it opened a luxury store in Tianmu, Shilin District, Taipei. Unlike other Matsusei stores, this one had "Matsusei" in Roman characters at the entrance instead of Chinese characters. Matsusei owned the Marukyu (丸久) supermarket brand. In 2015, the company was sold to PX Mart.
