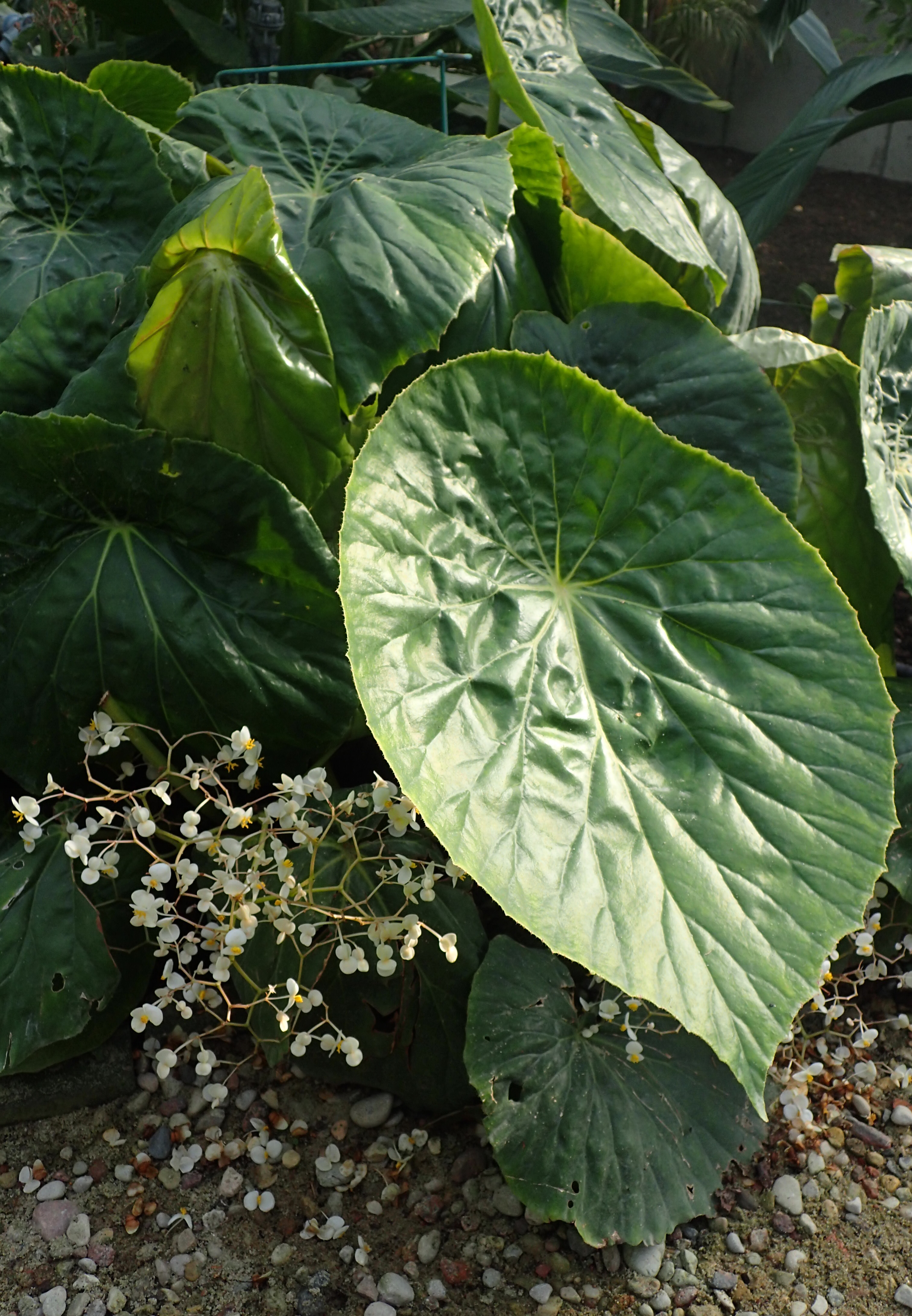

Scientific classification
- Kingdom: Plantae
- Clade: Tracheophytes
- Clade: Angiosperms
- Clade: Eudicots
- Clade: Rosids
- Order: Cucurbitales
- Family: Begoniaceae
- Genus: Begonia
- Species: B. nelumbiifolia

Binomial name
- Begonia nelumbiifolia Cham. & Schltdl.

= Begonia nelumbiifolia =

Species of flowering plant

Begonia nelumbiifolia, the lilypad begonia, is a species of flowering plant in the family Begoniaceae.
