= Cloud Top =

Residential twin skyscrapers in Xinyi District of Taipei, Taiwan

Cloud Top 雲頂
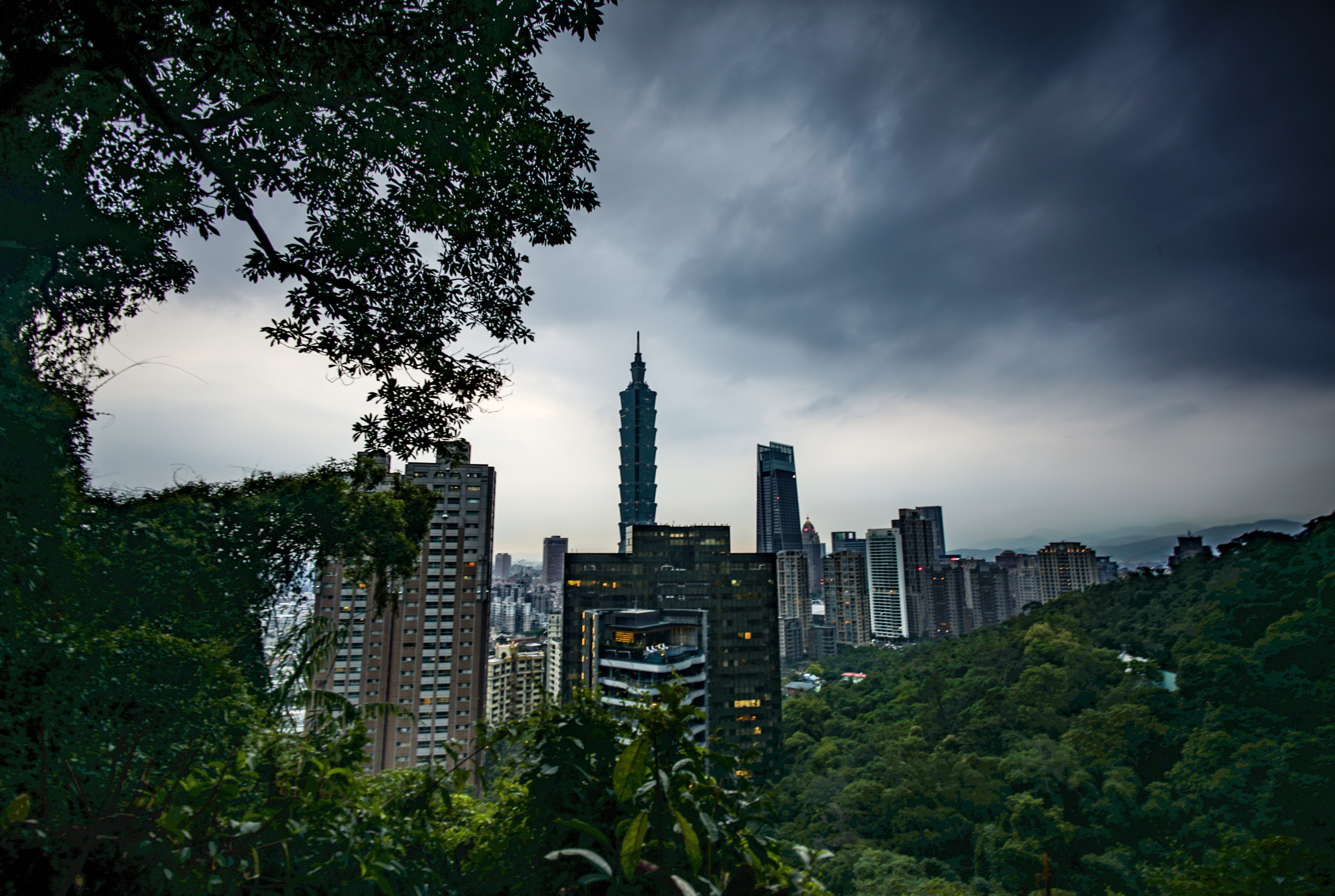
- Twin buildings on the left
- Interactive map of the Cloud Top 雲頂 area

General information
- Status: Completed
- Type: Residences
- Location: No. 8, Lane 150, Section 5, Xinyi Road, Xinyi District, Taipei, Taiwan
- Coordinates: 25.02804606942309°N 121.57084476792055°E
- Completed: 1997

Height
- Tip: 361 ft (110 m)

Technical details
- Floor count: 30 above ground 6 below ground

Cloud Top (Chinese: 雲頂; pinyin: Yúndǐng) is a 30-story, 361 ft (110 m) tall residential twin skyscraper complex located in Xinyi Special District, Taipei, Taiwan. The complex used to be the tallest residential skyscrapers in Taipei when completed in 1997. Built under strict requirements of preventing damage caused by earthquakes and typhoons common on the island, the residential complex provides 195 units of luxury apartments, offering unobstructed views of Taipei 101 and Xinyi District.

== See also ==
- List of tallest buildings in Taipei
- Tao Zhu Yin Yuan
- One Park Taipei
- 55 Timeless
