= Asia Plaza Building =

Skyscraper office building in Zhongzheng District, Taipei, Taiwan

Asia Plaza Building 亞洲廣場大樓
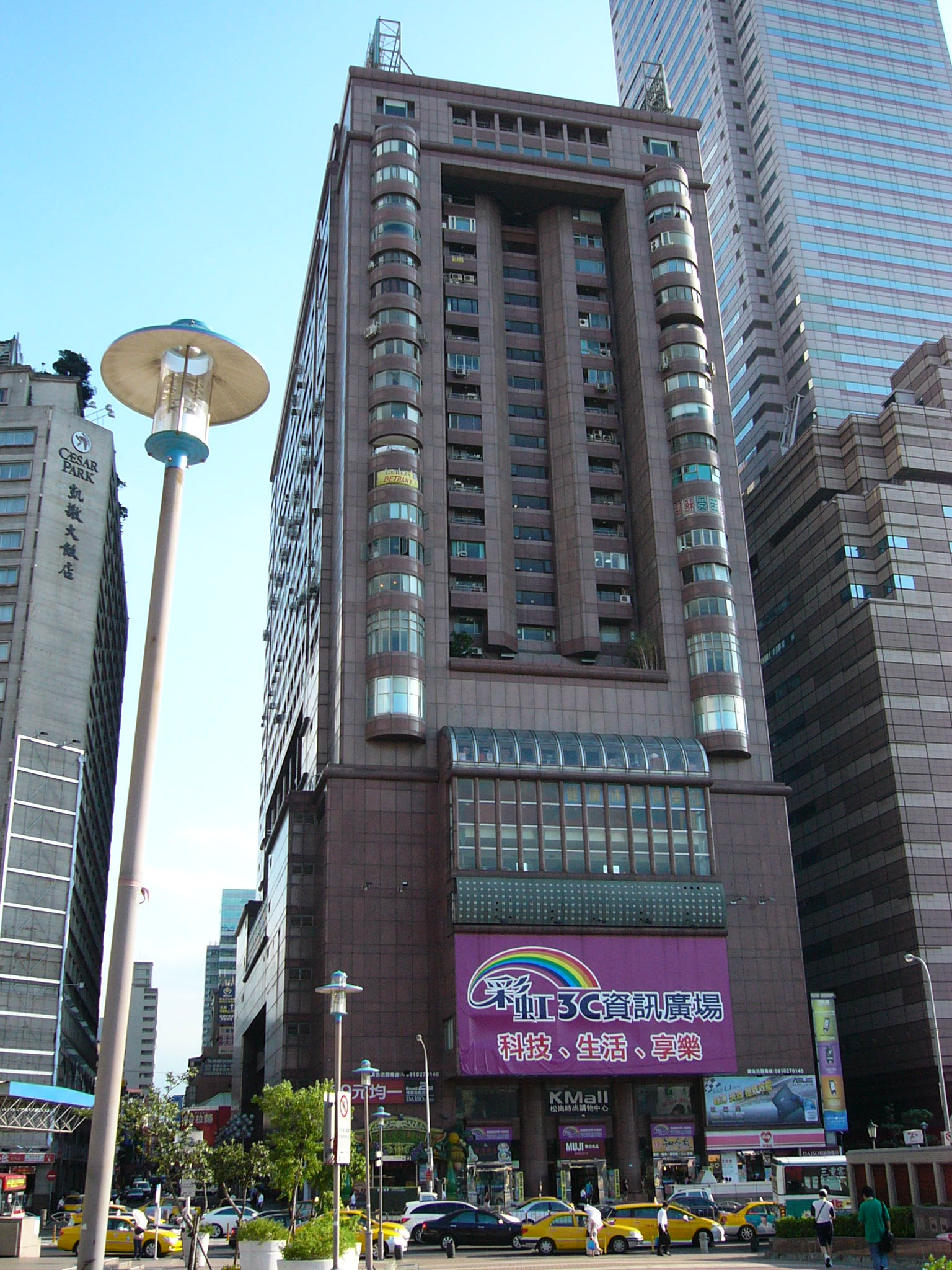
- Interactive map of the Asia Plaza Building 亞洲廣場大樓 area

General information
- Status: Completed
- Type: Office building
- Classification: Office
- Location: No. 50, Section 1, Zhongxiao West Road, Zhongzheng District, Taipei, Taiwan
- Coordinates: 25°02′46″N 121°30′57″E
- Completed: 1990

Height
- Roof: 101 m (331 ft)

Technical details
- Floor count: 27

Design and construction
- Architect: Chu-Yuan Lee

The Asia Plaza Building (Chinese: 亞洲廣場大樓) is a 27-story, 101 m (331 ft) skyscraper office building located in Zhongzheng District, Taipei, Taiwan. The building was designed by Taiwanese architect Chu-Yuan Lee. When the building was completed in 1990, it was the tallest in West Taipei, but was surpassed by Shin Kong Life Tower in 1993. The higher floors of the building house offices, hotels, a gym and a cram school, whilst the lower floors of the building house a department store.

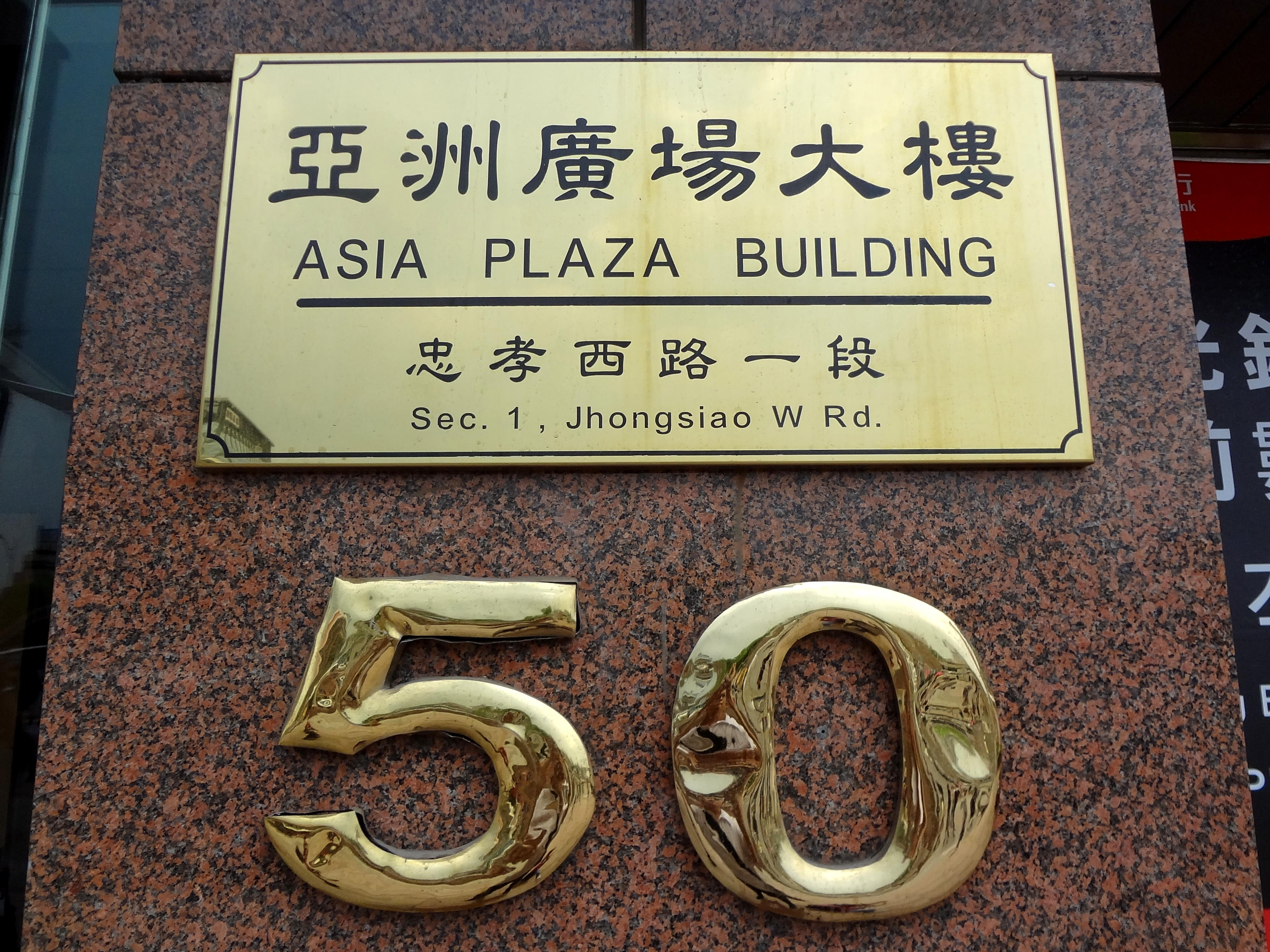
Building sign

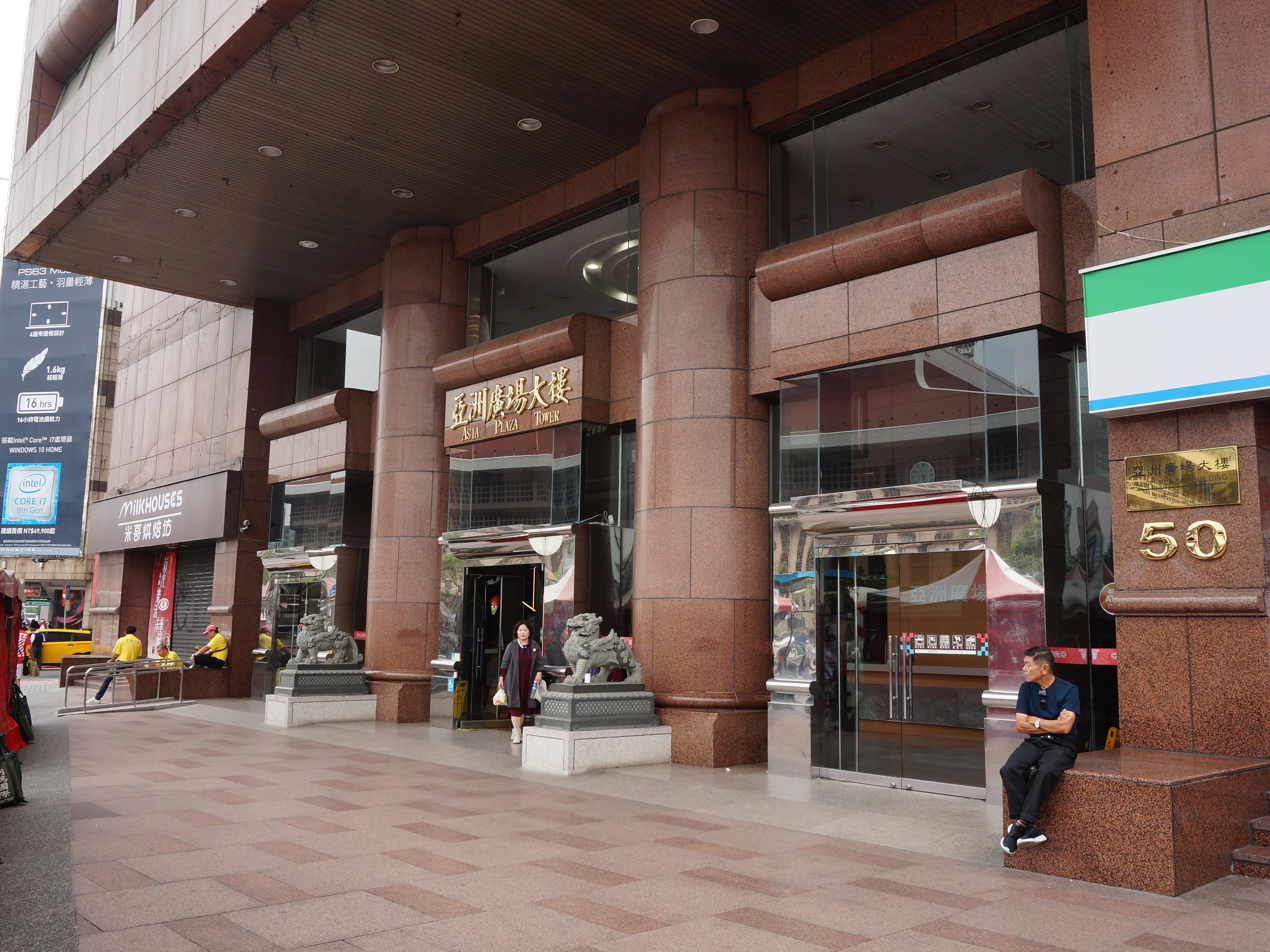
Main Entrance

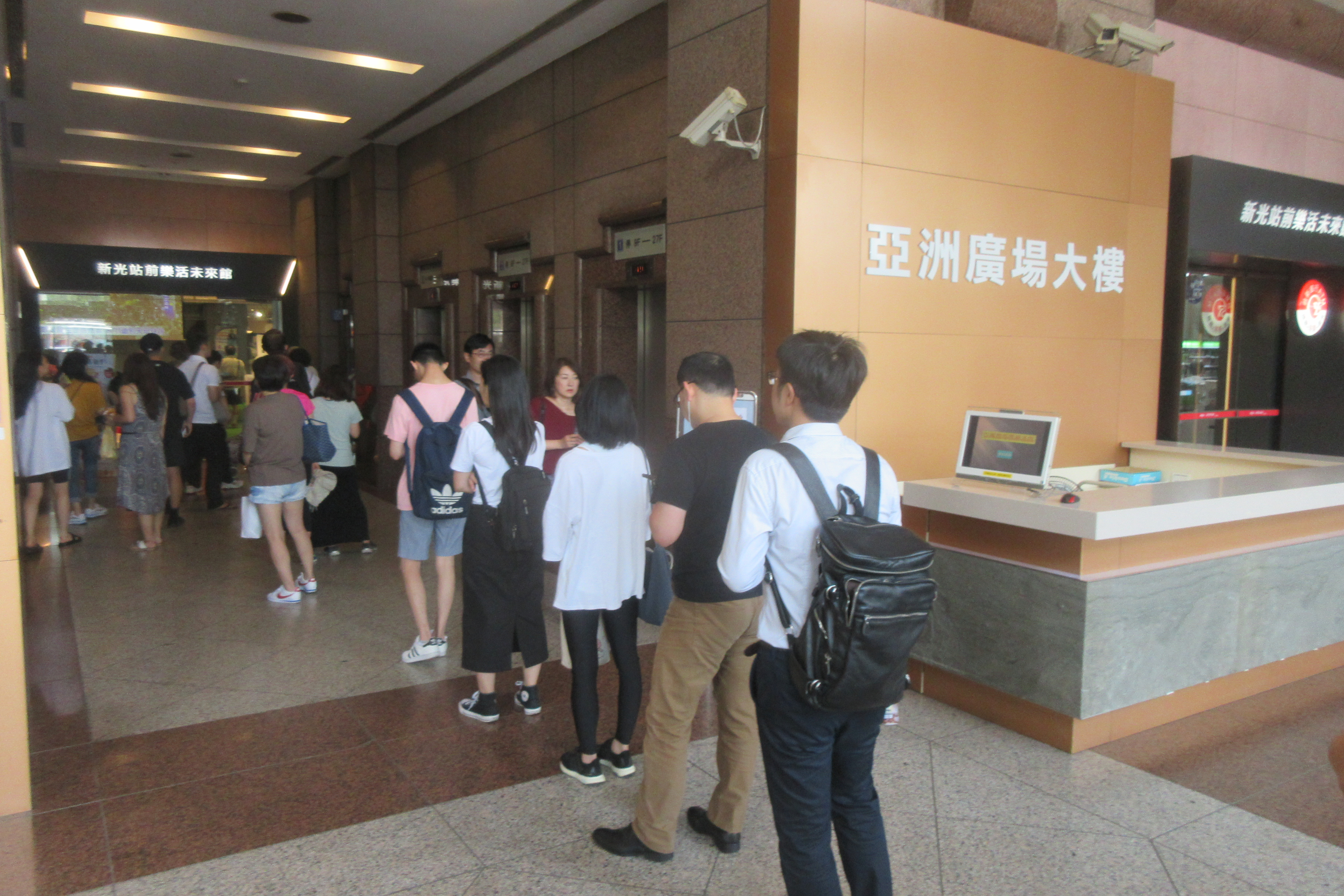
Lobby

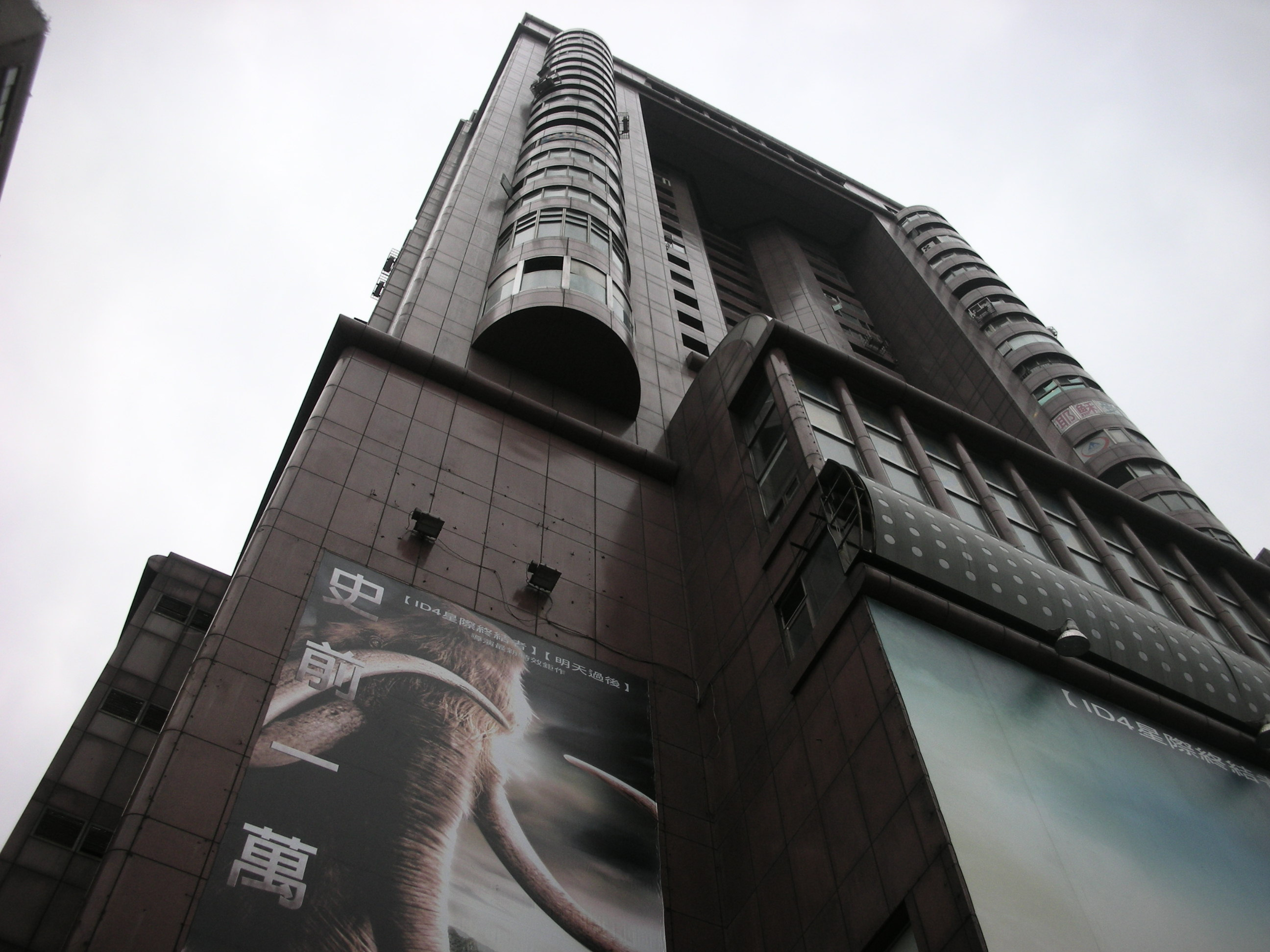

== See also ==
- List of tallest buildings in Taiwan
- List of tallest buildings in Taipei
- Taipei Century Plaza
