= Tao Zhu Yin Yuan =

Residential building in Taipei, Taiwan

- 陶朱隱園

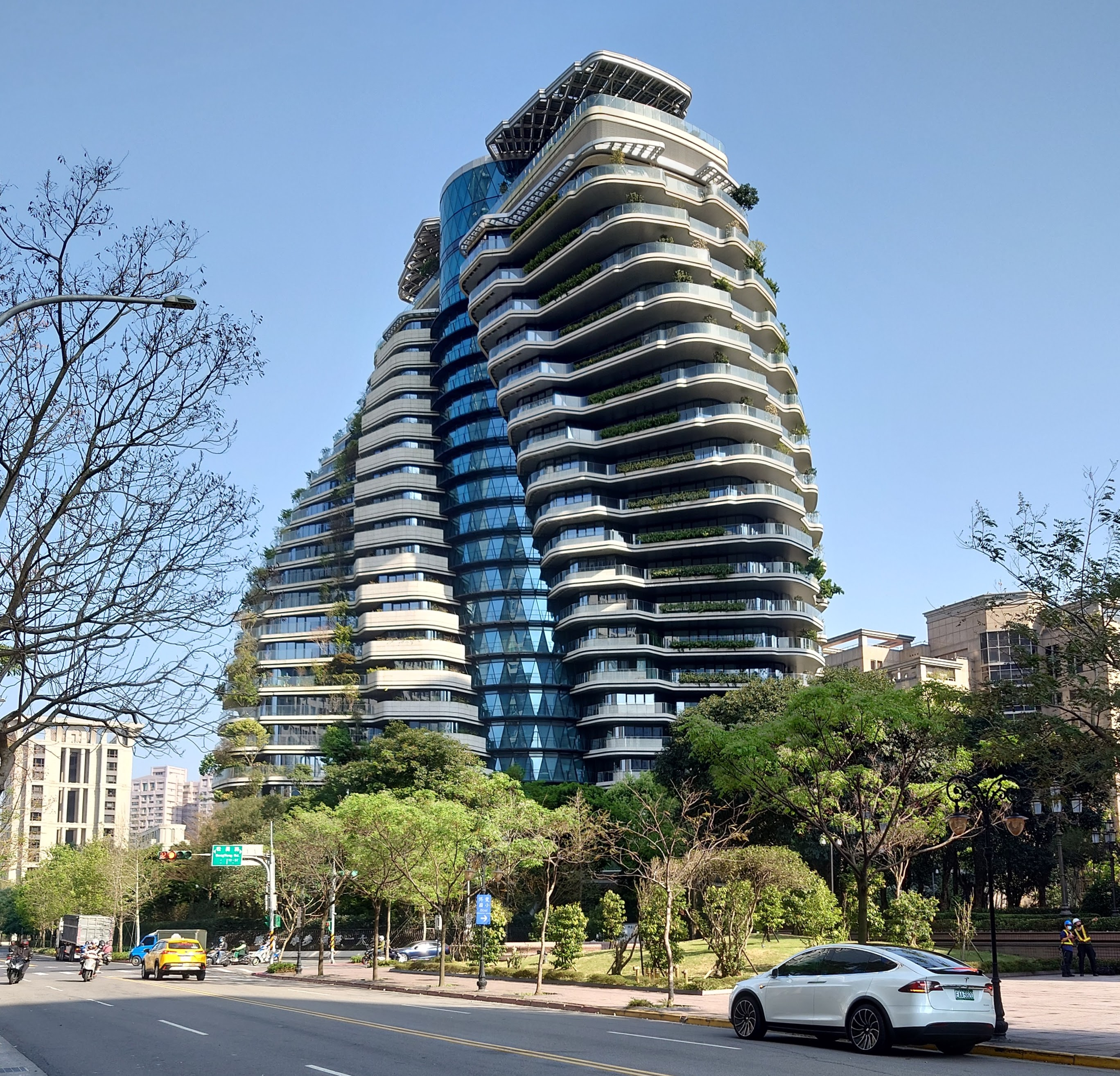
- Interactive map of the Tao Zhu Yin Yuan area

General information
- Status: Completed
- Type: Residential
- Location: Songyong Road, Xinyi District, Taipei, Taiwan
- Coordinates: 25°2′18.96″N 121°34′13.44″E
- Construction started: 2013
- Completed: 2018

Height
- Roof: 93.2 m (306 ft)

Technical details
- Floor count: 21
- Floor area: 42,335 m^{2} (455,690 sq ft)
- Lifts/elevators: 7

Design and construction
- Architect: Vincent Callebaut

The Tao Zhu Yin Yuan, also known as Agora Garden (Chinese: 陶朱隱園; pinyin: Táo zhū yǐn yuán), is a residential high-rise building located in Xinyi Special District, Xinyi District, Taipei, Taiwan. The building has an architectural height of 93.2 m (306 ft) with 21 floors above ground and four basement levels, with a floor area of 42,335 m^{2} (455,690 sq ft). The tower was designed by the Belgian architect Vincent Callebaut and was completed in 2018. The building has received a LEED Gold energy label as well as a Diamond level awarded by the Low Carbon Building Alliance.

== Design ==
The residential building has a special appearance and is a rare twisting building, which is modeled after a DNA strand in the form of a double helix progressing 90 degrees from top to bottom, with each floor offset 4.5 degrees from the previous. There is also a helipad located on the top floor. There are seven elevators inside, one of which can carry supercars and ambulances. The building is covered in approximately 20,000 trees and shrubs, which is aimed to reduce the carbon footprint of Taipei by absorbing around 130 tonnes of carbon dioxide emissions each year.

== Awards ==
- CTBUH Award 2015: Innovation Award 2015 Award of Excellence
- German Design Award 2018: Excellent Communications Design Architecture

== Gallery ==
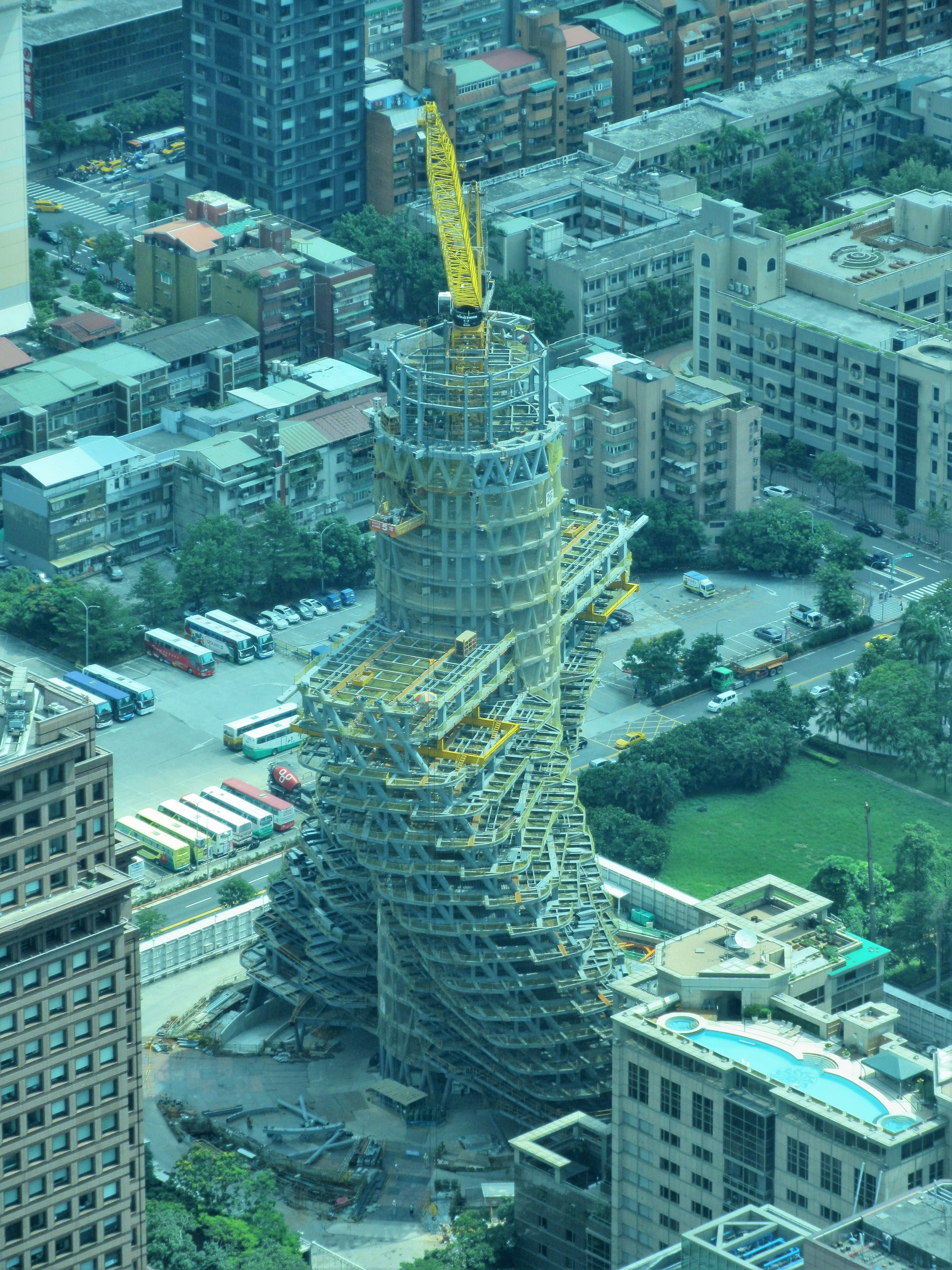
August 2016

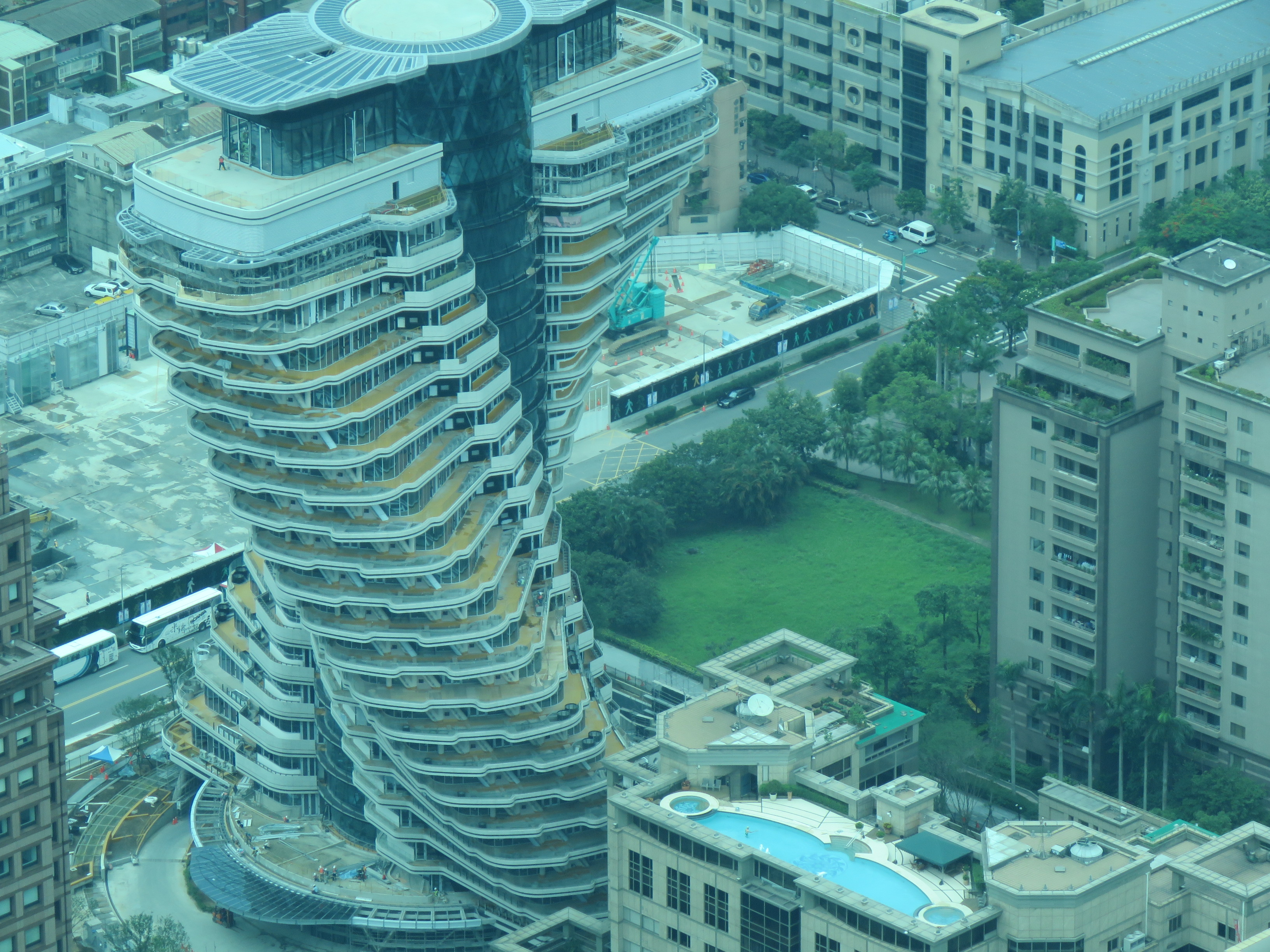
January 2017

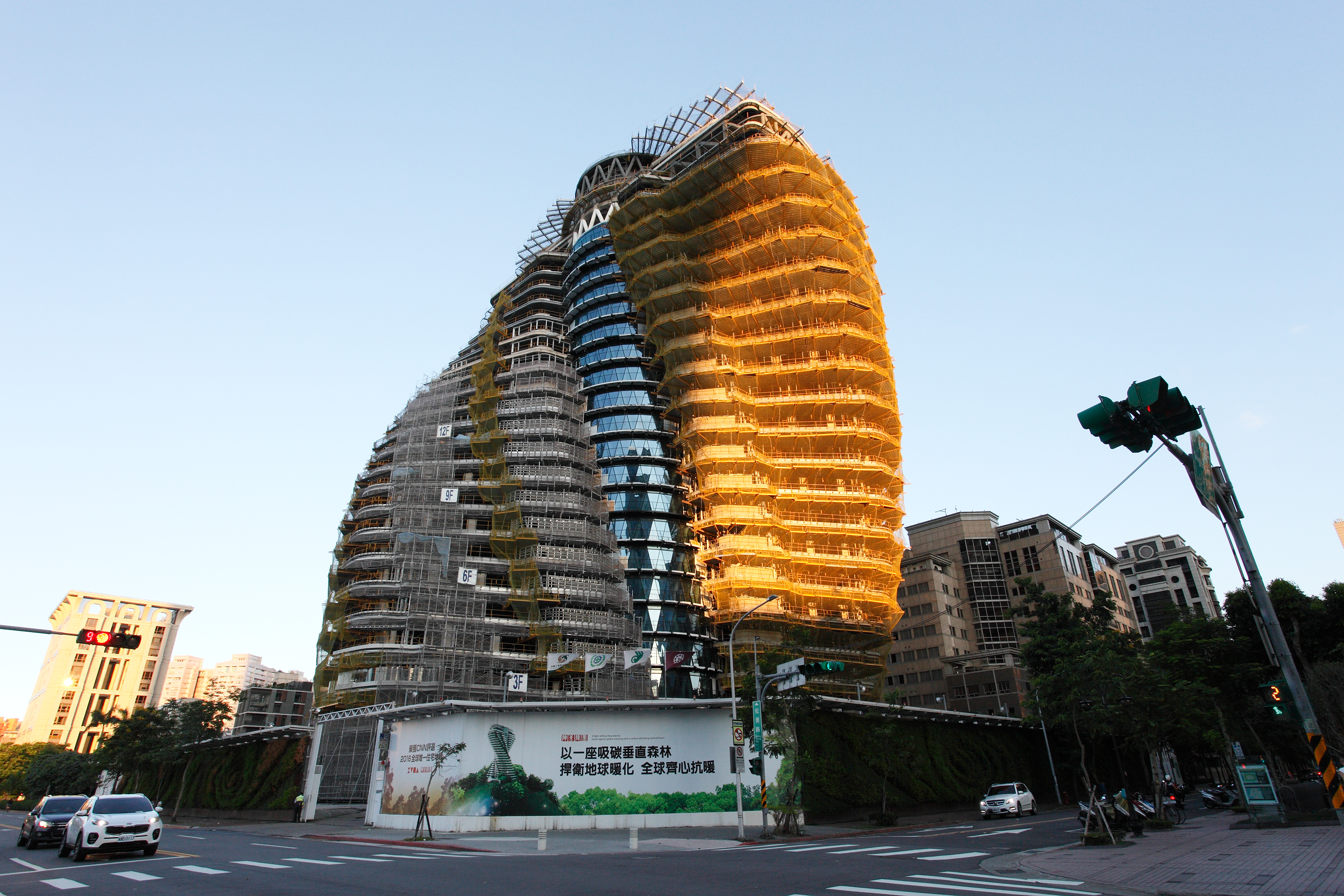
July 2017

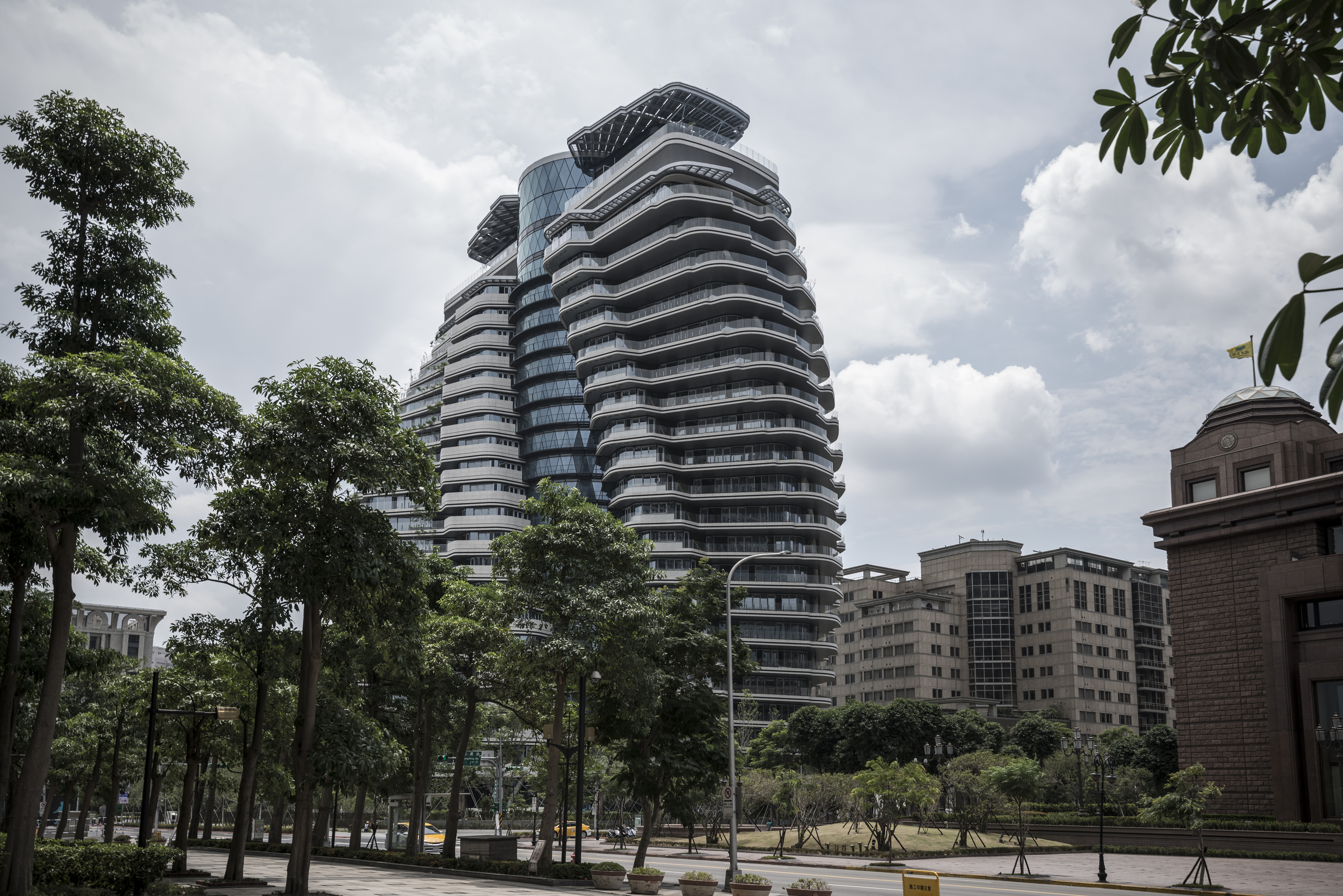
August 2018

== See also ==
- List of tallest buildings in Taipei
- Vincent Callebaut
- Polaris Garden
- 55 Timeless
- Kingdom of Global View

== External List ==
- Official Website of Tao Zhu Yin Yuan
