= Vincent Callebaut =

Belgian ecological architect

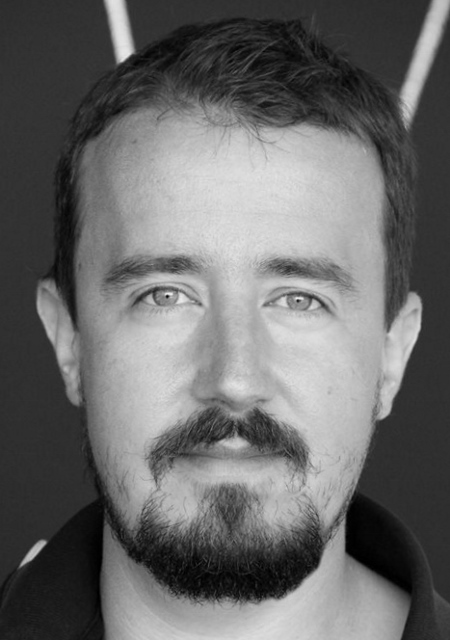
- Born: May 27, 1977; La Louvière, Belgium
- Education: Université libre de Bruxelles
- Occupation: Architect
- Awards: Prix Godecharle (2001), International Architecture Awards (2014)
- Buildings: Agora Garden Taipei
- Projects: Dragonfly, Lilypad, King Forest

Vincent Callebaut (born May 27, 1977) is a Belgian ecological architect. Callebaut specialises in futuristic ecodistrict projects which focus on sustainability issues such as renewable energies, biodiversity, and urban agriculture.

== Biography ==
Vincent Callebaut was born in 1977 in Belgium. He graduated from the Institute of Victor Horta in 2000 and moved to Paris for an internship with architects Odile Decq and Massimiliano Fuksas. After completing this internship, Callebaut founded his own company called Vincent Callebaut Architectures.

== Virtual projects ==
=== Dragonfly ===
The 'Dragonfly project' is a design project created to promote implementation of mixed use vertical farm towers in Manhattan, specifically at the south edge of Roosevelt Island along the East River. Callebaut envisions these towers as allowing for a traditional commercial and residential space to exist alongside large-scale vertical farms. These farms would serve as community gardens, allowing local residents to grow their own produce. Callebaut states that his vision of the project is to allow one to be 'eating an apple that just got picked out of a collective orchard in the fourth floor while looking at New York City through the window and then back to your office just in the upper floor.' The concept behind the project was inspired by the Japanese animated movie "Laputa: Castle in the Sky".

The main structure of the towers were planned to be 575 metres (1,886 ft) high, 600 metres (2,000 ft) wide, and constructed in a shape resembling folded dragonfly wings (the project's namesake). The centre of the towers would host a large 'bio-climatic' vertical garden. Residential and commercial space in the towers would be organized along the periphery of each 'wing' to create a frame for the vertical garden to stretch between. The garden would be enclosed in glass to further resemble two crystalline wings made out of glass and steel. These glass panels would be constructed in a honeycomb pattern to allow for maximum sunlight within the complex. Callebaut presents the Dragonfly project as a means of reconnecting urban consumers with food producers, intending for the production of vegetables, fields, production of meat, milk, poultry, and eggs over 132 floors of the towers extending vertically.

The Dragonfly towers are designed to accommodate 28 different self-sufficient agricultural fields. Bio-fertilizing would be powered by solar and wind power, and water would be recycled within the building. Ideally, Callebaut envisions that every resource produced within the tower would be recycled in a continuous auto-feeding loop with no material loss. The spaces between the tower's 'wings' would accumulate warm air in the structure during cool weather, minimising expenditure on heating systems throughout the building. During hot weather, the space would be similarly cooled through the processes of natural ventilation, and 'evapo-perspiration' from the plants.

Callebaut lists the objectives of the Dragonfly project as:

- Creating proximity between Manhattan's inhabitants and food productions,
- Reducing intermediaries in the agricultural production model,
- Promoting self-sufficiency in pursuit of ultimate reduction of maintenance expenses.

=== Lilypad ===
The Lilypad, or the Floating ecopolis, is based on the idea of creating a place for future refugees of current sea level rise caused by global warming. The project would be a completely self-sufficient floating city built to accommodate up to 50,000 people.

== Built or under construction ==
=== Tao Zhu Yin Yuan ===
Formerly called "Agora Garden", Vincent Callebaut designed a tower for Taipei promoting vertical construction in an overpopulated city. It is a concept of eco-construction to reduce the carbon footprint of its inhabitants.

Vincent Callebaut Architectures SARL replied to an invitation to tender in November 2010. In 2014, the project was under construction. It was completed in 2018.

The shape of the building looks like a molecule of DNA with its double helix (but in the opposite chirality of most common (known) B-form DNA). This was designed to represent a symbol of life and dynamism. The surface area is about 50,000 square metres (540,000 sq ft).

The aim of the project is to represent a perfect symbiosis between humans and nature. Vincent Callebaut aims to develop an avant-gardist architecture and tries to institute a new lifestyle in harmony with nature. The building is intended to guarantee environmental norms in order to obtain the Green Building Label delivered by the Home Affairs Ministry of Taipei.

The project addresses four ecologic objectives of the Copenhagen Accord:

- Reduction of global warming,
- Protection of biodiversity,
- Protection of the environment and quality of life,
- Management of natural resources and waste.

The Agora Garden concept embraces the Cradle to Cradle philosophy: "nothing is lost and everything transforms itself" (Antoine Lavoisier). All materials are recycled or recyclable in order to imitate the processes of natural ecosystems. At the top of the building, there is a free access garden covered by photovoltaic panels that produce electricity for the building. The tower is surrounded by 20-metre (66 ft) trees, which increase the biodiversity in the city.

Agora Garden was planned as twenty levels in a double helix formation, with a total twist from bottom to the top of ninety degrees. The twist satisfies four major objectives. First, thanks to this architecture, the morphology of the building change according to its orientation: On the East/West side, we can see a rhomboidal pyramid. On the North–South side, we can see a reverse pyramid. Second, all flats have their own balconies looking like a hanging garden. Third, there is no vis-à-vis, so inhabitants have privacy and a panoramic view of Taipei.

The six main components of the project are:

- The forestair: the building is bordered by a forest which ensures the privacy of the inhabitants. The light is over present and the car parks, the swimming pool, and the fitness area are naturally ventilated.
- Indoor and outdoor areas are well-connected credit to all the bay windows.
- The central core is composed of two staircases, four high-speed elevators, a car elevator, and two sky garages.
- The apartments measure 650 square metres (7,000 sq ft). In Taiwan, it is not uncommon for large families of three generations to live together in one flat.
- The landscape balconies project is to build gardens which cover the entire building and, in this way, reintroduce an element of nature to the city. Inhabitants can cultivate fruits, vegetables, and herbs so that they could be self-sufficient. Therefore, these gardens take part in the sustainability process. There are compost spaces to transform waste into organic fertilizers, and reservoirs to collect rainwater.
- At a height of 100 metres (330 ft), a 1,000 square metres (11,000 sq ft) pergola with photovoltaic covering generates electricity for the network of the building.

=== The Gate ===
The Gate Heliopolis is under construction in Cairo, Egypt. It is a multi-use complex of 450,000 square metres (4,843,759.69 sq feet) with housing, workspaces, and sports facilities with a rooftop garden.
