= 55 Timeless =

Residential skyscraper in Xinyi District of Taipei, Taiwan

55 Timeless 琢白
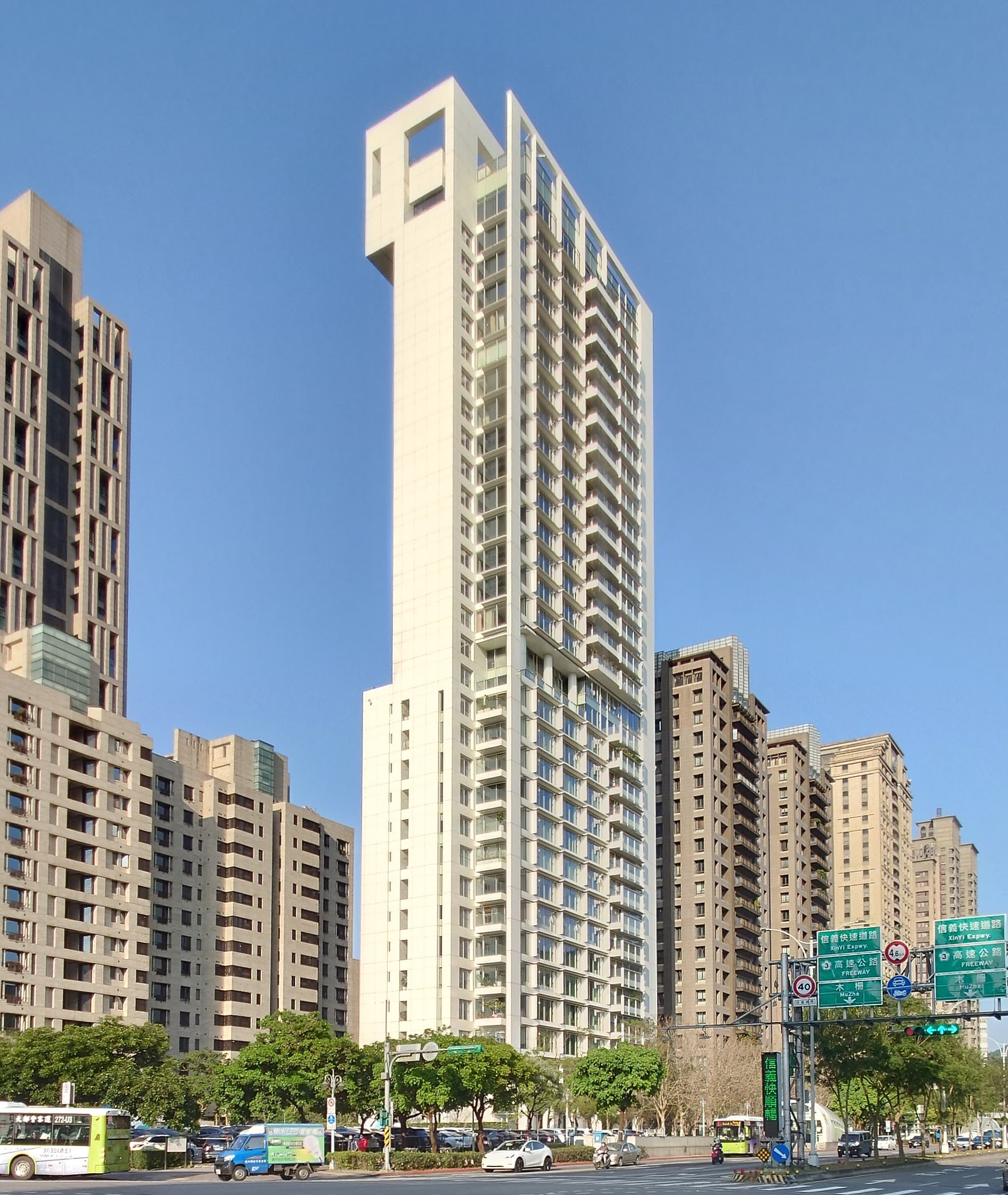
- Interactive map of the 55 Timeless 琢白 area

General information
- Status: Completed
- Type: Residences
- Location: No. 55, Section 5, Xinyi Road, Xinyi District, Taipei, Taiwan
- Coordinates: 25°02′0.1″N 121°35′46.49″E
- Construction started: 2015
- Completed: 2018

Height
- Tip: 127 m (417 ft)

Technical details
- Floor count: 31
- Floor area: 25,931 m^{2} (279,120 sq ft)

Design and construction
- Architects: Richard Meier & Partners

The 55 Timeless, also known as Xin-Yi Residential Tower (Chinese: 琢白; pinyin: Zhuó bái), is a residential skyscraper located in Xinyi District, Taipei, Taiwan. The height of building is 127 m (417 ft), the floor area is 25,931 m^{2} (279,120 sq ft), and it comprises 31 floors above ground, as well as 4 basement levels.

== Design ==
Designed by the American architect Richard Meier, under the requirements of preventing earthquakes and typhoons common in Taiwan, the design was based upon geometric clarity reflected in the building's structural frame organisation. The residential building offers 43 units of apartments, with facilities including an outdoor swimming pool as well as a roof deck situated on the building's top floors, offering views of Taipei 101.

== See also ==
- List of tallest buildings in Taipei
- Tao Zhu Yin Yuan
- Yang Ma Tower
- Cloud Top
- Polaris Garden
