= PX Mart =

Supermarket chain in Taiwan

Chuan Lian Enterprise Co., Ltd.
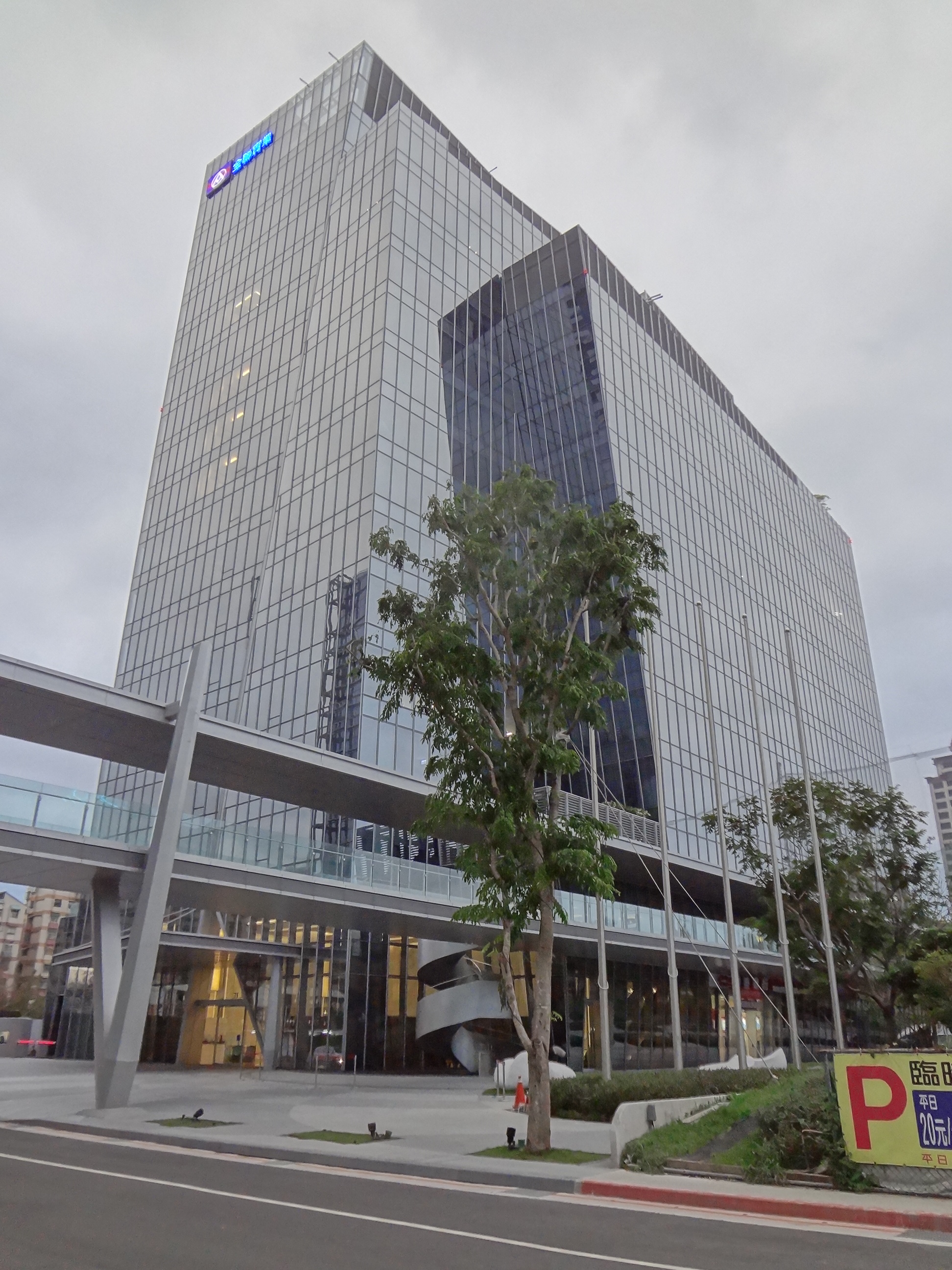
- Native name: 全聯實業股份有限公司
- Industry: Grocery
- Founded: 1 September 1998
- Headquarters: Zhongshan, Taipei, Taiwan
- Key people: Lin Ming-Hsiung (林敏雄)
- Website: http://www.pxmart.com.tw/

PX Mart
- Traditional Chinese: 全聯福利中心
Transcriptions
Standard Mandarin
- Hanyu Pinyin: Quánlián Fúlì Zhōngxīn
- Wade–Giles: Chuanlien Fuli Chunghsin

PX Mart (Chinese: 全聯福利中心) is a supermarket chain in Taiwan. As of early 2026, PX Mart operates 1200+ stores across the island, making it the largest supermarket chain in Taiwan and the second largest retailer by revenue behind 7-Eleven. The corporate headquarters is located in Zhongshan District, Taipei.

== History ==
In 1974, the Ministry of the Interior founded the Jūngōngjiào Fúlì Zhōngxīn (軍公教福利中心), a supermarket with cheaper prices and no sales tax whose access is restricted to military, civil servants, and educators. In 1989, the supermarket was reorganized to create Quánliánshè (全聯社) (Note: Short for Hézuòshè Liánhéshè (合作社聯合社).) that catered to civil servants and educators; the military maintained its own supermarket, which still exists to this day. In 1998, several executives were found to have embezzled money. Nine people were charged, but were all eventually found not guilty. During the controversy, the company was privatized and headed by Lin Ming-Hsiung, founder of Yuanlih Construction (元利建設); its 66 stores were rebranded as PX Mart and were opened to the public.

Under new leadership, Lin aggressively increased their market share through mergers with other chains, acquiring Yanglianshe (楊聯社) in 2004, the stores in Taiwan owned by the Japanese chain Summit (supermarket) in 2006, and the stores operated by Taipei Agricultural Products Marketing Corporation in 2007. The supermarket operated as a discount store and kept consumer prices down through unconventional strategies, such as opening smaller stores in discreet locations or outside urban areas, and not accepting card payments to avoid processing fees. In 2006, PX Mart launched its long-running advertising campaign known as "Mister PX Mart" (全聯先生), which features a man in a deadpan voice describing the chain's lack of extra services to achieve low prices.

In 2012, PX Mart surpassed Carrefour as the largest supermarket chain in Taiwan. The same year, PX Mart opened two warehouses in Guanyin, Taoyuan and Gangshan, Kaohsiung, and became the first overseas member of the All Japan Supermarket Association. In 2013, PX Mart reversed its cash-only policy by allowing card payments from CTBC Bank. PX Mart then acquired two more supermarket chains: Obuying in 2014, and Matsusei in 2015. In 2021, PX Mart announced its acquisition of the hypermarket chain RT-Mart; the deal is awaiting regulatory approval. In 2024, a PX Mart Taichung warehouse fire killed nine people.

== Operations ==
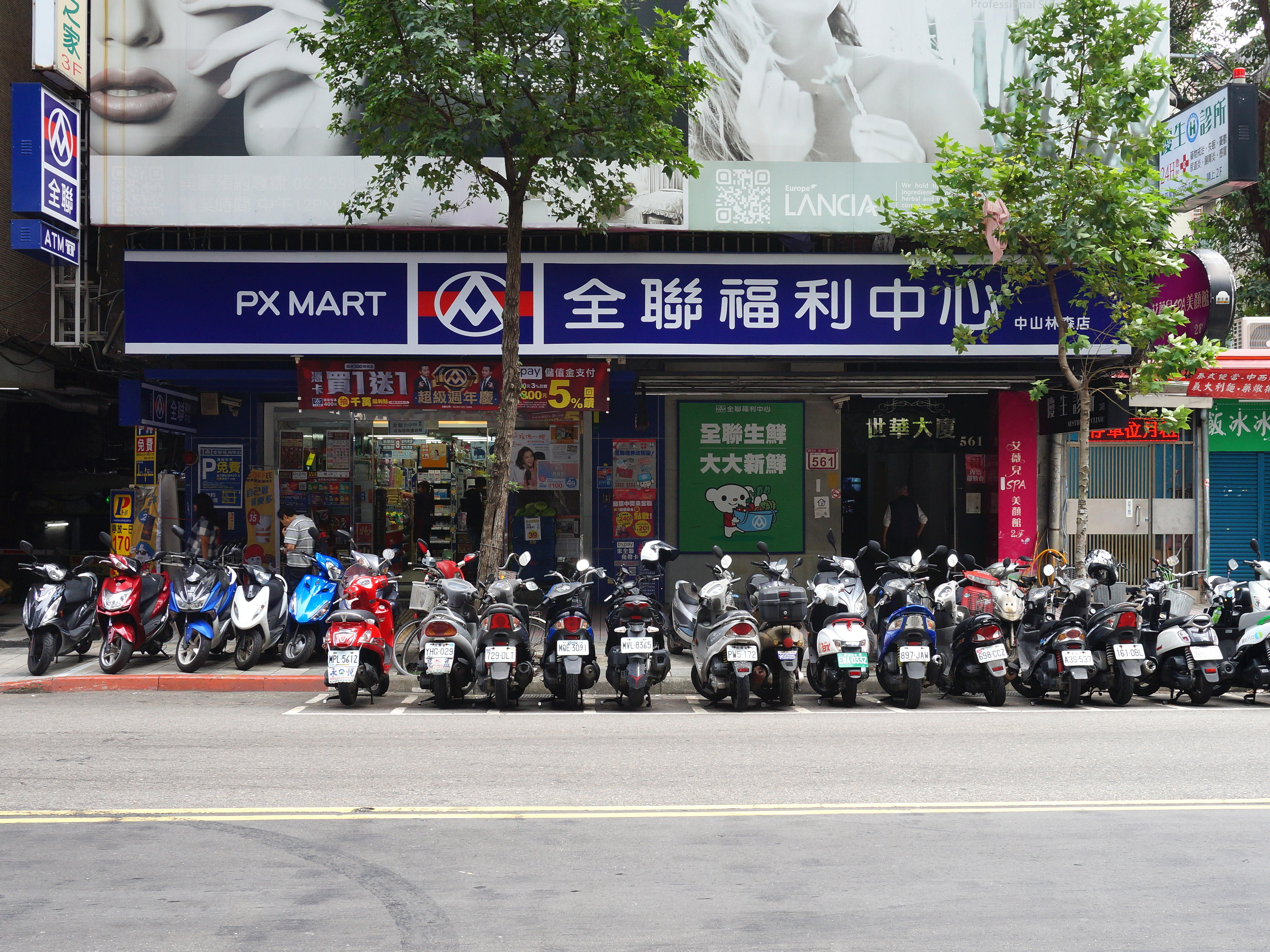
A typical PX Mart store in Taipei.

PX Mart operates three warehouses, located in Guanyin, Taoyuan; Wuqi, Taichung; and Gangshan, Kaohsiung.

== See also ==
- List of supermarket chains in Taiwan
- Post exchange
- List of companies of Taiwan
- Funcom Supermarket
