= Mega PX Mart =

Taiwanese hypermarket chain

- Industry: Grocery
- Founded: 1996
- Headquarters: Zhongshan, Taipei, Taiwan
- Key people: Lin Ming-Hsiung (林敏雄)
- Parent: PX Mart
- Website: https://www.pxmart.com.tw/mega

RT-MART International Ltd.
- Traditional Chinese: 大潤發流通事業股份有限公司
- Simplified Chinese: 大润发流通事业股份有限公司
Transcriptions
Standard Mandarin
- Hanyu Pinyin: Dàrùnfā Liútōng Shìyè Gǔfènyǒuxiàngōngsī

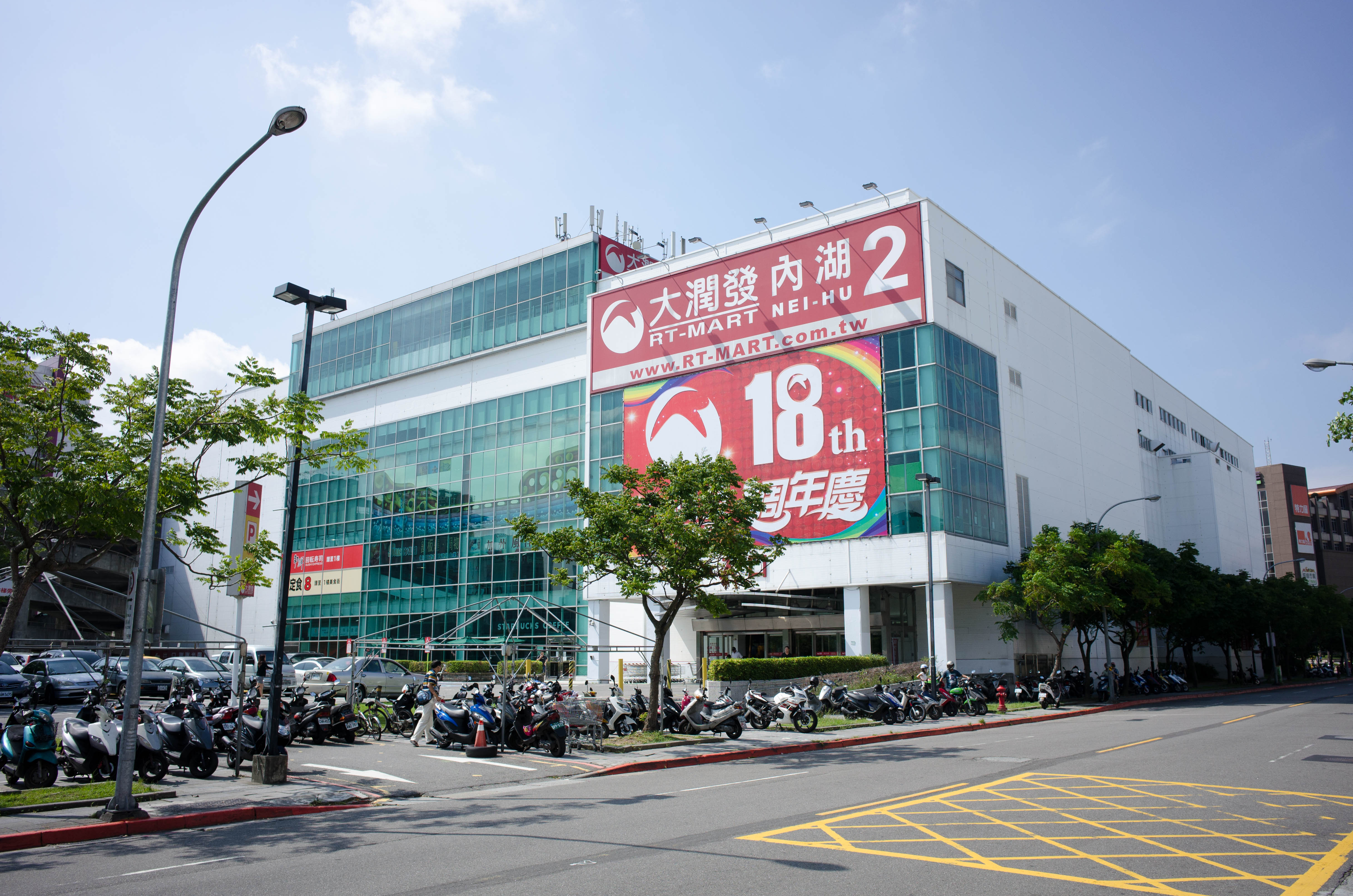
RT-Mart Neihu No. 2 Store, Zhongshan, Taipei

RT-MART International Ltd., trading as Mega PX Mart (traditional Chinese: 大全聯; simplified Chinese: 大全联; pinyin: Dàquánlián) and formerly as RT-Mart (大潤發; 大润发; Dàrùnfā), is a hypermarket chain in Taiwan. Its headquarters is in Zhongshan District, Taipei. The company opened its 23rd store in 2004. RT-Mart and Auchan created a joint venture, Sun Art Retail Group Ltd.

PX Mart acquired equity interests in RT-Mart's distribution business held by Auchan Group and Ruentex Group, will include its own land and buildings, store operation rights and its own brands.
