= List of cinemas in Taiwan =

This is a list of cinemas in Taiwan. All of Taiwan's cinemas are fully digital, with the majority equipped with Dolby Surround 7.1 speakers. Most movies are presented with Traditional Chinese subtitles.

== Currently operational cinemas ==
A list of cinema brands and their locations in alphabetical order.

=== Ambassador Theatres ===
Cinema	Screens/Halls	Seats	District	City	Opening Year	Notes
Ambassador Theatres Taipei	3	1152		Taipei		
Ambassador Theatres Taipei Breeze	6	1491		Taipei		
Ambassador Theatres @ Spring Center	15	1314		Taipei		
Ambassador Theatres Shine Square	8	943	Linkou District	New Taipei	2015	
Ambassador Theatres @ Crown Plaza	13	821		New Taipei		
Ambassador Tamsui	8	888		New Taipei		
Ambassador Zhonghe	7	1368	Zhonghe District	New Taipei	2012	
Ambassador Theatres @ Kwong Fong Plaza	8	1636	Bade District	Taoyuan	2017	
Ambassador Tainan	12	1940		Tainan		
Ambassador Theatres @ E-Da	10	1764	Dashu District	Kaohsiung	2010	
Ambassador Theatres @ SKM Park	10	1856	Cianjhen District	Kaohsiung	2016	
Ambassador Pingtung	6	1135	Pingtung City	Pingtung County	2012	
Ambassador Kinmen	6	638		Kinmen County		

=== Century Asia Cinemas ===
Cinema	Screens/Halls	Seats	District	City	Opening Year	Notes
Century Asia Cinemas Nangang	25			Taipei	2015	
Century Asia Cinemas Yonghe	13		Yonghe District	New Taipei	2019	
Century Asia Cinemas Taoyuan A19	16		Zhongli District	Taoyuan	2021	
Century Asia Cinemas Kaohsiung Main Public Library	14		Cianjhen District	Kaohsiung	2022	

=== In89 Cinemax ===
Cinema	Screens/Halls	Seats	District	City	Opening Year	Notes
in89 Cinemax Taipei Ximen	9	1193	Wanhua District	Taipei	1964	
in89 Cinemax Taoyuan Tonlin	8	448	Taoyuan District	Taoyuan	2017	
in89 Cinemax Taichung Fengyuan	12	532		Taichung	2018	
in89 Cinemax Chiayi InSquare	9	1178		Chiayi	2021	
in89 Cinemax Kaohsiung Pier 2	7	491	Yancheng District	Kaohsiung		
in89 Cinemax Kaohsiung Talee's	11	471	Cianjin District	Kaohsiung	2019	
in89 Cinemax Penghu Everrich	7	566	Magong City	Penghu County	2018	

=== MagongMiranew Cinemas ===
Cinema	Screens/Halls	Seats	District	City	Opening Year	Notes
Miranew Royal Cinemas	8			Taipei	2016	
Miranew Cinemas Danhai	13		Tamsui District	New Taipei	2018	
Miranew Cinemas Honhui	12		Xinzhuang District	New Taipei	2020	
Miranew Cinemas TaiMall	11		Luzhu District	Taoyuan	2018	

=== Shin Kong Cinemas ===
Cinema	Screens/Halls	Seats	District	City	Opening Year	Notes
Shin Kong Cinemas Taipei Lions' Plaza	3	939		Taipei	2013	
Shin Kong Cinemas Taipei Tianmu	8			Taipei	2021	
Shin Kong Cinemas Taoyuan Qingpu	12		Zhongli District	Taoyuan	2020	
Shin Kong Cinemas Taichung Zhonggang	8	2006		Taichung		
Shin Kong Cinemas Tainan Ximen	8			Tainan		

=== Showtime Cinemas ===
Cinema	Screens/Halls	Seats	District	City	Opening Year	Notes
Showtime Cinemas Keelung	8	1033	Xinyi District	Keelung	2007	
Shin Shin Showtime Cinemas	14	1503	Zhongshan District	Taipei	2002	
Showtime Cinemas Today	10	1464		Taipei	2006	
Showtime Cinemas SE Asia	6	405		Taipei	2015	
Showtime Cinemas Banqiao	17	1200	Banqiao District	New Taipei	2013	
Showtime Cinemas Shulin	12	1581	Shulin District	New Taipei	2018	
Showtime Cinemas Tucheng	11	1095	Tucheng District	New Taipei	2018	
Showtime Cinemas Taichung Station	17	2668	East District	Taichung	2017	
Showtime Cinemas Taichung Wenxin	16	2139	Nantun District	Taichung	2018	
Showtime Cinemas Taichung Lihpao	10	811	Houli District	Taichung	2019	
Showtime Cinemas Beigang	4	284		Yunlin County	2019	
Showtime Cinemas Chiayi	11	1408	West District	Chiayi	2016	
Showtime Cinemas Tainan Rende	6	433		Tainan	2021	
Showtime Cinemas Kaohsiung Gangshan	13	1428	Gangshan District	Kaohsiung	2021	
Showtime Cinemas Kaohsiung Dream Mall	12	1856	Cianjhen District	Kaohsiung	2023	
Showtime Cinemas Hualien	9	1230	Hualien City	Hualien County	2019	
Showtime Cinemas Taitung	8	882	Taitung City	Taitung County	2013	

=== Vieshow Cinemas ===
Cinema	Screens/Halls	Seats	District	City	Opening Year	Notes
Vieshow Cinemas Xinyi	15		Xinyi District	Taipei	1998	
Vieshow Cinemas Taipei Qsquare	9		Datong District	Taipei	2009	
MUVIE CINEMAS			Xinyi District	Taipei	2020	
Vieshow Cinemas Banqiao Mega City	9		Banqiao District	New Taipei	2012	
Vieshow Cinemas Global Mall Zhonghe	10		Zhonghe District	New Taipei	2005	
Vieshow Cinemas Linkou Mitsui Outlet Park	9		Linkou District	New Taipei	2016	
Vieshow Cinemas Yes!Life Mall	14		Xindian District	New Taipei	2023	
Vieshow Cinemas Tonlin Plaza	20		Taoyuan District	Taoyuan	2017	
Vieshow Cinemas Hsinchu FE21	11			Hsinchu City		
Vieshow Cinemas Big City	8		East District	Hsinchu City	2012	
Vieshow Cinemas Shang Shun Mall	8		Toufen City	Miaoli County	2015	
Vieshow Cinemas Top City	7		Xitun District	Taichung		
Vieshow Cinemas Tiger City	10		Xitun District	Taichung		
Vieshow Cinemas Taroko Mall	9		East District	Taichung	2001	
Vieshow Cinemas Tainan FE21	9		West Central District	Tainan		
Vieshow Cinemas Focus Square	9		West Central District	Tainan	2000	
Vieshow Cinemas T.S. Mall	15		East District	Tainan	2015	
Vieshow Cinemas Kaohsiung FE21	16		Lingya District	Kaohsiung		
Vieshow Cinemas New Paradiso	5		Ji'an Township	Hualien County	2019	
