= Showtime Cinemas =

Taiwanese movie-theatre chain

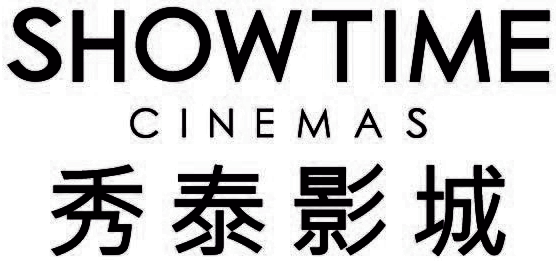
- Company type: Private company
- Industry: media, entertainment
- Founded: 30 June 1999
- Founder: Dezhi Liao
- Headquarters: 8, Lane 91, Section 2, Wuchang Street, Wanhua District, Taipei, Taiwan
- Number of locations: 17
- Area served: Taiwan
- Website: www.showtimes.com.tw

Showtime Cinemas (Chinese: 秀泰影城; pinyin: Xìutài Yǐngchéng) is a Taiwanese cinema chain and the second largest cinema chain in Taiwan. Showtime Cinemas has 17 cinemas and 184 screens in Taiwan currently.

== Business Operations ==
=== Cinemas ===
| Cinema | Screens/Halls | Seats | City | Opening Year |
| Showtime Cinemas Keelung | 8 | 1033 | Keelung | 2007 |
| Shin Shin Showtime Cinemas | 14 | 1503 | Taipei | 2002 |
| Showtime Cinemas Today | 10 | 1464 | Taipei | 2006 |
| Showtime Cinemas SE Asia | 6 | 405 | Taipei | 2015 |
| Showtime Cinemas Banqiao | 17 | 1200 | New Taipei | 2013 |
| Showtime Cinemas Shulin | 12 | 1581 | New Taipei | 2018 |
| Showtime Cinemas Tucheng | 11 | 1095 | New Taipei | 2018 |
| Showtime Cinemas Taichung Station | 17 | 2668 | Taichung | 2017 |
| Showtime Cinemas Taichung Wenxin | 16 | 2139 | Taichung | 2018 |
| Showtime Cinemas Taichung Lihpao | 10 | 811 | Taichung | 2019 |
| Showtime Cinemas Beigang | 4 | 284 | Yunlin County | 2019 |
| Showtime Cinemas Chiayi | 11 | 1408 | Chiayi | 2016 |
| Showtime Cinemas Tainan Rende | 6 | 433 | Tainan | 2021 |
| Showtime Cinemas Kaohsiung Gangshan | 13 | 1428 | Kaohsiung | 2021 |
| Showtime Cinemas Kaohsiung Dream Mall | 12 | 1856 | Kaohsiung | 2023 |
| Showtime Cinemas Hualien | 9 | 1230 | Hualien | 2019 |
| Showtime Cinemas Taitung | 8 | 882 | Taitung | 2013 |

== See also ==
- List of cinemas in Taiwan
- Ambassador Theatres
- Century Asia Cinemas
- In89 Cinemax
- Miranew Cinemas
- Shin Kong Cinemas
- Vieshow Cinemas
