= Miranew Cinemas =

Taiwanese cinema chain

- Company type: Private company
- Industry: media, entertainment
- Founded: 2006
- Headquarters: 5th Floor, No. 780, Beian Road, Zhongshan District, Taipei, Taiwan
- Number of locations: 4
- Area served: Taiwan
- Website: www.miranewcinemas.com

Miranew Cinemas (Chinese: 美麗新影城; pinyin: Měilìxīn Yǐngchéng) is a Taiwanese cinema chain that opened in 2006. As of June 2024, it has 4 cinemas and 40 screens in Taiwan.

== Business Operations ==
=== Cinemas ===
Cinema	Screens/Halls	City	Opening Year
Miranew Royal Cinemas	8	Taipei	2016
Miranew Cinemas Danhai	13	New Taipei	2018
Miranew Cinemas Honhui	12	New Taipei	2020
Miranew Cinemas TaiMall	11	Taoyuan	2018

== See also ==
- List of cinemas in Taiwan
- Ambassador Theatres
- Century Asia Cinemas
- In89 Cinemax
- Showtime Cinemas
- Vieshow Cinemas
- Shin Kong Cinemas
