= Shin Kong Cinemas =

Taiwanese movie-theatre chain

- Company type: Private company
- Industry: media, entertainment
- Founded: 2013
- Headquarters: 4th Floor, No. 36, Xining S. Road, Wanhua District, Taipei, Taiwan
- Number of locations: 5
- Area served: Taiwan
- Website: www.skcinemas.com

Shin Kong Cinemas (Chinese: 新光影城; pinyin: Xīngūang Yǐngchéng) is a Taiwanese cinema chain, with 5 cinemas and 39 screens in Taiwan as of June 2024.

== Business Operations ==
=== Cinemas ===
Cinema	Screens/Halls	Seats	City	Opening Year
Shin Kong Cinemas Taipei Lions' Plaza	3	939	Taipei	2013
Shin Kong Cinemas Taipei Tianmu	8		Taipei	2021
Shin Kong Cinemas Taoyuan Qingpu	12		Taoyuan	2020
Shin Kong Cinemas Taichung Zhonggang	8	2006	Taichung	
Shin Kong Cinemas Tainan Ximen	8		Tainan	

== See also ==
- List of cinemas in Taiwan
- Ambassador Theatres
- Century Asia Cinemas
- In89 Cinemax
- Miranew Cinemas
- Showtime Cinemas
- Vieshow Cinemas
