= Century Asia Cinemas =

Taiwanese cinema chain

- Company type: Private company
- Industry: media, entertainment
- Founded: 16 December 2015
- Headquarters: 11th Floor, No. 299, Section 7, Zhongxiao E. Road, Nangang District, Taipei, Taiwan
- Number of locations: 4
- Area served: Taiwan
- Website: www.centuryasia.com.tw

Century Asia Cinemas (Chinese: 喜樂時代影城; pinyin: Xǐlè Shídài Yǐngchéng) is a Taiwanese cinema chain that opened in 2015. As of June 2024, it has 4 cinemas and 68 screens in Taiwan.

== Business Operations ==
=== Cinemas ===
Cinema	Screens/Halls	City	Opening Year
Century Asia Cinemas Nangang	25	Taipei	2015
Century Asia Cinemas Yonghe	13	New Taipei	2019
Century Asia Cinemas Taoyuan A19	16	Taoyuan	2021
Century Asia Cinemas Kaohsiung Main Public Library	14	Kaohsiung	2022

== See also ==
- List of cinemas in Taiwan
- Ambassador Theatres
- In89 Cinemax
- Miranew Cinemas
- Shin Kong Cinemas
- Showtime Cinemas
- Vieshow Cinemas
