= Nice Plaza =

Shopping mall in East, Chiayi City, Taiwan

- 耐斯廣場

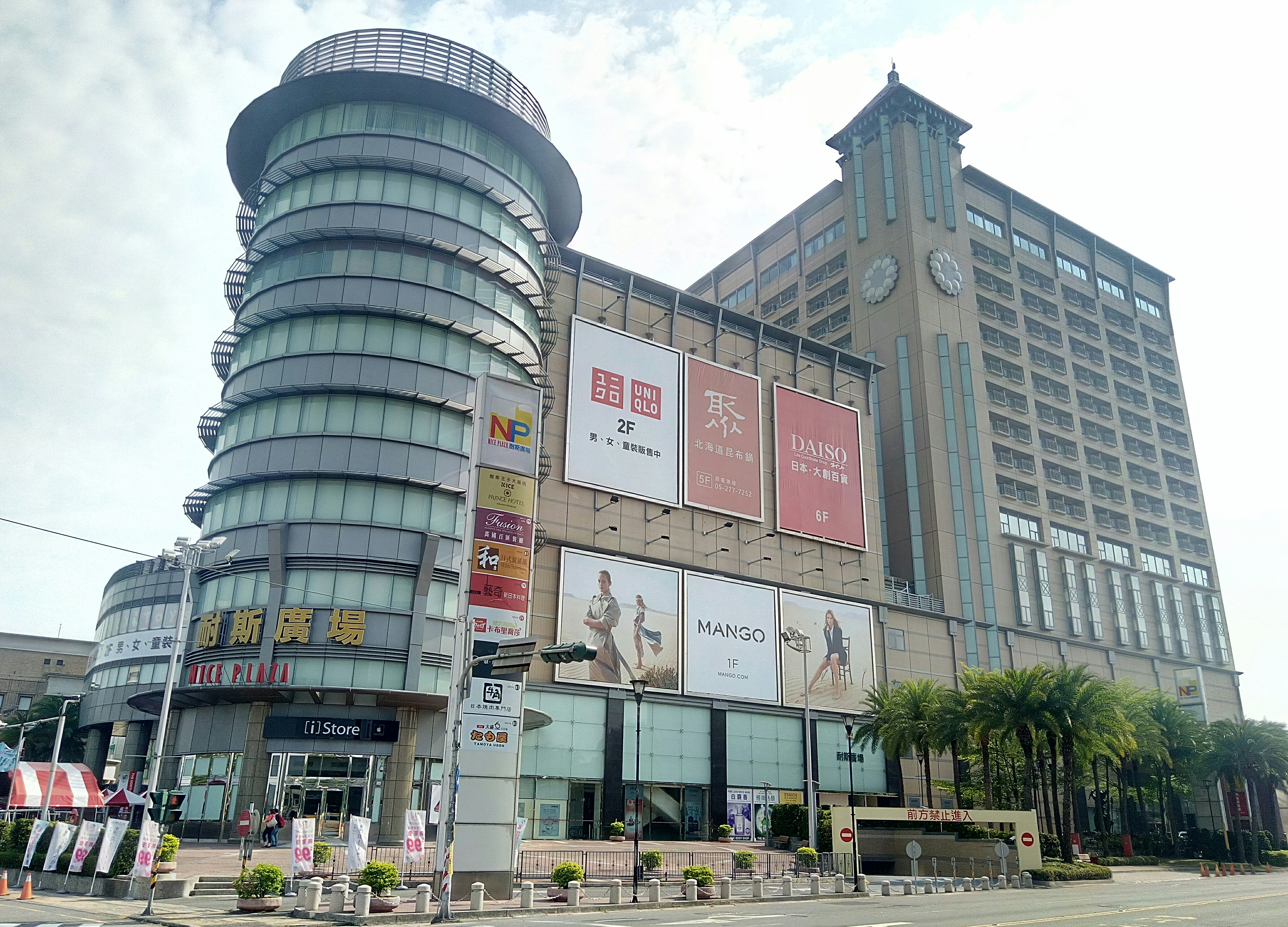
- Location: No. 600, Zhongxiao Road, East District, Chiayi City, Taiwan
- Coordinates: 23°29′47″N 120°27′09″E
- Opened: 2006
- Owner: Nice Group
- Floor area: 93,274.28 m^{2} (1,003,996.0 sq ft)
- Floors: 17 floors above ground 4 floors below ground
- Parking: 828
- Website: www.niceplaza.com.tw

Nice Plaza (Chinese: 耐斯廣場; pinyin: Nài Sī guǎngchǎng) is a shopping center in East District, Chiayi City, Taiwan that opened in 2006. It is the largest shopping mall in Chiayi City.

== History ==
- In April 2006, the Nice Plaza building was completed.
- On August 22, 2009, Fubon Life Insurance Co., Ltd. announced the purchase of the property rights of Nice Plaza (including department stores and restaurants) from Jianhushan World Company for NT$4.3 billion.

== Facilities ==
Nice Plaza Shopping Center opened in October 2006. It is the largest department store with the highest annual revenue in the city. The total floor area of the mall is about 39,000 m^{2} (420,000 sq ft) and the annual revenue in 2015 was NT$1.95 billion which accounts for nearly 50% of the Department Store market in Chiayi. When it opened in 2006, it cooperated with Japan's Matsuya Department Store, so it was not called Nice Plaza Shopping Center, but named Nice Matsuya Fashion Department Store. At that time, the department store business floors ranged from the first basement floor to the fourth floor above the ground and the front building five floors above the ground. The brands included beauty, men's and women's shoes, boutiques, clothing, accessories, household appliances, daily necessities, bedding and furnishings, kitchen supplies, and specialty products as well as themed restaurants and food courts. In 2015, Nice Matsuya Fashion Department Store was renamed to Nice Plaza Fashion Department Store. In 2017, it was renamed to Nice Plaza Shopping Center again.

== See also ==
- List of tourist attractions in Taiwan
- Showtime Live Chiayi
