= Showtime Live Shulin =

Shopping mall in Shulin, New Taipei, Taiwan

- 秀泰生活樹林店

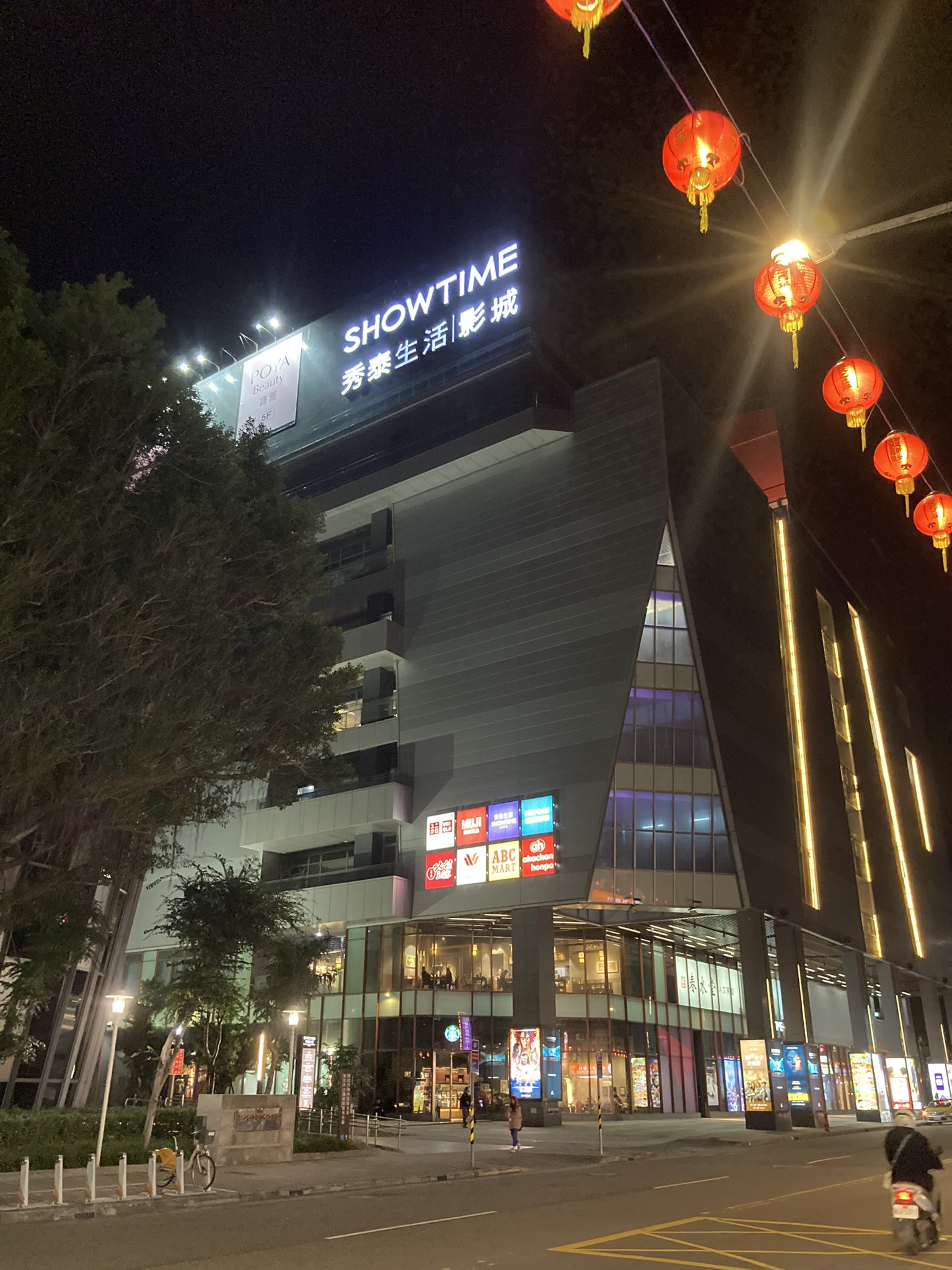
- Location: No. 40-6, Shuxin Road, Shulin District, New Taipei, Taiwan
- Coordinates: 24°59′44.0″N 121°25′41.7″E
- Opened: May 26, 2018
- Floor area: 62,041.64 m^{2} (667,810.7 sq ft) (including parking spaces)
- Floors: 14 floors above ground 1 floor below ground
- Parking: 428
- Website: https://www.showtimes.com.tw/

Showtime Live Shulin (Chinese: 秀泰生活樹林店) is a shopping mall in Shulin District, New Taipei City, Taiwan that opened on May 26, 2018. With a total floor area of 37,612.16 m^{2} (404,853.9 sq ft), it is the first and largest shopping center in the district. The main core stores of the mall include Showtime Cinemas, Uniqlo, Nitori, Muji and various themed restaurants.

== History ==
- On June 17, 2015, Showtime Live Shulin held a groundbreaking ceremony.
- On May 26, 2018, Showtime Live Shulin officially opened.

== Floor Guide ==
Levels 8 - 14	Showtime Cinemas
Level 7	Themed restaurants and food court
Level 6	Toys and baby products
Level 5	Home appliances, Nitori, electronics
Level 4	Stationary, music, cafe
Level 3	Sports, leisure, outdoor activities
Level 2	Women's fashion, handbags
Level 1	Uniqlo, Muji, cosmetics
B1	Parking spaces

== See also ==
- List of tourist attractions in Taiwan
- Showtime Live Taichung Wenxin
- Showtime Live Chiayi
- Showtime Live Taitung
- Showtime Live Taichung Station
