= Beyond Plaza =

Shopping mall in Yonghe, New Taipei, Taiwan

- 比漾廣場

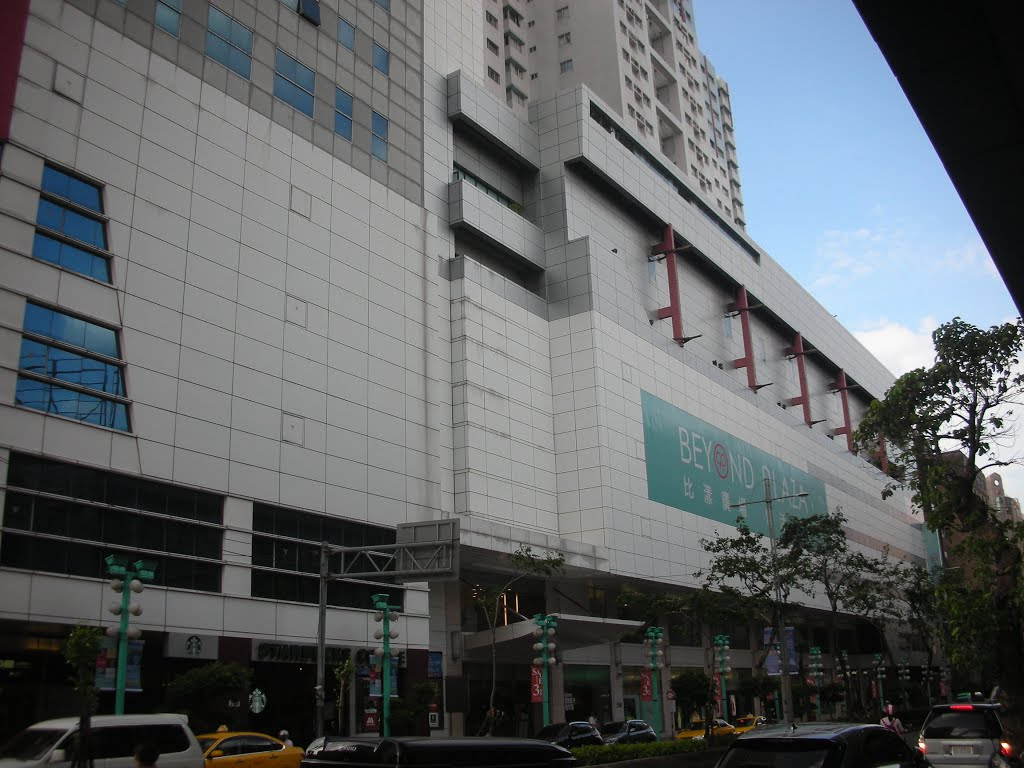
- Location: No. 238, Section 1, Zhongshan Road, Yonghe District, New Taipei, Taiwan
- Coordinates: 25°0′32″N 121°30′28″E
- Opened: April 2000
- Public transit: Dingxi metro station and Yongan Market metro station
- Website: https://www.beyondplaza.com.tw/

Beyond Plaza (Chinese: 比漾廣場; pinyin: Bǐ yàng guǎngchǎng) is a shopping center in Yonghe District, New Taipei, Taiwan that opened in April 2000. The original name of the mall was Pacific Department Store, but later changed to its current name in June 2014. It is the first and largest shopping mall in the district. The main core stores of the mall include Century Asia Cinemas, Mo Mo Paradise, Muji, Eslite Bookstore and ABC Mart. The mall is located in close proximity to Dingxi and Yongan Market metro stations.

== Floor Guide ==
Floor	Features
Level 9	Beyond Garden
Level 5	Gentlemen's fashion and home goods
Level 4	Century Asia Cinemas and restaurants
Level 3	Kids' fashion and toys
Level 2	Fashion and restaurants
Level 1	Cosmetics
B1	Lifestyle and Leisure
B2	Xiulang Market and Restaurants

== See also ==
- List of tourist attractions in Taiwan
