= Showtime Live Taitung =

Shopping mall in Taitung City, Taitung County, Taiwan

- 秀泰生活台東店
- Location: No. 93, Xinsheng Road, Taitung City, Taitung County, Taiwan
- Coordinates: 22.75229611476201°N 121.14834740040355°E
- Opened: July 12, 2013
- Floor area: 13,000 m^{2} (140,000 sq ft) (including parking spaces)
- Floors: 4 floors above ground 1 floor below ground
- Website: https://www.showtimes.com.tw/

Showtime Live Taitung (Chinese: 秀泰生活台東店) is a shopping mall in Taitung City, Taitung County, Taiwan that opened on July 12, 2013. With a total floor area of 13,000 m^{2} (140,000 sq ft), it is the first and largest shopping center in the county. The main core stores of the mall include Showtime Cinemas, Uniqlo, and various themed restaurants.

== History ==
- On December 1, 2011, Showtime Live Taitung held a groundbreaking ceremony, and it was planned and constructed at a cost of NT$ 500 million.
- On July 12, 2013, Showtime Live Taitung opened.

== See also ==
- List of tourist attractions in Taiwan
- Showtime Live Taichung Wenxin
- Showtime Live Taichung Station
- Showtime Live Shulin
- Showtime Live Chiayi
