= Showtime Live Taichung Station =

- 秀泰生活台中站前店

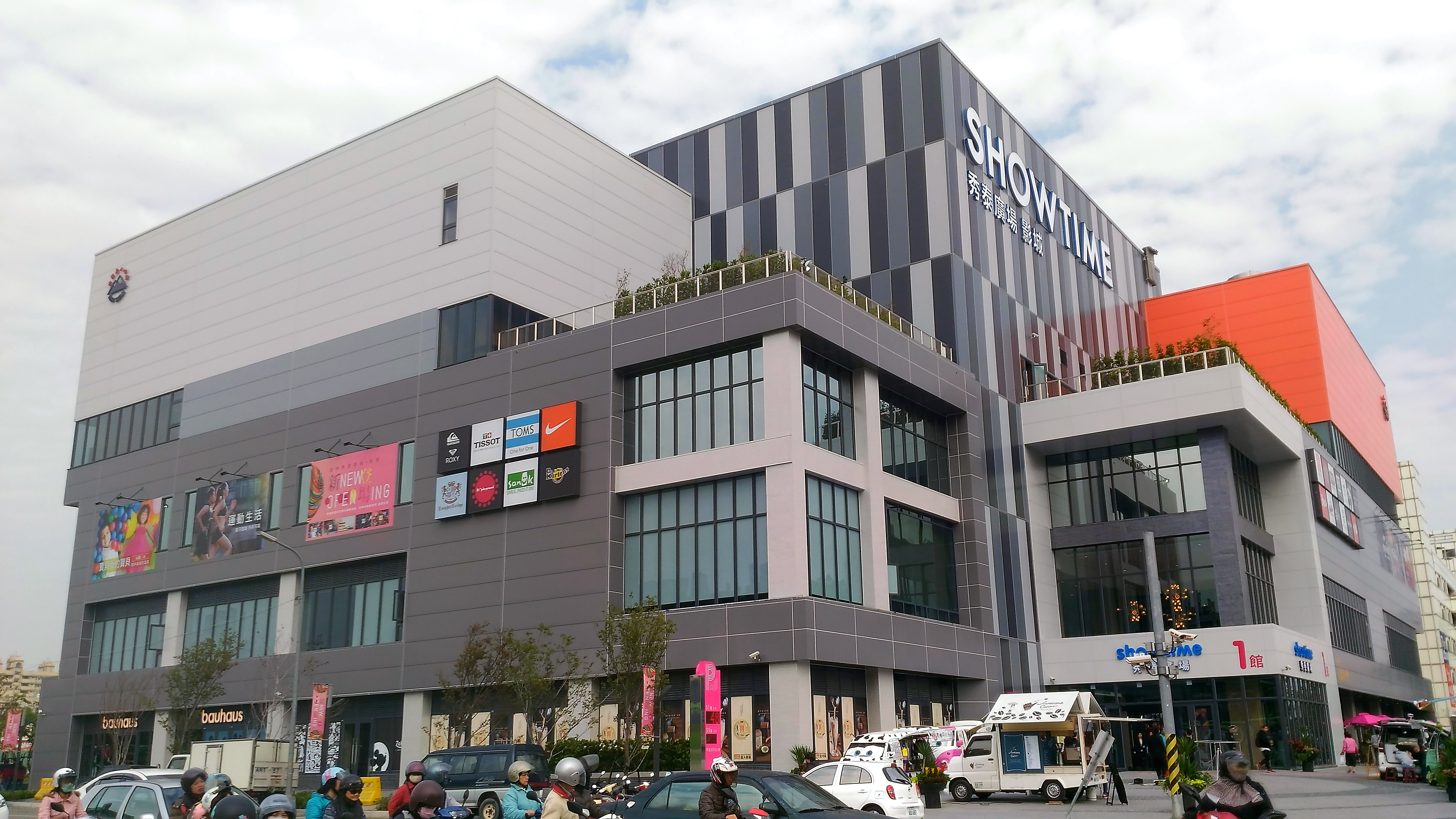
- Location: No. 66 & 76, Nanjing Road, East District, Taichung, Taiwan
- Coordinates: 24.140841905907774°N 120.69005040203362°E
- Opened: March 9, 2017
- Floor area: 45,503.68 m^{2} (489,797.5 sq ft) (including parking spaces)
- Floors: 5 floors above ground 2 floor below ground
- Website: https://www.showtimego.com.tw/

Showtime Live Taichung Station (Chinese: 秀泰生活台中站前店) is a shopping mall in East District, Taichung, Taiwan that opened on March 9, 2017. With two blocks and a total floor area of 45,503.68 m^{2} (489,797.5 sq ft), the main core stores of the mall include Showtime Cinemas, and various themed restaurants.

== History ==
- On October 29, 2014, groundbreaking ceremony of the mall was held.
- Trial operation took place on January 24, 2017.
- The mall officially opened on March 9, 2017.

== Gallery ==
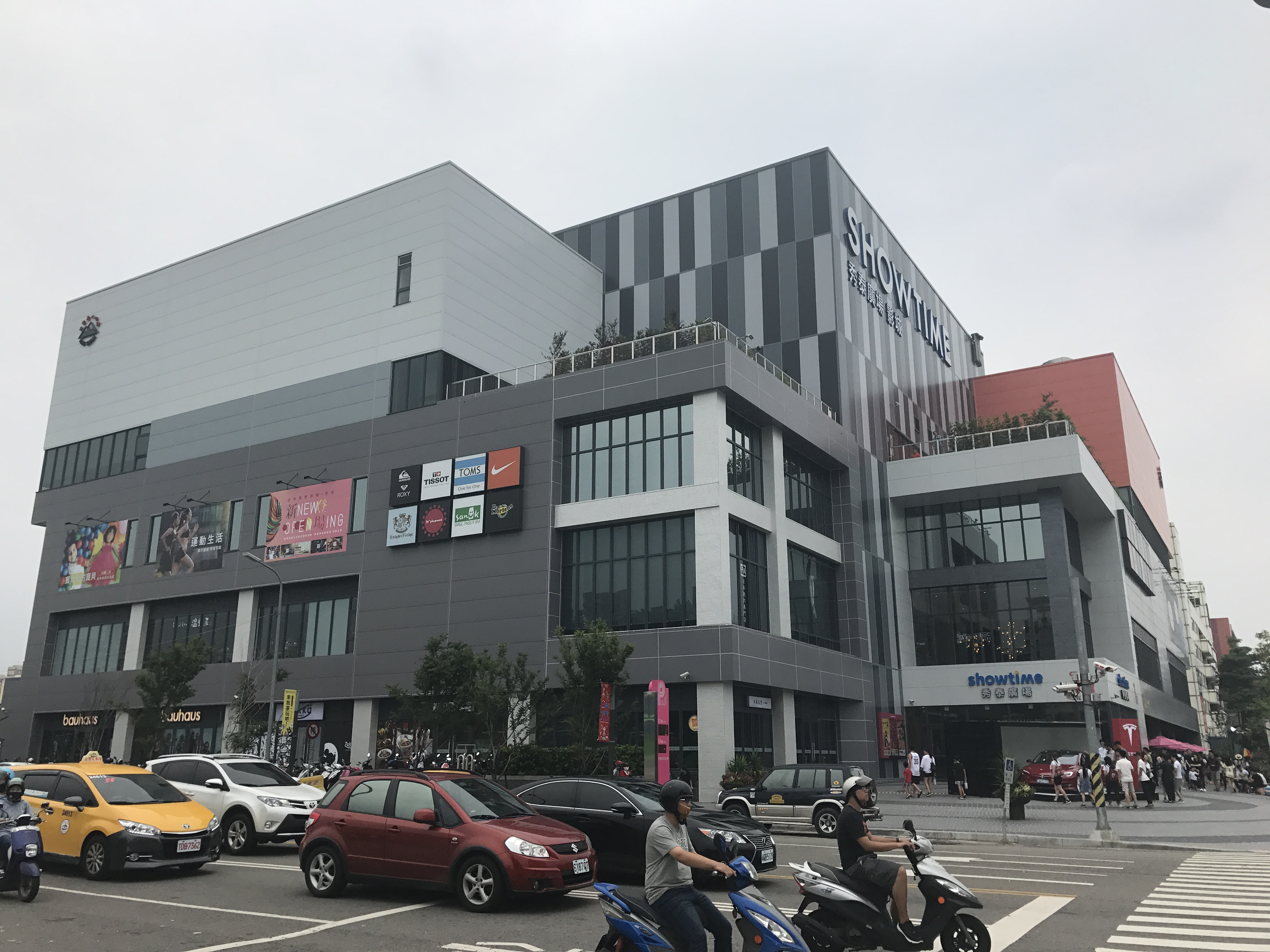
Exterior of S1 Block

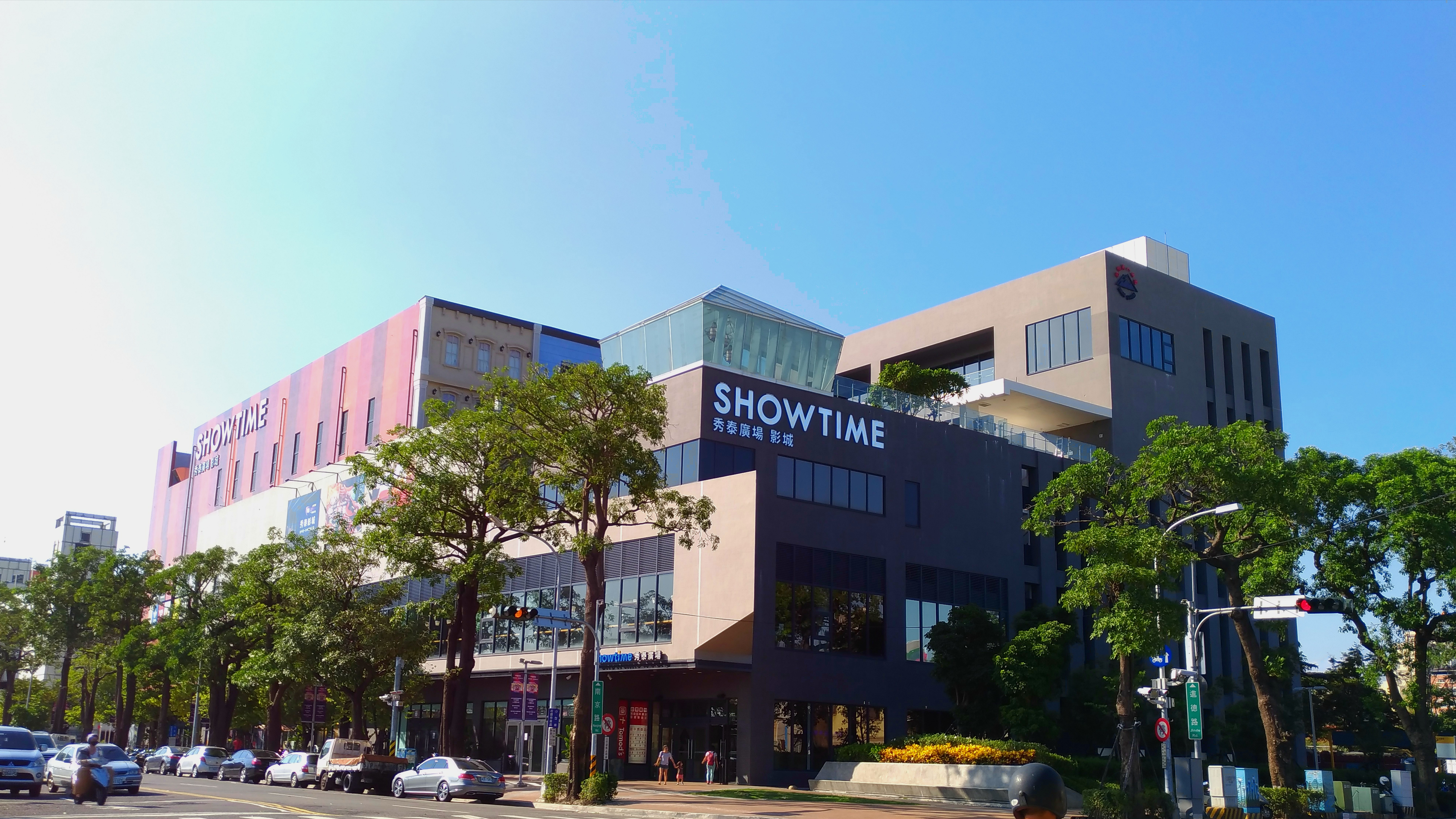
Exterior of S2 Block

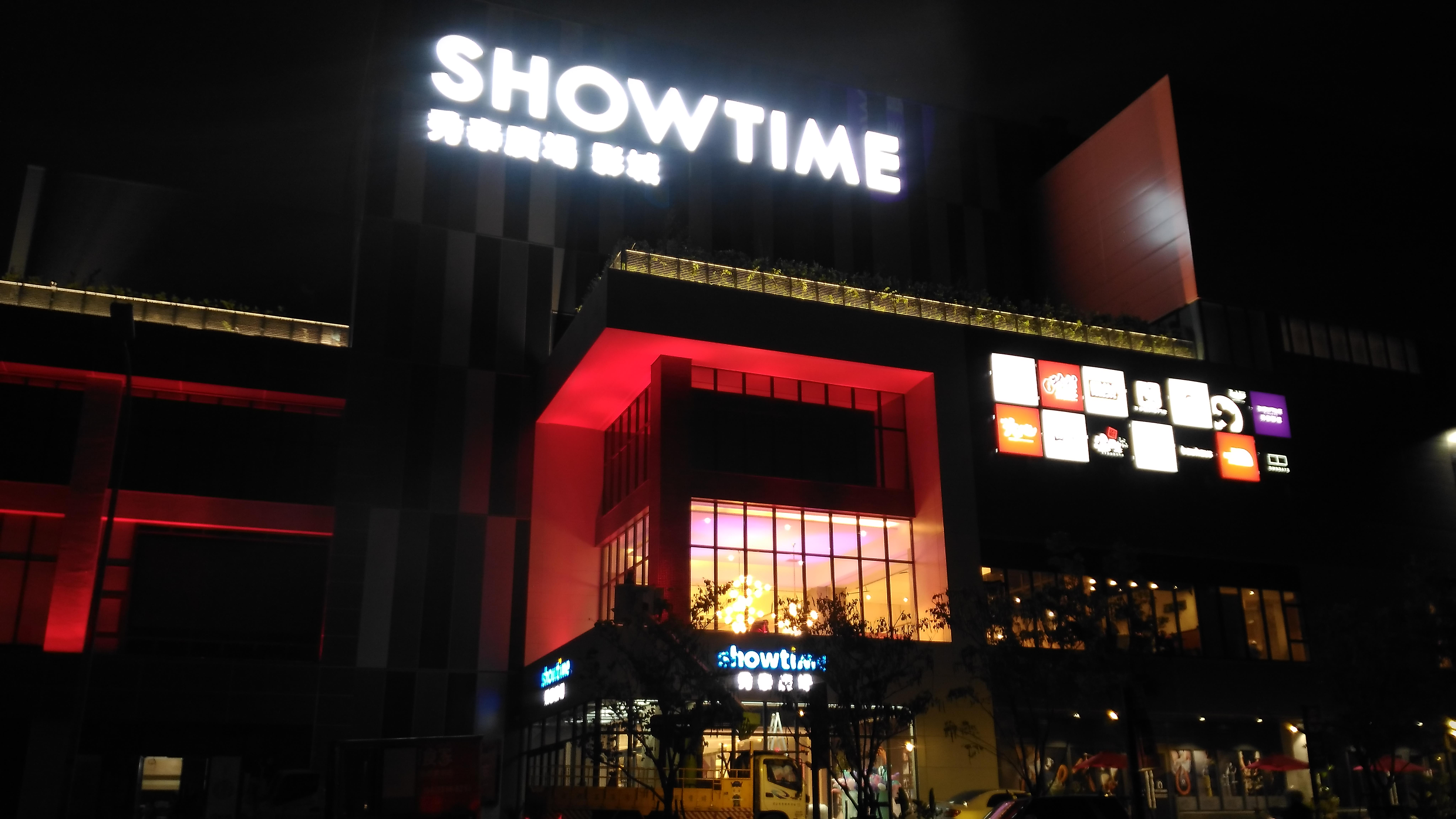
Night View

== See also ==
- List of tourist attractions in Taiwan
- Showtime Live Chiayi
- Showtime Live Taitung
- Showtime Live Taichung Wenxin
- Showtime Live Shulin
