= HiMall =

Taiwanese shopping mall based in New Taipei

- 麗寶百貨廣場
- Location: No. 3, Section 2, Xianmin Boulevard, Banqiao District, New Taipei, Taiwan
- Coordinates: 25°0′45″N 121°27′43″E
- Opened: January 10, 2013; 13 years ago
- Closed: August 31, 2025; 14 months ago
- Developer: Lihpao Construction Group
- Floor area: 58,979.47 m^{2} (634,849.7 sq ft)
- Floors: 6 floors above ground 2 floors below ground
- Public transit: Banqiao station
- Website: www.lihpaomall.com.tw

HiMall (Chinese: 麗寶百貨廣場; pinyin: Lìbǎo Bǎihùo Guǎngchǎng) is a Taiwanese shopping center in Banqiao District, New Taipei, Taiwan that opened on 10 January 2013. The mall is developed and operated by Lihpao Construction Group. The main core stores of the mall include Family Mart, Doctor Air, Tom's World, and Showtime Cinemas. The mall is located in close proximity to Banqiao station of the Bannan line of Taipei Metro. In August 2025, due to poor long-term operating performance, the mall only had a FamilyMart convenience store on the first floor, Showtime Cinemas on the second to fourth floors, and Tom's World on the fifth floor. Therefore, it announced that it would close down on 31st and would be converted into office space in the future.

== Notable incidents ==
On 8 December 2021, a 5-year-old boy was accidentally injured while riding a merry-go-round in the mall. The boy suffered three severed fingers on his right hand but remained conscious and was taken to Far Eastern Memorial Hospital in the district. Following the incident, New Taipei City's Joint Public Safety Inspection Team promptly conducted an inspection and ordered the facility to cease operations.

== See also ==
- List of tourist attractions in Taiwan
