= Showtime Live Taichung Wenxin =

Showtime Live Wenxin
- 秀泰生活台中文心店

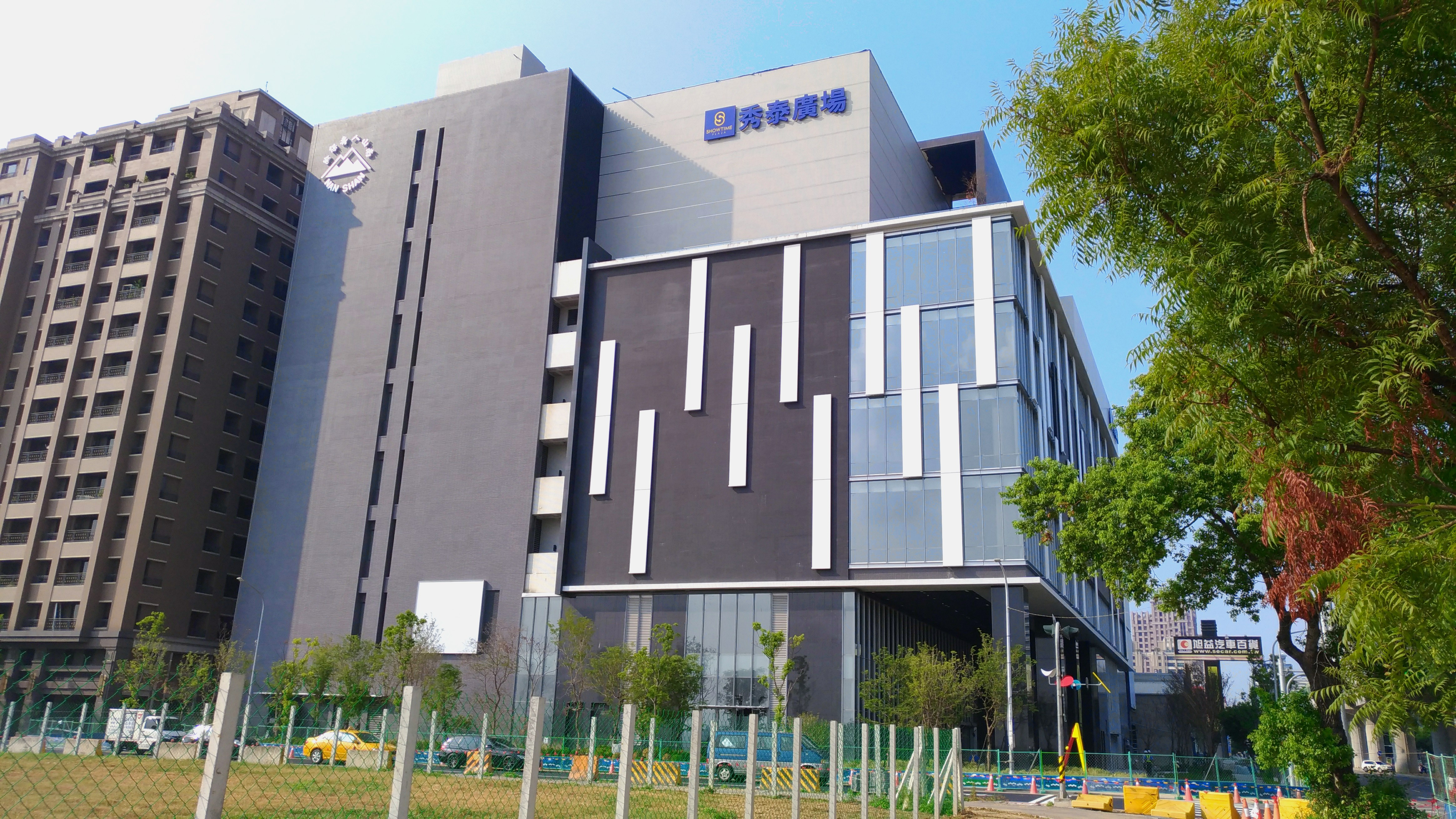
- Location: No. 289, Wenxin South Road, Nantun District, Taichung, Taiwan
- Coordinates: 24.129861263566063°N 120.64607731022521°E
- Opened: August 8, 2018
- Floor area: 80,961.62 m^{2} (871,463.6 sq ft) (including parking spaces)
- Floors: 9 floors above ground 5 floor below ground
- Parking: 518 parking spaces
- Website: https://www.showtimego.com.tw/

Showtime Live Wenxin (Chinese: 秀泰生活台中文心店) is a shopping mall in Nantun District, Taichung, Taiwan that opened on August 8, 2018. With a total floor area of 80,961.62 m^{2} (871,463.6 sq ft), the main core stores of the mall include Showtime Cinemas, Uniqlo, Muji, Nitori, and various themed restaurants. The total annual revenue in 2019 is approximately NT$2 billion.

== History ==
In 2012, Nanshan Life Insurance purchased an area of approximately 10,000 m^{2} (110,000 sq ft) of land on Wenxin South Road in Taichung City for NT$3 billion. On June 23, 2014, construction of the mall officially started. Trial operation took place on June 22, 2018, and the mall officially opened on August 8.

== See also ==
- List of tourist attractions in Taiwan
- Showtime Live Chiayi
- Showtime Live Taichung Station
- Showtime Live Shulin
- Showtime Live Taitung
