= Shin Shin Department Store =

- 欣欣百貨
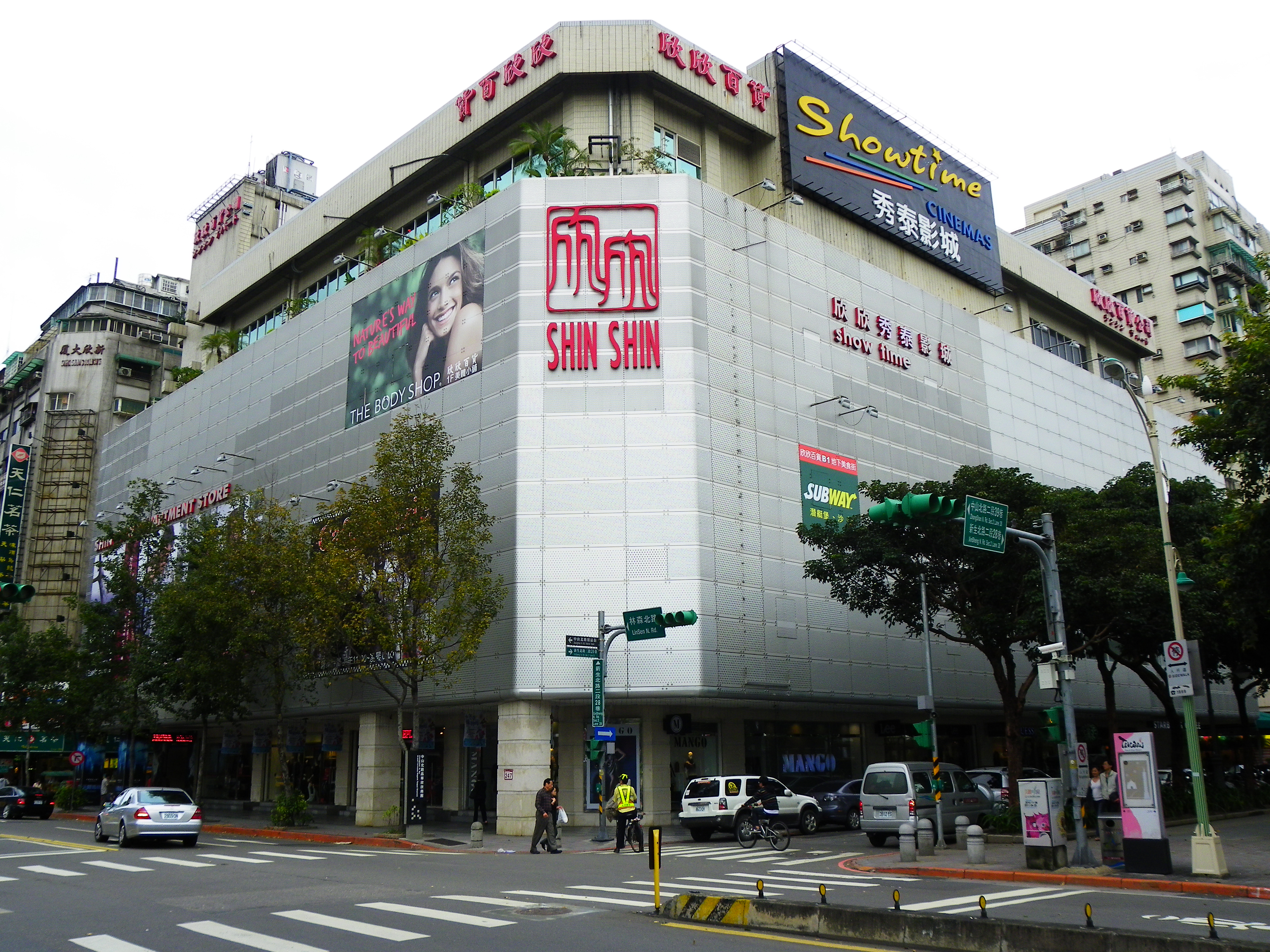
- Location: No. 247, Linsen North Road, Zhongshan District, Taipei, Taiwan
- Coordinates: 25°3′16″N 121°31′32″E
- Opened: June 28, 1972; 54 years ago
- Floors: 2 floors above ground 1 floors below ground
- Public transit: Zhongshan metro station
- Website: www.shinshinltd.com.tw

Shin Shin Department Store (Chinese: 欣欣百貨; pinyin: Xīn Xīn Bǎihùo) is a small-sized Taiwanese shopping center in Zhongshan District, Taipei, Taiwan that opened on 28 June 1972. The mall is partly invested by the Veterans Affairs Council and is one of the oldest shopping malls in the district.

The main core stores of the mall include Toys R Us, Mia C'bon, Sushiro, and Showtime Cinemas. The mall is located in close proximity to Zhongshan metro station of the Songshan–Xindian line and Tamsui-Xinyi Line of Taipei Metro.

== See also ==
- List of tourist attractions in Taiwan
- List of shopping malls in Taipei
