= T.S. Mall =

Shopping mall in East, Tainan, Taiwan

- 南紡購物中心

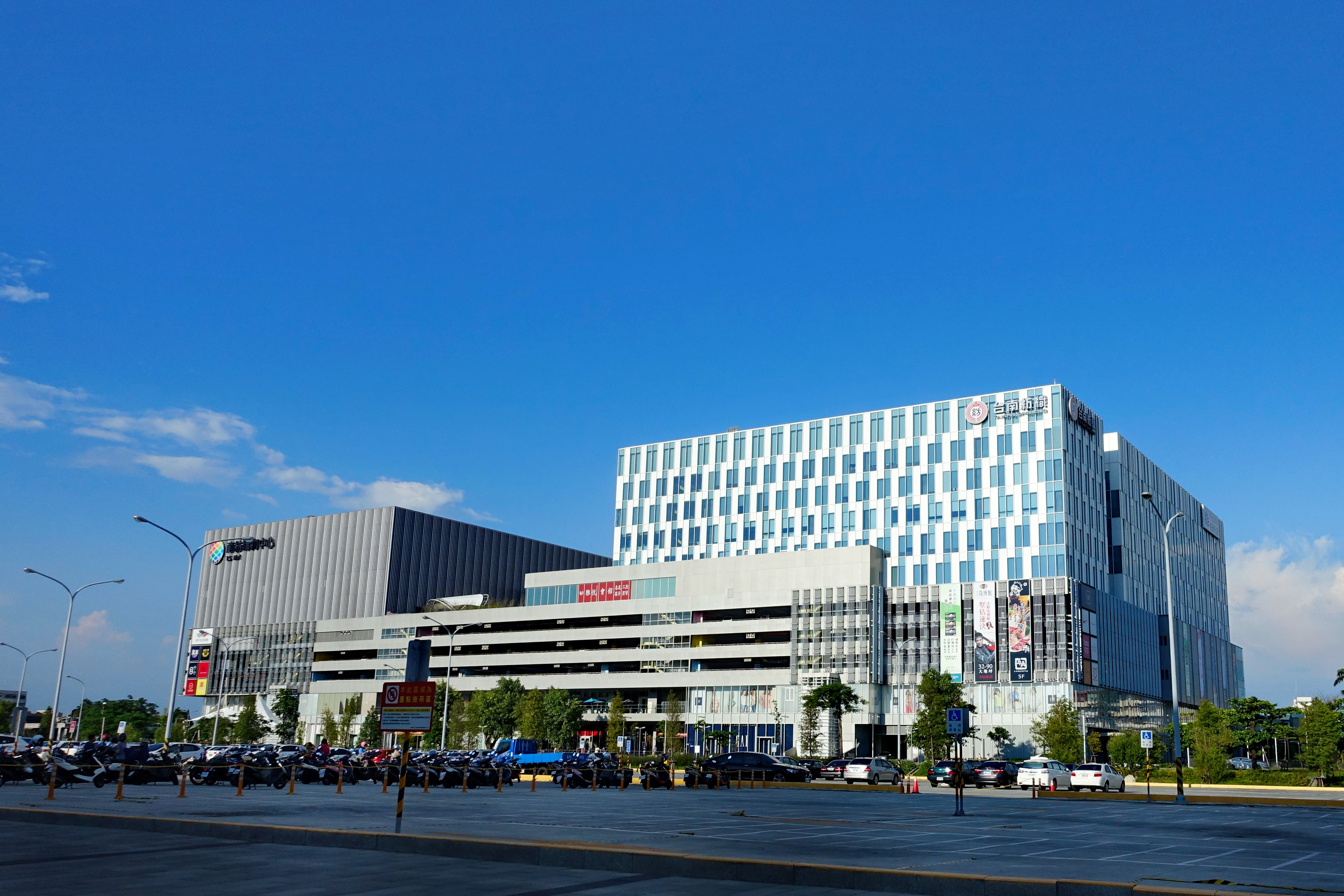
- Location: No. 366, Section 1, Zhonghua East, East District, Tainan, Taiwan
- Coordinates: 22°59′26.6″N 120°13′58.7″E
- Opened: February 11, 2015
- Developer: Tainan Spinning Co., Ltd. and Uni-President Enterprises Corporation
- Manager: Tainan Spinning Co., Ltd.
- Floor area: 254,000 m^{2} (2,730,000 sq ft) (including parking spaces)
- Floors: 10 floors above ground 3 floor below ground
- Parking: 1109 parking spaces
- Website: www.tsrd.com.tw

T.S. Mall (Chinese: 南紡購物中心) is a shopping mall in East District, Tainan, Taiwan that opened on February 11, 2015 (trial operation on December 30, 2014). The total floor area of the mall interior is about 254,000 m^{2} (2,730,000 sq ft). Jointly developed by Tainan Spinning Co., Ltd. and Uni-President Enterprises Corporation, it is the largest shopping mall in Tainan.

== History ==
The location of T.S. Mall was a racecourse during the Japanese occupation. After the war, it was bought by Tainan Spinning Co., Ltd. and established the main factory building of the company when it was founded.

With a total land area of 120,000 m^{2} (1,300,000 sq ft), it is scheduled to be developed in four phases. The first phase is T.S. Mall A1 Hall, Hotel Royal Tainan, Nanfang International Building, Times Park, and the second phase is T.S. Mall A2 Hall. The third phase is a boutique department store and a five-star hotel, and the fourth phase is a residential skyscraper.

Hall A2 is a 9-story building with 2 floors above ground. The building area is about 100,000 m^{2} (1,100,000 sq ft) and the total floor area will be 70,000 m^{2} (750,000 sq ft). On March 19, 2018 construction started and was completed in November 2020. Trial operation started on December 25, 2020 and it officially opened on March 31, 2021. The skybridge on the 2nd to 3rd floors above the ground and the connecting passage on the 1st floor underground lead to Hall A1.

== Gallery ==
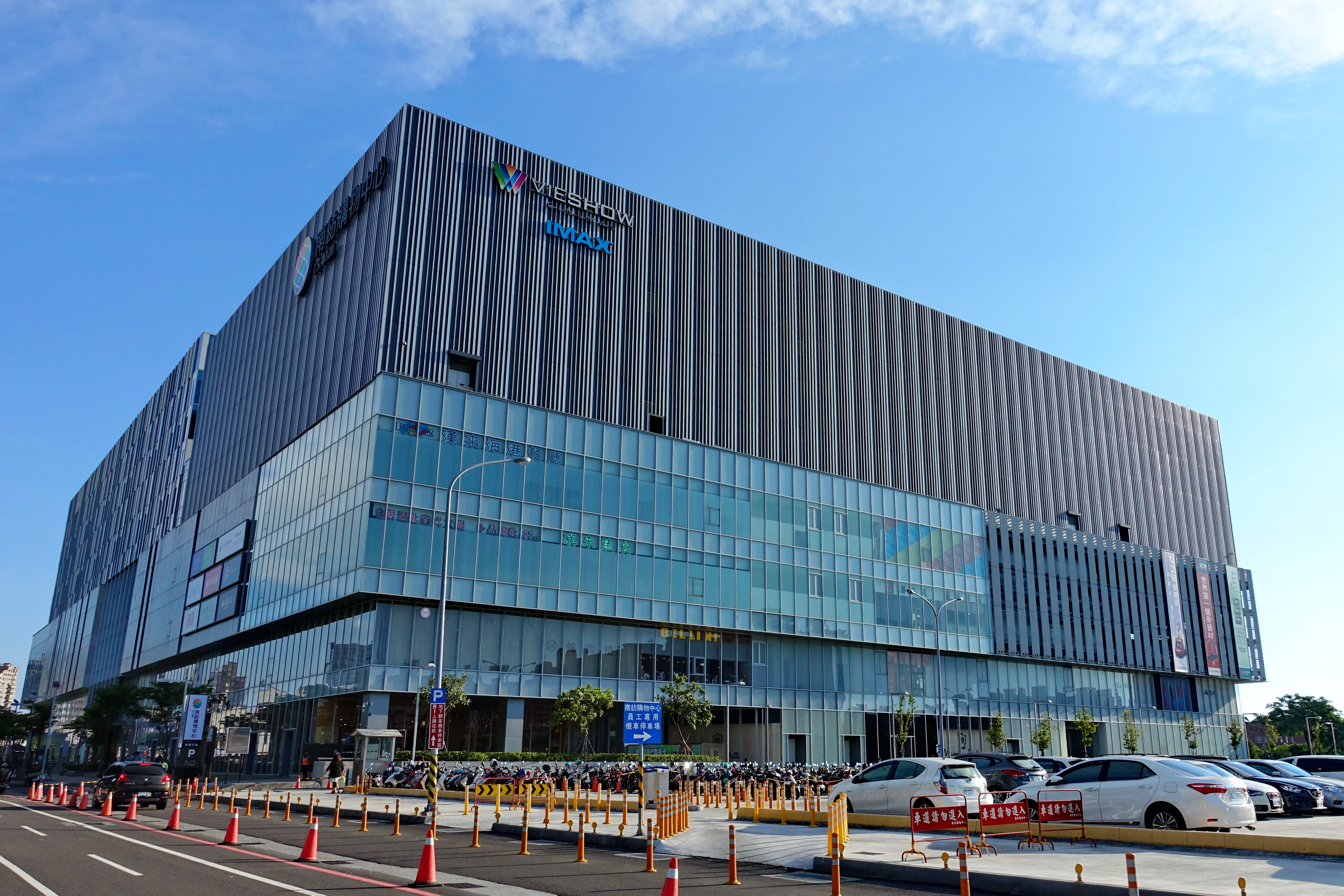
Exterior

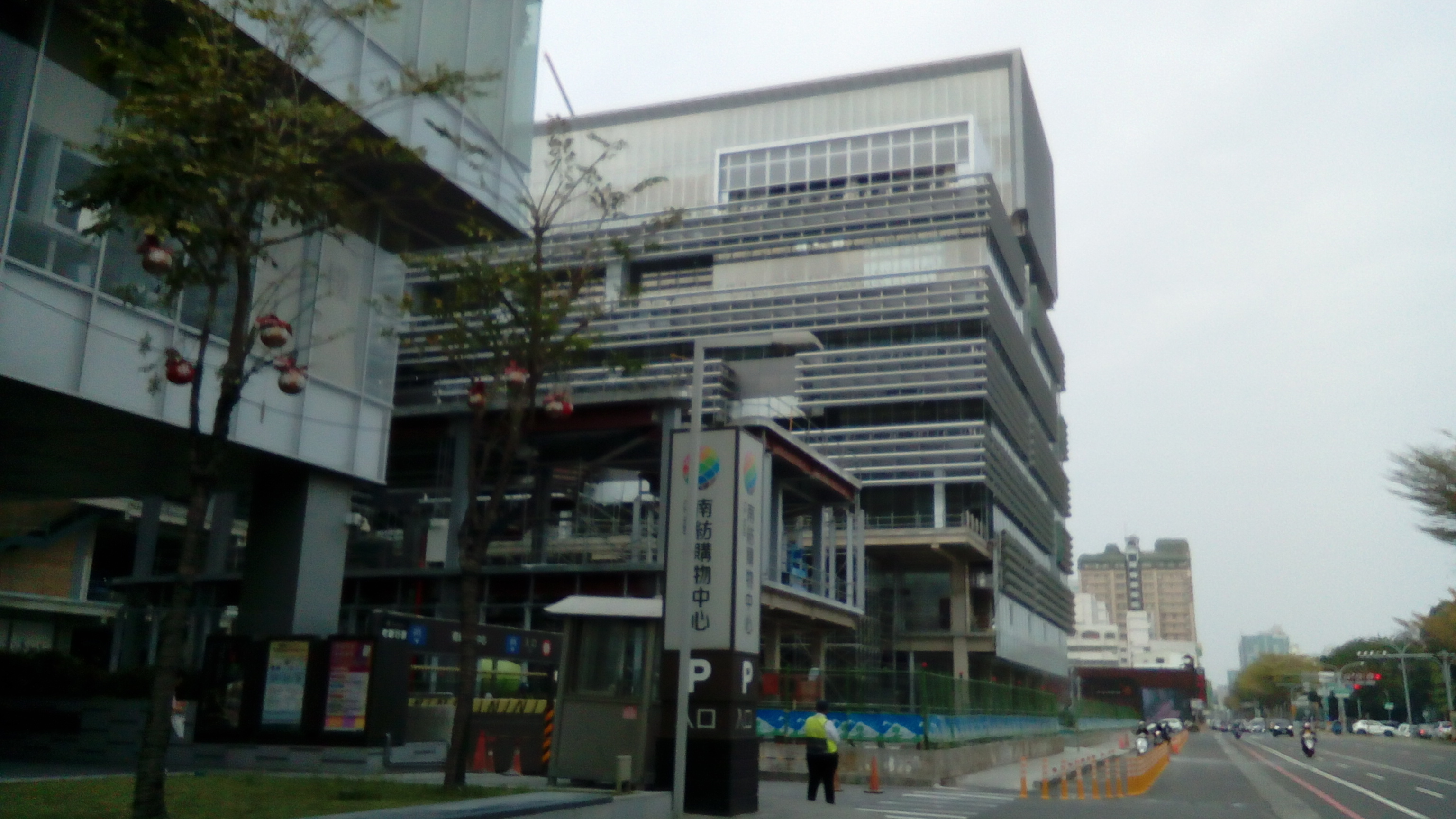
Phase 2 under construction

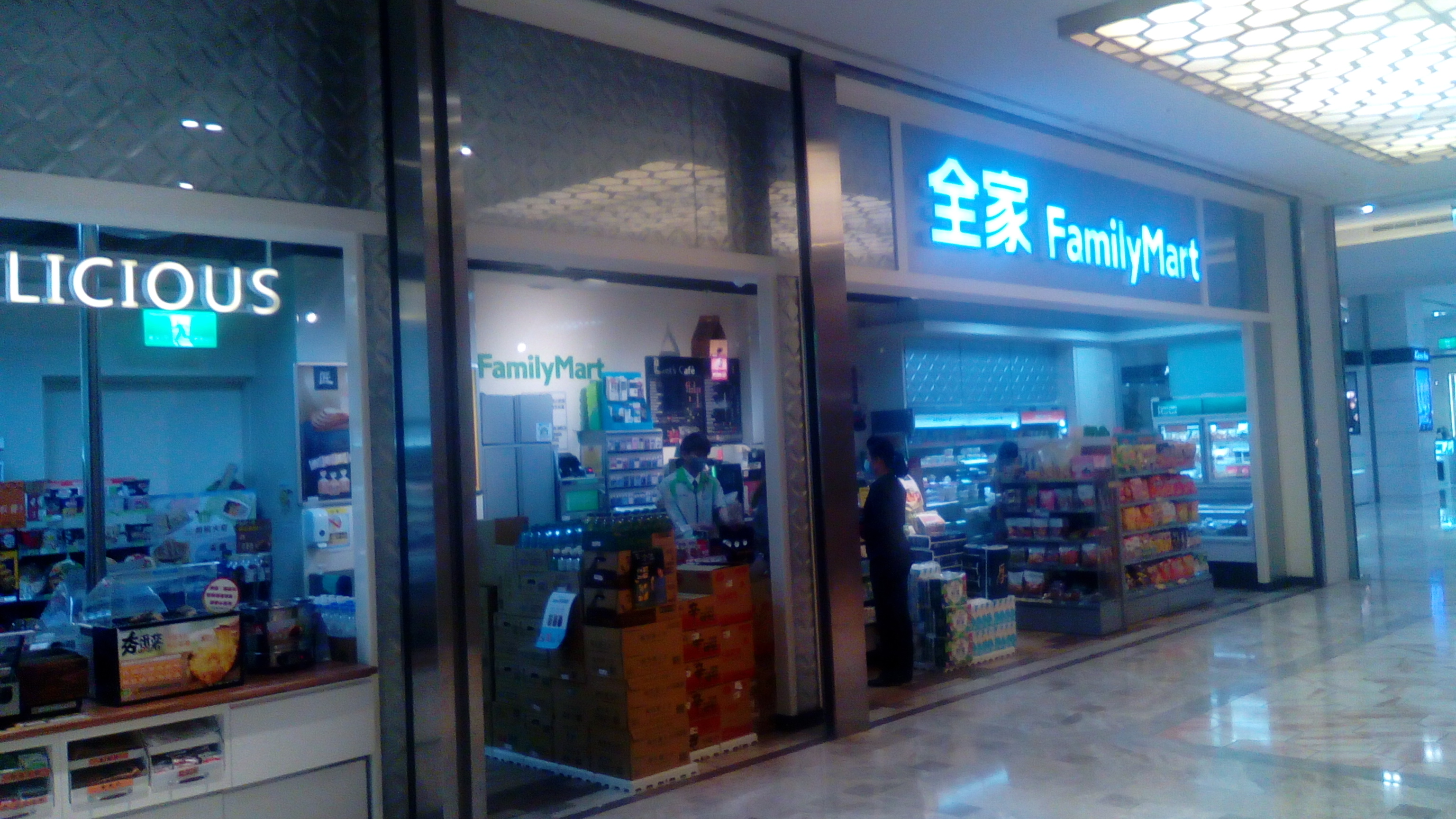

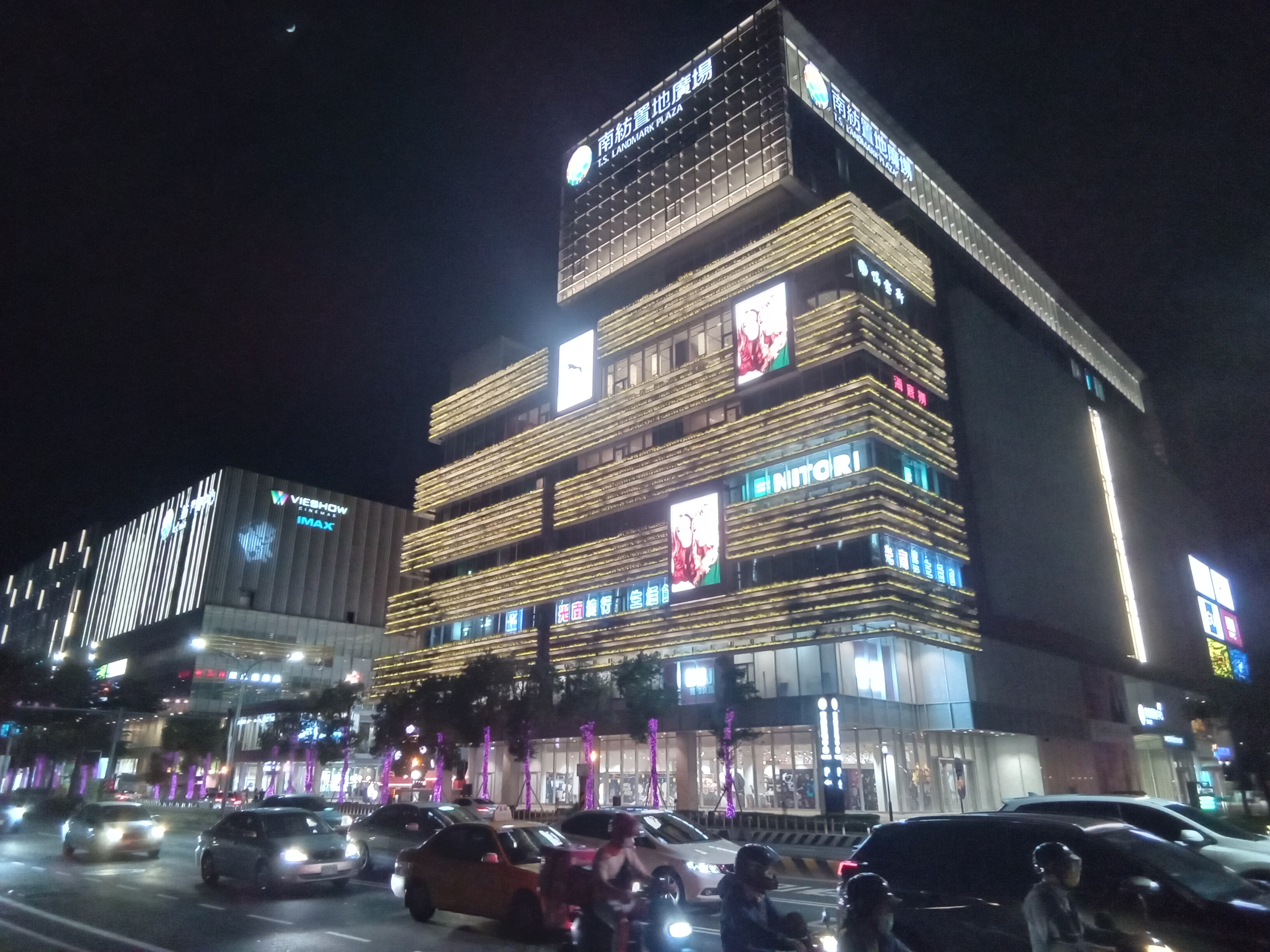
T.S. Mall at night

== See also ==
- List of tourist attractions in Taiwan
