= Showtime Live Chiayi =

Shopping mall in West, Chiayi City, Taiwan

- 秀泰生活台中文心店

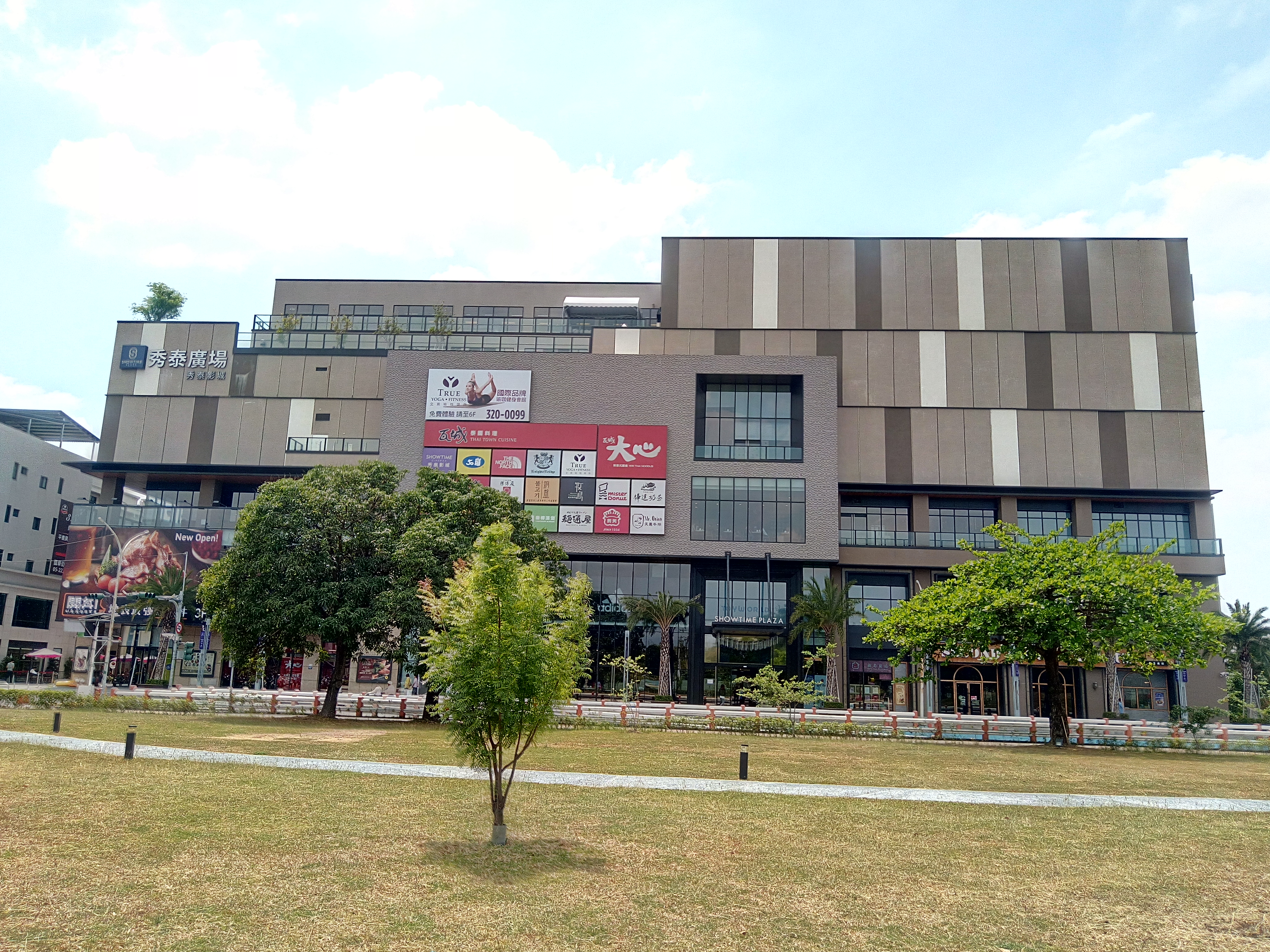
- Location: No. 299, Wenhua Road, West District, Chiayi City, Taiwan
- Coordinates: 23.485640806268552°N 120.44812820493642°E
- Opened: January 30, 2016
- Floor area: 25,781.11 m^{2} (277,505.6 sq ft) (including parking spaces)
- Floors: 7 floors above ground 2 floor below ground
- Parking: 149 parking spaces
- Website: https://www.showtimego.com.tw/pages/chiayi

Showtime Live Chiayi (Chinese: 秀泰生活台中文心店) is a shopping mall in West District, Chiayi City, Taiwan that opened on January 30, 2016. With a total floor area of 25,781.11 m^{2} (277,505.6 sq ft), the main core stores of the mall include Showtime Cinemas, True Fitness, Xiaomi, Huawei and various themed restaurants.

== Design ==
For the overall design of Showtime Live Chiayi, the American international design team Hirsch Bedner Associates was employed.

== Gallery ==
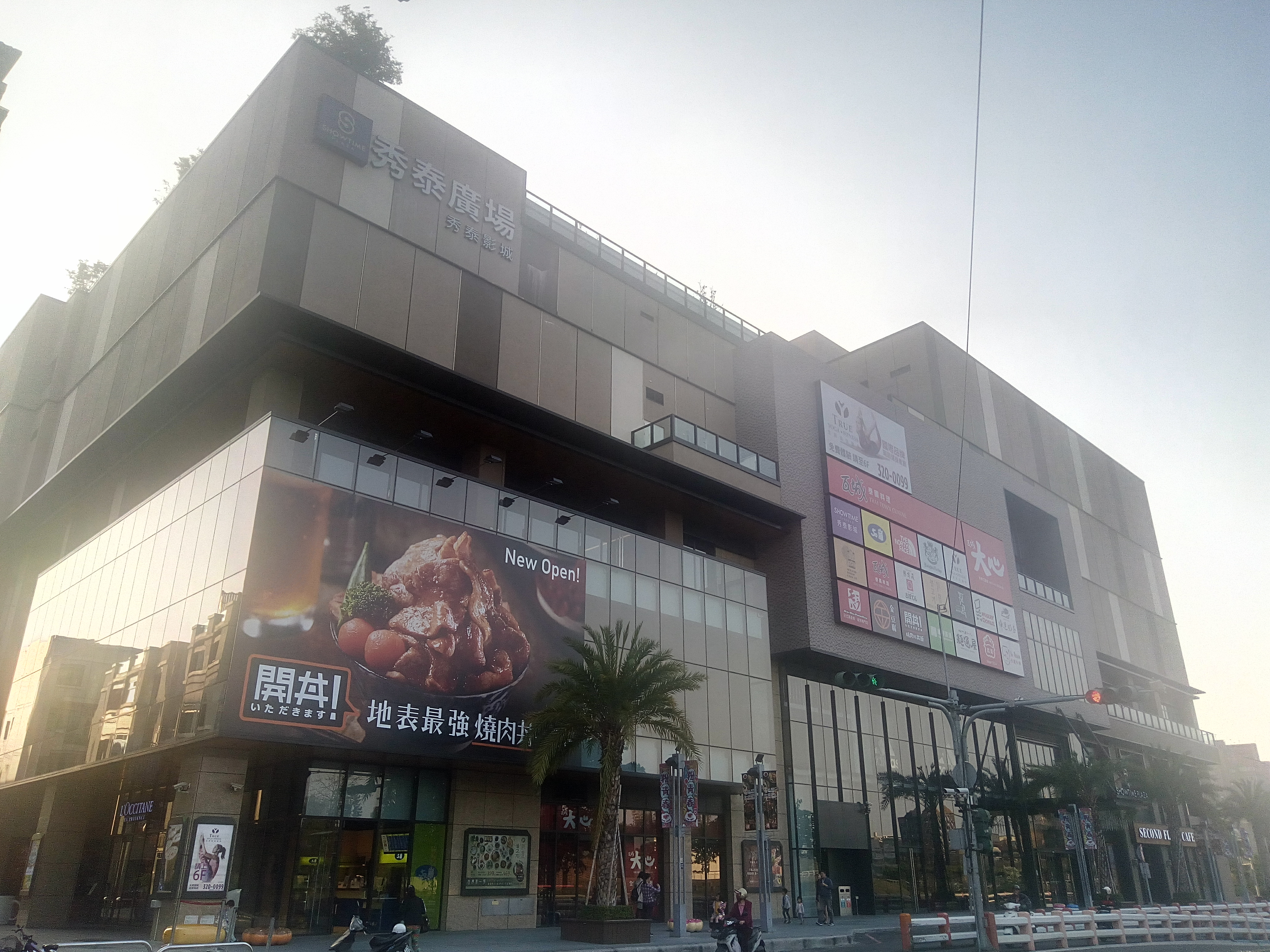
Exterior

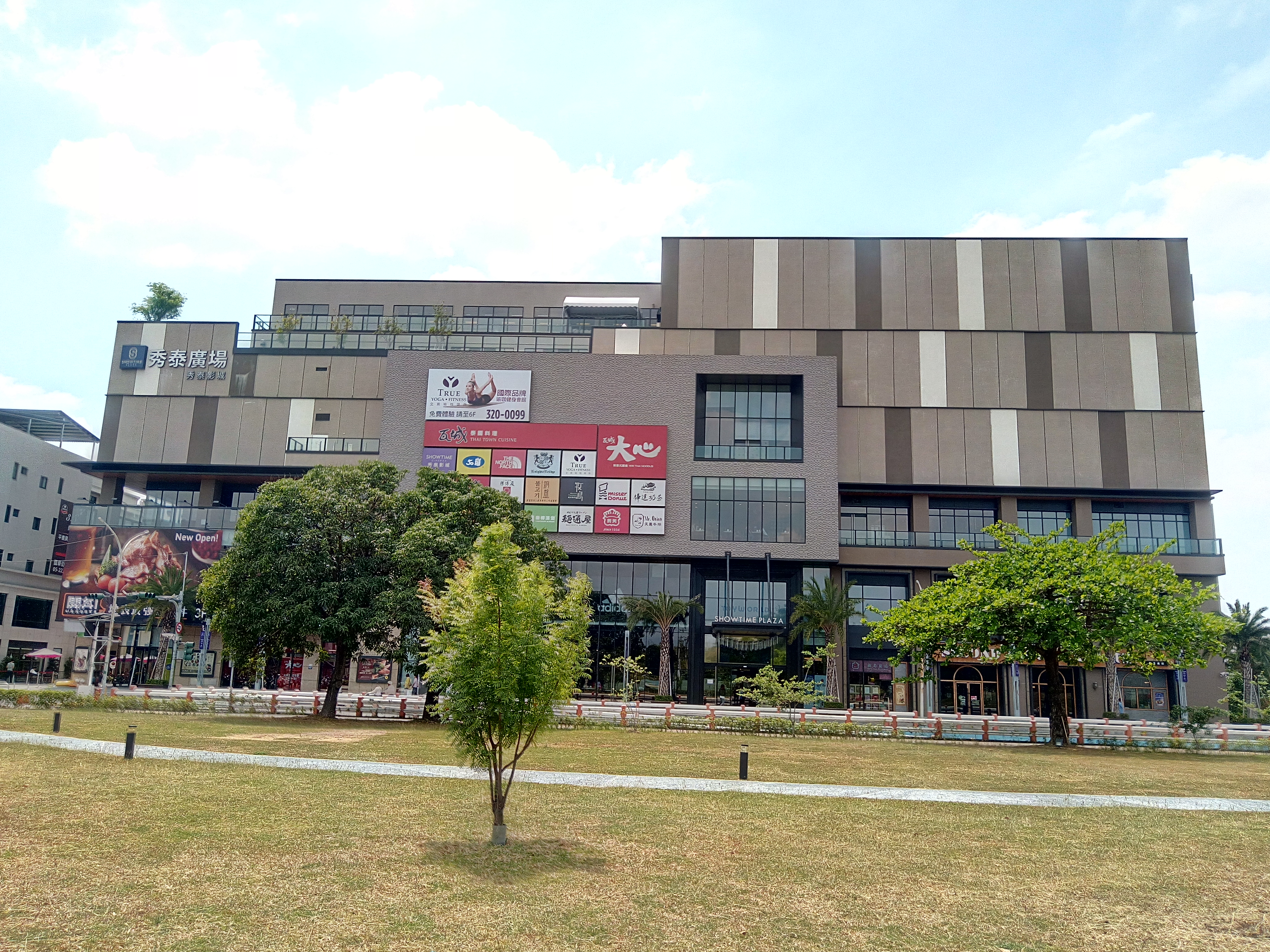
Exterior

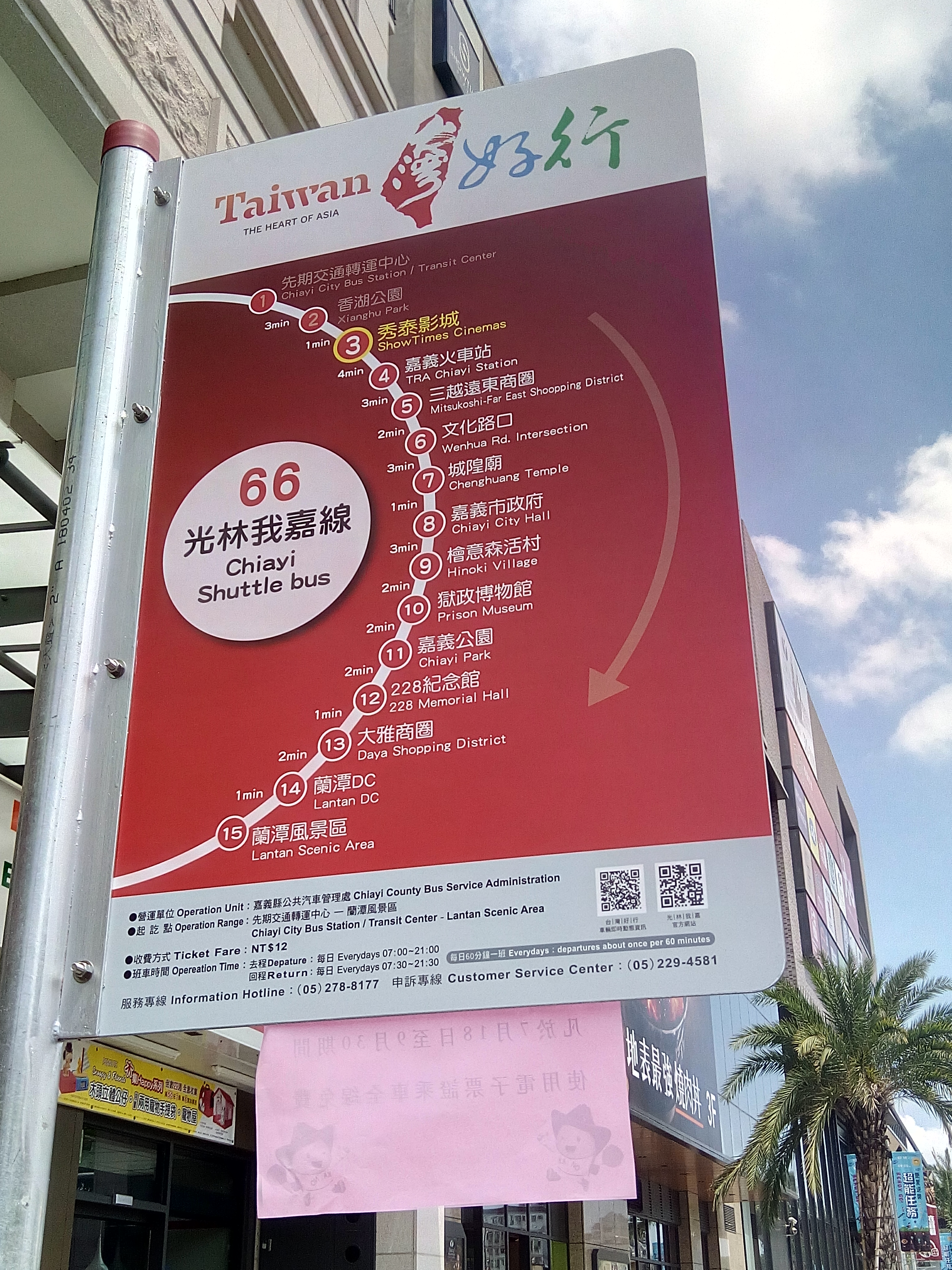
Chiayi Shuttle Bus Stop

== See also ==
- List of tourist attractions in Taiwan
- Nice Plaza
- Showtime Live Taichung Wenxin
- Showtime Live Taichung Station
- Showtime Live Shulin
- Showtime Live Taitung
