= Lovego Plaza =

Shopping mall in Gangshan, Kaohsiung, Taiwan

- 樂購廣場
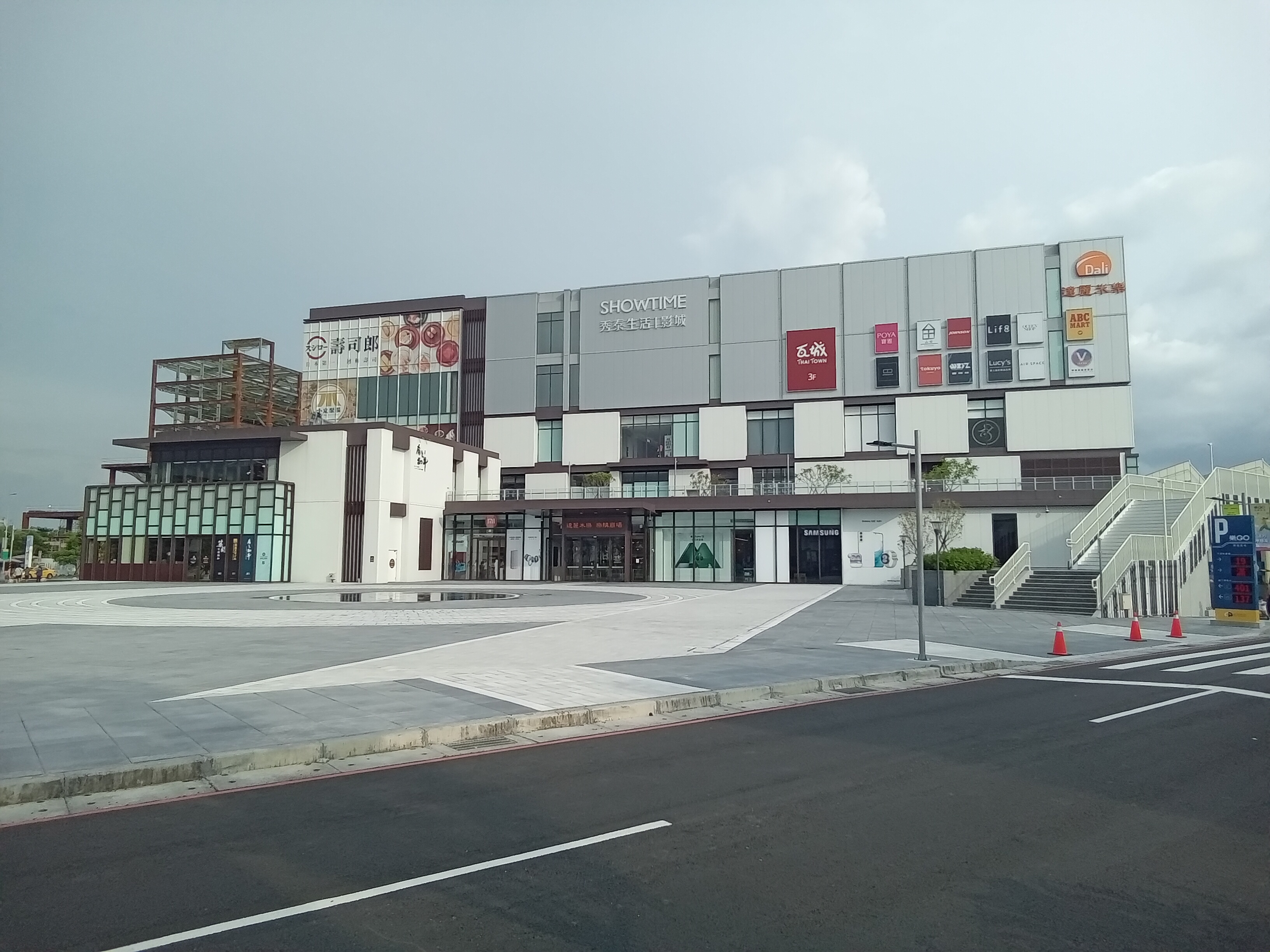
- Location: No. 2, Lane 1, Jie-an Road, Gangshan District, Kaohsiung, Taiwan
- Coordinates: 22.7799°N 120.3002°E
- Opened: 23 June 2022
- Floor area: 52,900 m^{2} (569,000 sq ft)
- Floors: 5 floors above ground 2 floors below ground
- Public transit: Kaohsiung Medical University Gangshan Hospital metro station
- Website: https://www.damishow.com.tw/

Lovego Plaza (Chinese: 樂購廣場) is a shopping center located in Gangshan District, Kaohsiung, Taiwan. The mall started trial operations on 26 May 2022, and officially opened on 23 June 2022. With a total floor area of 52,900 m^{2} (569,000 sq ft), the mall has five storeys above ground and 2 storeys below ground. It is the largest shopping mall in north Kaohsiung and the main core stores include Showtime Cinemas, Uniqlo, Muji, Nitori, Daiso and various themed restaurants, such as Kura Sushi. It is located in close proximity to Kaohsiung Medical University Gangshan Hospital metro station on the Red line of Kaohsiung Metro.

== Gallery ==
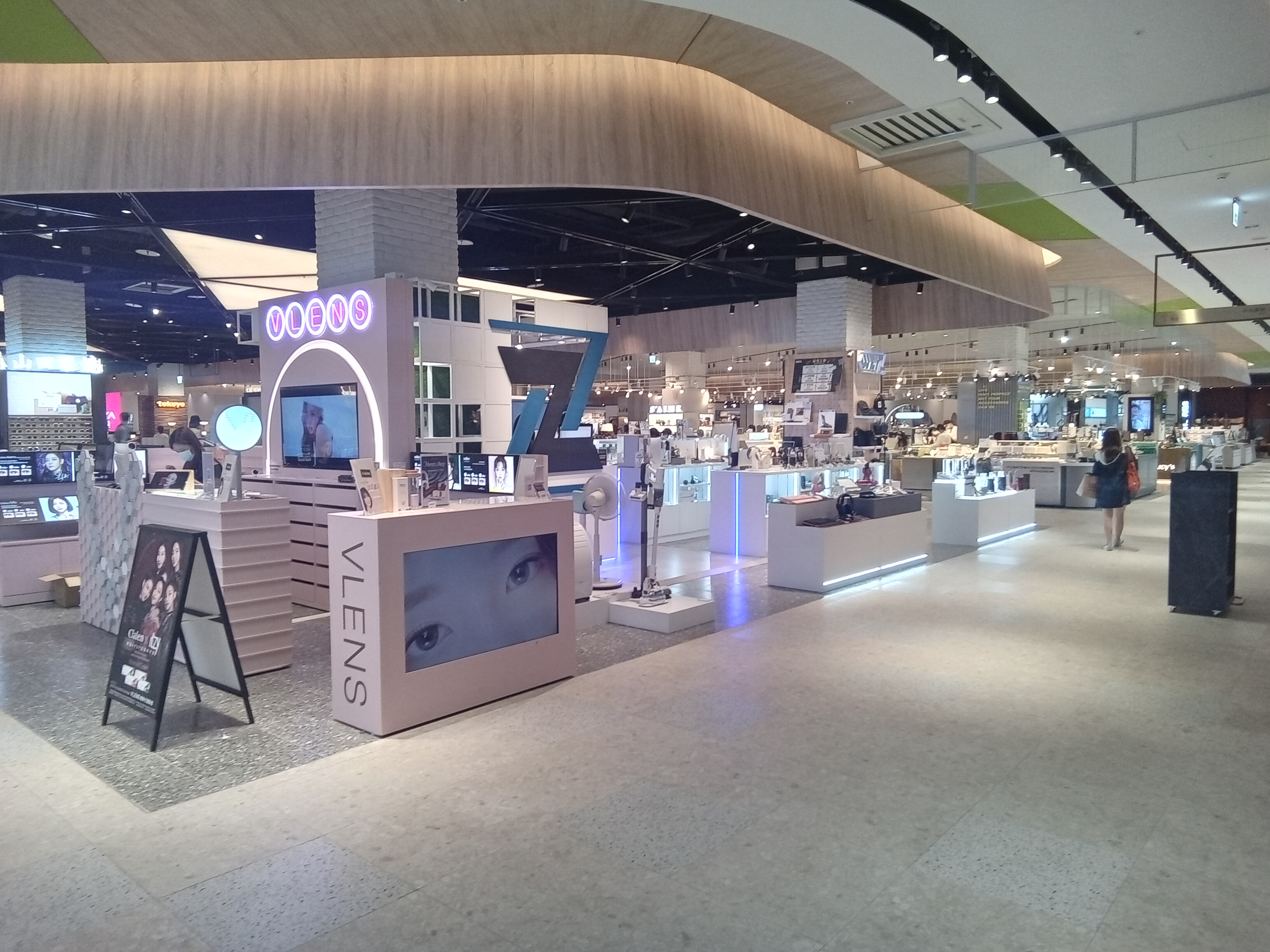
Level 1

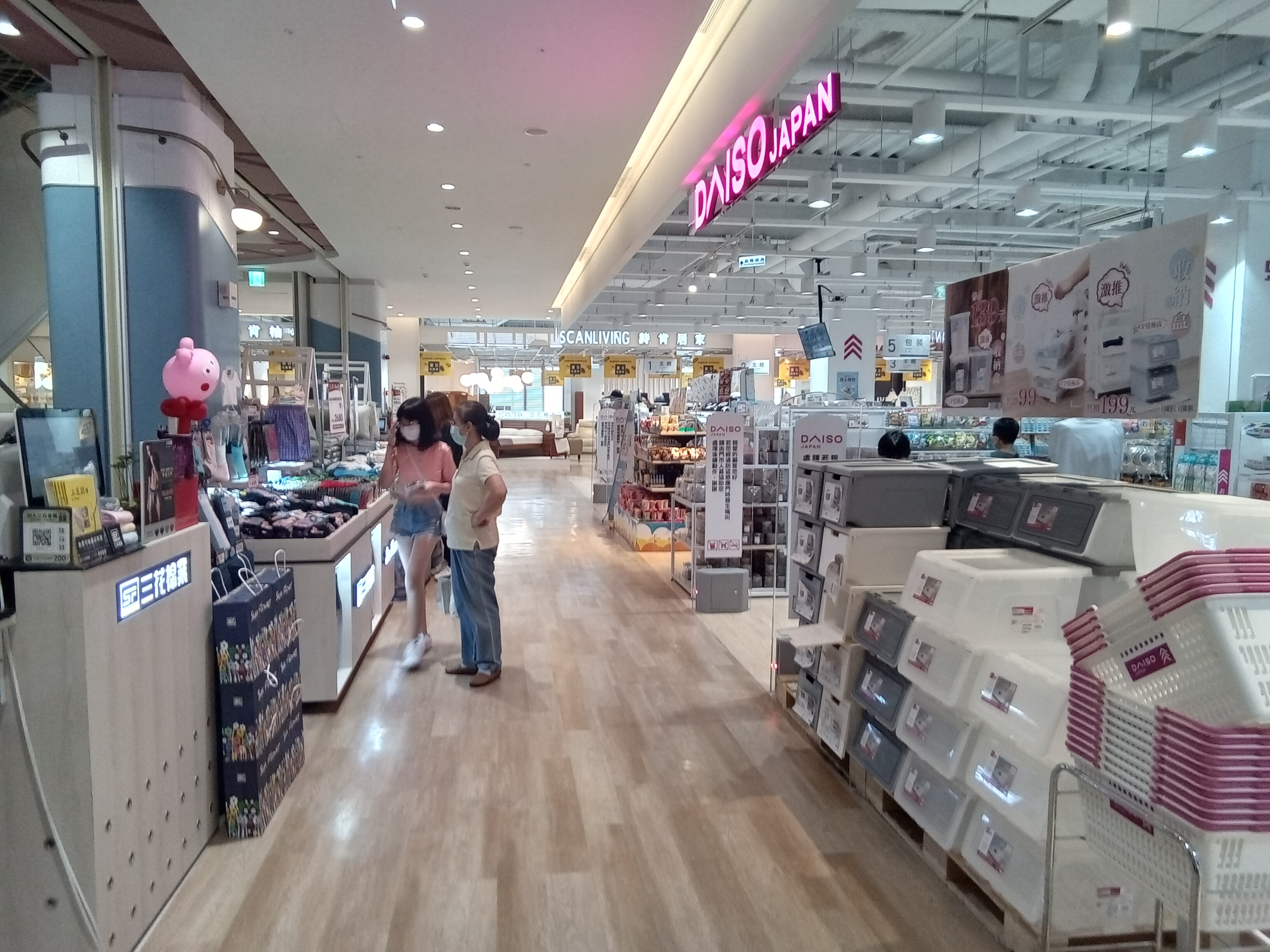
Level 2

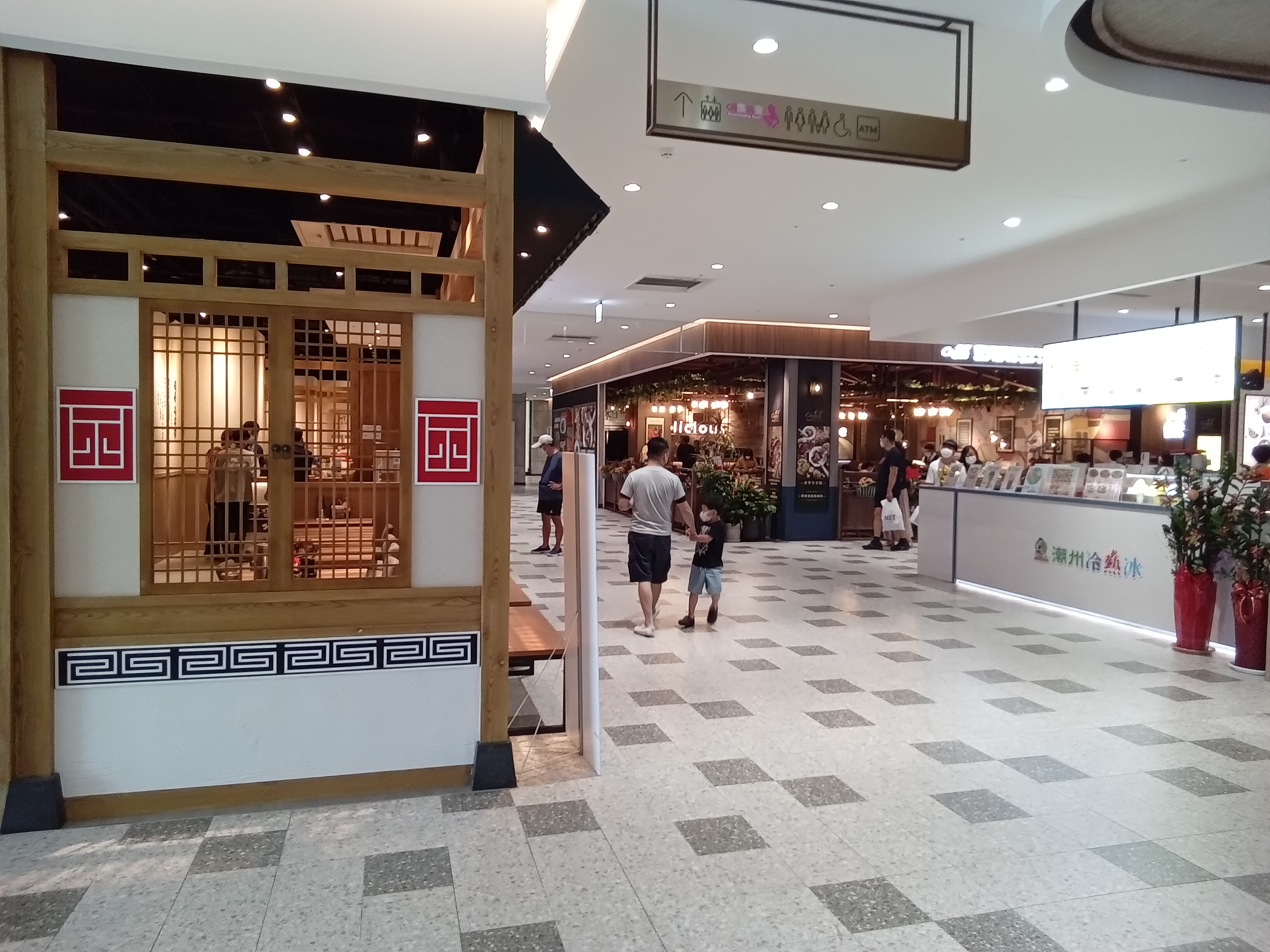
Level 3

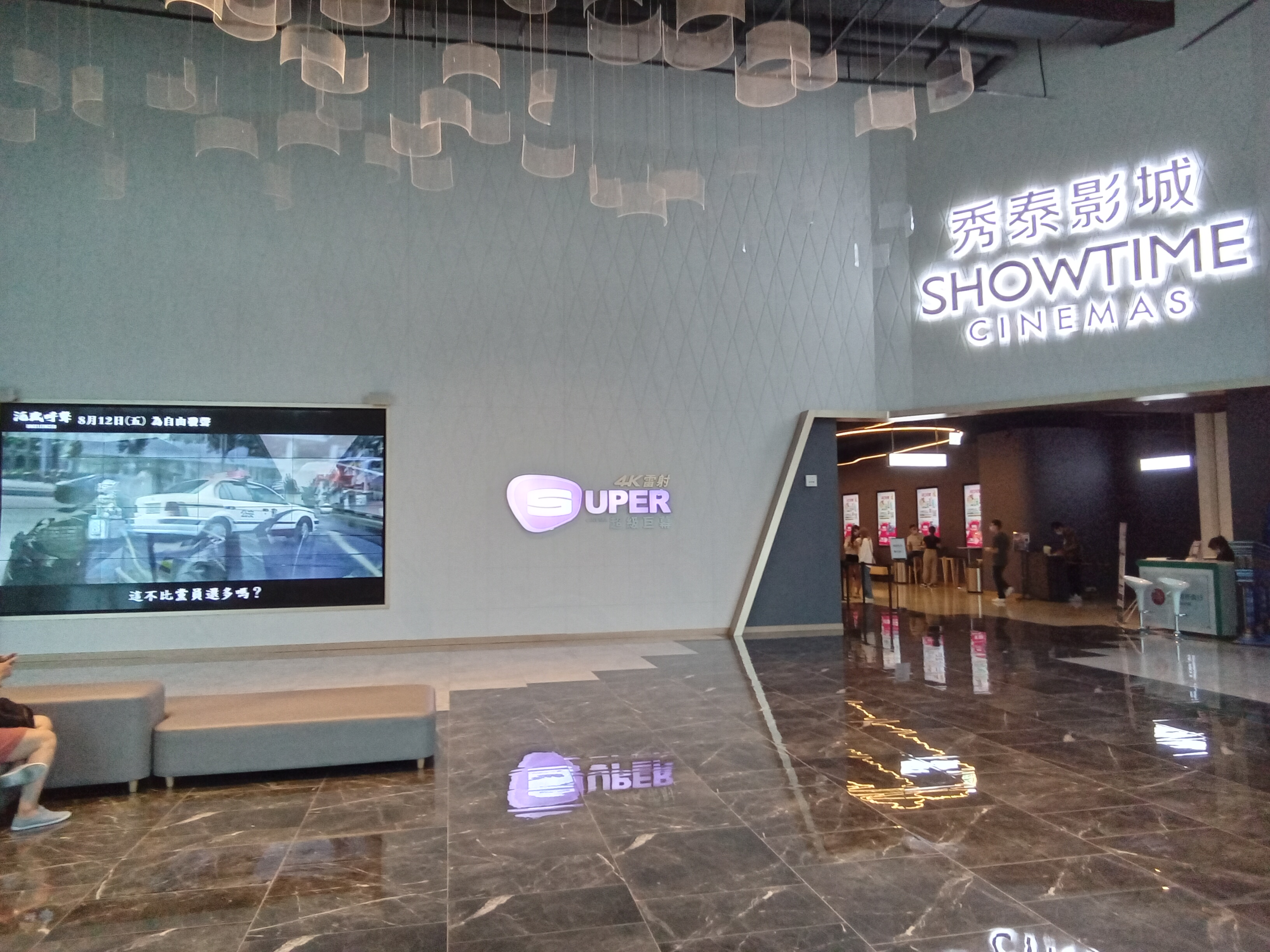
Level 4

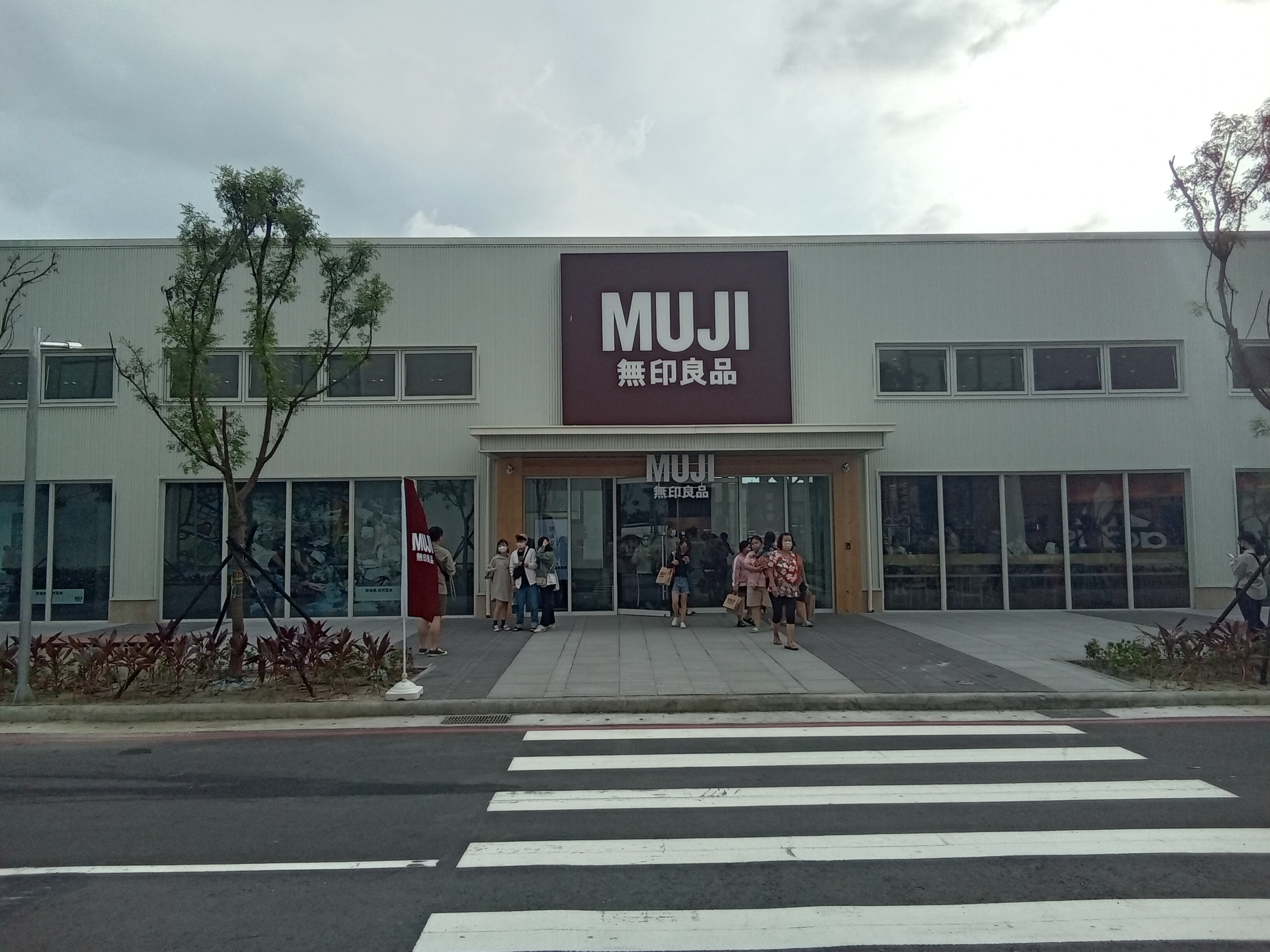
Muji

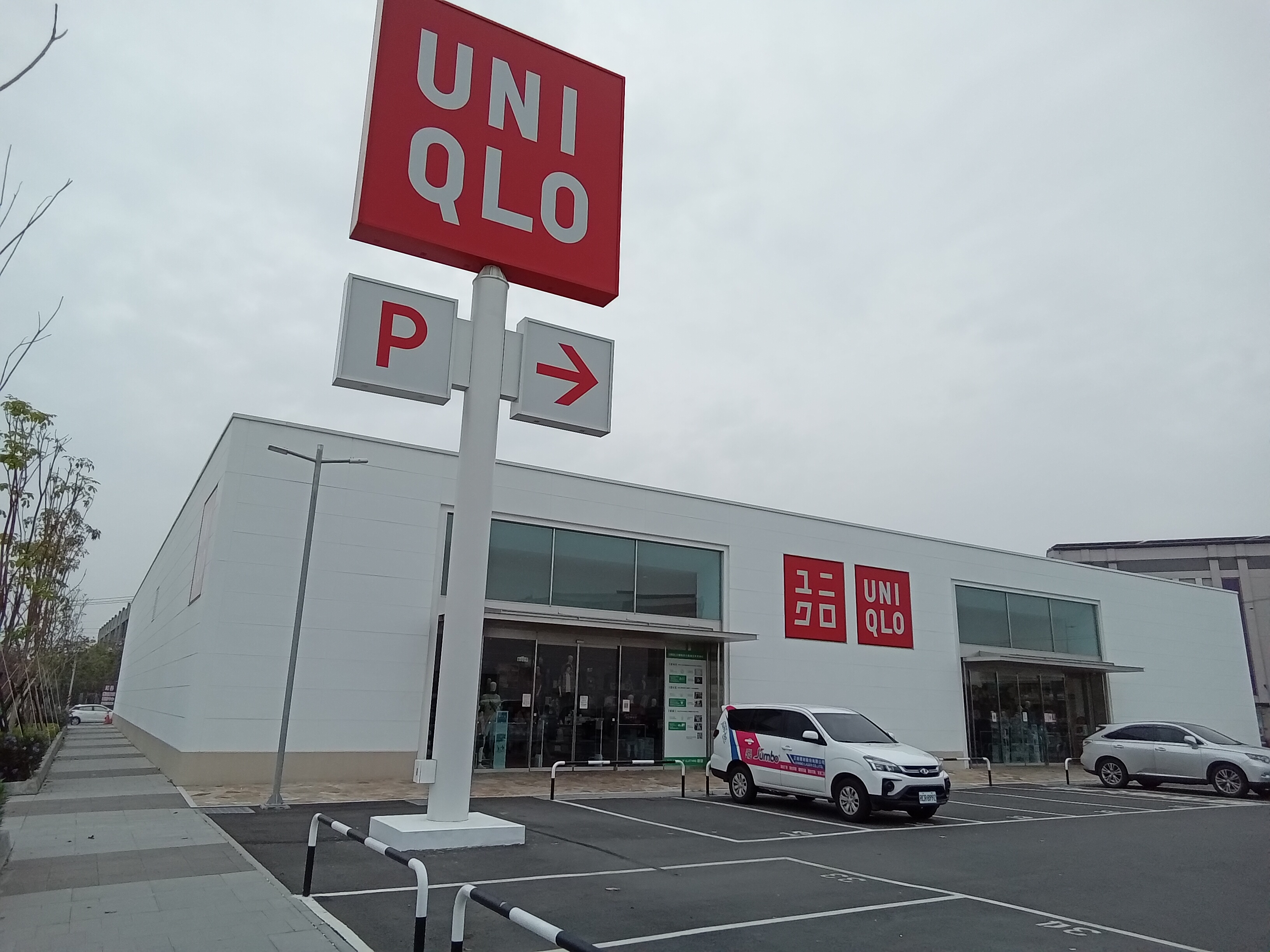
Uniqlo

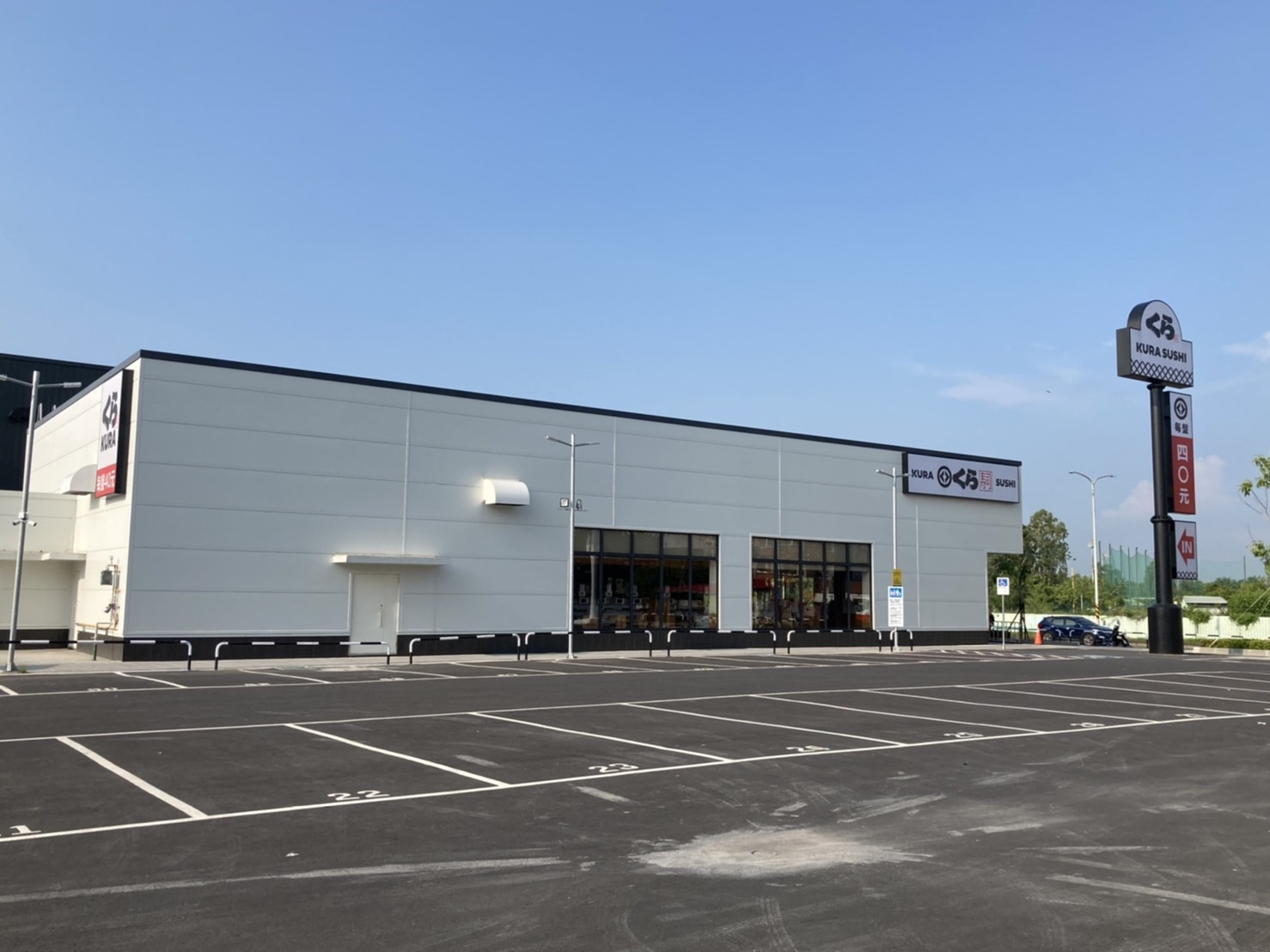
Kura Sushi

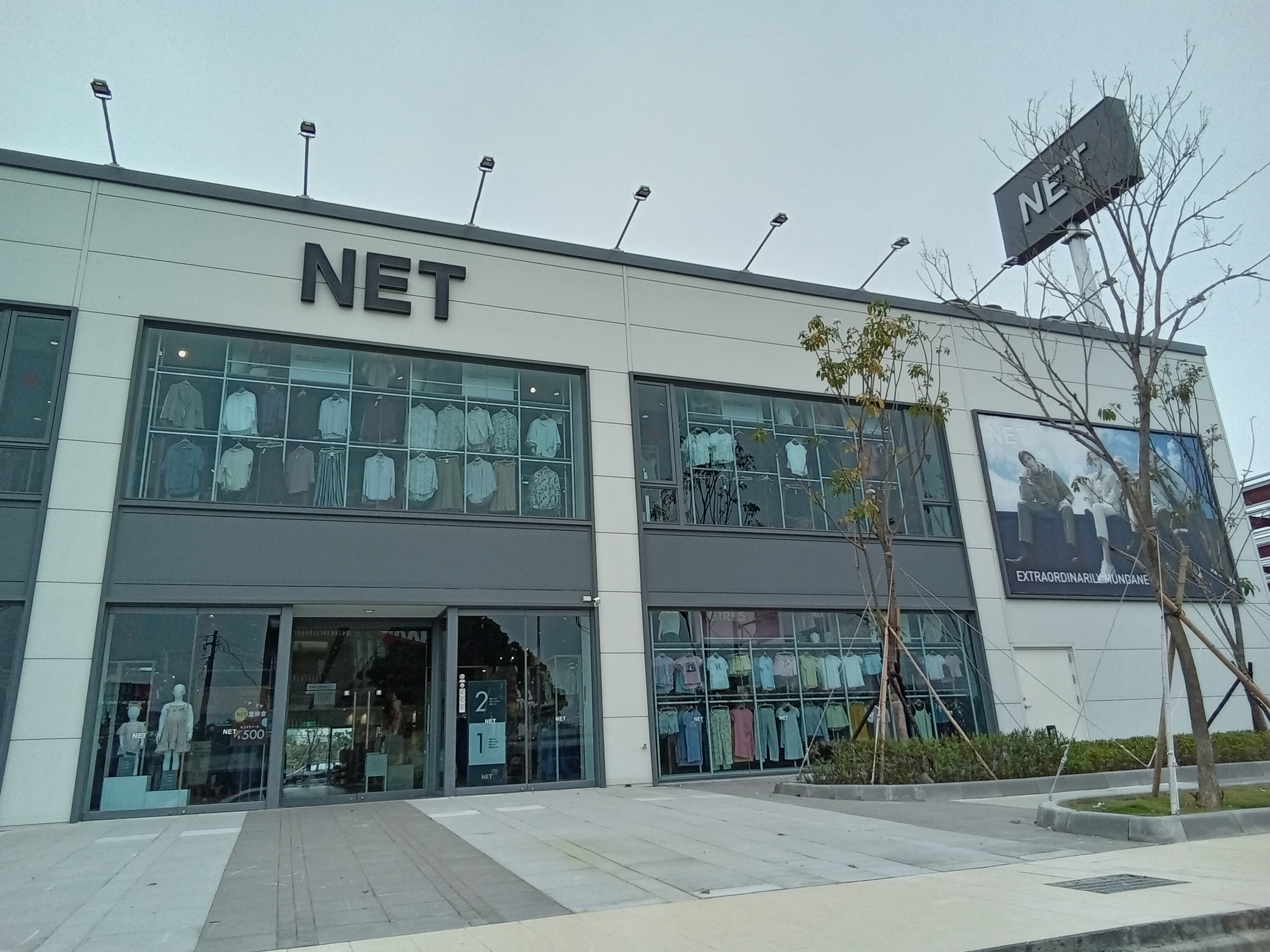
Net

== See also ==
- List of tourist attractions in Taiwan
- Joy Plaza
