= Lihpao Outlet Mall =

- 麗寶Outlet Mall

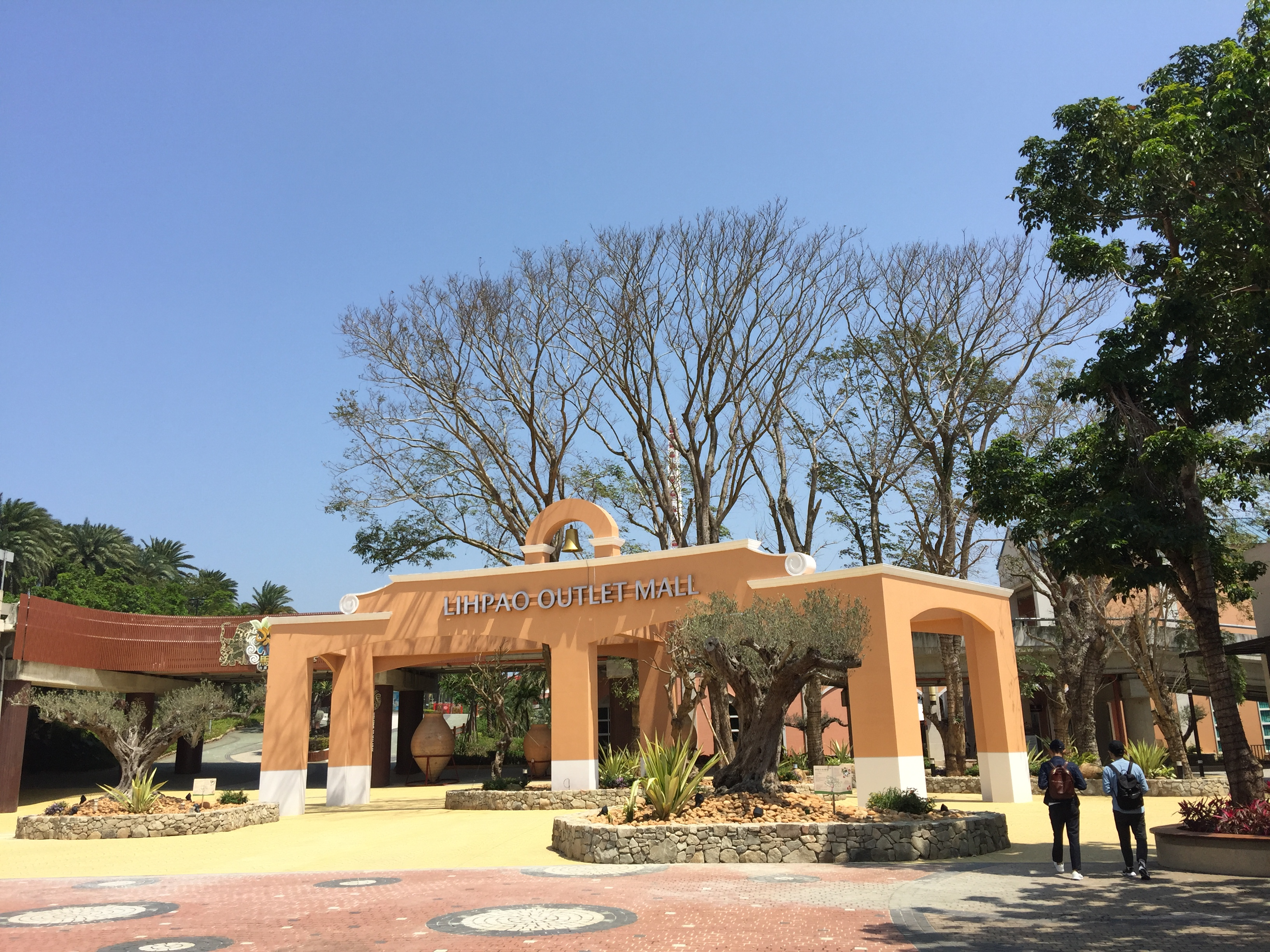
- Location: No. 201, Furong Road, Houli District, Taichung, Taiwan
- Coordinates: 24.324697824668107°N 120.69932032452714°E
- Opened: January 15, 2017
- Num. of stores: 200
- Floor area: 85,800 m^{2} (924,000 sq ft)
- Website: www.lihpaooutlet.com.tw

The Lihpao Outlet Mall (Chinese: 麗寶Outlet Mall) is an outlet shopping mall located in Houli District, Taichung, Taiwan. Lihpao Outlet Mall is a part of the Lihpao Land complex and covers an area of about 5 hectares with a floor area of 85,800 m^{2} (924,000 sq ft). It has introduced about 200 brands and established the only pet-friendly mall in Taiwan. The first phase was designed with the concept of Portofino, Italy. It was put into trial operation on December 24, 2016, and officially opened on January 15, 2017. The second phase of the shopping mall was designed based on the concept of the northern Italian summer resort Lake Como. The entire area has a central canal running through it, plus the lakeside and canal. There is a 3,300 m^{2} (36,000 sq ft) park at the entrance and between the first phase of the shopping mall. There is a sky bridge connection. The second phase of the mall started trial operation on December 25, 2019, and officially opened on January 18, 2020.

== Transportation ==
The mall is accessible by bus from Fengyuan Station of Taiwan Railway.

== Gallery ==
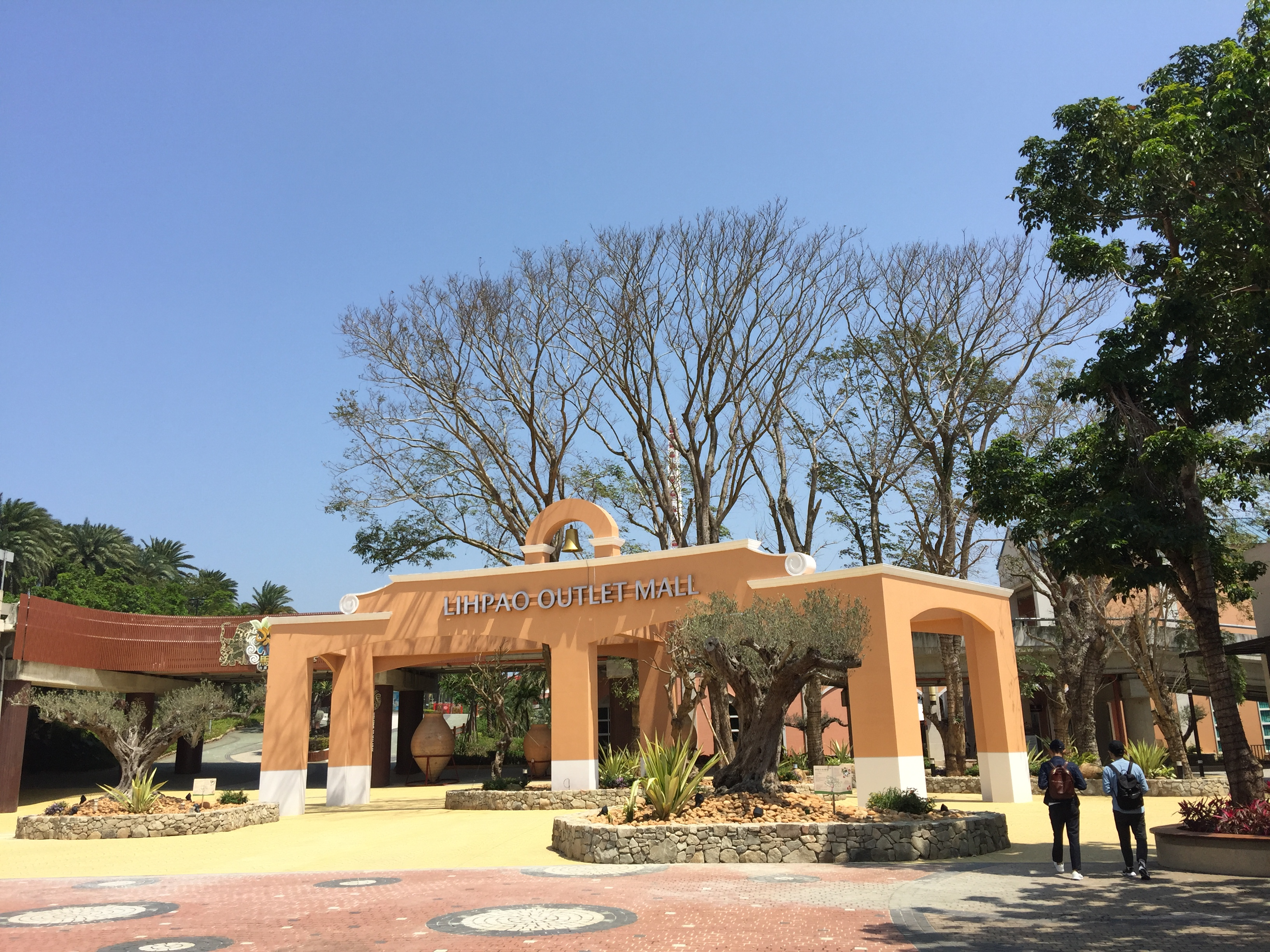
Exterior

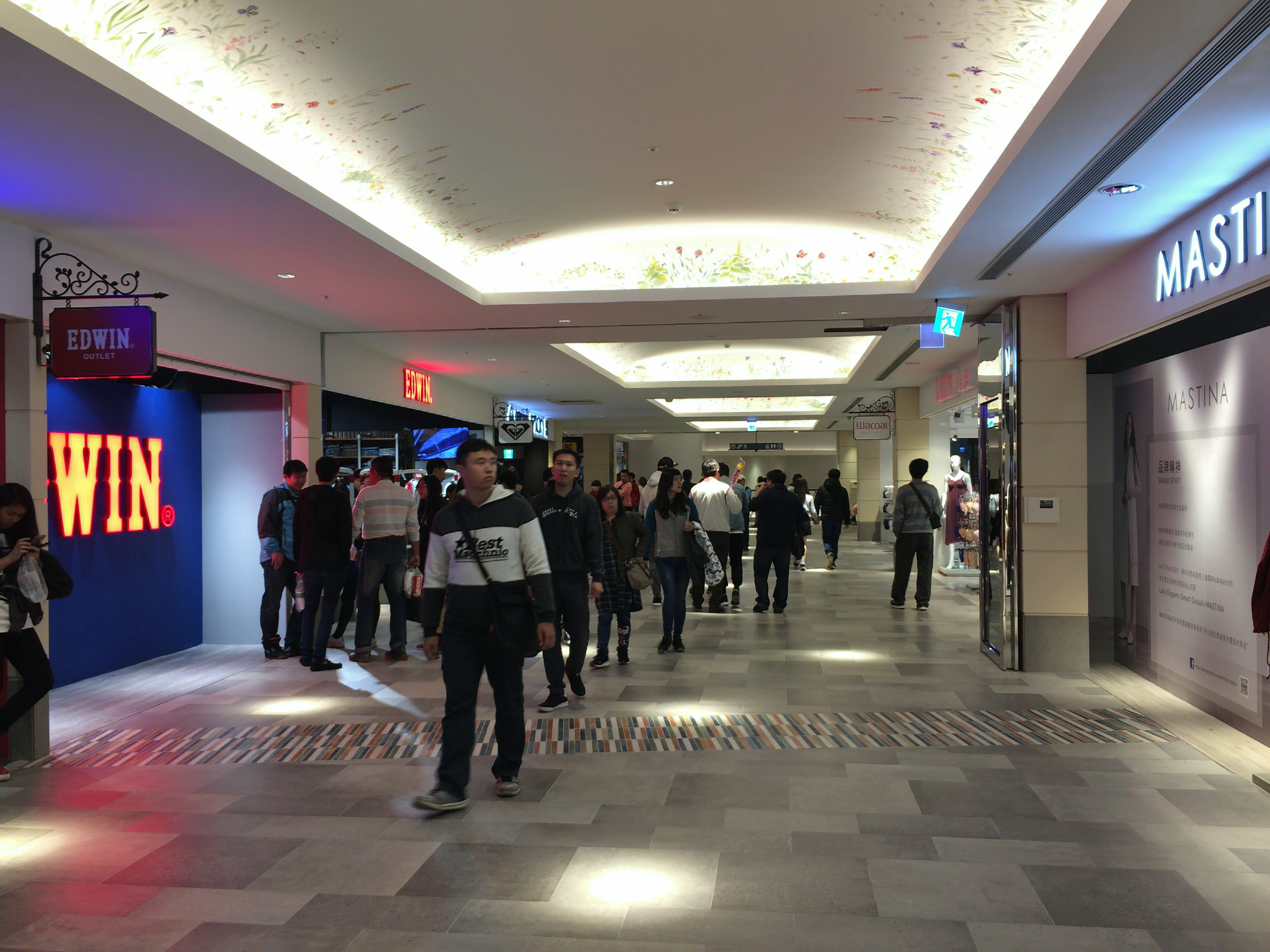
Interior

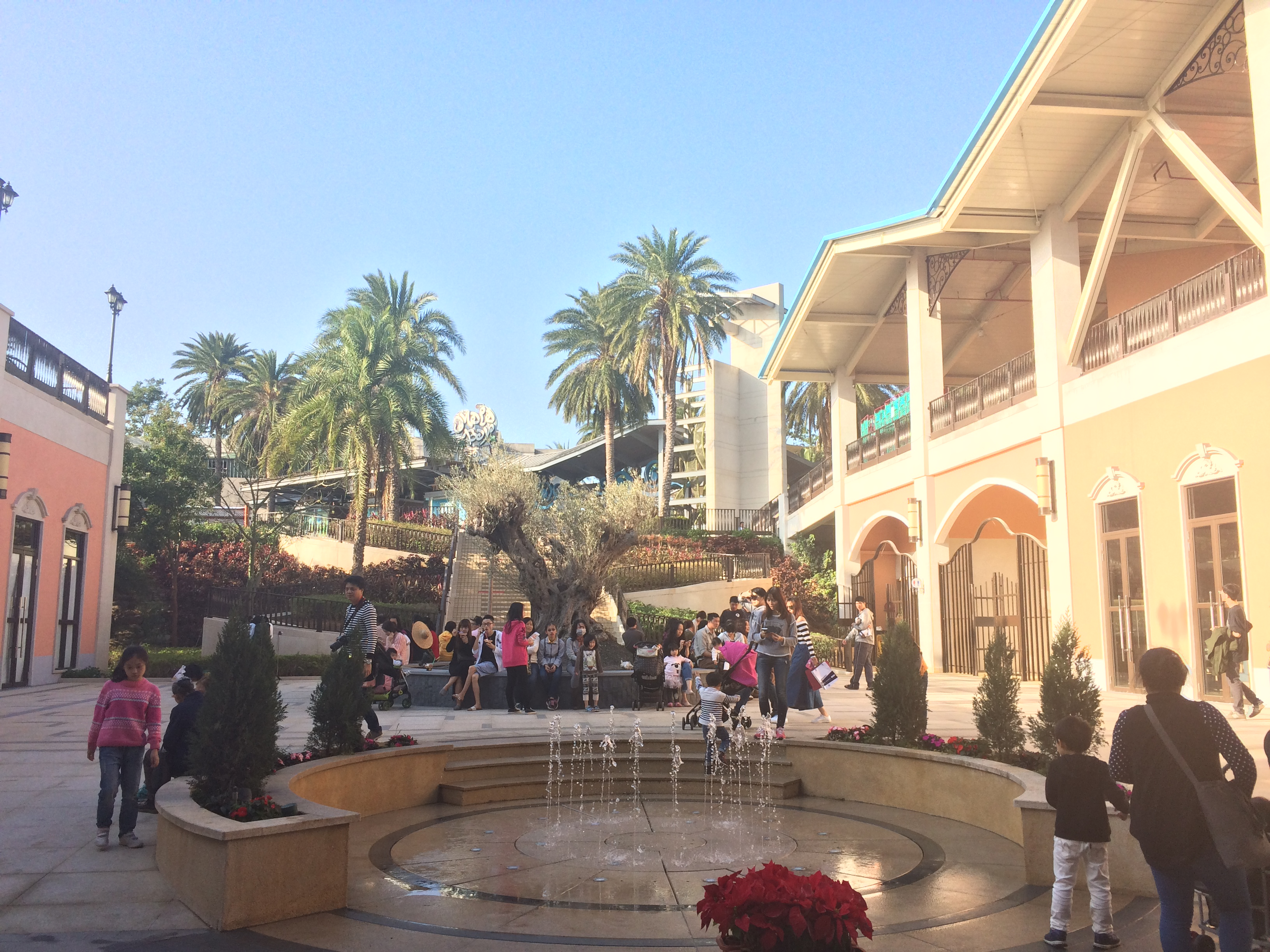
Fountain

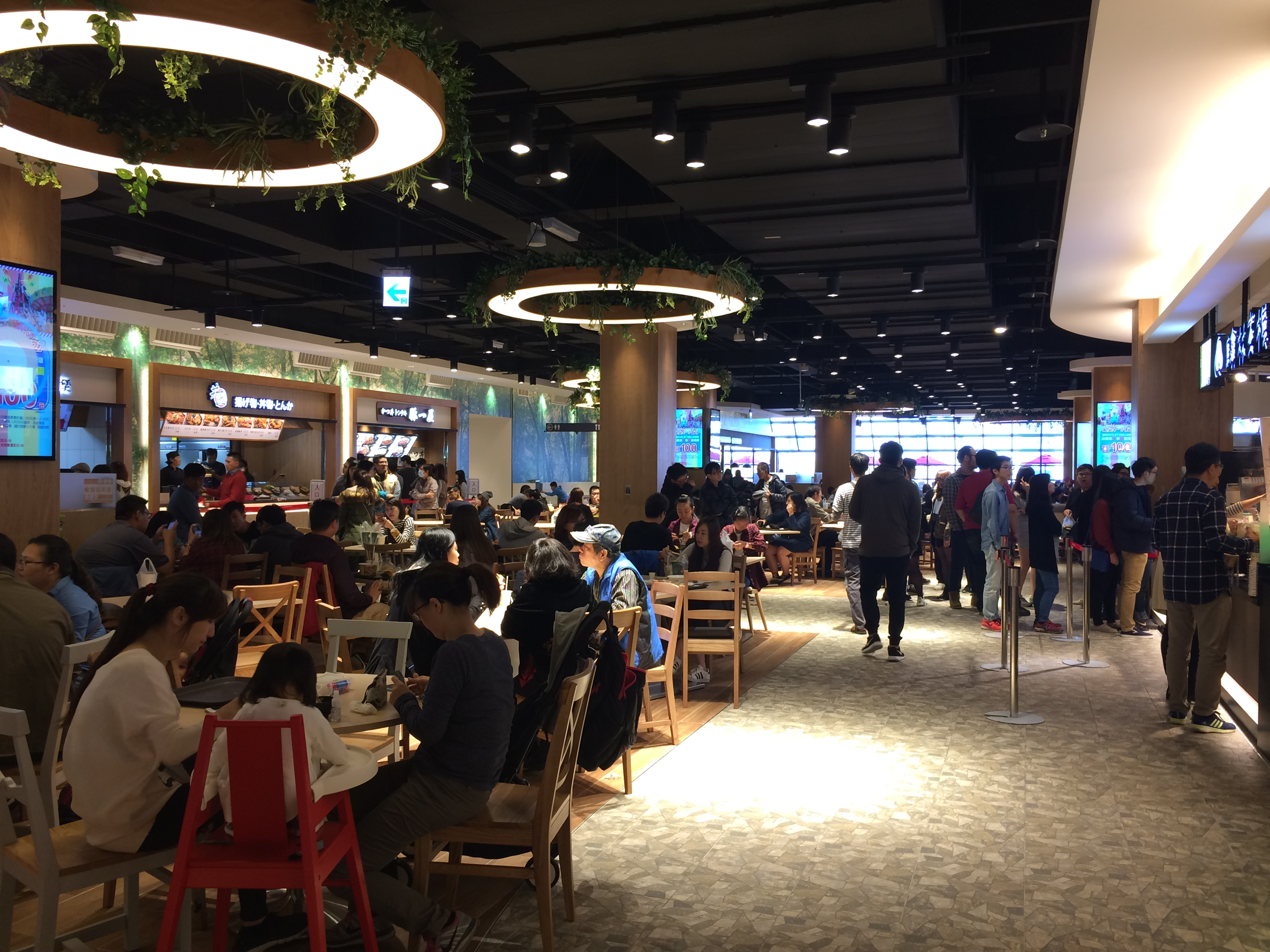
Food Court

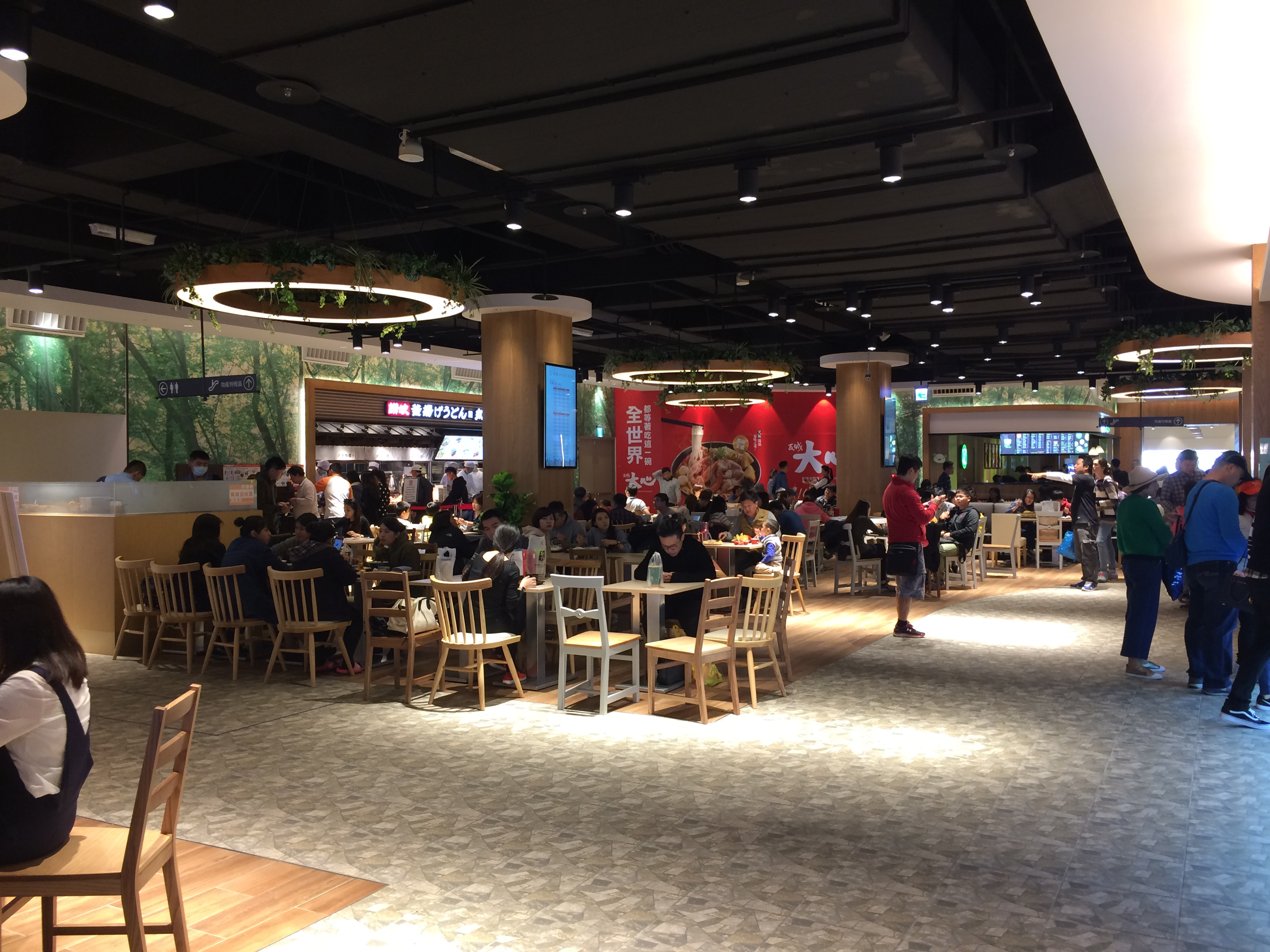
Food Court

== See also ==
- List of tourist attractions in Taiwan
- Lihpao Land
