= List of shopping malls in Taiwan =

This is an incomplete list of shopping malls in Taiwan, sorted by city. Opening year is given in parentheses. As of October 2026, there are 155 malls on this list.

== Taipei ==
- Asiaworld Mall (1990)
- ATT 4 FUN (2011)
- ATT e Life (2018)
- BELLAVITA Shopping Center (2009)
- Breeze A1 Airport MRT Station
- Breeze Academia Sinica (2018)
- Breeze Center (2001)
- Breeze Nan Jing (2013)
- Breeze Nanshan (2019)
- Breeze NTU Hospital (2014)
- Breeze Song Gao (2014)
- Breeze Taipei Station (2007)
- Breeze TSG Hospital (2015)
- Breeze Xinyi (2015)
- Citylink Nangang (2014)
- Citylink Neihu (2018)
- Citylink Songshan (2012)
- Chun Place (2020)
- Core Pacific City (2001)
- CTBC Financial Park Mall (2013)
- Dayeh Takashimaya (1994)
- Diamond Towers (2023)
- Dream Plaza (2025)
- East Metro Mall (2002)
- Edora Park (2014)
- Eslite Spectrum Nanxi (2018)
- Eslite Spectrum Songyan (2024)
- Eslite Spectrum Wuchang (1997)
- Eslite Spectrum Ximen (2007)
- Far Eastern Plaza Mall (1993)
- FEDS Xinyi A13 (2020)
- Garden City (2024)
- Global Mall Nangang Station (2016)
- Guang Hua Digital Plaza (1973)
- Longshan Temple Underground Shopping Mall (2005)
- Ming Yao (1987)
- Miramar Entertainment Park (2004)
- Mitsui Shopping Park LaLaport Nangang (2025)
- Neo19 (2001)
- NOKE (2023)
- Qsquare (2009)
- Shin Kong Mitsukoshi Taipei Nanxi (1991)
- Shin Kong Mitsukoshi Taipei Station (1993)
- Shin Kong Mitsukoshi Taipei Tianmu (2004)
- Shin Kong Mitsukoshi Xinyi Place - A4 (2005)
- Shin Kong Mitsukoshi Xinyi Place - A8 (2001)
- Shin Kong Mitsukoshi Xinyi Place - A9 (2003)
- Shin Kong Mitsukoshi Xinyi Place - A11 (1997)
- Shin Shin Department Store (1972)
- Station Front Metro Mall (2004)
- Syntrend Creative Park (2015)
- Taipei 101 Mall (2004)
- Taipei City Mall (2000)
- TM Midtown (2017)
- Urban One (2010)
- Vieshow Cinemas Xinyi (1998)
- Ximen Metro Mall (2002)
- Zhongshan Metro Mall (1999)

== New Taipei ==
- ASE WeMall (2018)
- Beyond Plaza (2000)
- City Plaza (2015)
- Crown Plaza (2016)
- Eslite Spectrum Banqiao
- Eslite Spectrum Xinban
- Eslite Spectrum Xindian (2023)
- Global Mall Banqiao Station (2010)
- Global Mall Linkou A9 (2017)
- Global Mall Zhonghe (2005)
- HiMall (2013)
- Honhui Plaza (2020)
- iFG Farglory Square (2015)
- JC Park Xinzhuang Store (2015)
- Marina Bay Plaza (2011)
- Mega City (2012)
- Miranew Square (2019)
- Mitsui Outlet Park Linkou (2016)
- Nan Shan Power Center (2003)
- Sanzaru Plaza (2014)
- Shine Square (2015)
- Showtime Live Shulin (2018)
- St. Ignatius Plaza (2012)
- Yes!Life Mall (2023)

== Taoyuan City ==
- Chung Mao Plaza (2016)
- Geleven Plaza (2024)
- Global Mall Taoyuan A8 (2015)
- Global Mall Taoyuan A19 (2021)
- Gloria Outlets (2015)
- JC Park Taoyuan Store (2017)
- JC Park Zhongli Store (2016)
- Landmark Life Plaza (2017)
- Landmark Plaza Taoyuan (2020)
- MetroWalk Shopping Center (2001)
- Shin Kong Mitsukoshi Taoyuan Station (2008)
- TaiMall Shopping Center (1999)
- Tonlin Plaza (1995)

== Hsinchu City ==
- Big City (2012)
- Global Mall Hsinchu (2013)
- J.Piin Mall (2016)
- Taroko Square (2018)

== Zhubei ==
- 6+Plaza (2018)
- FEDS Zhubei (2022)

== Taichung ==
- ASEAN Square (1990)
- Chungyo (1992)
- Dadun11 (2016)
- Hanshin Intercontinental Shopping Plaza (2026)
- JMall (2011)
- Lihpao Outlet Mall (2017)
- Mini G Mall (2026)
- Mitsui Outlet Park Taichung (2018)
- Mitsui Shopping Park LaLaport Taichung (2023)
- Park Lane by CMP (2008)
- Park Lane by Splendor (2012)
- Shin Kong Mitsukoshi Taichung Zhonggan (1996)
- Showtime Live Taichung Station (2017)
- Showtime Live Taichung Wenxin (2018)
- Sunshine Plaza Outlet (2008)
- Taroko Mall (2001)
- Tech Mall (2005)
- Tiger City (2002)
- Top City (2011)

== Chiayi City ==
- Nice Plaza (2006)
- Shin Kong Mitsukoshi Chiayi (2008)
- Showtime Live Chiayi (2016)

== Tainan ==
- Focus Square (2000)
- Mitsui Outlet Park Tainan (2022)
- Shin Kong Mitsukoshi Tainan Zhongshan (1996)
- Shin Kong Mitsukoshi Tainan Place (2002)
- Sugar Mall (2003)
- T.S. Mall (2015)

== Kaohsiung ==
- Dollars Mall (1991)
- Dream Mall (2007)
- E-Da Outlet Mall (2010)
- E Sky Mall (2021)
- Focus 13 Coral Plaza (2025)
- Global Mall Xinzuoying Station (2013)
- Hanshin Department Store (1995)
- Hanshin Arena Shopping Plaza (2008)
- Joy Plaza (2019)
- Lovego Plaza (2022)
- Sanduo Shopping District (1990)
- Shin Kong Mitsukoshi Kaohsiung Sanduo (1993)
- Shin Kong Mitsukoshi Kaohsiung Zuoying (2010)
- SKM Park (2016)
- Talee (1984)
- Treasure Island Shopping Center (1999)

== Pingtung City ==
- Global Mall Pingtung (2012)
- Pacific Department Store Pingtung (1997)

== Elsewhere ==
- Keelung E-Square (2003) in Keelung
- Luna Plaza (2008) in Yilan City, Yilan County
- MOYA Sparkle Shopping Mall (2001) in Keelung
- Pescadores Mall (2013) in Magong City, Penghu County
- Pier 3 (2018) in Magong City, Penghu County
- Shang Shun Mall (2015) in Toufen, Miaoli County
- Showtime Live Taitung (2013) in Taitung City
- Urban Shopping Plaza (2022) in Yilan City, Yilan County
- Wind Lion Plaza (2014) in Jinhu, Kinmen
