= Global Mall Hsinchu =

Shopping mall in East, Hsinchu City, Taiwan

- 環球購物中心新竹世博店

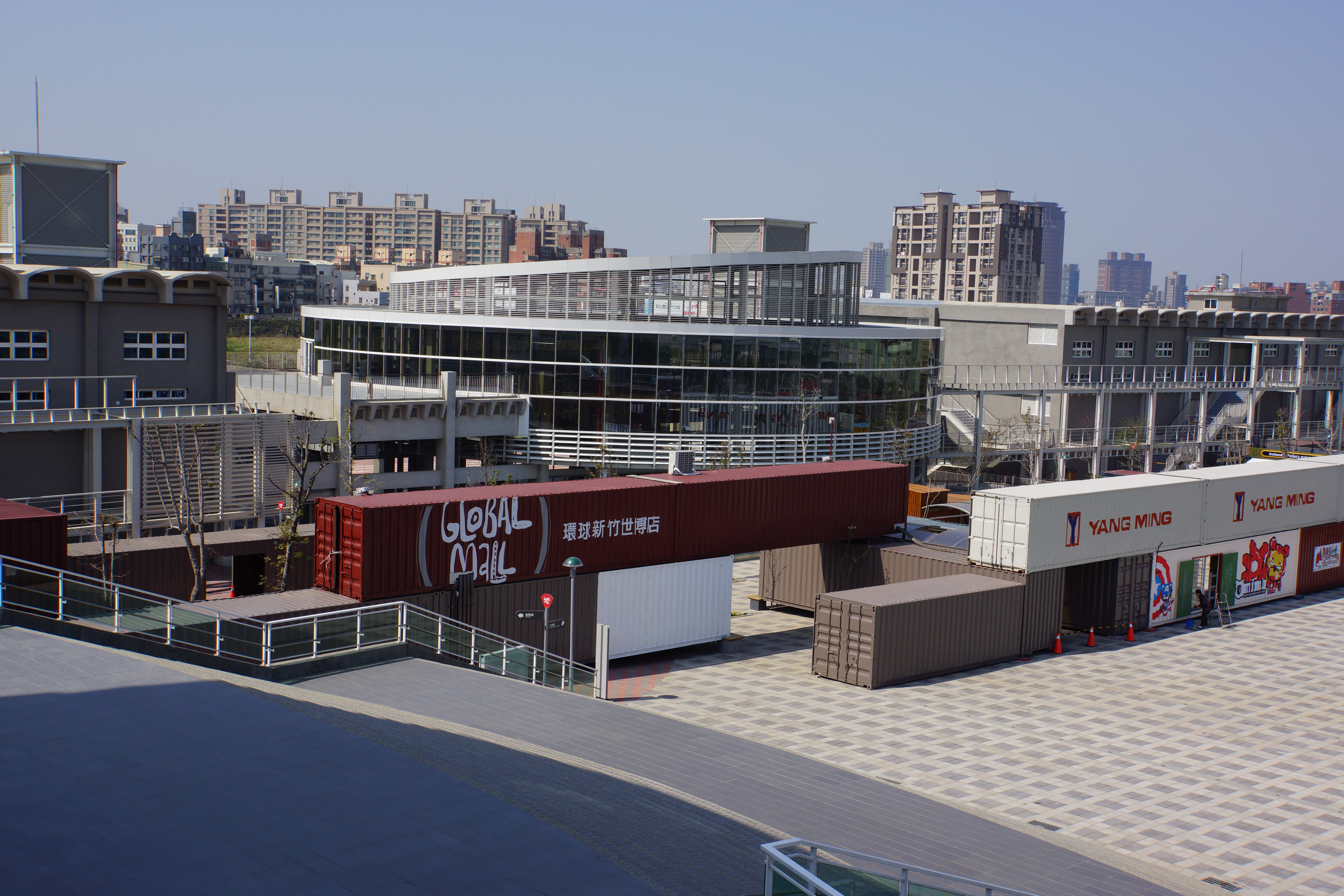
- Location: No. 6, Section 3, Gongdao 5th Road, East District, Hsinchu City, Taiwan
- Coordinates: 22.6734153304074°N 120.49323018613585°E
- Opened: February 21, 2013
- Closed: June 30, 2016
- Website: https://www.twglobalmall.com/

Global Mall Hsinchu (Chinese: 環球購物中心新竹世博店) was a shopping mall in East District, Hsinchu City, Taiwan that opened on February 21, 2013. The mall is located in close proximity to Hsinchu railway station. The mall closed on June 30, 2016.

== History ==
- On February 21, 2013, Global Mall Hsinchu opened, it is the fourth branch store of Global Mall and the second outside New Taipei City.
- On June 30, 2016, the mall ended operations.

== See also ==
- List of tourist attractions in Taiwan
- Global Mall Linkou A9
- Global Mall Taoyuan A8
- Global Mall Pingtung
- Global Mall Xinzuoying Station
- Global Mall Zhonghe
