= City Plaza (New Taipei) =

Shopping mall in Tamsui, New Taipei, Taiwan

- 大都會廣場
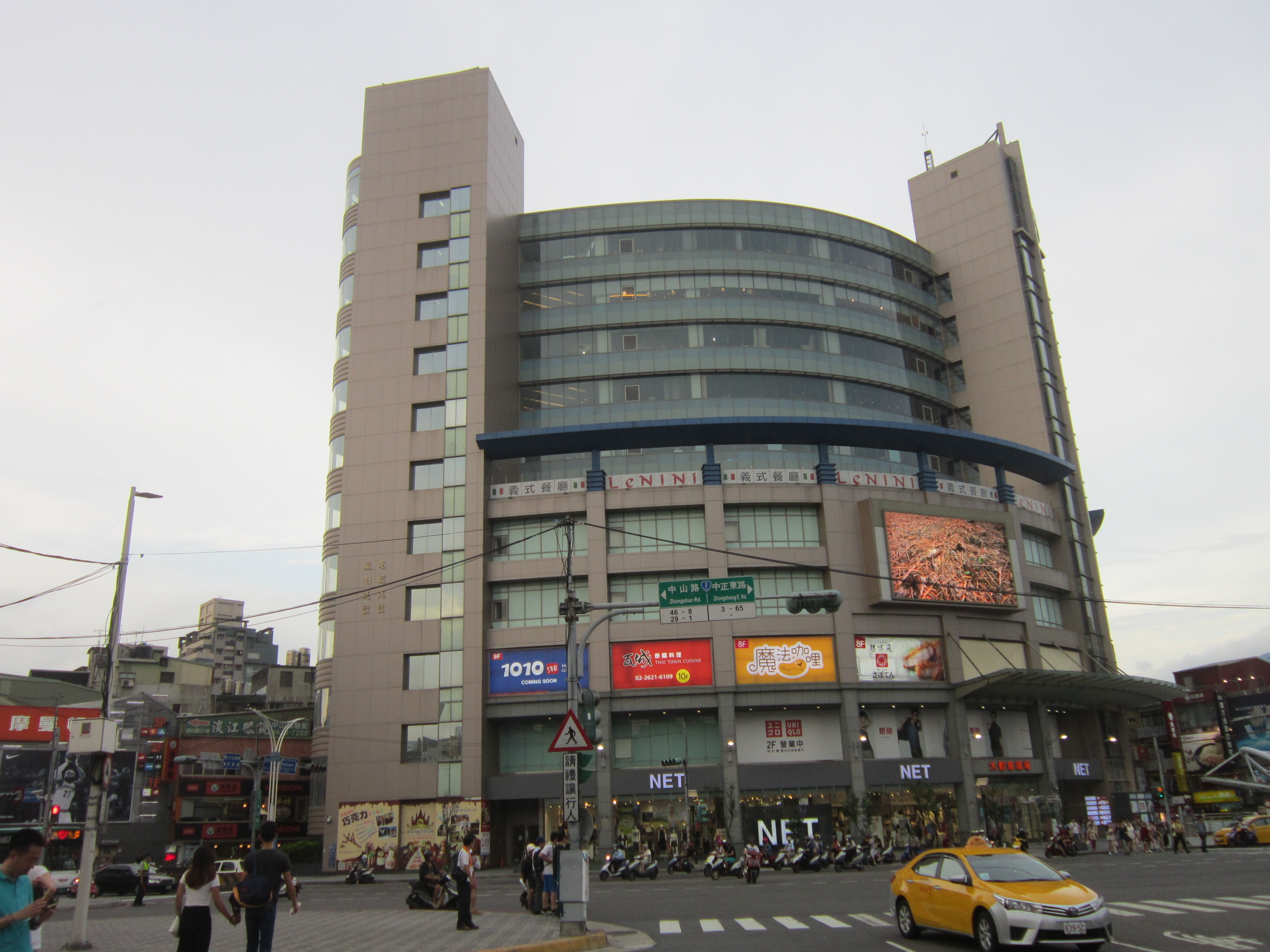
- Location: No. 8, Zhongshan Road, Tamsui, New Taipei, Taiwan
- Coordinates: 25°10′10″N 121°26′42″E
- Opened: June 2015
- Floor area: 10,000 m^{2} (110,000 sq ft)
- Public transit: Tamsui metro station
- Website: https://www.cityplaza.com.tw

City Plaza (Chinese: 大都會廣場; pinyin: Dà Dūhuì Guǎngchǎng) is a shopping center in Tamsui, New Taipei, Taiwan that opened in June 2015. The original name of the mall was Meito Mall, but was later changed to its current name. It is the first and largest shopping mall in the district. The main core stores of the mall include Uniqlo, NET, Owndays, and Kura Sushi. The mall is located in close proximity to Tamsui metro station on the Red Line of the Taipei Metro.

== Floor Guide ==
Floor	Features
Levels 5 to 10	Various restaurants including Kura Sushi, Magic Curry and Thai Town Cuisine
Level 4	Tom's World Amusement Center
Level 3	Restaurants
Level 2	Uniqlo
Level 1	Net clothing store, Owndays
B1	Net clothing store
B2 to B4	Car park

== See also ==
- List of tourist attractions in Taiwan
- List of shopping malls in Taiwan
