= Hanshin Arena Shopping Plaza =

Shopping mall in Zuoying, Kaohsiung, Taiwan

- 漢神巨蛋購物廣場

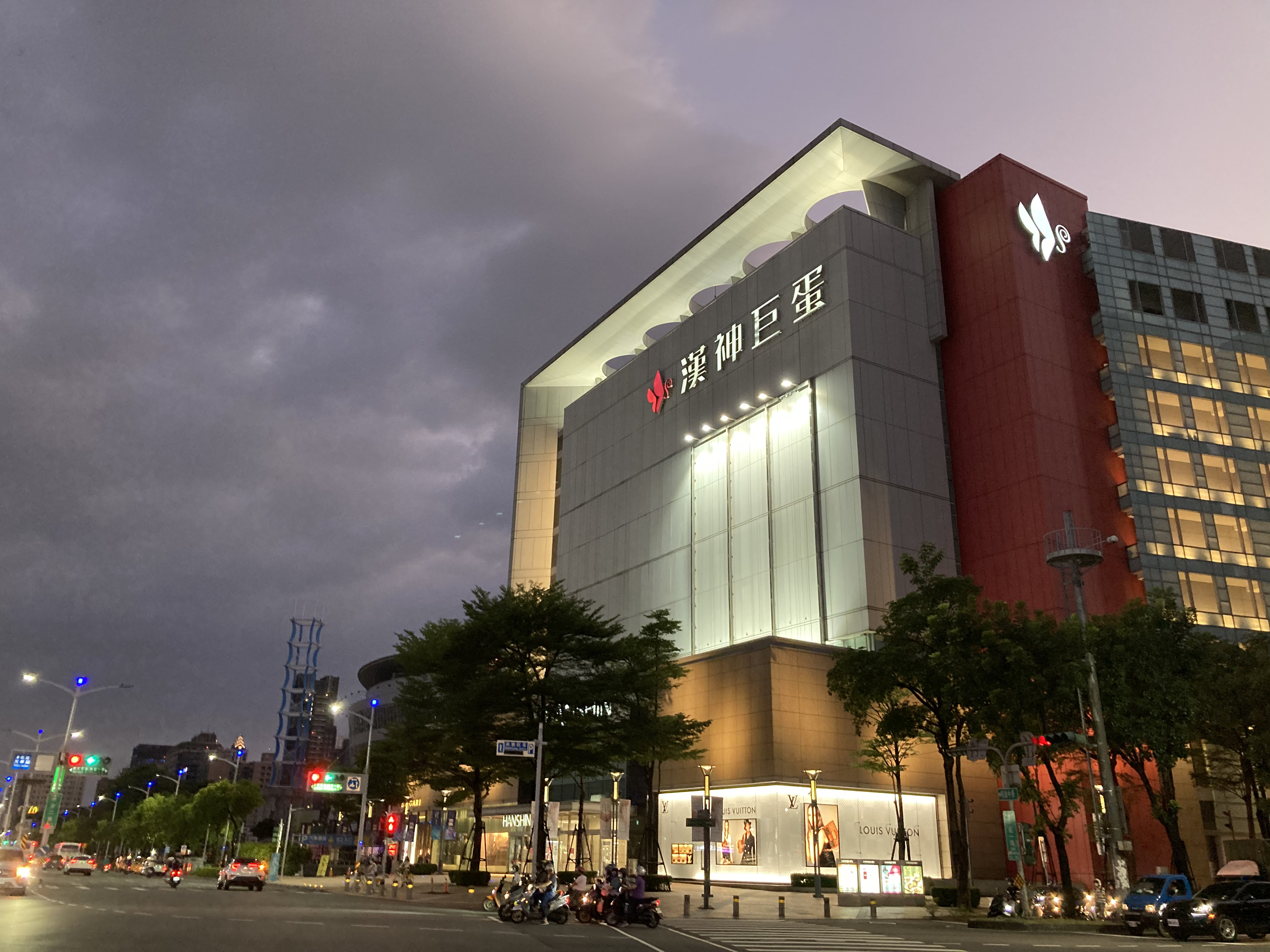
- Hanshin Arena Shopping Plaza (2021)
- Location: No. 777, Boai 2nd Road, Zuoying District, Kaohsiung, Taiwan
- Coordinates: 22.6698°N 120.3022°E
- Opened: July 10, 2008
- Developer: Hanshin Department Store Co., Ltd.
- Manager: Hanshin Department Store Co., Ltd.
- Floor area: 100,000 m^{2} (1,100,000 sq ft)
- Floors: 9 floors above ground 1 floor below ground
- Parking: 1465 parking spaces
- Website: www.hanshin.com.tw

Hanshin Arena Shopping Plaza (Chinese: 漢神巨蛋購物廣場) is a shopping mall in Zuoying District, Kaohsiung, Taiwan that opened on July 10, 2008. The total floor area of the mall interior is about 100,000 m^{2} (1,100,000 sq ft). It has been the shopping mall with the highest annual revenue in Kaohsiung since 2012. The mall is located in close proximity to the Kaohsiung Arena, which was opened in the same year, and is walking distance from the Kaohsiung Arena metro station.

== History ==
- Construction began in August 2004.
- Construction completed in July 2008.
- Trial operation began on July 8, 2008.
- Hanshin Arena Shopping Plaza officially opened on July 10, 2008.
- In 2014, Hanshin Shopping Plaza opened a branch store in Xi'an, China. The mall is operated by Xi'an Hanshin Department Store Co., Ltd. The total floor area of the shopping mall is about 120,000 m^{2} (1,300,000 sq ft), with a cinema, KTV and banquet halls. The cinema has 13 halls and 2,000 seats. The catering industry accounts for 25% to 30% of the total area.

== Gallery ==
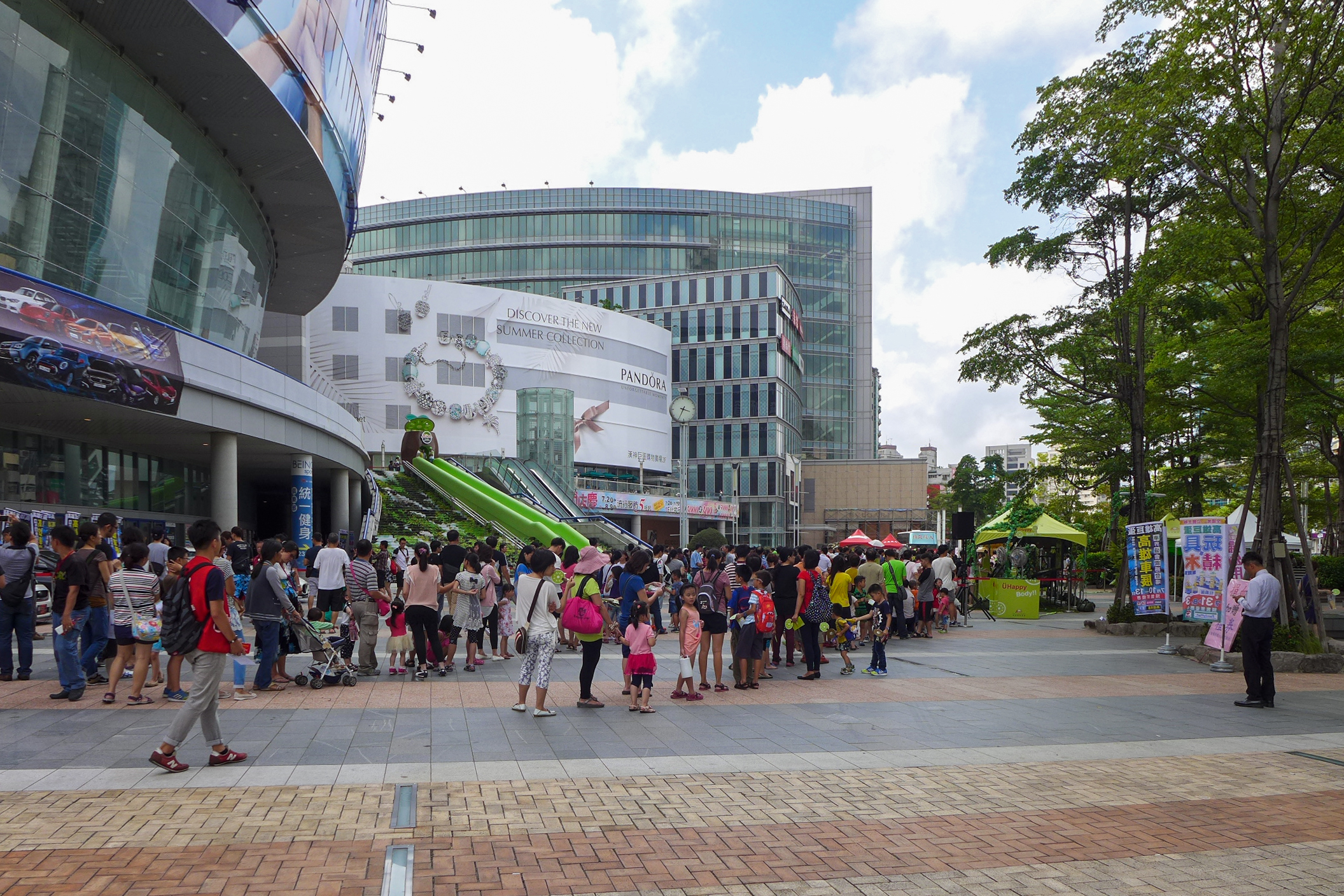
Exterior

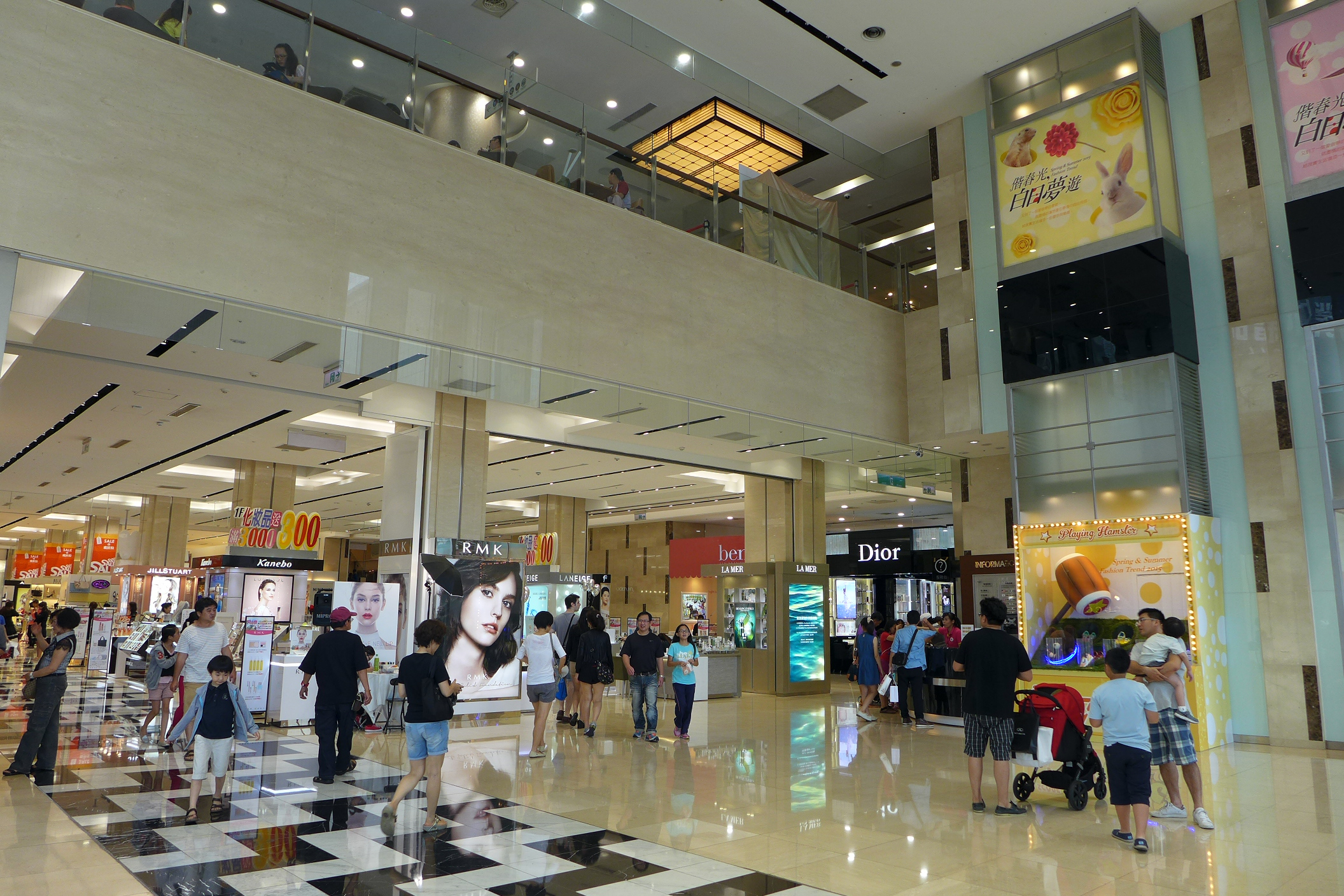
Entrance Void

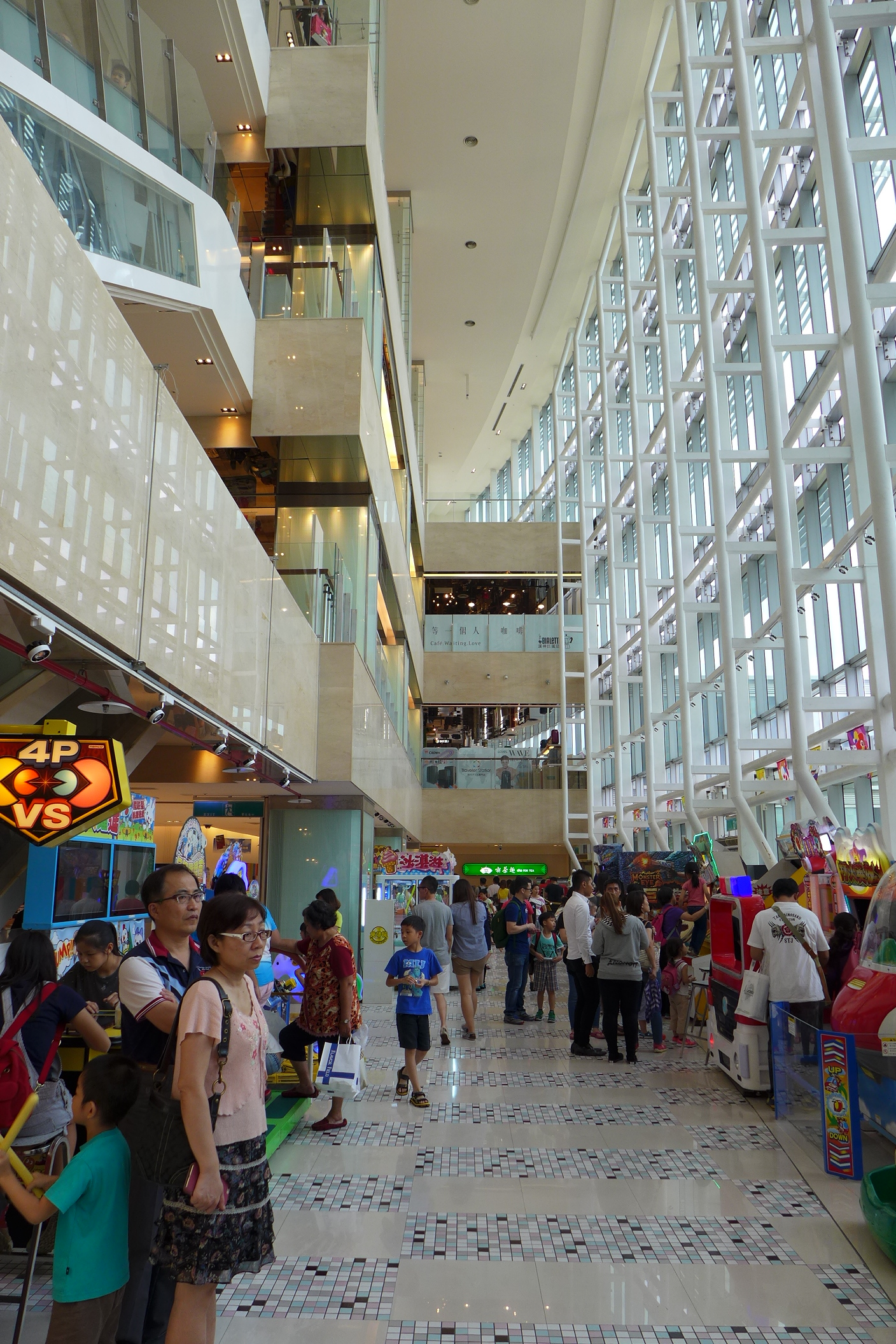
Atrium of the mall

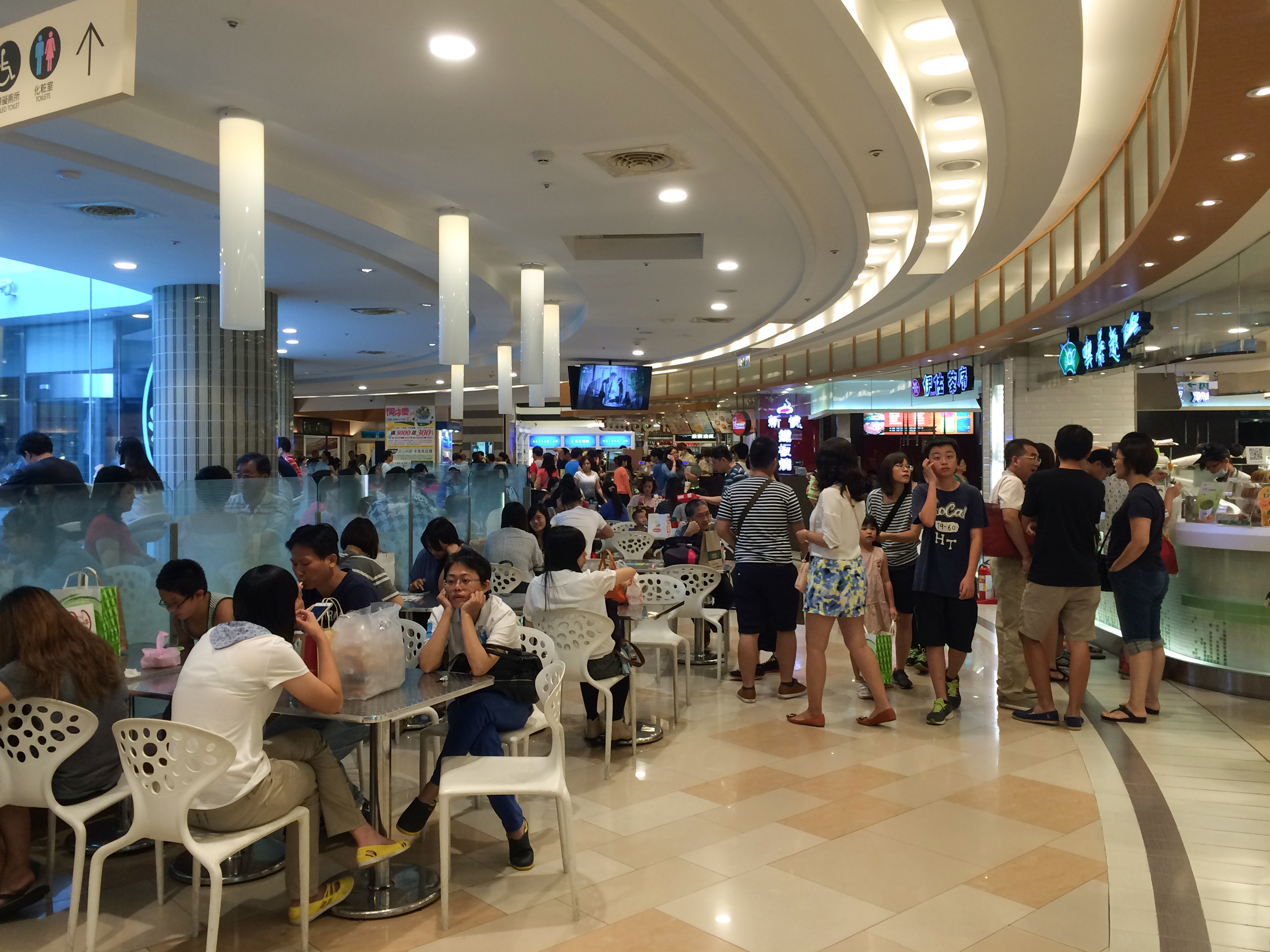
B1 Food Court

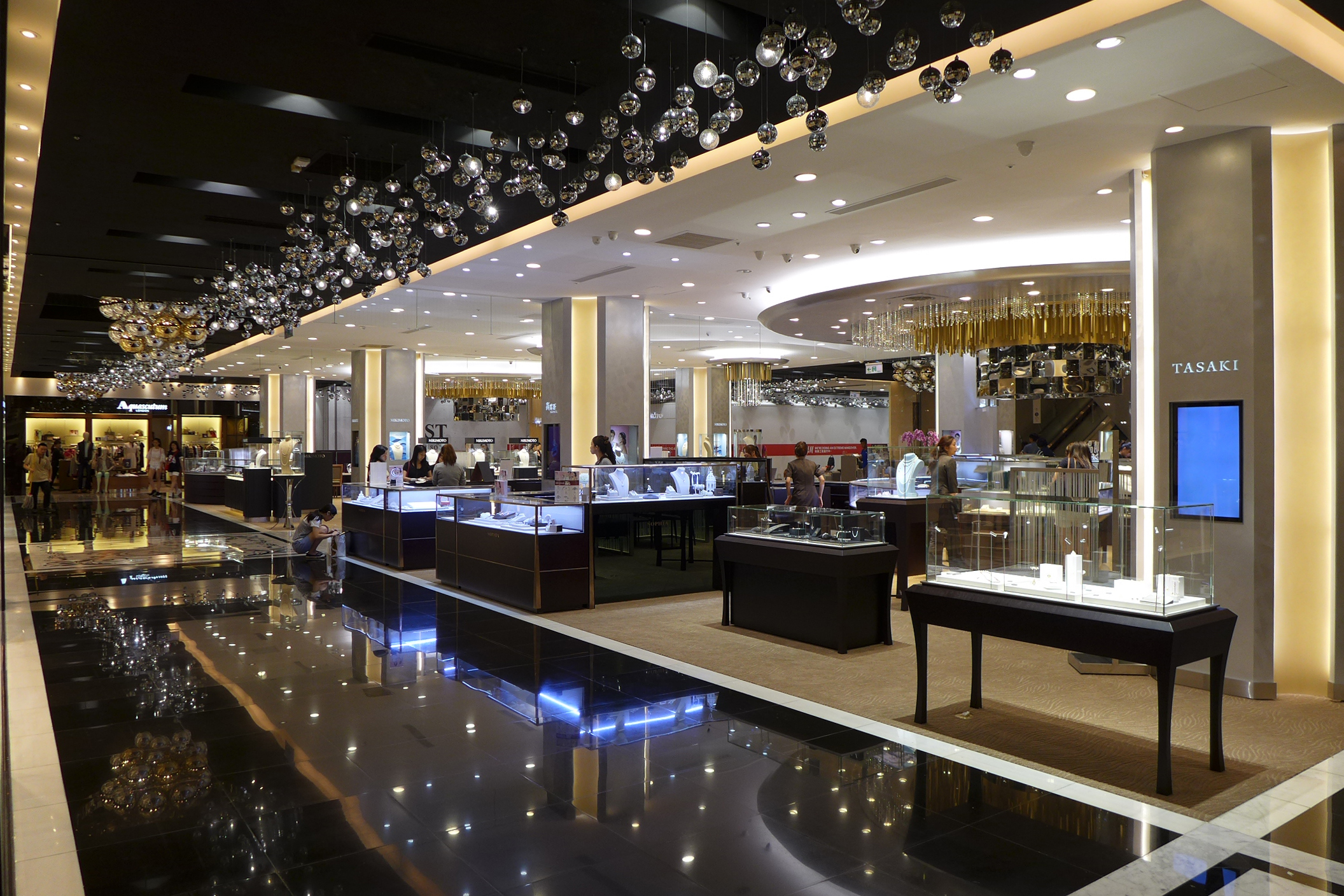
Level 2 Shops

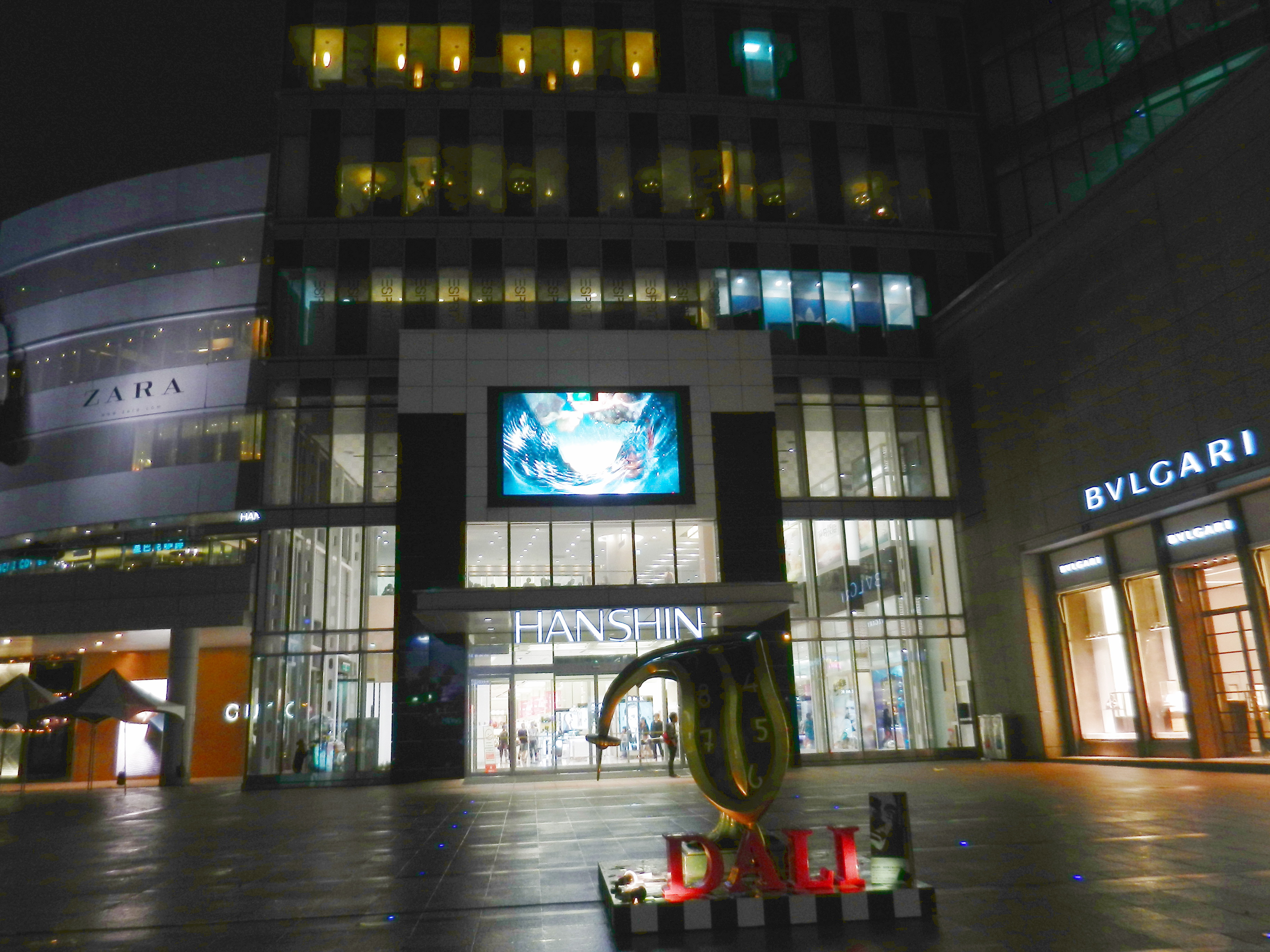
Entrance

== See also ==
- List of shopping malls in Taiwan
- Hanshin Intercontinental Shopping Plaza
