= Global Mall Linkou A9 =

Shopping mall in Linkou, New Taipei, Taiwan

- 環球購物中心林口A9

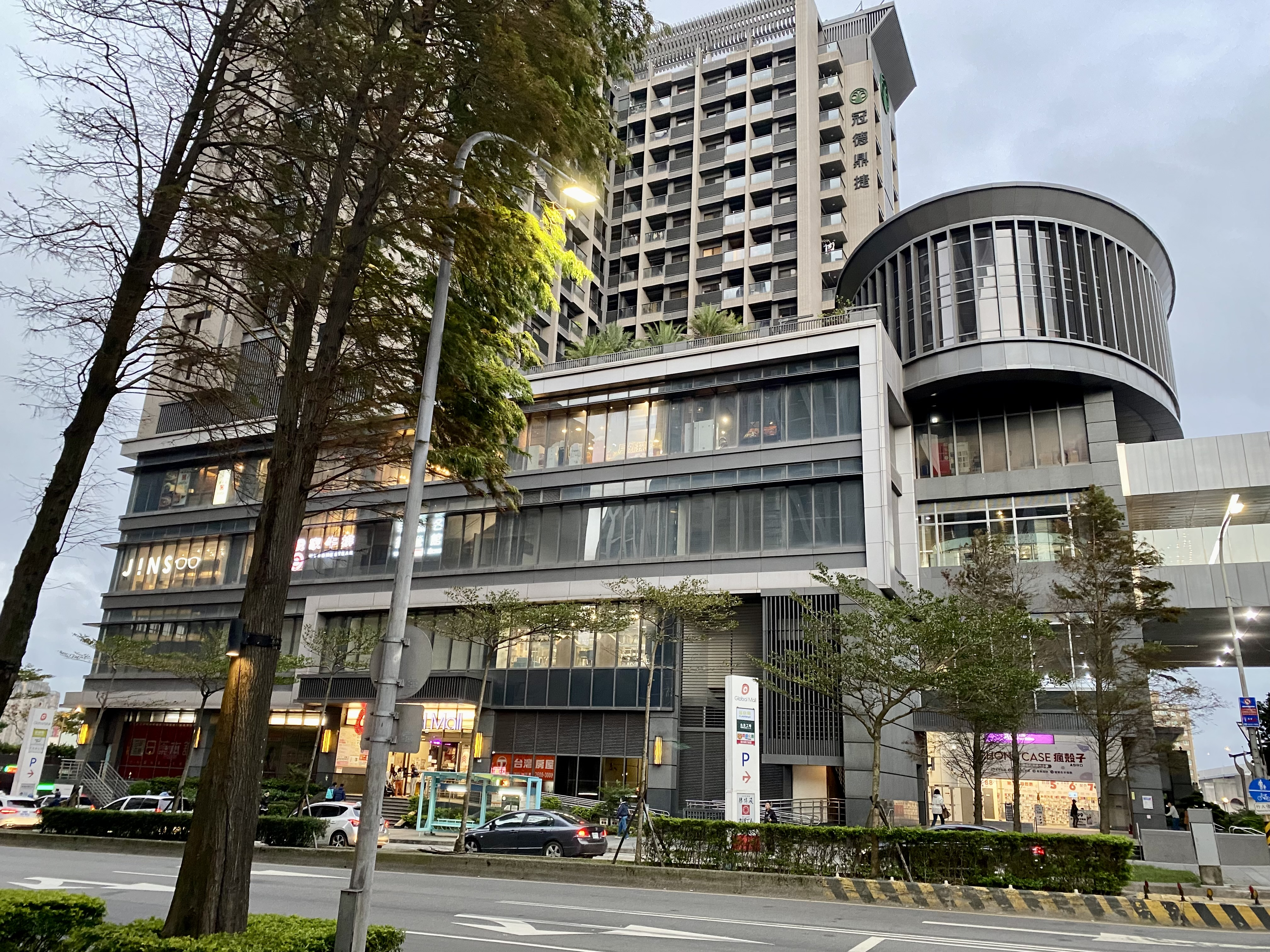
- Location: No. 2, Section 1, Wenhua Third Road, Linkou District, New Taipei, Taiwan
- Coordinates: 25°4′5″N 121°21′41″E
- Opened: 25 May 2017
- Floor area: 4,950 m^{2} (53,300 sq ft)
- Floors: 2 floors above ground 4 floor below ground
- Public transit: Linkou metro station
- Website: https://www.twglobalmall.com/

Global Mall Linkou A9 (Chinese: 環球購物中心林口A9) is a shopping mall in Linkou District, New Taipei, Taiwan that opened on May 25, 2017. With a total floor area of 4,950 m^{2} (53,300 sq ft), the mall is located inside Linkou metro station. It is the eighth store of Global Mall.

== See also ==
- List of tourist attractions in Taiwan
- Global Mall Nangang Station
- Global Mall Banqiao Station
- Global Mall Taoyuan A8
- Global Mall Xinzuoying Station
- Global Mall Pingtung
- Global Mall Zhonghe
