= ASEAN Square =

Shopping center in Taichung, Taiwan

- 東協廣場
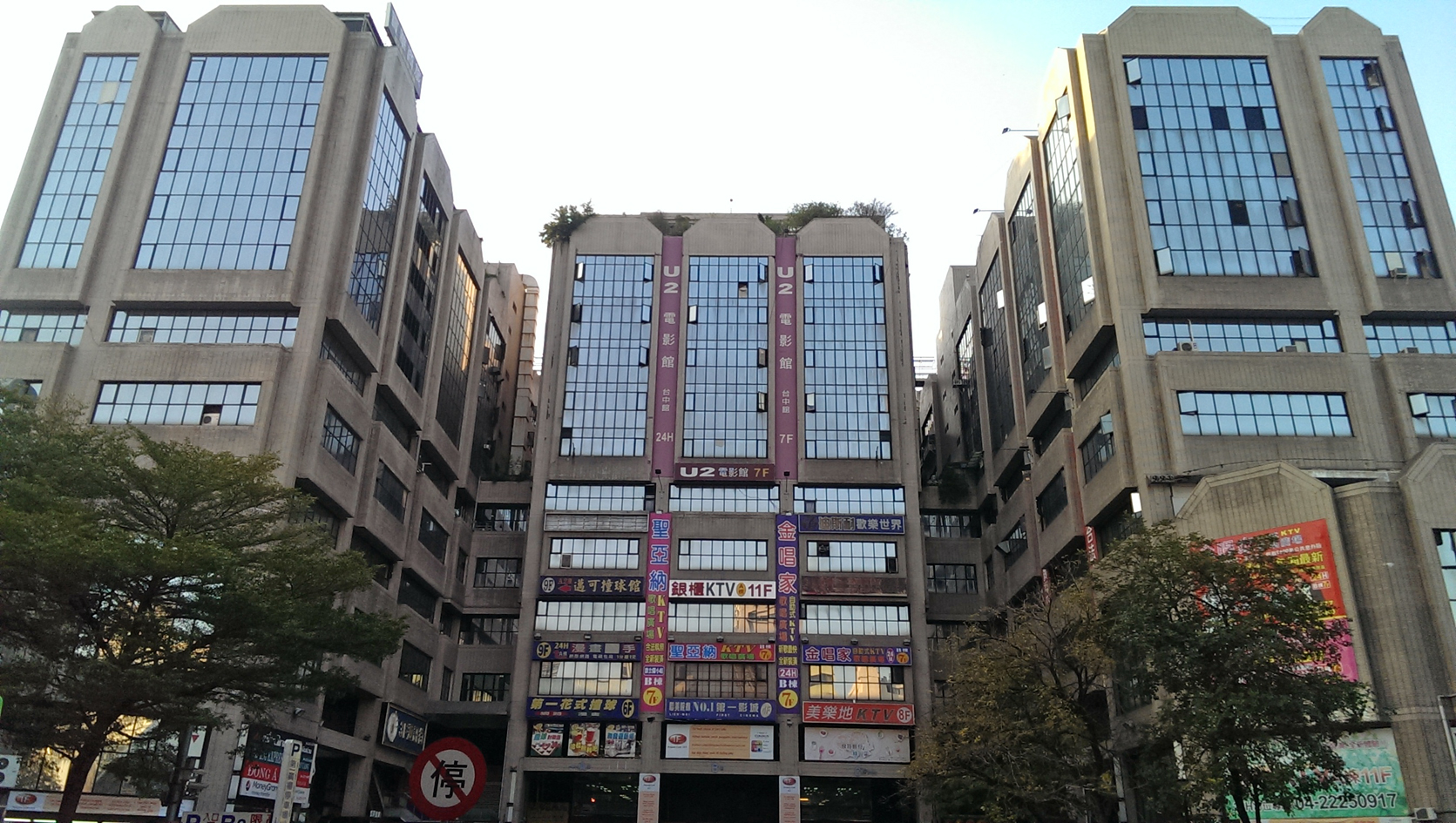
- Location: No. 135, Luchuan West Street, Central District, Taichung, Taiwan
- Coordinates: 24.139525668938653°N 120.68389065521191°E
- Opened: 1990
- Floor area: 96,321.95 m^{2} (1,036,800.8 sq ft)
- Floors: 13 floors above ground, 3 floor below ground
- Public transit: Taichung railway station

ASEAN Square (Chinese: 東協廣場) is a shopping center located in Central District, Taichung, Taiwan. The mall opened in 1990 and is located in close proximity to Taichung railway station.

== History ==
ASEAN Square was originally the First Public Market during the Japanese colonial period. Its history can be traced back to 1908 when the Taichung City Public First Market was opened. On October 22, 1978, a fire broke out. The city government established the First Market Reconstruction Team to promote the reconstruction plan of the market, converting it into a comprehensive leisure and entertainment building called First Square. In 1987, the construction of the First Square officially started, and it was completed in 1990. In 1991, it was rebuilt again and became what the building looks like today.

In 1995, due to frequent fires at that time, the government strengthened fire safety inspections, which led to a sharp drop in the crowd. The departure of the Taiwanese allowed Southeast Asian foreign workers in Taiwan in the early 2000s to find a holiday gathering place, and Southeast Asian shops started to open in the mall.

In October 2010, the Southeast Asian Shopping and Food Court was officially established on the second floor of the mall.

In March 2016, the Taiwan International Labor Association (TIWA) entered the First Square. On 6 July 2016, the Taichung City Government renamed the First Square to ASEAN Square.

== Gallery ==
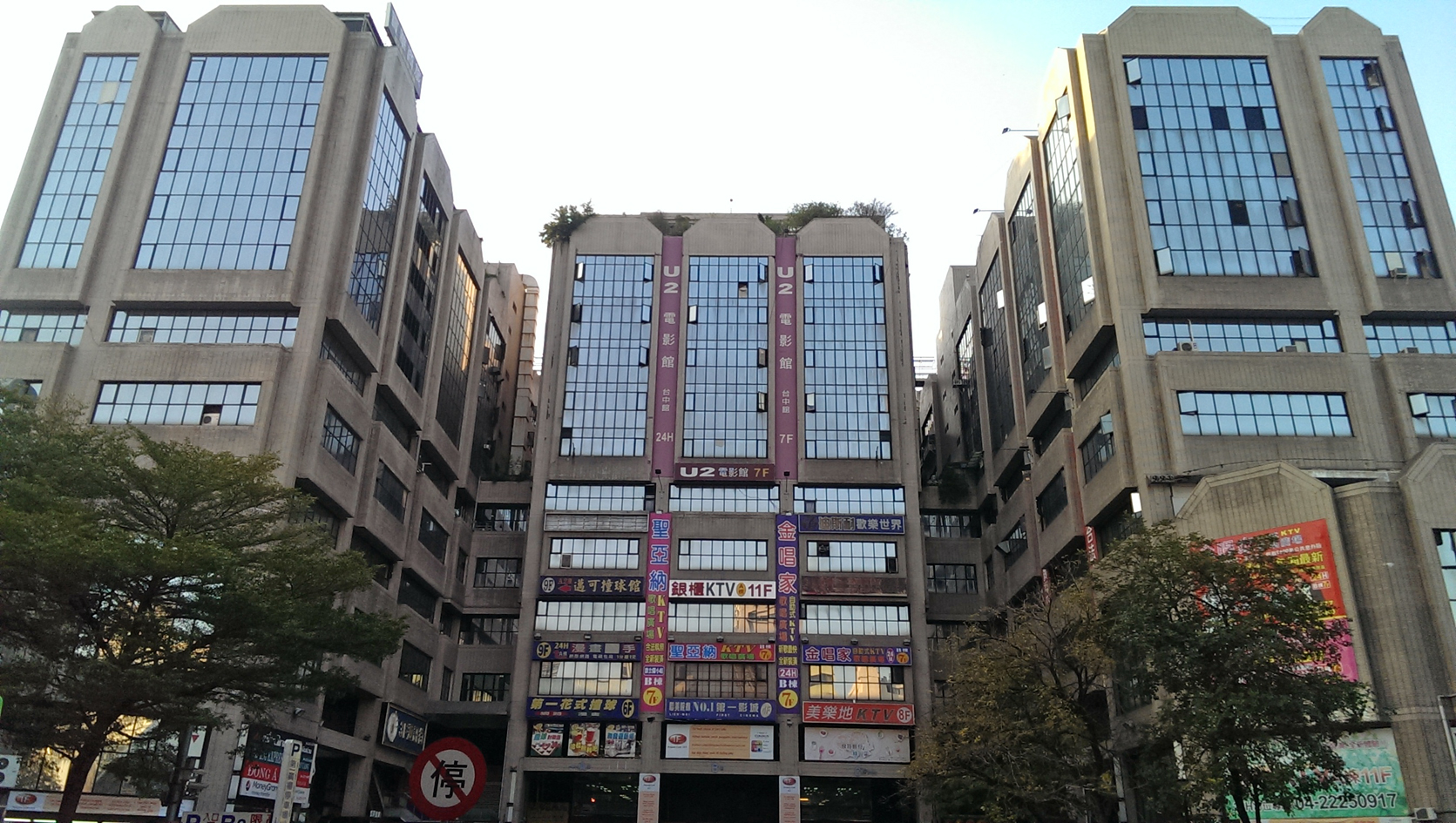
Exterior

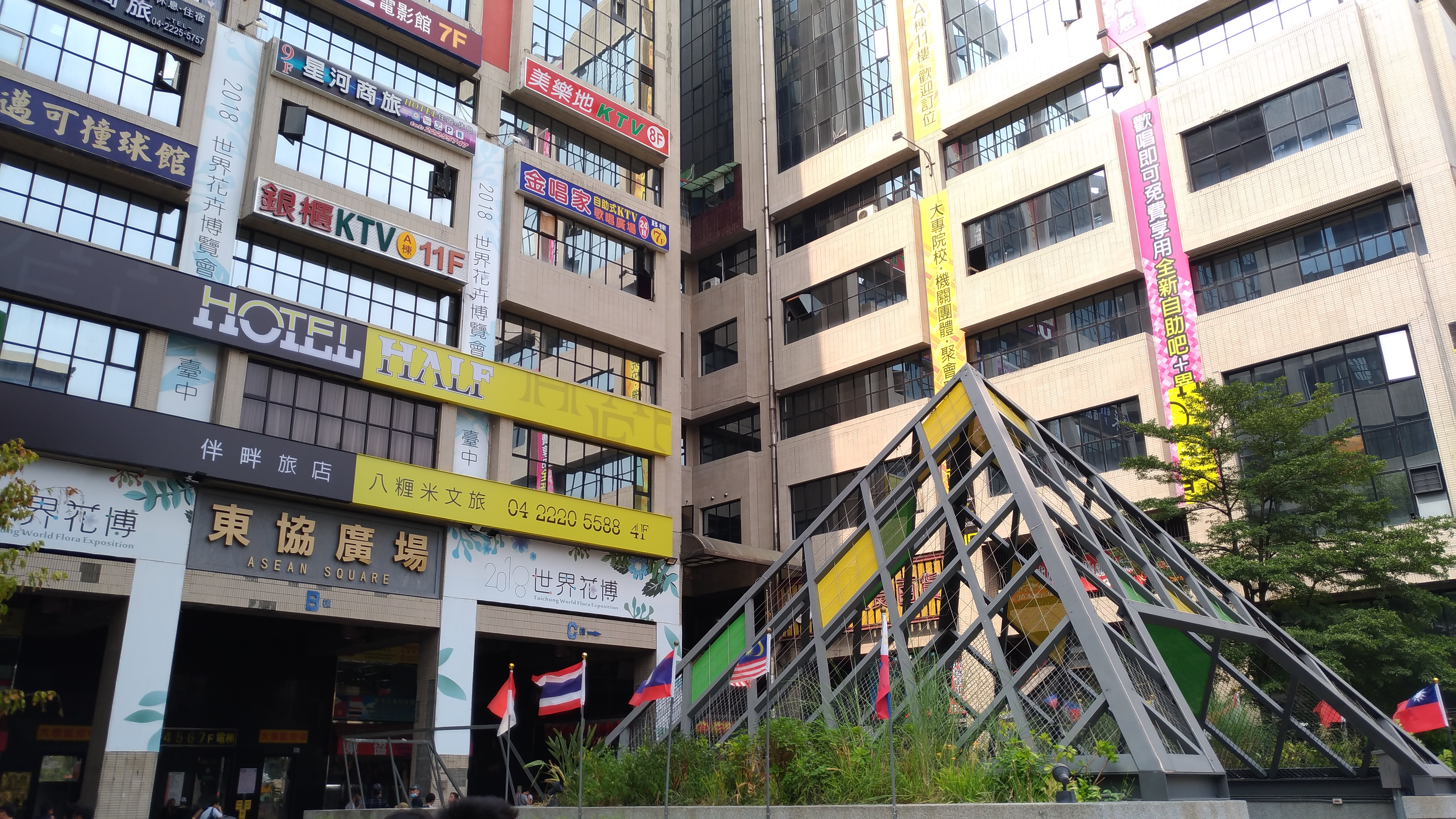
Entrance

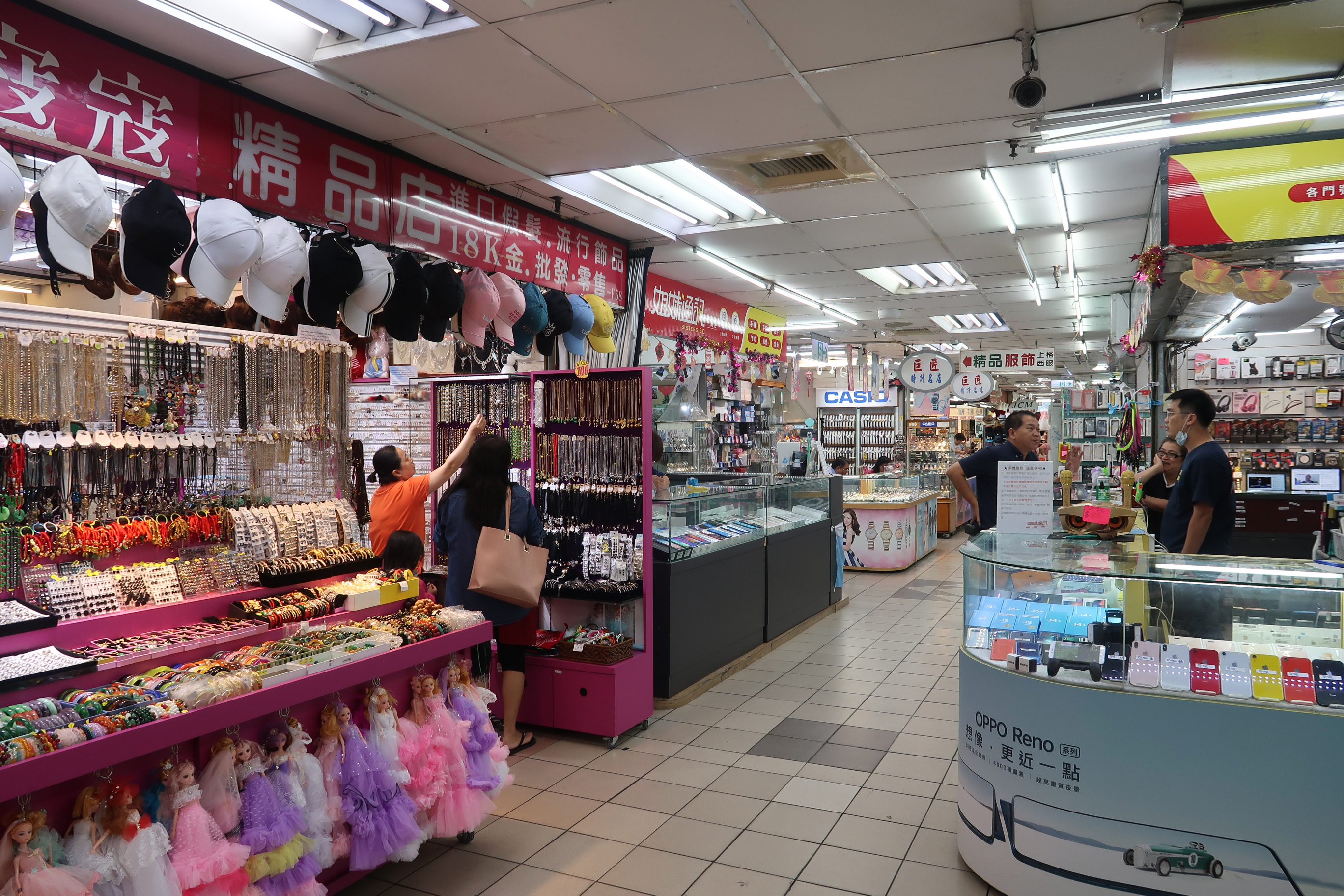
Level 1

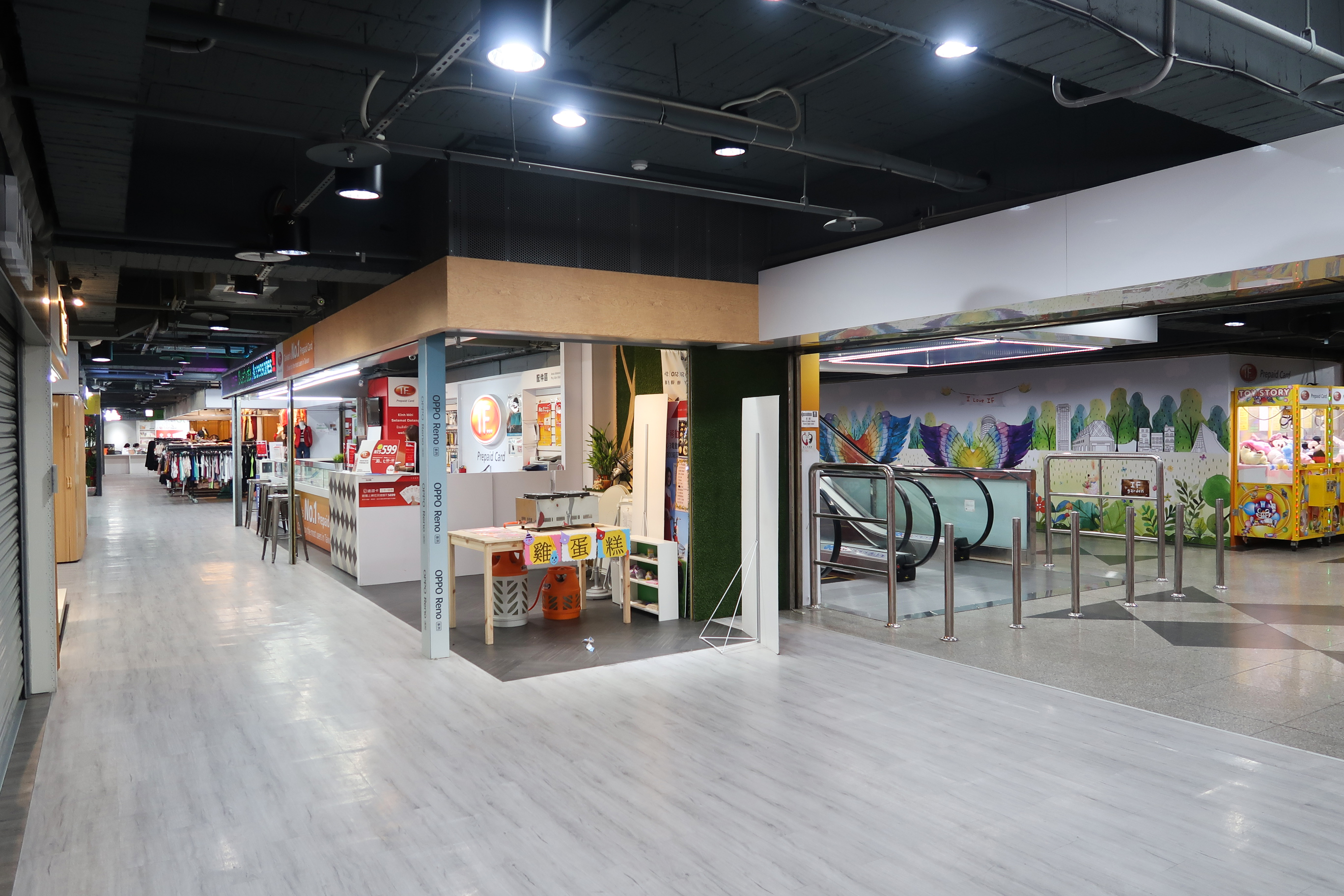
Level 2

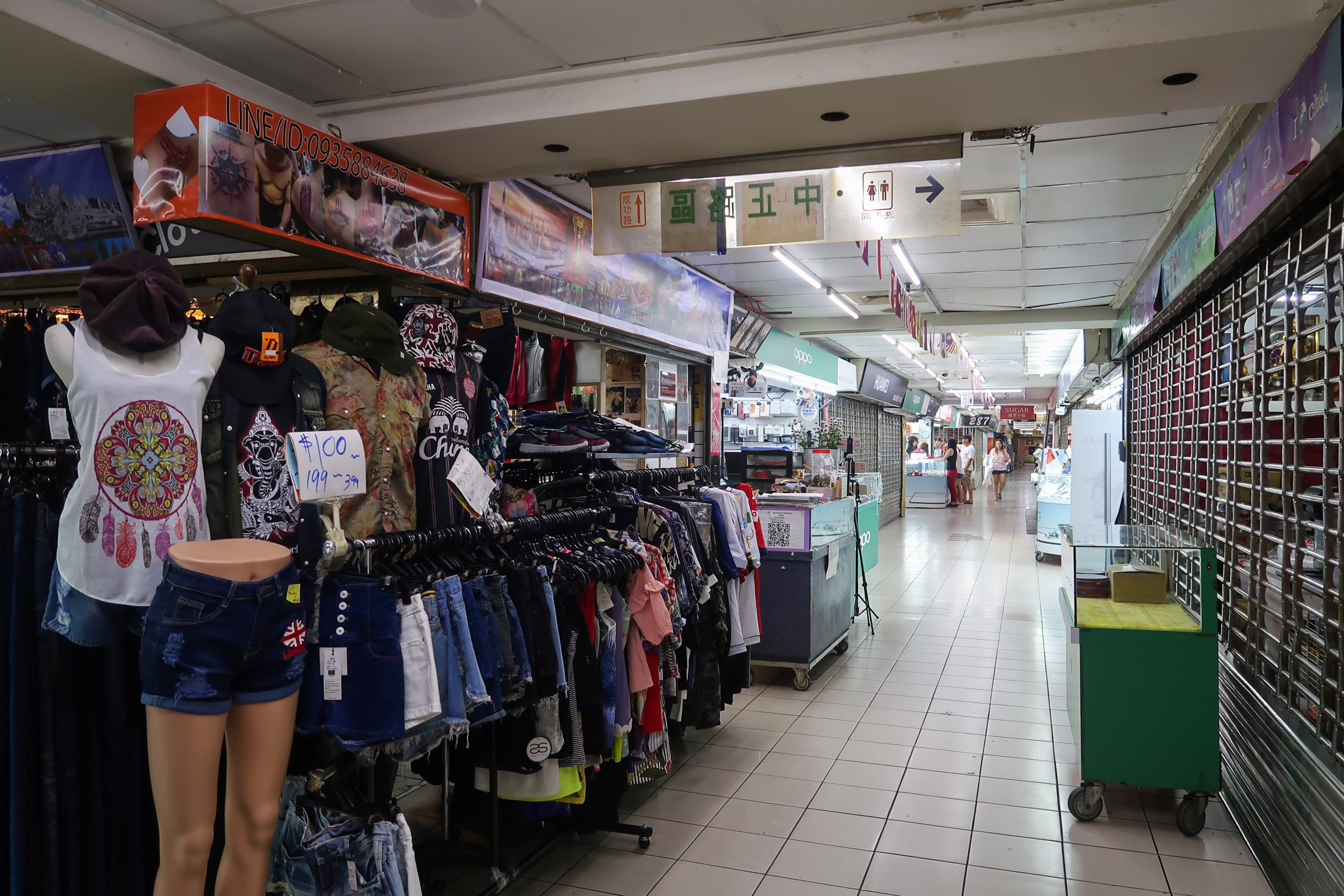
Level 3

== See also ==
- List of tourist attractions in Taiwan
- ASEAN
