= East Coast by Breeze =

- 基隆東岸廣場
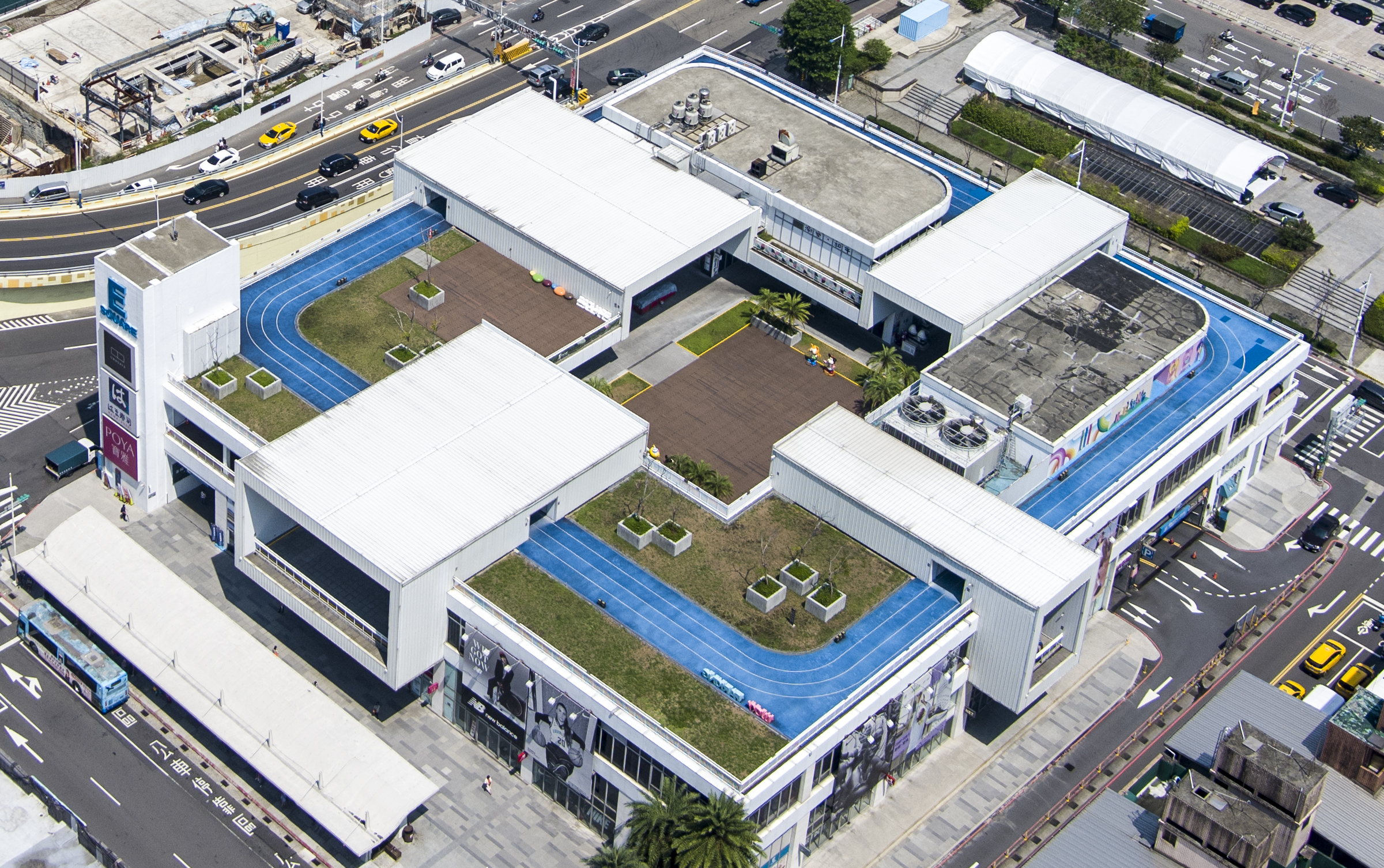
- Keelung E Square aerial photo
- Location: No. 236, Ren 2nd Road, Ren-ai District, Keelung, Taiwan
- Coordinates: 25°7′49″N 121°44′35″E
- Opened: October 2003
- Owner: Keelung City Government
- Floor area: 5,353.7 m^{2} (57,627 sq ft)
- Floors: 4 floors above ground 4 floors below ground

East Coast by Breeze (Chinese: 微風東岸; pinyin: Wéifēng Dōng Àn) is a shopping center in Ren-ai District, Keelung, Taiwan that originally opened in October 2003 with the name Heping Plaza. In November 2016, the building was rebuilt to increase floor area and reopened on February 14, 2018 as Keelung E-Square. With a total floor area of 5,353.7 m^{2} (57,627 sq ft), it is the largest shopping mall in Keelung. On November 11, 2019, the results of the Taiwan Architecture Awards were announced. Keelung E-Square won the first prize out of 177 entries.

== Gallery ==
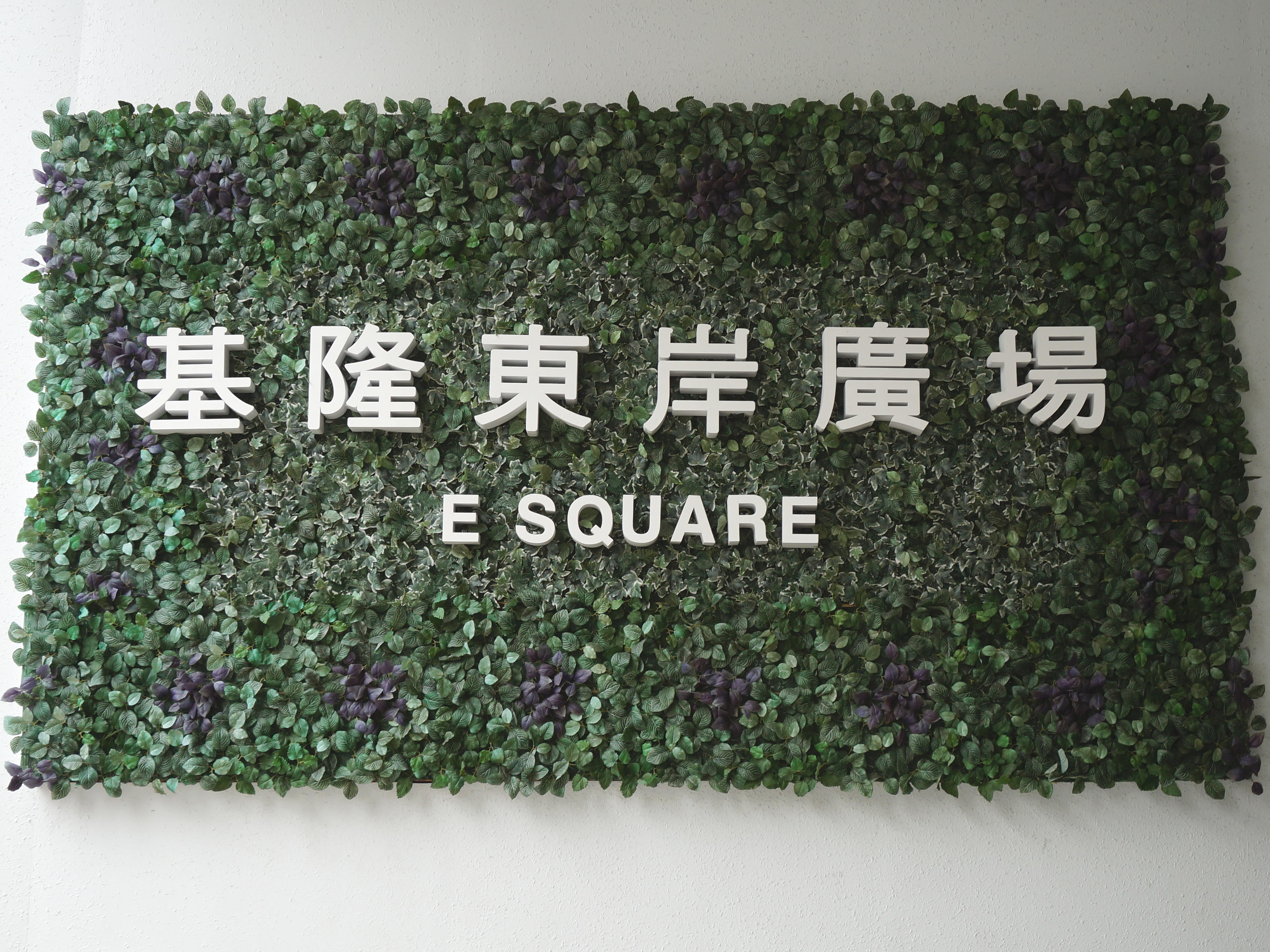
Sign

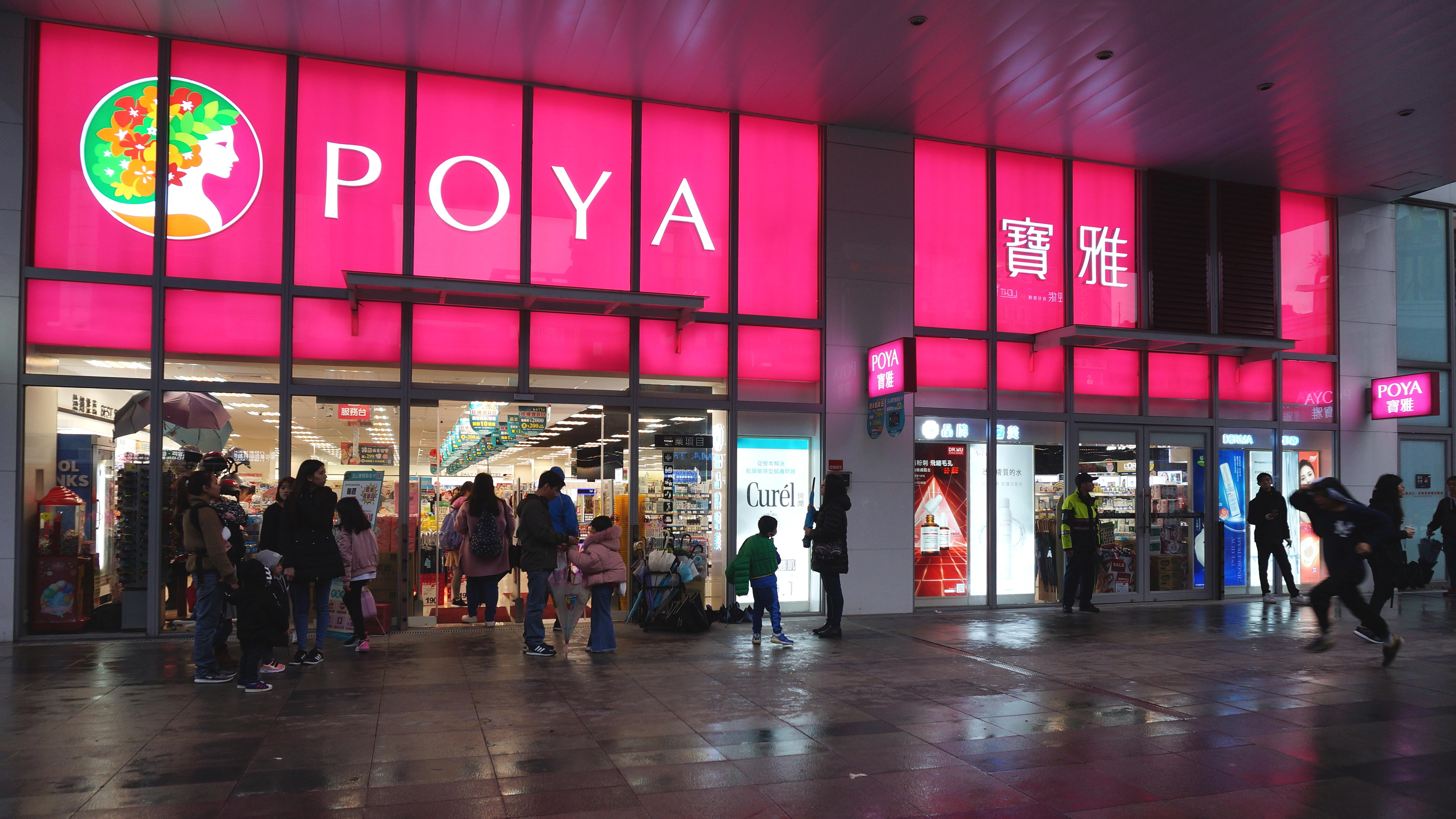
Poya

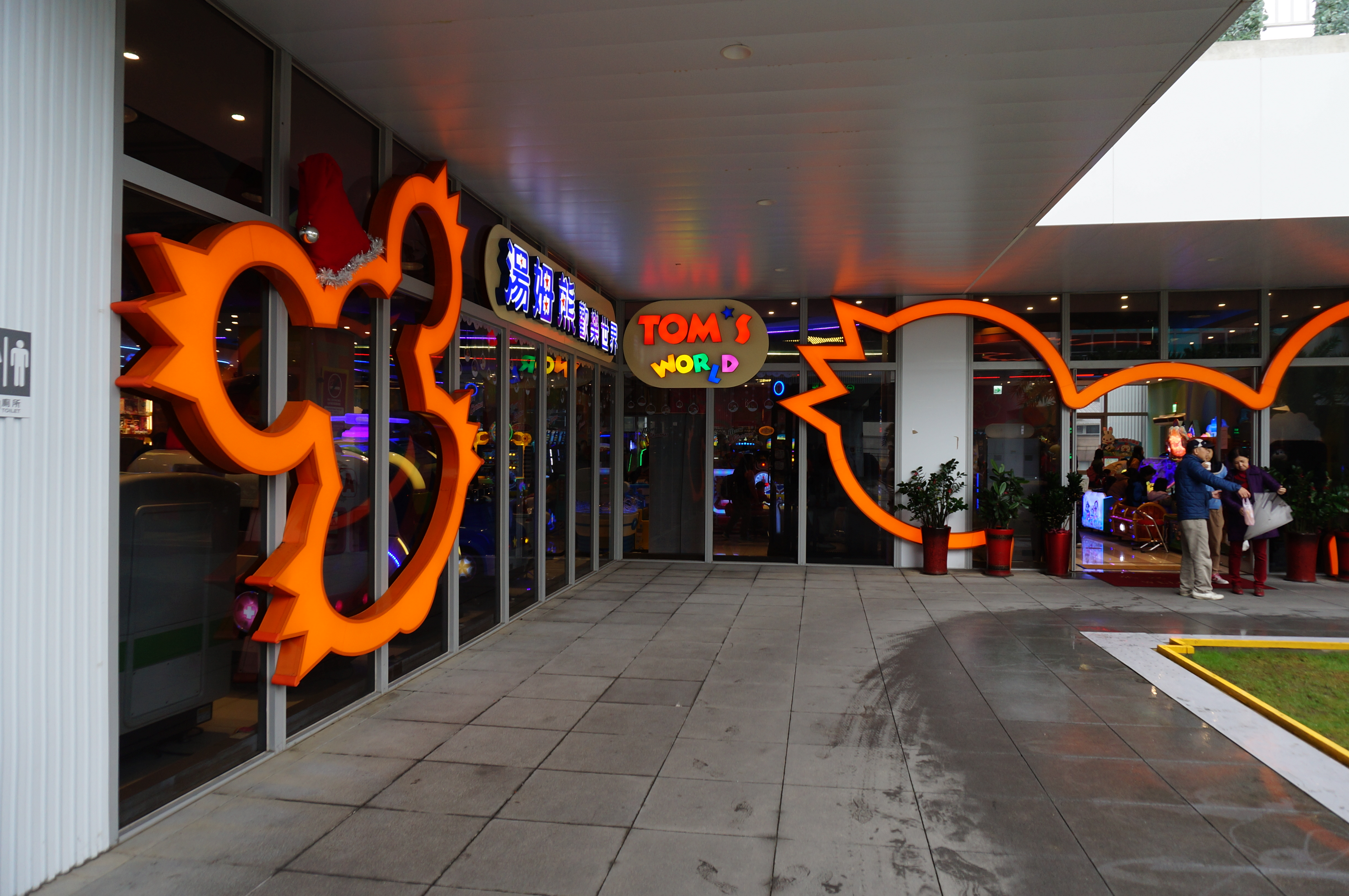
Tom's World

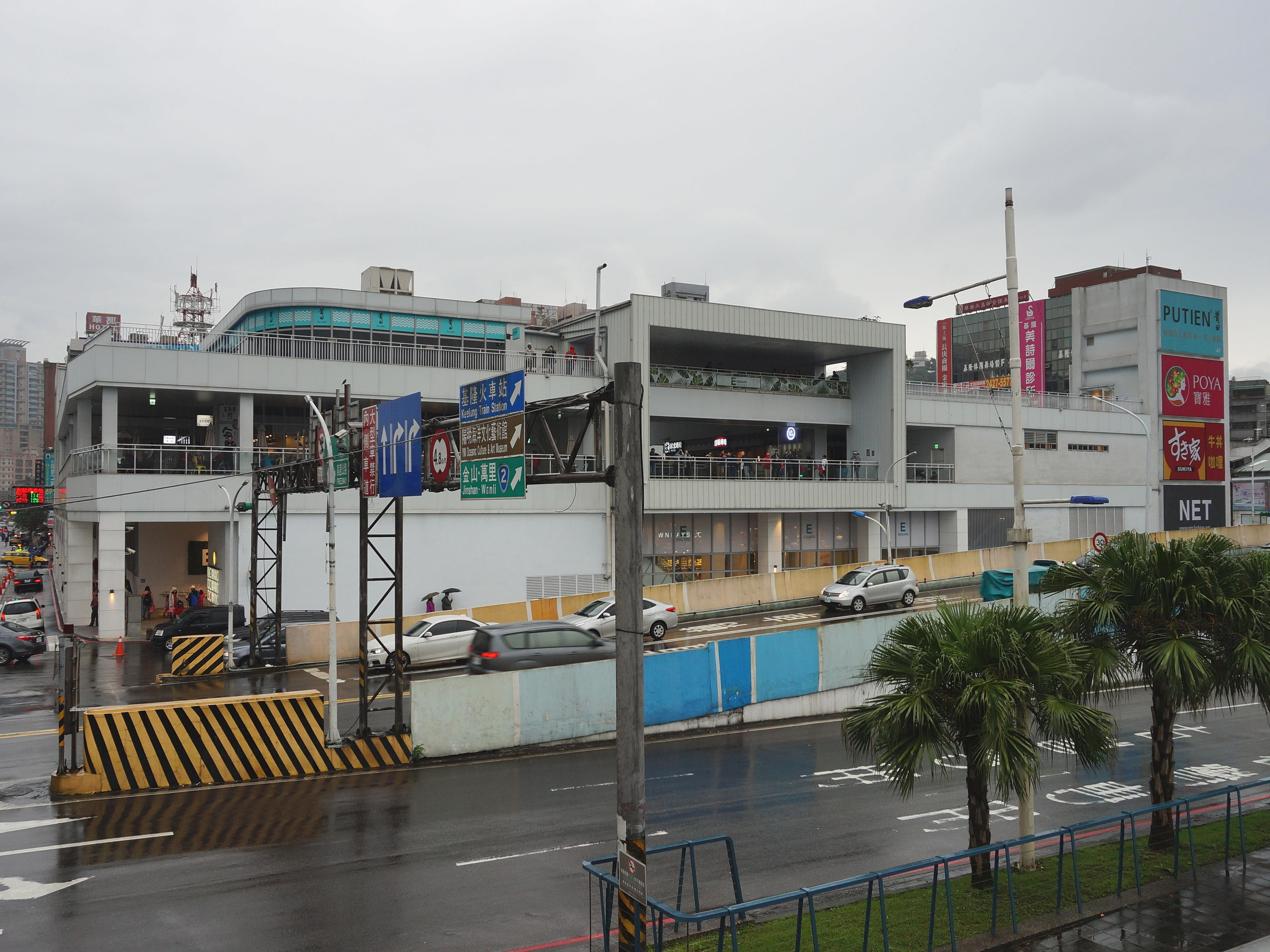
Exterior

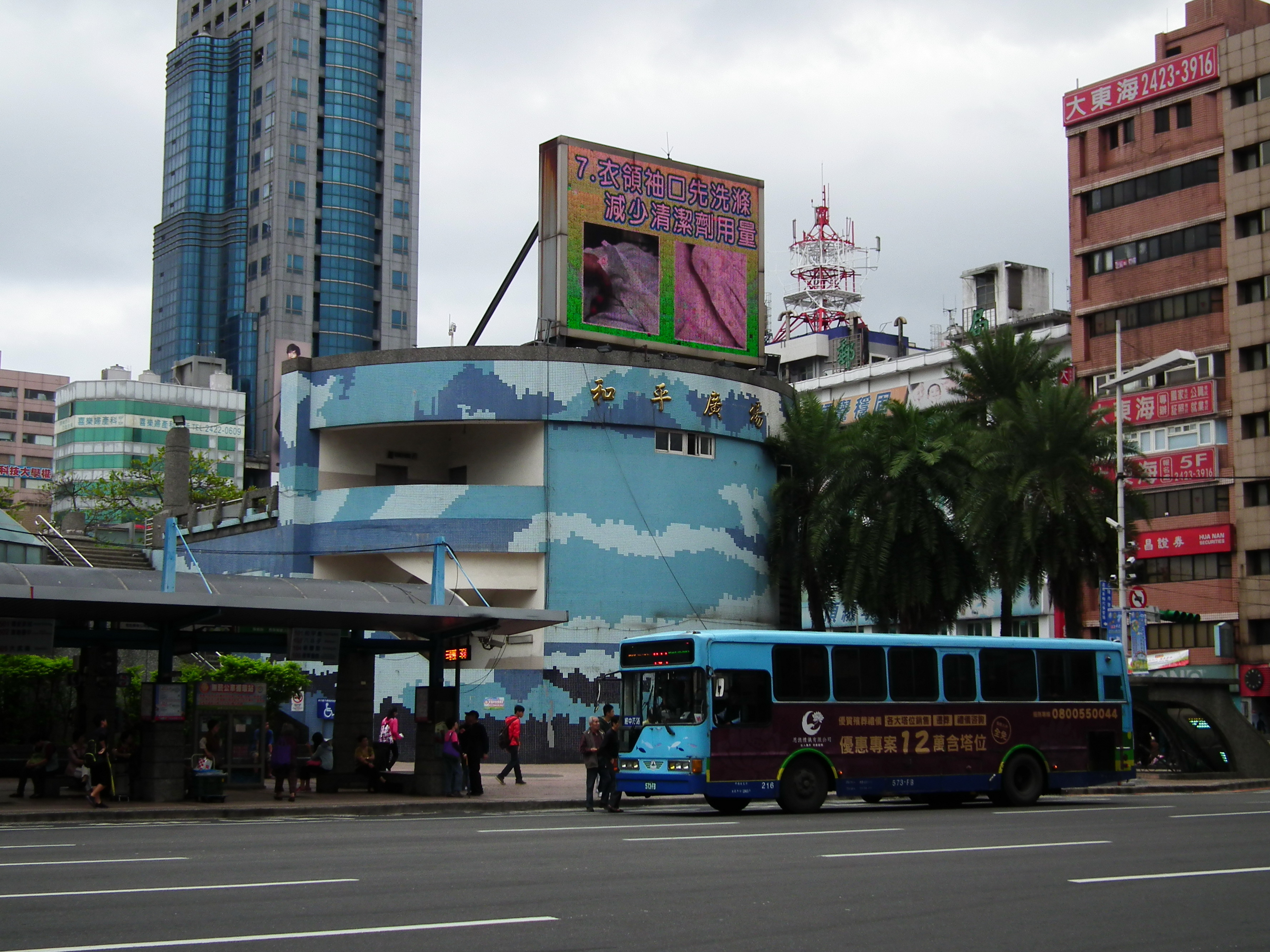
Old view (Heping Plaza)

== See also ==
- List of tourist attractions in Taiwan
