= Sunshine Plaza Outlet =

Shopping mall in Central, Taichung, Taiwan

- 日曜天地OUTLET

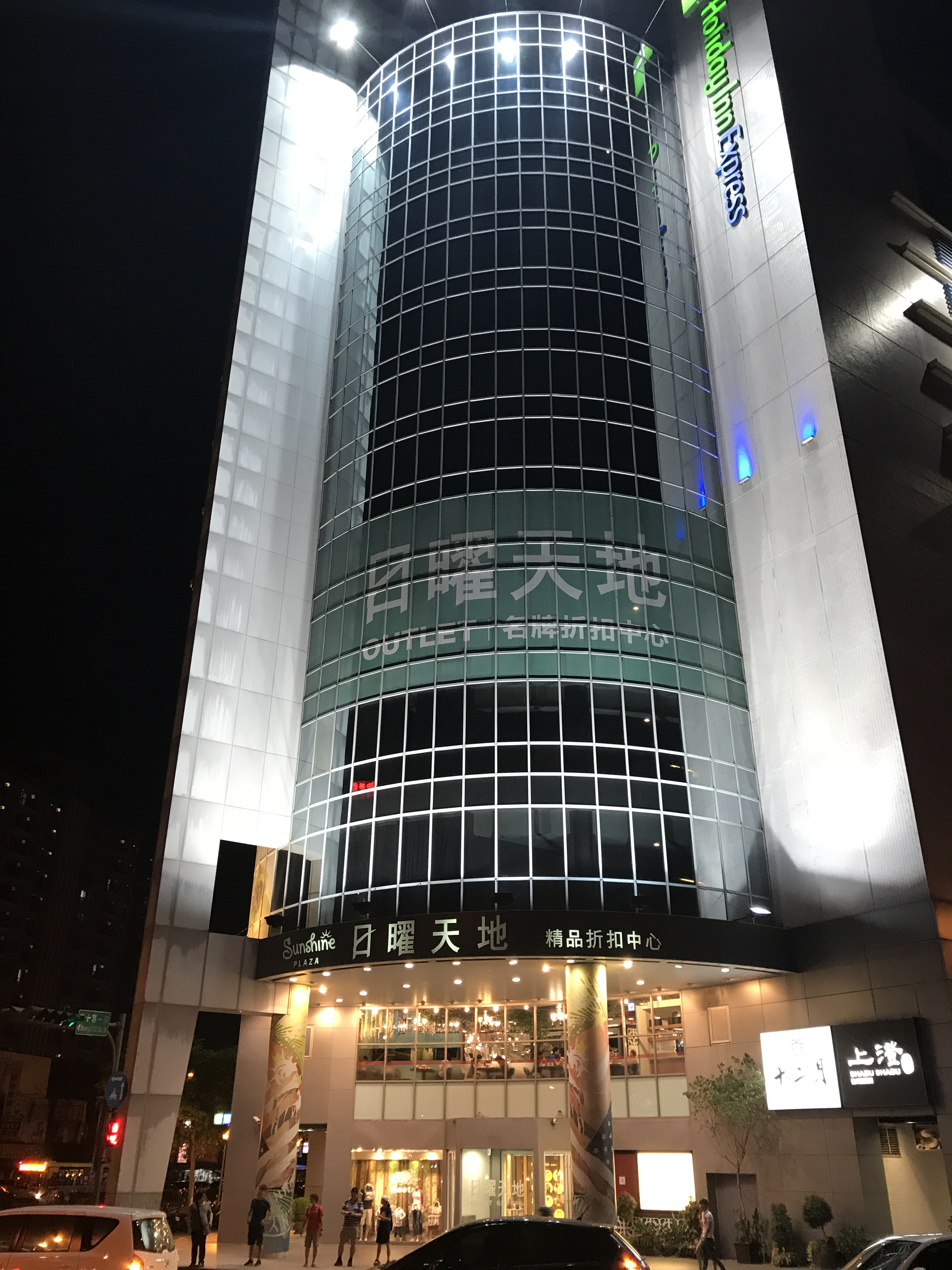
- Location: No. 94, Section 2, Ziyou Road, Central District, Taichung, Taiwan
- Coordinates: 24.142869147718365°N 120.68508433616331°E
- Opened: May 2008
- Num. of stores: 150
- Floor area: 6,600 m^{2} (71,000 sq ft)
- Floors: 2 floors above ground, 2 floors below ground
- Website: www.s-outlet.com.tw

The Sunshine Plaza Outlet (Chinese: 日曜天地OUTLET) is an outlet shopping mall located in Central District, Taichung, Taiwan and officially opened in May 2008. The outlet mall has a floor area of 6,600 m^{2} (71,000 sq ft), which spans 4 floors, and houses about 150 brands, mainly in high-quality bags, imported brands and American leisure, as well as high-quality restaurants such as Italian restaurants.

== Transportation ==
The mall is accessible by walking distance from Taichung railway station.

== See also ==
- List of tourist attractions in Taiwan
- Lihpao Outlet Mall
