= Tech Mall =

Shopping center in Xitun, Taichung, Taiwan

- 中科購物廣場
- Location: No. 8, Lane 370, Yumen Road, Xitun District, Taichung, Taiwan
- Coordinates: 24.1897°N 120.6117°E
- Opened: 14 October 2005
- Closed: 1 June 2020
- Floor area: 15,642 m^{2} (168,370 sq ft)
- Floors: 1 above ground
- Website: www.tech-mall.com.tw

Tech Mall (Chinese: 中科購物廣場) was a shopping center located in Xitun District, Taichung, Taiwan. With a total floor area of 15,642 m^{2} (168,370 sq ft), the mall officially opened on 14 October 2005. On 1 June 2020, the mall was forced to close by the Taichung City Government, which deemed the mall as an illegal construction.

== See also ==
- List of tourist attractions in Taiwan
