= TTFB Company Limited =

Taiwanese restaurant operator

- Industry: Restaurant
- Founded: 8 September 1990 in Taipei, Taiwan
- Founder: Charles Hsu
- Headquarters: 7F-1 176 Jian-yi Rd. Zhonghe, New Taipei, Taiwan
- Areas served: Taiwan and mainland China
- Website: ttfb.com

TTFB Company Limited (TTFB; Chinese: 瓦城泰統集團; pinyin: Wǎchéngtàitǒng Jítuán) is a multi-brand restaurant operator headquartered in New Taipei, Taiwan. The company owns and operates six casual dining restaurant chains: Thai Town Cuisine, Very Thai Restaurant, 1010 Hunan Cuisine, Very Thai Noodles, Ten Ten Hunan Bistro, Shann Rice Bar, YABI KITCHEN and Yue Yue Thai Grill. TTFB was founded on 8 September 1990 by current chairman Charles Hsu and presently employs over 3,000 people across Taiwan and mainland China. TTFB is the largest Asian cuisine chain restaurant operator in Taiwan, with 100 restaurant branches.

== History ==
1990 – The first Thai Town Cuisine opened in Taipei, Taiwan
1995 – The first Very Thai Restaurant opened in Taipei, Taiwan
1996 – The Culinary R&D Center was established
2005 – The internal Asian Cuisine Academy was established
2006 – The first 1010 Hunan Cuisine restaurant opened in Taipei, Taiwan
2009 – TTFB received the 7th Edition Distinguished Service Award in the chain restaurant category from Global Views Monthly magazine (Chinese: 遠見雜誌)
2010 – TTFB received the 8th Edition Distinguished Service Award in the chain restaurant category from Global Views Monthly magazine
2012 – On September 17, TTFB Company Ltd. was officially listed as a public company on the Taipei Exchange (2729 TWO)
2012 – Ministry of Economic Affairs (Taiwan) named Thai Town Cuisine a Superior Commercial Service Brand
2013 – TTFB opened its 60th restaurant location, and expanded into mainland China opening a restaurant at the Reel Mall in Shanghai's Jing'an District
2014 – The company's 4th brand, Very Thai Noodles, opened on May 20 at the Uni-President mall in Taipei, Taiwan
2014 – The company's 5th brand, Ten Ten Hunan Bistro opened in July at the Reel Department Store in Shanghai
2014 – TTFB was listed on Forbes Asia's 200 Best Under a Billion list
2016 – TTFB opened its 100th restaurant location
2017 - The company's 6th brand, Shann Rice Bar, opened on January 25 at the Shinkong Mitsukoshi mall in Taichung, Taiwan
