= Sugar Mall =

Shopping mall in Rende, Tainan, Taiwan

- 台糖嘉年華購物中心
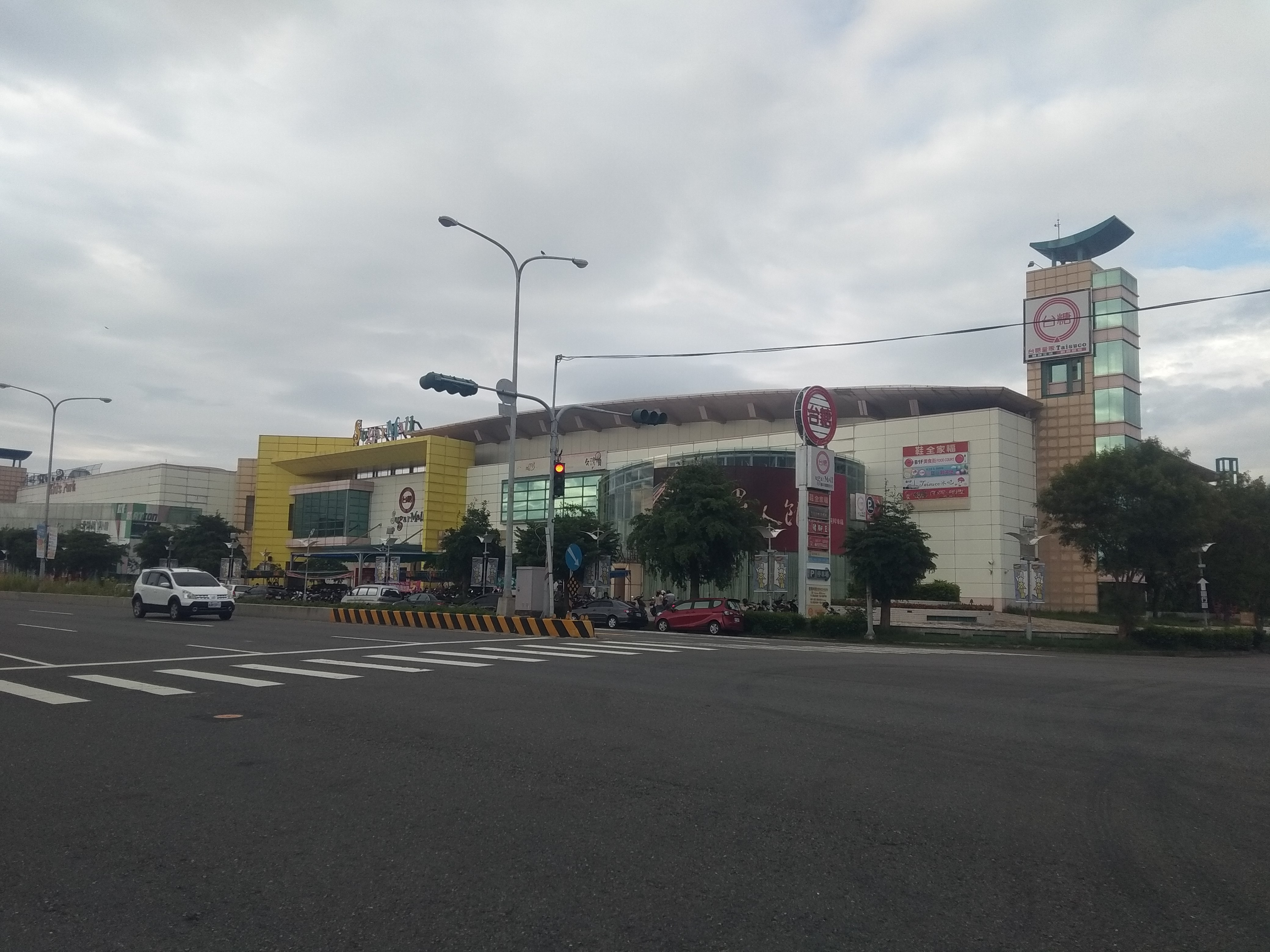
- Location: No. 755, Section 3, Datong Road, Rende District, Tainan, Taiwan
- Coordinates: 22°56′20″N 120°13′15″E
- Opened: 7 October 2003
- Closed: 16 June 2019
- Owner: Taiwan Sugar Corporation
- Floor area: 38,790 m^{2} (417,500 sq ft) (including parking spaces)
- Floors: 2 above ground 1 below ground
- Parking: 919 parking spaces
- Website: www.sugarmall.com.tw

Carrefour Xin Ren Store, the current mall located in original Sugar Mall

Sugar Mall (Chinese: 台糖嘉年華購物中心) is a defunct shopping center located in Rende District, Tainan, Taiwan. With a total floor area of 23,135 m^{2} (249,020 sq ft), the mall officially opened on 7 October 2003. Owned by Taiwan Sugar Corporation, the main core stores of the mall include Carrefour, Showtime Cinemas, Poya, Tom's World and various themed restaurants. On 16 June 2019, the mall ended its operation.

== See also ==
- List of tourist attractions in Taiwan
