= Pescadores Mall =

Shopping mall in Magong, Penghu, Taiwan

- 百世多麗購物中心
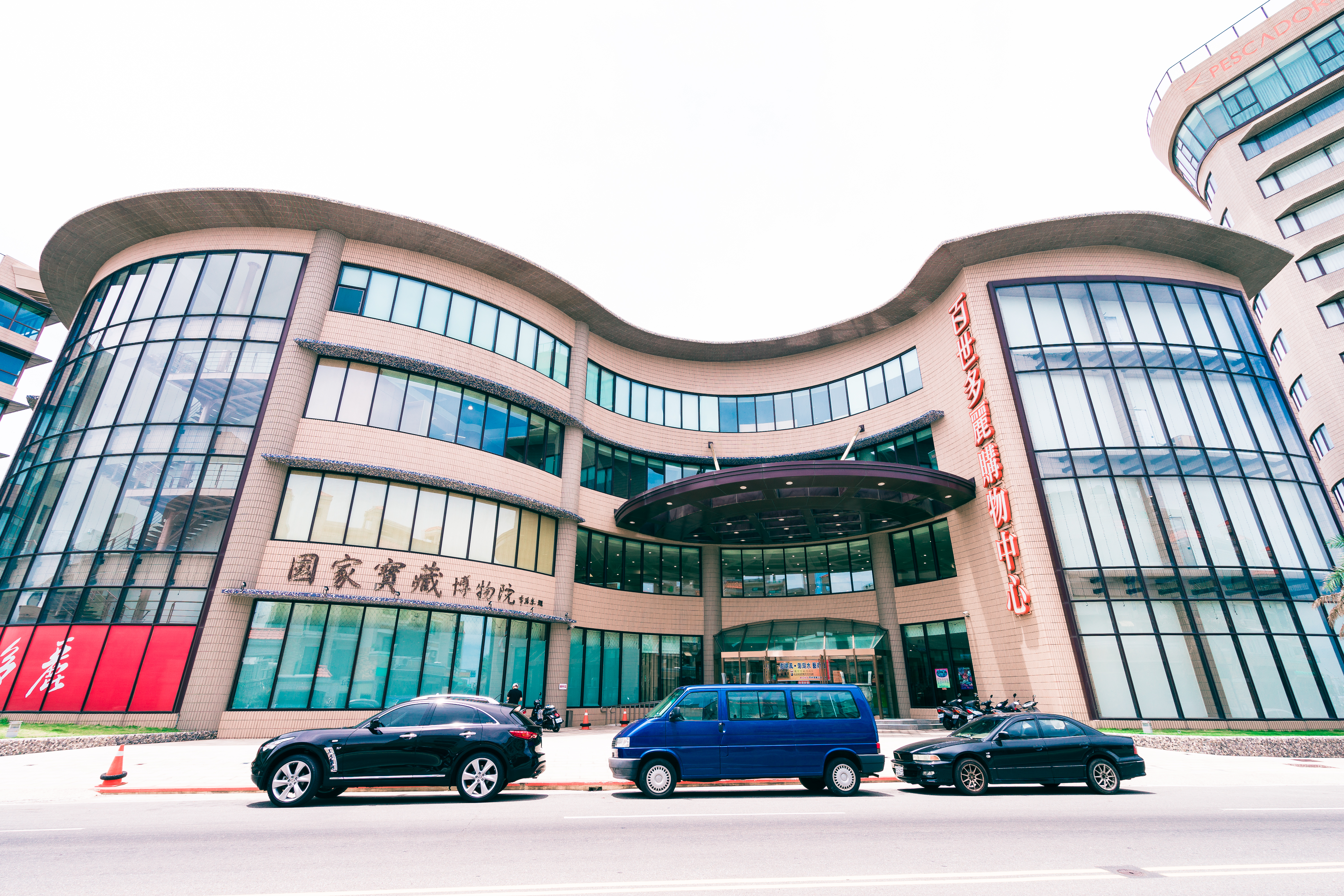
- Location: No. 398, Xindian Road, Magong City, Penghu County, Taiwan
- Coordinates: 23.56931507136394°N 119.58353010098972°E
- Opened: 3 January 2013
- Floor area: 1,800 m^{2} (19,000 sq ft)
- Floors: 3 above ground 1 below ground
- Public transit: Penghu Airport
- Website: http://www.pescadoresresort.com/shopping-mall.php

Pescadores Mall (Chinese: 百世多麗購物中心) is a shopping center in Magong City, Penghu County, Taiwan, that opened on 3 January 2013. With a floor area of approximately 1,800 m^{2} (19,000 sq ft), it is the first shopping mall in the county. The mall is located near Penghu Airport. The mall is a part of a development complex that includes the Pescadores Resort, a duty-free shop and a mall. The main core stores of the mall include PX Mart, international boutiques, perfume and cosmetics and other duty-free shops and brands.

== See also ==
- List of tourist attractions in Taiwan
