= Dadun11 =

Shopping center in Nantun, Taichung, Taiwan

- 大墩食衣生活廣場
- Location: No. 533, Dadun Road, Nantun District, Taichung, Taiwan
- Coordinates: 24.149789221888486°N 120.64967775521212°E
- Opened: 30 April 2016
- Floor area: 42,900 m^{2} (462,000 sq ft) (including parking spaces)
- Floors: 5 floors above ground, 2 floors below ground
- Website: http://www.dadun11.com.tw/

Dadun11 (Chinese: 大墩食衣生活廣場) is a shopping center located in Nantun District, Taichung, Taiwan. The mall started trial operations in January 2016 and officially opened on 30 April 2016. Main core stores of the mall include Carrefour, Hola, and various themed restaurants. Dadun11 started trial operations in January 2016 and officially opened on 30 April 2016.

== See also ==
- List of tourist attractions in Taiwan
