= JMall =

Shopping center in Xitun, Taichung, Taiwan

- JMall食尚廣場
- Location: No. 1038, Section 4, Taiwan Boulevard, Xitun District, Taichung, Taiwan
- Coordinates: 24.183324134529496°N 120.61579398465074°E
- Opened: 2011
- Floors: 2 above ground
- Public transit: Taichung City Hall metro station
- Website: https://j-mall.tw/

JMall (Chinese: JMall食尚廣場) is a shopping center located in Xitun District, Taichung, Taiwan that opened in 2011. In 2017, the mall closed for renovation and reopened on 15 June 2018 as a dining hub featuring a wide variety of eateries from fast food joints to other upscale venues. Main core stores in the mall include Tim Ho Wan, Formosa Chang, Yi Fang Tea and various themed restaurants.

== Incidents ==
The Taichung Fire Department received a report at 2:44 pm on 16 August 2020 that a substation fire accident was reported at JMall. A power substation outside the building behind the mall was short-circuited with popping sound and fire. The fire station dispatched 5 fire trucks, 1 ambulance, and 15 firefighters.

== See also ==
- List of tourist attractions in Taiwan
