= J.Piin =

Shopping mall in East, Hsinchu City, Taiwan

- 晶品城購物廣場

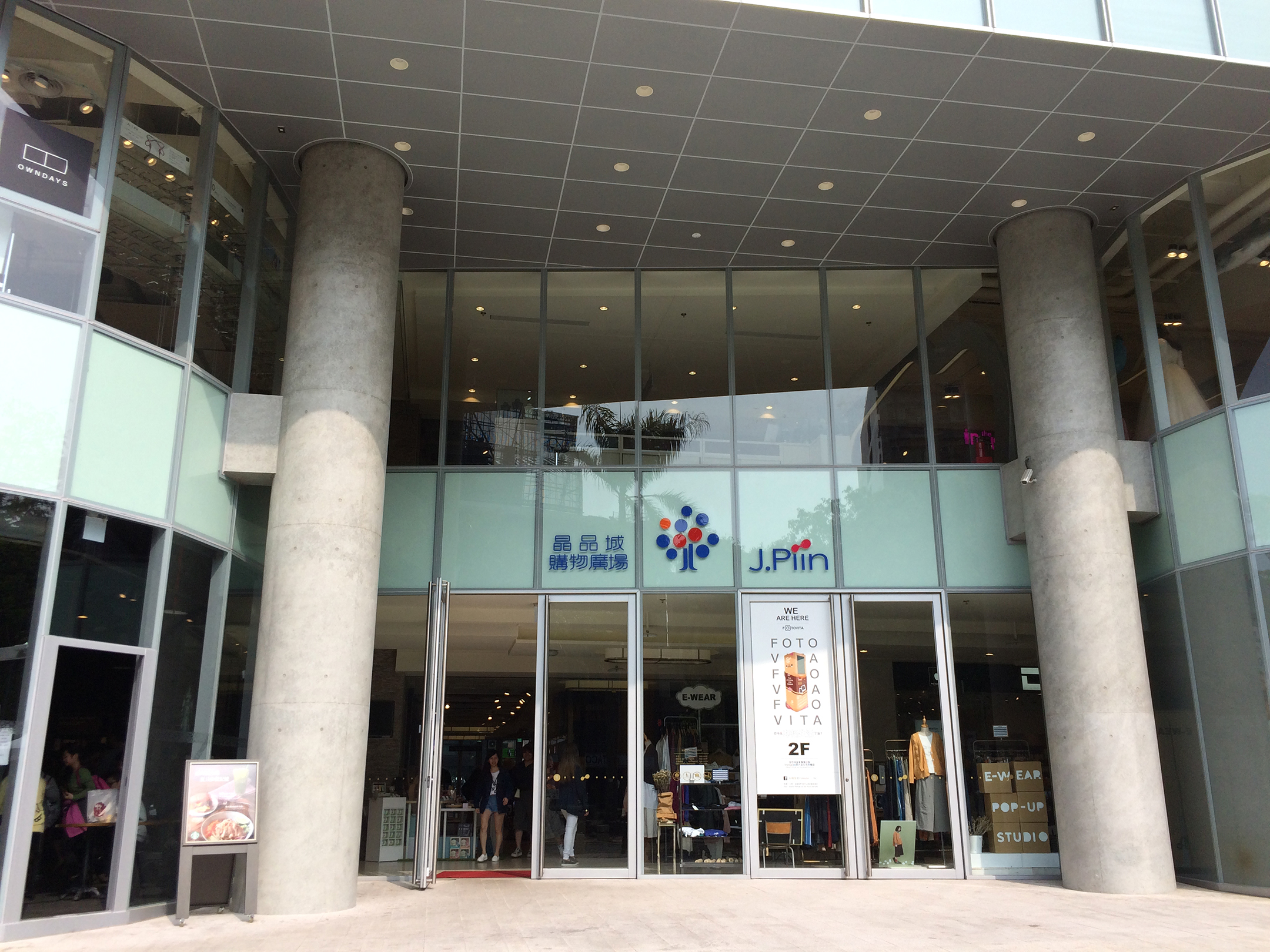
- Location: No. 18, Linsen Road, East District, Hsinchu City, Taiwan
- Coordinates: 24°48′10″N 120°58′14″E
- Opened: October 29, 2016
- Floor area: 33,000 m^{2} (360,000 sq ft) (including parking spaces)
- Floors: 13 floors above ground 4 below ground
- Public transit: Hsinchu railway station
- Website: https://jpiin.com/

J.Piin (Chinese: 晶品城購物廣場) is a shopping mall located in the East District of Hsinchu City, Taiwan, which opened on October 29, 2016. With a total floor area of 14,520 m^{2} (156,300 sq ft) and 13 floors above ground, the mall is located in close proximity to Hsinchu railway station. The 1st to 3rd floors house stores offering international sports brands, electronic products, and local cultural and creative industries. The food courts are on the 12th and 13th floors. The public square of the shopping mall showcases some of the public artworks created by the Taiwanese artist Jimmy Liao.

== Gallery ==
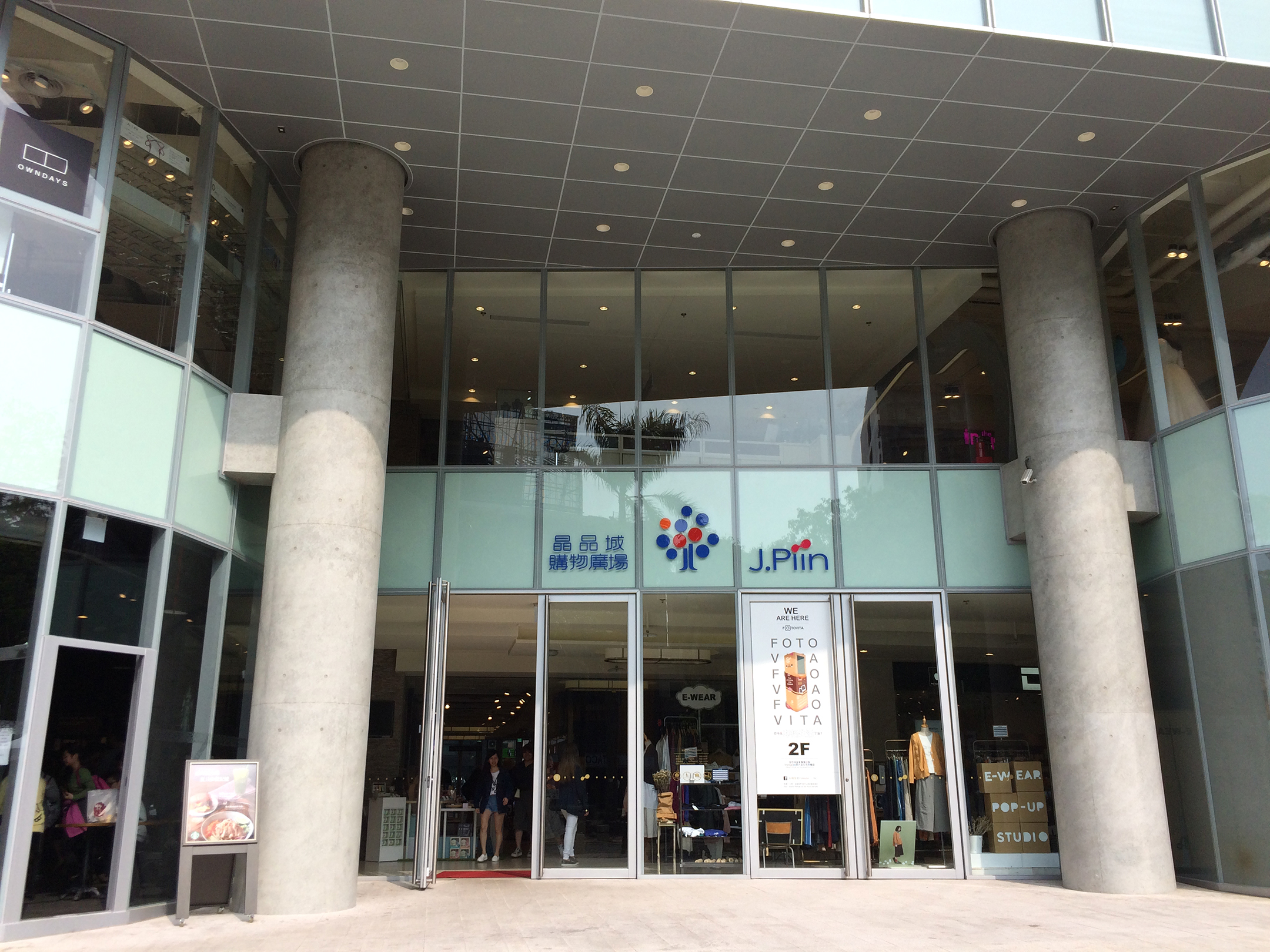
Exterior

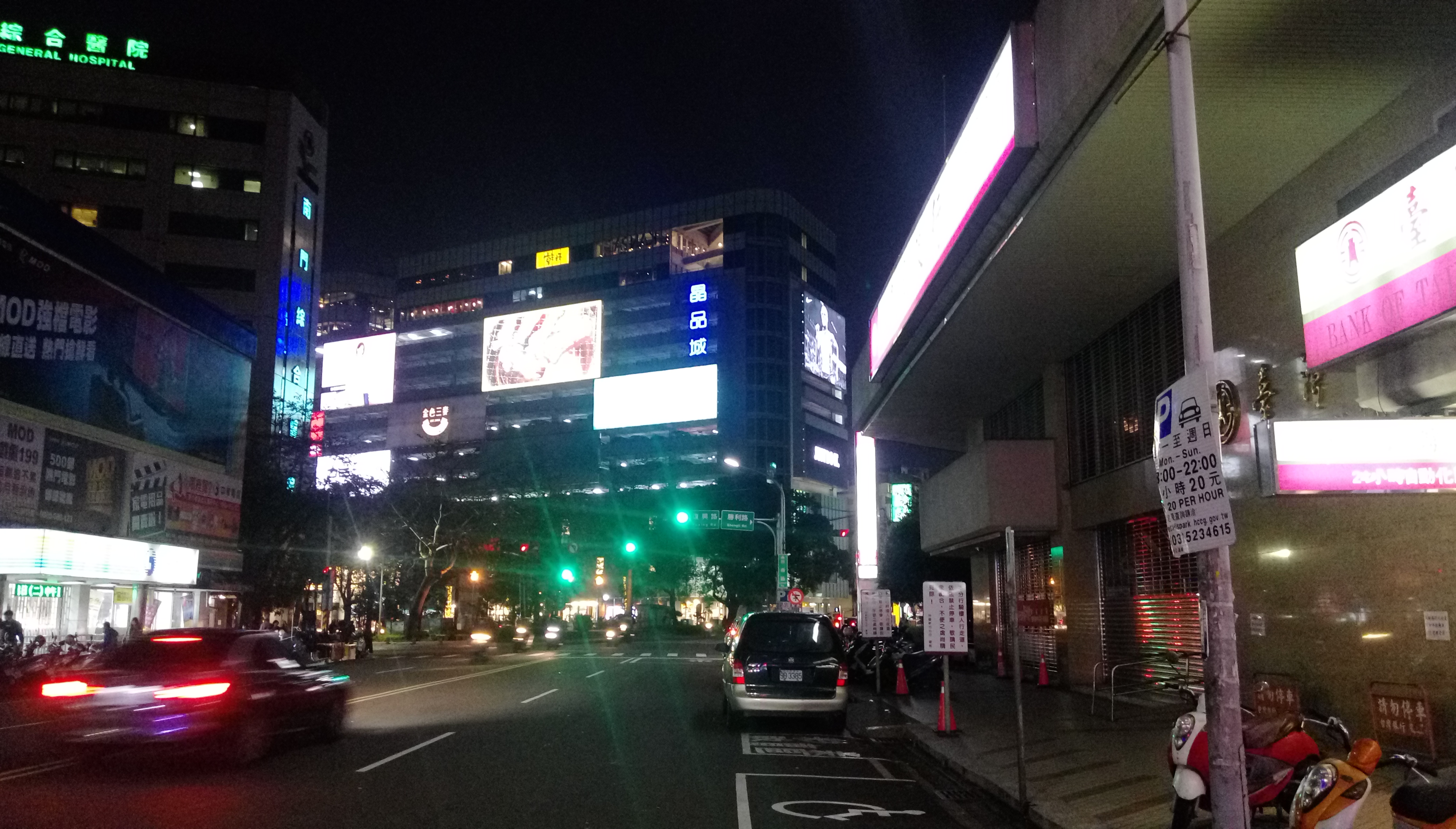
At night

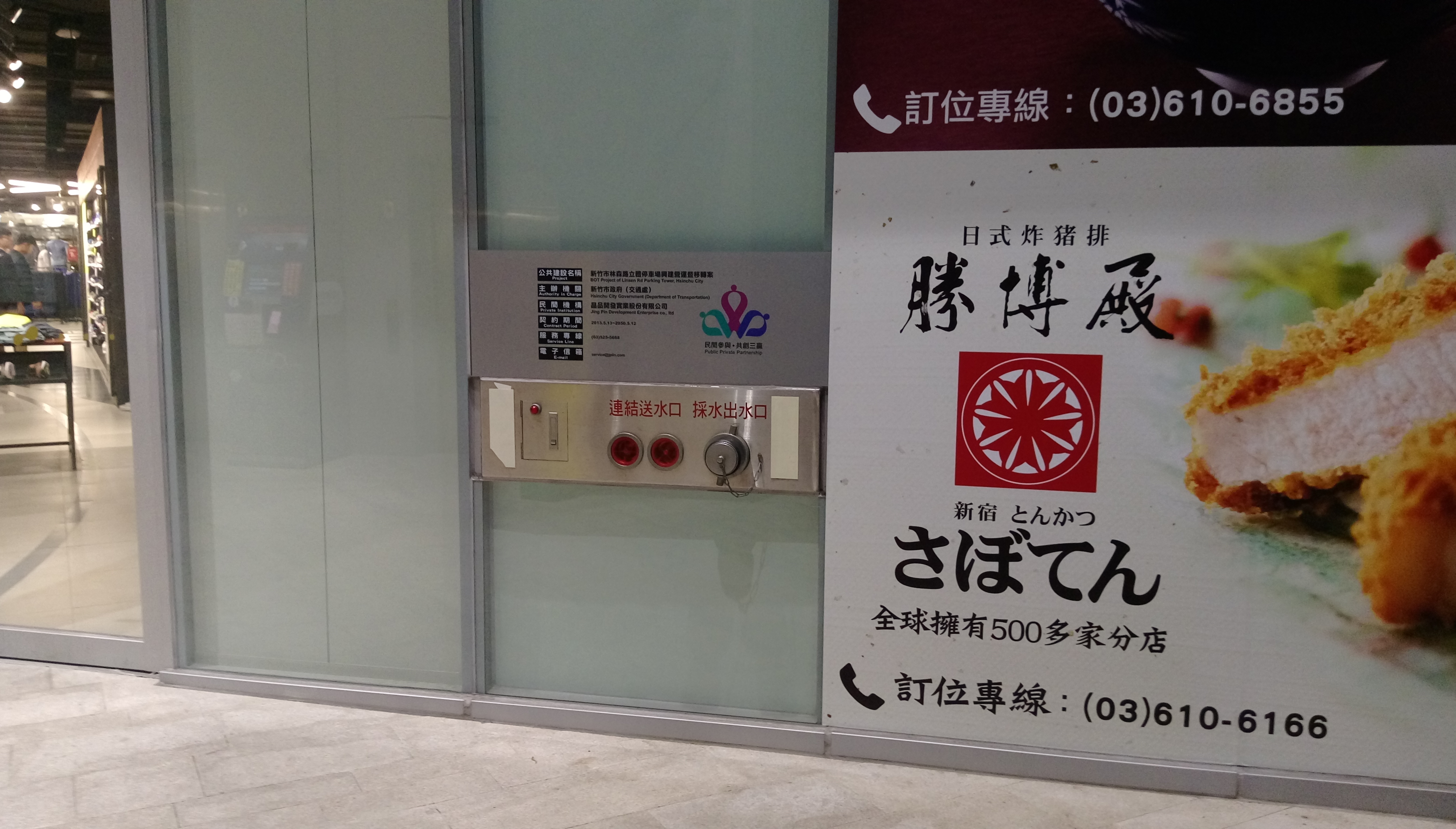
Interior

== See also ==
- List of tourist attractions in Taiwan
