= Treasure Island Shopping Center =

Shopping mall in Qianzhen, Kaohsiung, Taiwan

- 金銀島購物中心
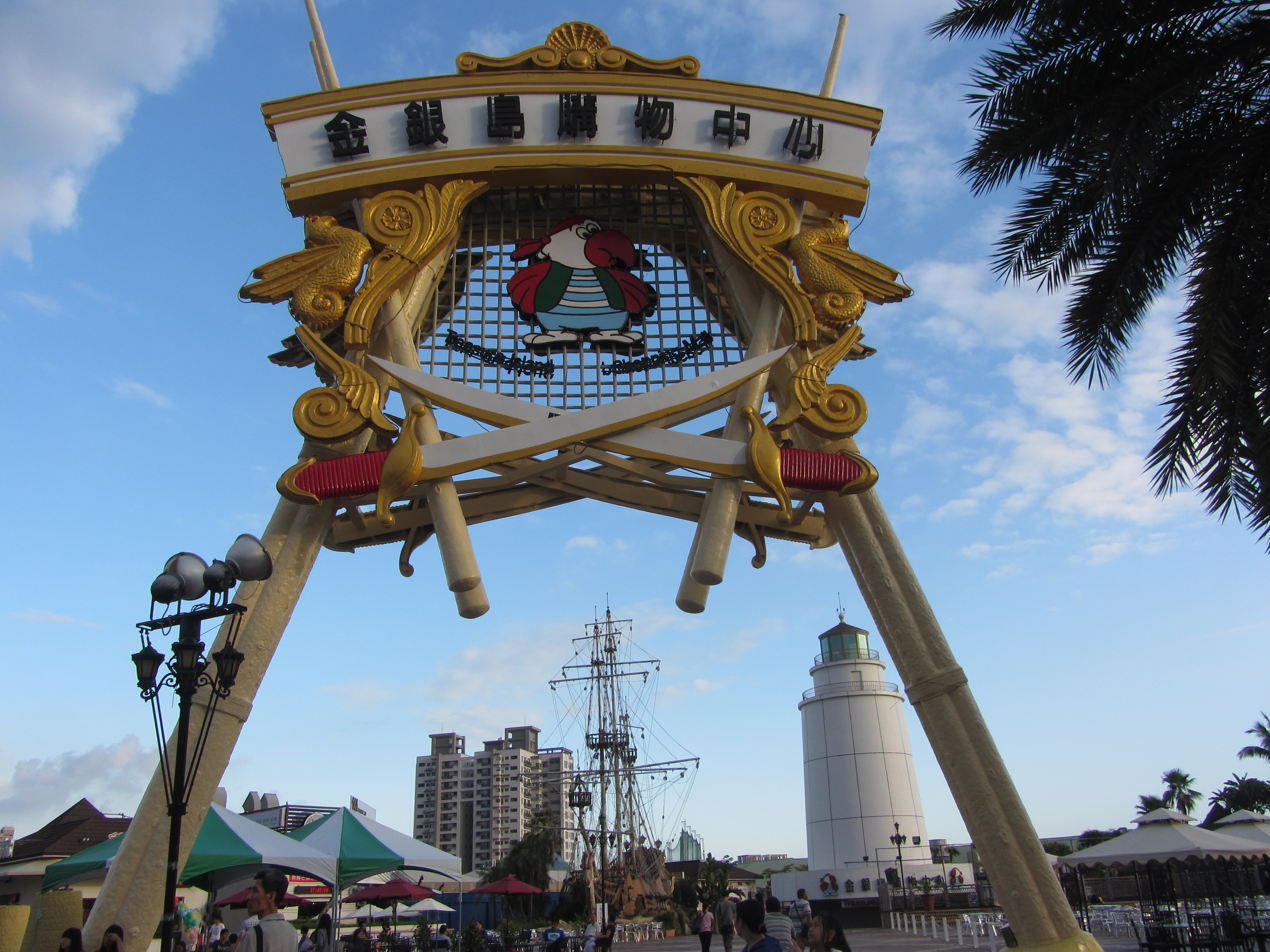
- Location: No. 688, Kaisyuan 4th Road, Cianjhen District, Kaohsiung, Taiwan
- Coordinates: 22.5985°N 120.3196°E
- Opened: 10 April 1999
- Closed: 31 March 2015
- Floor area: 34,762 m^{2} (374,180 sq ft)
- Floors: 1 above ground 1 below ground
- Public transit: Kaisyuan metro station

Treasure Island Shopping Center (Chinese: 金銀島購物中心) is a defunct shopping center located in Cianjhen District, Kaohsiung, Taiwan. With a total floor area of 34,762 m^{2} (374,180 sq ft), the mall started trial operations on 27 March 1999 and officially opened on 10 April 1999. On 31 March 2015, the mall ended operation.

== Design and facilities ==
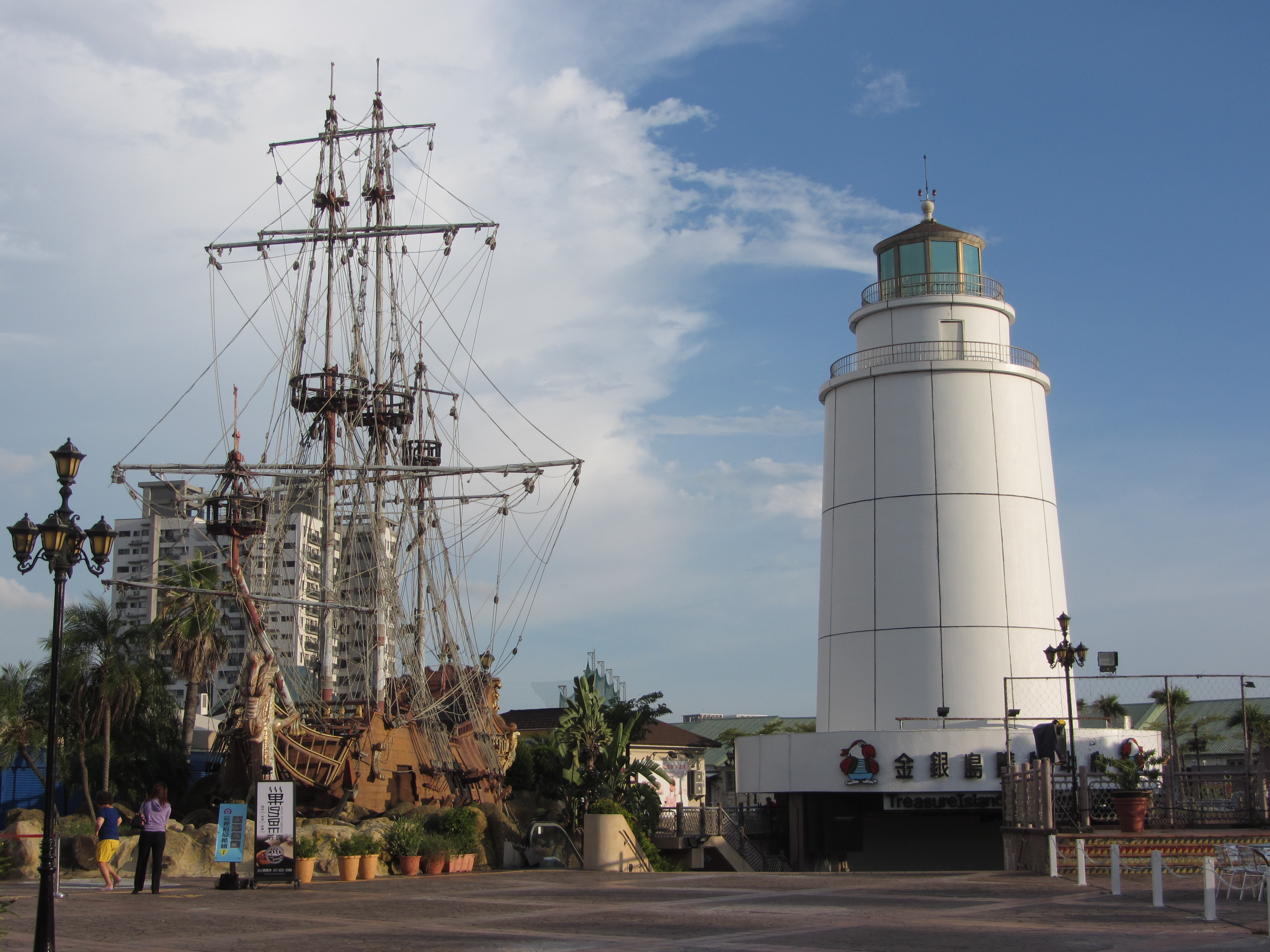
Pirate Ship and Light House

Since Treasure Island Shopping Center is located around the Port of Kaohsiung, the mall takes the ships sailing the sea as the overall design image: empty ground squares, parking lots are like the endless sea, and the sea is dotted with giant lighthouses and pirate ships. The entire mall can also be regarded as a giant ship. The ground floor is a vast ship deck. Through the central sunken starlight stage and the multiple entrances and exits around it, the ground floor deck and the business space of the basement cabin are connected.

In the early days of its opening, artist autograph meetings were held and there were occasional performances in the Starlight Stage on the basement floor. Large-scale book fairs, wedding fairs, and furniture fairs will be held from time to time in the exhibition space surrounding the stage in the mall. In the later stage of operation, a small open-air coffee shop was added to the square on the ground floor to provide a leisure function for watching the night view of the harbor.

== See also ==
- List of tourist attractions in Taiwan
- Treasure Island Next Mall
