= Global Mall Pingtung =

Shopping mall in Pingtung City, Pingtung County, Taiwan

- 環球購物中心屏東市

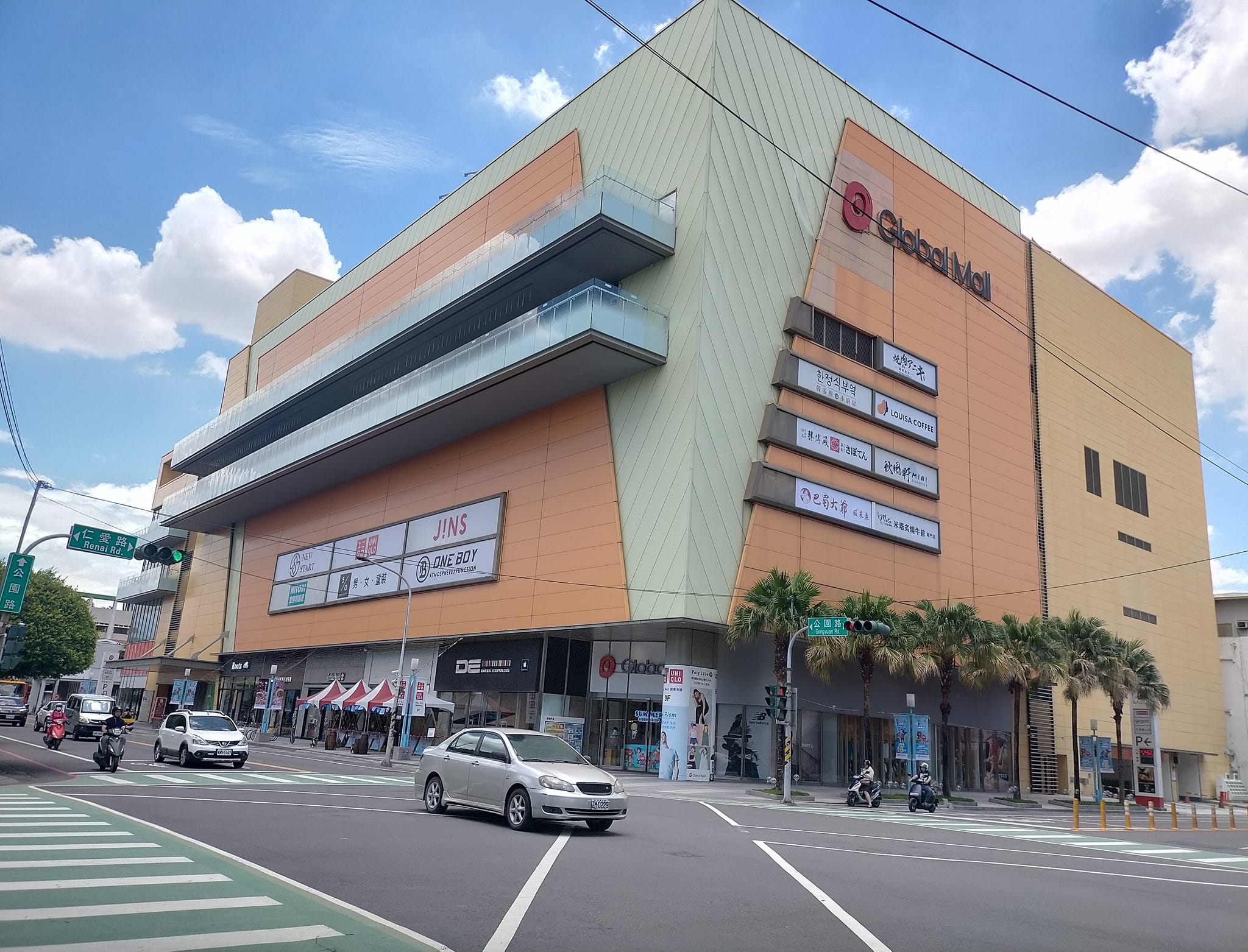
- Location: No. 90, Ren'ai Road, Pingtung City, Pingtung County, Taiwan
- Coordinates: 22.6734153304074°N 120.49323018613585°E
- Opened: December 15, 2012
- Floor area: 23,100 m^{2} (249,000 sq ft)
- Floors: 7 floors above ground 3 floor below ground
- Website: https://www.twglobalmall.com/

Global Mall Pingtung (Chinese: 環球購物中心屏東市) is a shopping mall in Pingtung City, Pingtung County, Taiwan that opened on December 15, 2012. With a total floor area of 23,100 m^{2} (249,000 sq ft), the mall is located in close proximity to National Pingtung Girls' Senior High School and Pingtung Park.

== History ==
- A groundbreaking ceremony was held on July 29, 2011
- On December 15, 2012, Global Mall Pingtung was opened, becoming the third branch of Global Mall and the first outside New Taipei City.
- In September 2020, the mall was renovated to include an outlet section.

== See also ==
- List of tourist attractions in Taiwan
- Global Mall Taoyuan A8
- Global Mall Xinzuoying Station
