= Global Mall Xinzuoying Station =

Shopping mall in Zuoying, Kaohsiung, Taiwan

- 環球購物中心新左營車站

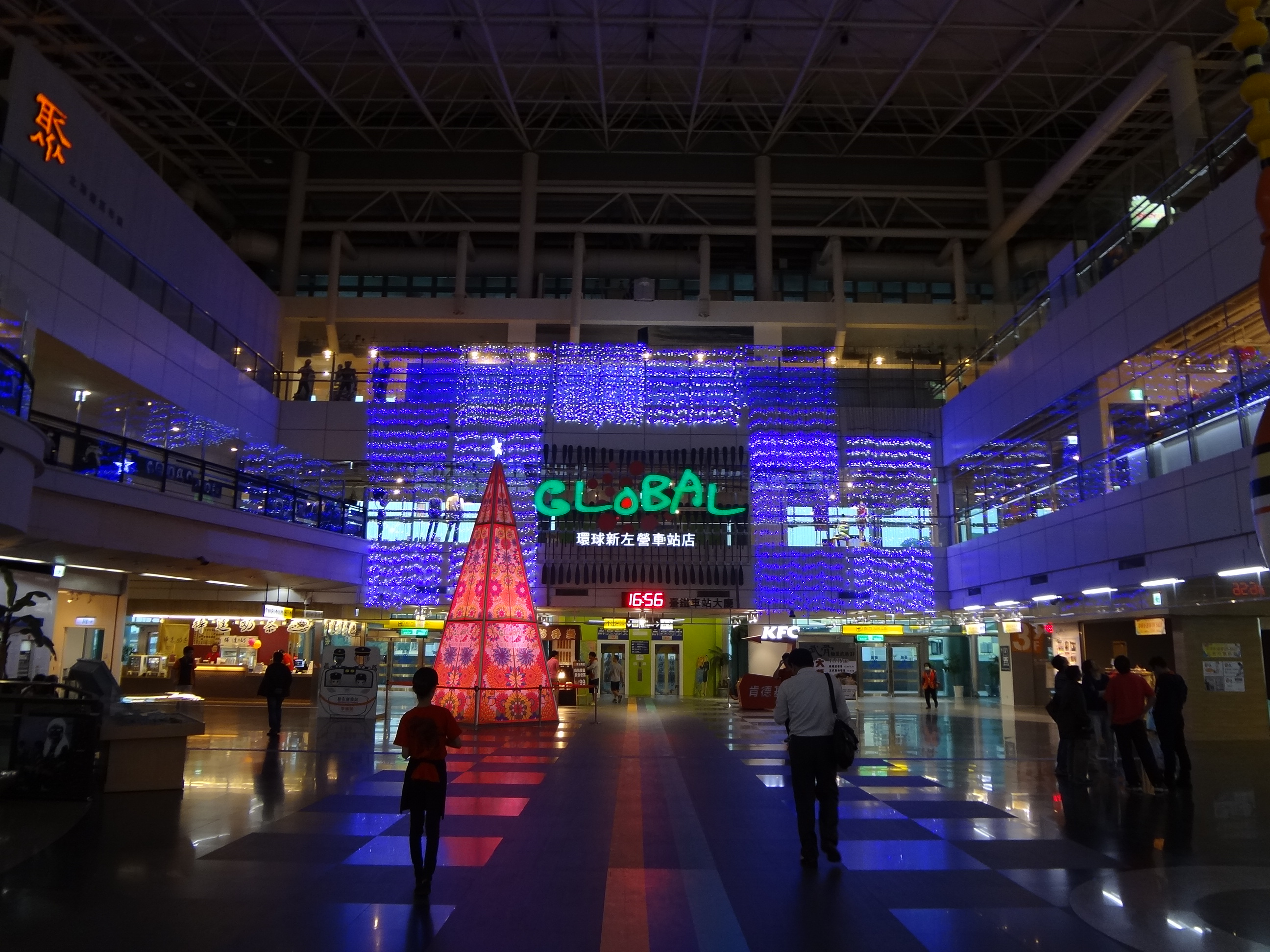
- Location: No. 1, Zhanqian North Road, Zuoying District, Kaohsiung, Taiwan
- Coordinates: 22.68755815313544°N 120.30735189751275°E
- Opened: April 2013
- Floor area: 8,700 m^{2} (94,000 sq ft)
- Floors: 2 floors above ground 3 floor below ground
- Website: https://www.twglobalmall.com/

Global Mall Xinzuoying Station (Chinese: 環球購物中心新左營車站) is a shopping mall in Zuoying District, Kaohsiung, Taiwan that opened in April 2013. With a total floor area of 8,700 m^{2} (94,000 sq ft), the mall is located inside Zuoying HSR station.

== History ==
- On February 29, 2012, Global Mall Xinzuoying Station held a groundbreaking ceremony.
- In April 2013, Global Mall Xinzuoying Station opened, it is the fifth store of Global Mall.
- In September 2020, the mall was renovated to include an outlet section.

== See also ==
- List of tourist attractions in Taiwan
- Global Mall Taoyuan A8
- Global Mall Pingtung
