= List of department stores of Taiwan =

This is a list of current and defunct department stores in Taiwan.

== Current department stores ==
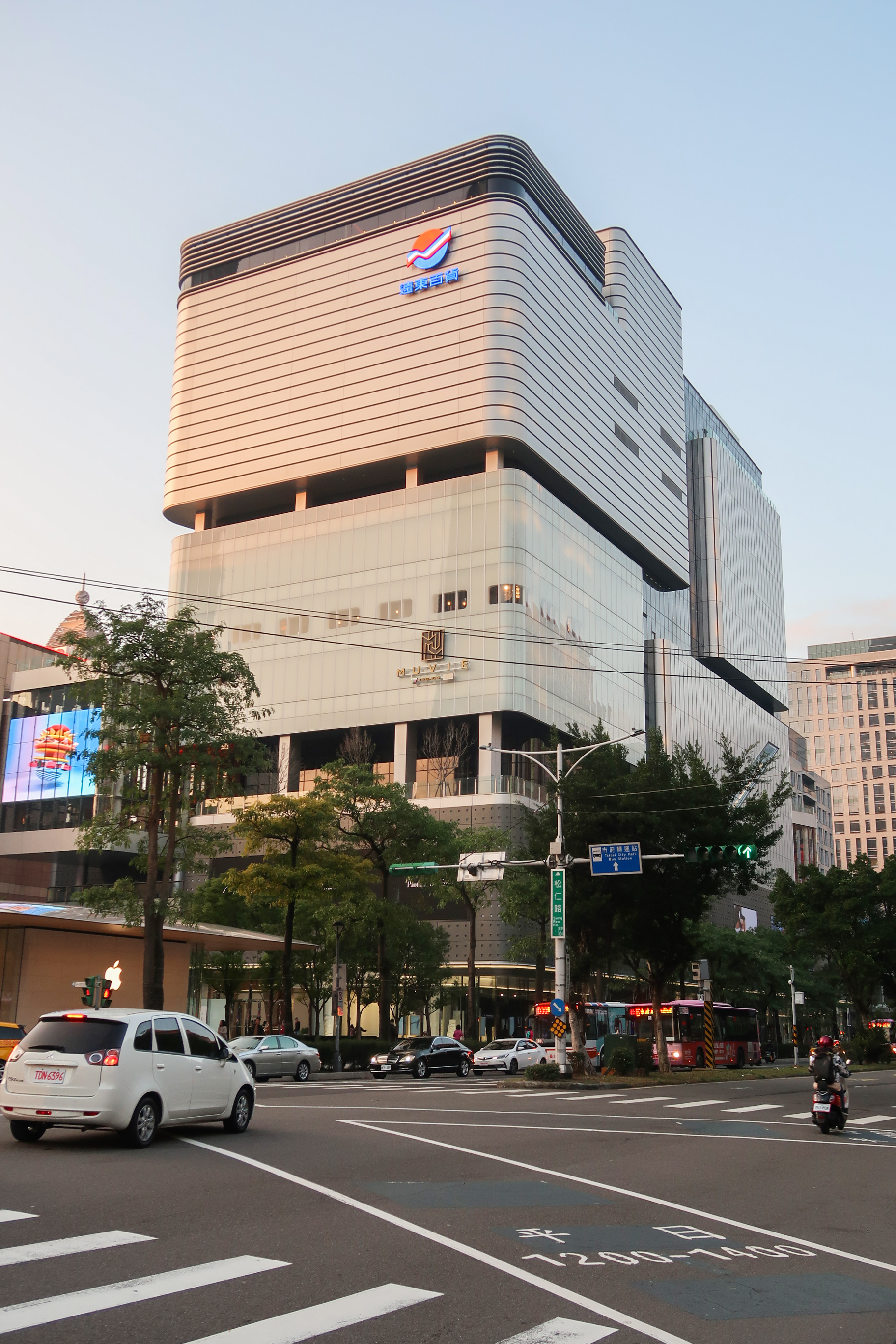
FEDS Xinyi A13 at Xinyi District, Taipei, operated by Far Eastern Department Stores

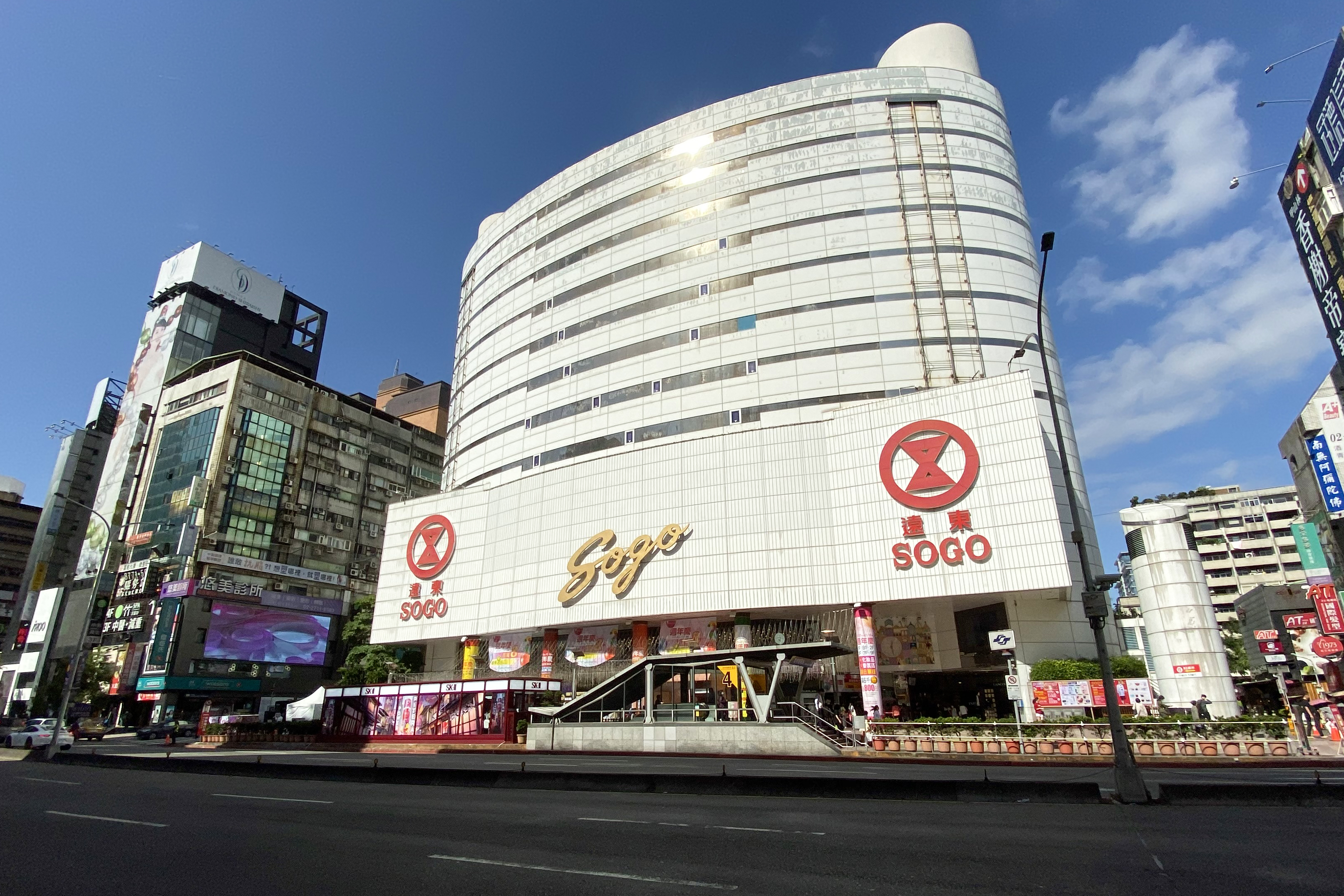
Pacific Sogo

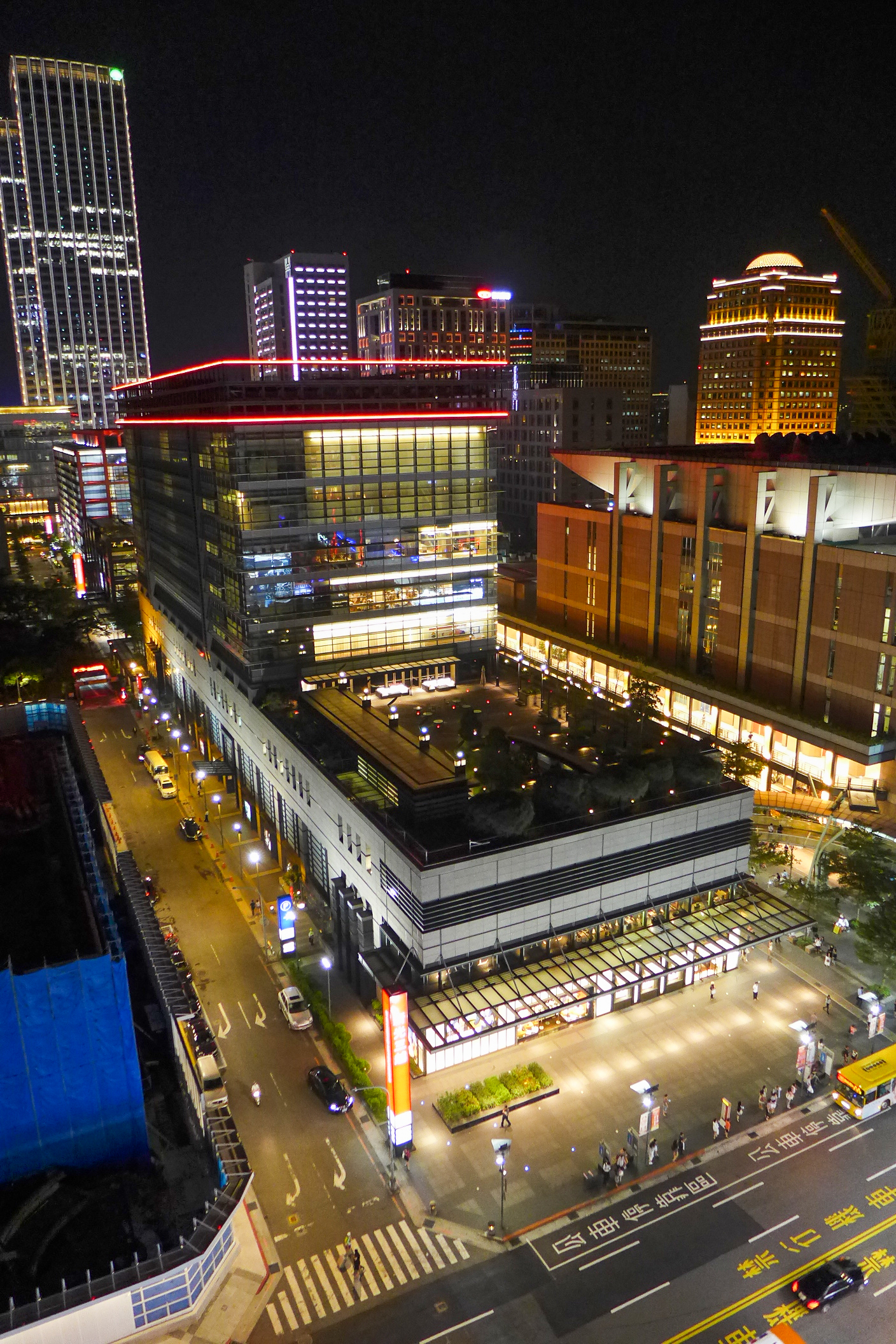
Shin Kong Mitsukoshi at Xinyi District, Taipei

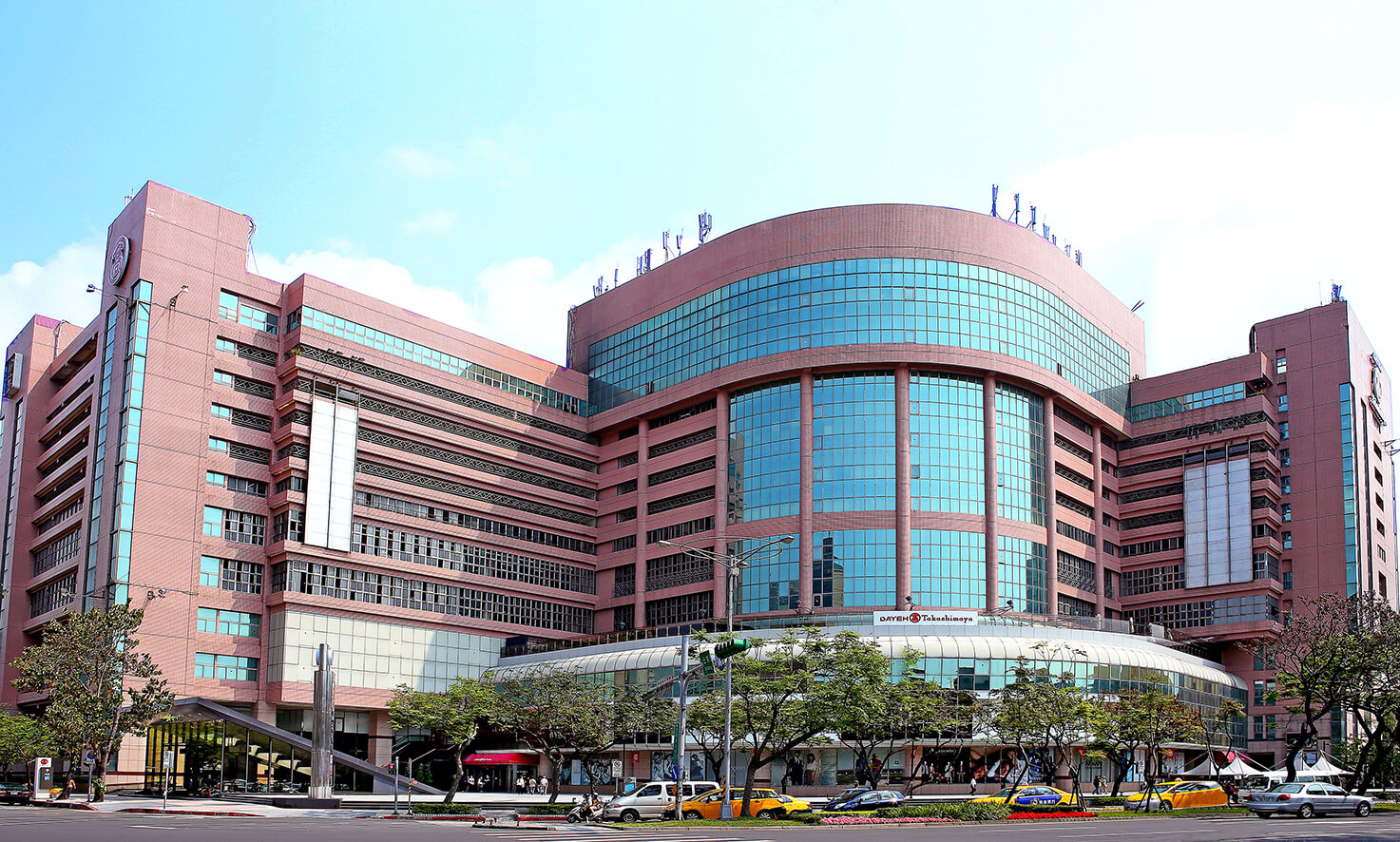
Dayeh Takashimaya Department Store

=== Multi-store operations ===
- Breeze Center (2001-)
- Far Eastern Department Stores (1967-)
- Global Mall (2001-)
- Hanshin Department Store (1995-)
- Pacific Department Store (1989-)
- Pacific Sogo (1986-)
- President Department Store (1975-)
- Shin Kong Mitsukoshi (1989-)
- TRK Corporation (2015-)

=== Single-store operations ===
- Beyond Plaza (2014-)
- Chungyo Department Store (1992-)
- City Plaza (2012-)
- Dayeh Takashimaya Department Store (1992-)
- Edora Park (2013-)
- Epoque Corporation (2020-)
- Focus Square (2000-)
- Hayashi Department Store (1932-1945; 2014-)
- HiMall (2013-)
- Kuang San SOGO Department Store (1995-)
- Landmark Life Plaza (2017-)
- Ming Yao Department Store (1987-)
- Nice Plaza (2006-)
- Park Lane by Splendor (2012-)
- Shin Shin Department Store (1972-)
- Shine Square (2015-)
- Tainan Spinning Co., Ltd. (2014-)
- Tonlin Department Store Co., Ltd. (2018-)
- Tungcheng Development (2007-)
- Uni-President Department Store (2010-)

== Defunct department stores ==
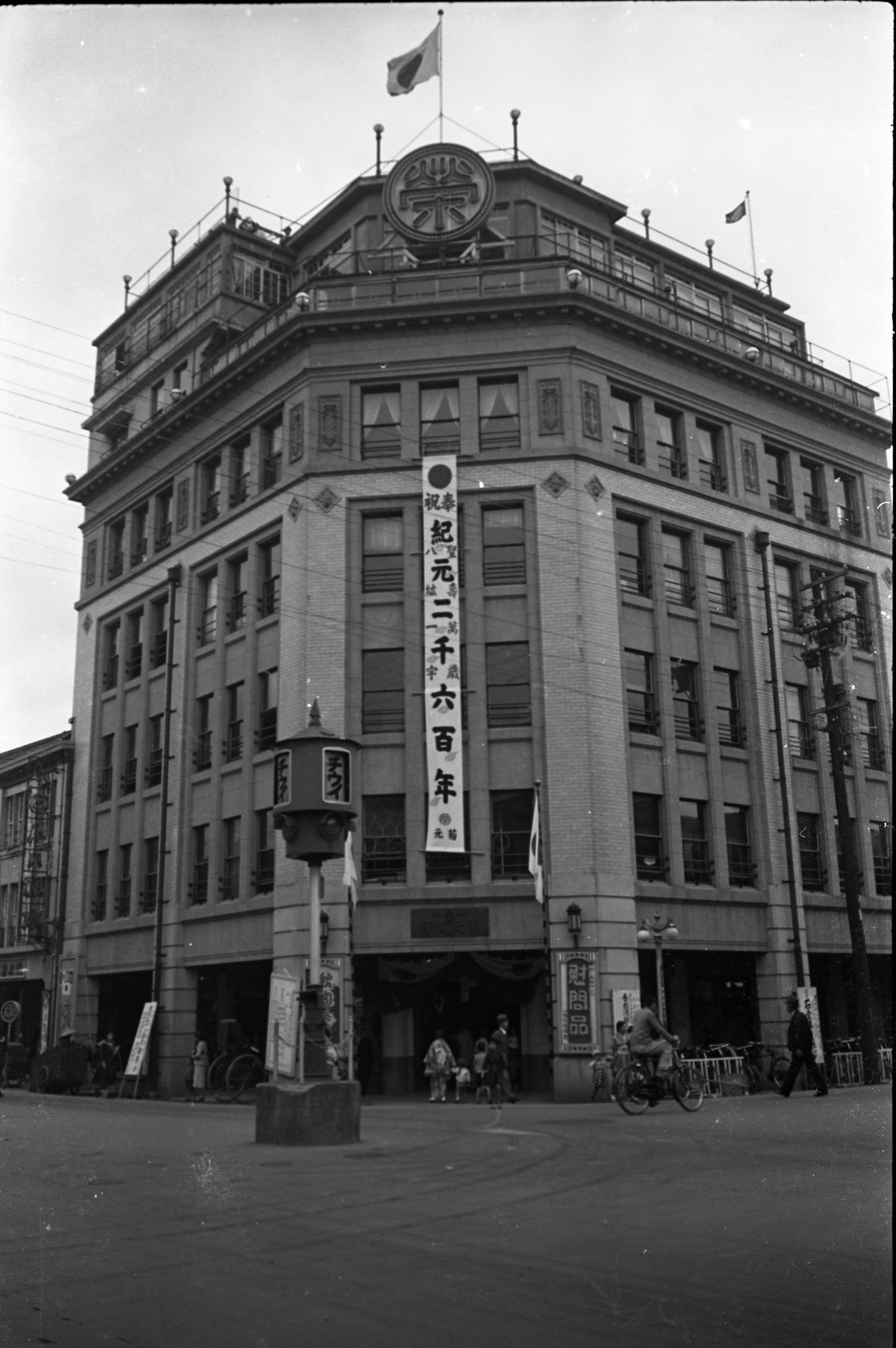
Kikumoto Department Store in 1940

=== Multi-store operations ===
- ACE+TOP1 GO GO SHOPPING (1989-2018)
- Taiwan Aeon (2003-2008)
- EVERGEEN Department (1975-2002)
- IDĒE Fashion store (1995-2008)
- Lai Lai Department Store (1978-2003)
- Taiwan Marks & Spencer (2007-2008)
- Printemps Department Store (1992-2002)
- Sunrise Department Store (1978-2008)
- Taiwan Yaohan (1988-1995)

=== Single-store operations ===
- Chien Tai Daimaru (1999-2002)
- Chin Hua Department Store (1989-2005)
- Durban Department Store (2009-2022)
- Golden Plaza (1999-2001)
- Great World Department Store (2001-2014)
- Kikumoto Department Store (1932-1979)
- Lake Square (2001-2014)
- Lung Shin Department Store (1984-1998)
- Momo Mall (2010-2013)
- Ta Cheng Department Store (1970-1990)
- Tah-shing Department Store (1953-2010)
- Tonlin Plaza (1982-2017)
- Top Department Store (1993-2000)
- Yoai Department Store (1997-2016)
- Yoshii Department Store (1941-1945)

== See also ==
- List of department stores by country § Taiwan
- List of shopping malls in Taiwan
- List of shopping malls in Taipei
