= Linkou =

Linkou (林口) may refer to:

== Mainland China ==
- Linkou County, of Mudanjiang, Heilongjiang
- Linkou, Heilongjiang, county seat of Linkou County
- Linkou, Guizhou, town in Qixingguan District, Bijie

== Taiwan ==
- Linkou District, rural district of New Taipei
- Linkou Line, railway branch line, located in Taoyuan County and New Taipei
- Linkou Station, station on the Linkou Line in Linkou District, New Taipei
- New Taipei Municipal Lin-kou High School (formerly National Linkou High School), a high school in Linkou District, New Taipei
