= Ambassador Theatres =

Taiwanese cinema chain

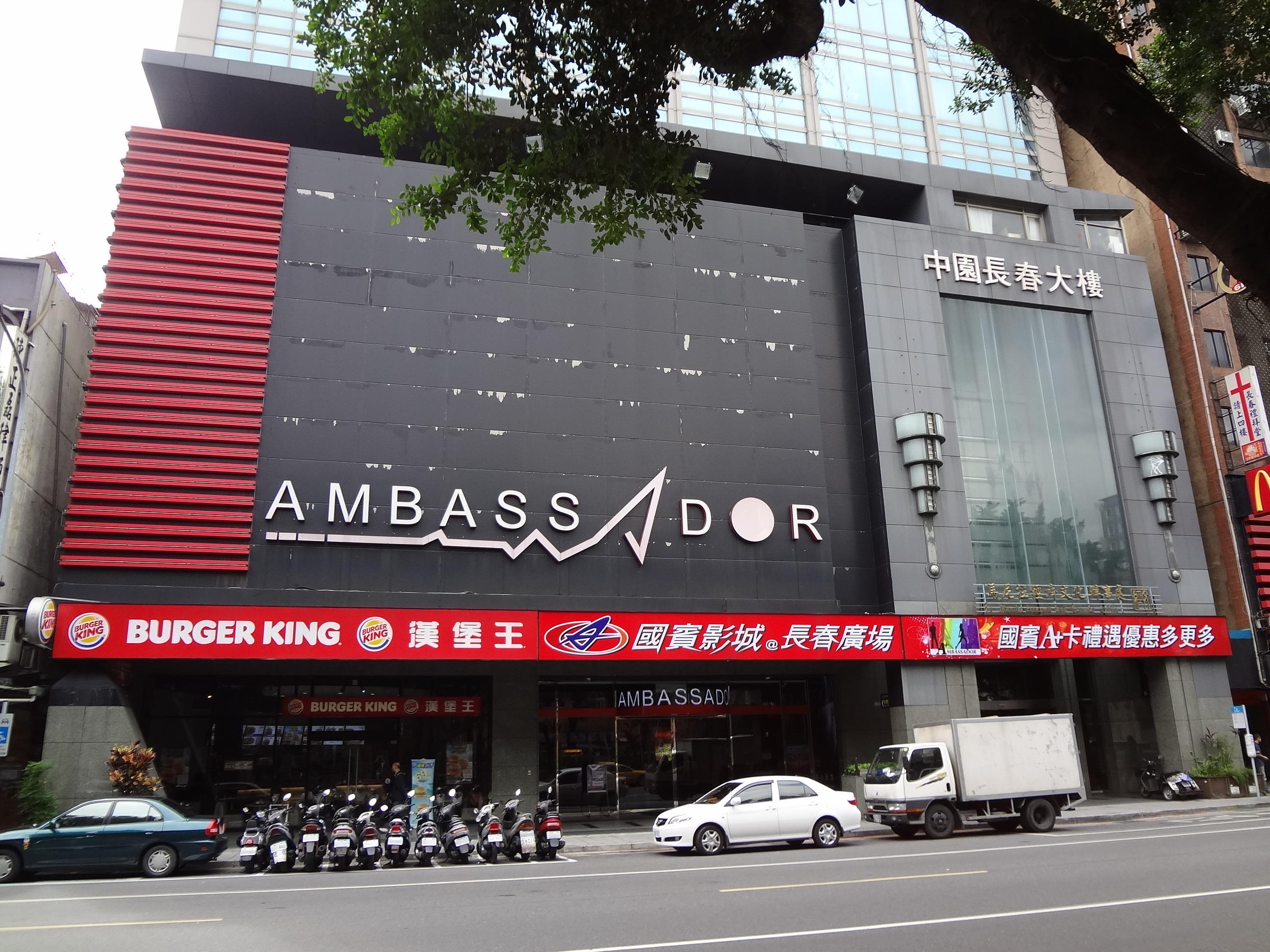
- Company type: Private company
- Industry: media, entertainment
- Founded: 2001
- Headquarters: 23, 4th Floor, Section 1, Changan East Road, Zhongshan District, Taipei, Taiwan
- Number of locations: 13
- Area served: Taiwan
- Website: www.ambassador.com.tw

Ambassador Theatres (Chinese: 國賓影城; pinyin: Gúo Bīn Yǐngchéng) is a Taiwanese cinema chain and the third largest cinema chain in Taiwan. Ambassador Theatres has 11 cinemas and 99 screens in Taiwan currently.

== Business Operations ==
=== Cinemas ===
Cinema	Screens/Halls	Seats	City	Opening Year
Ambassador Theatres Taipei	3	1152	Taipei	
Ambassador Theatres Taipei Breeze	6	1491	Taipei	
Ambassador Theatres @ Spring Center	15	1314	Taipei	
Ambassador Theatres Shine Square	8	943	New Taipei	2015
Ambassador Theatres @ Crown Plaza	13	821	New Taipei	
Ambassador Tamsui	8	888	New Taipei	
Ambassador Zhonghe	7	1368	New Taipei	2012
Ambassador Theatres @ Kwong Fong Plaza	8	1636	Taoyuan	2017
Ambassador Tainan	12	1940	Tainan	
Ambassador Theatres @ E-Da	10	1764	Kaohsiung	2010
Ambassador Theatres @ SKM Park	10	1856	Kaohsiung	2016
Ambassador Pingtung	6	1135	Pingtung	2012
Ambassador Kinmen	6	638	Kinmen County	

== See also ==
- List of cinemas in Taiwan
- Century Asia Cinemas
- In89 Cinemax
- Miranew Cinemas
- Shin Kong Cinemas
- Vieshow Cinemas
