= Eiji Shigeta =

- 重田 榮治
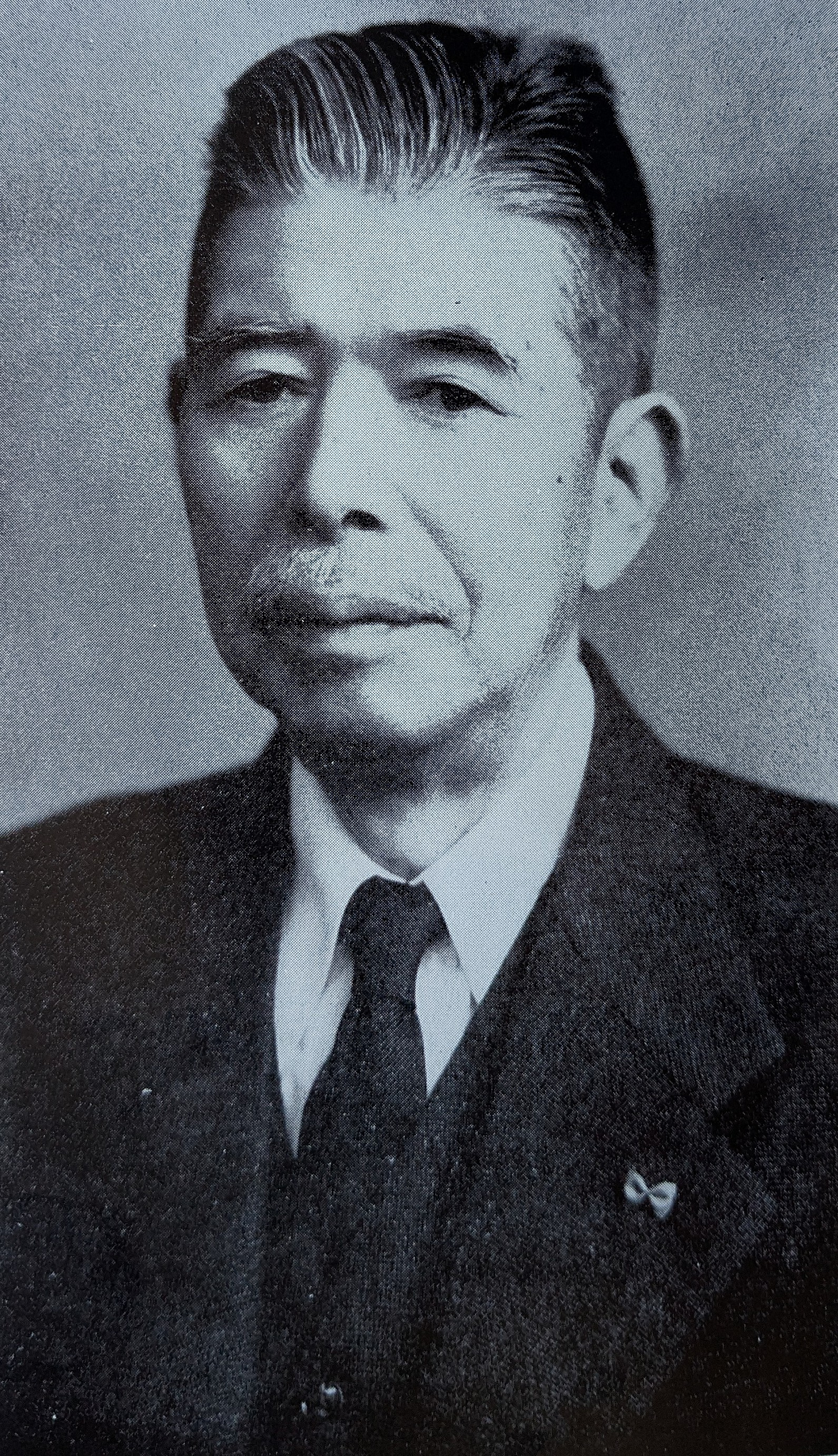
- Shigeta in 1940
- Born: November 8, 1877; Kuga District (now Iwakuni), Yamaguchi Prefecture, Japan
- Died: 1958 (aged 70–71)
- Occupations: President and CEO
- Organization: Kikumoto Department Store
- Children: 3 sons & 4 daughters
- Awards: Order of the Rising Sun

Eiji Shigeta (重田 榮治, Shigeta Eiji; November 8, 1877 – 1958), was a soldier and a businessman during the Japanese colonial period in Taiwan. Born in Yamaguchi Prefecture, Japan, Shigeta was known for opening the Kikumoto Department Store (菊元百貨店) in Taipei City. Kikumoto Department Store was later confiscated by the then Kuomintang government of Taiwan, and Eiji Shigeta and his family were sent back to their hometown in Yamaguchi, Japan.

== Biography ==
Shigeta was born in Kuga-gun (玖珂郡), Yamaguchi Prefecture, Japan (today's Iwakuni, Yamaguchi Prefecture). He joined the Imperial Japanese Army and fought in China during the Eight-Nation Alliance (June 1900), until returning home in November 1900. The following year, Shigeta was awarded the Order of the Rising Sun, and later participated in the Russo-Japanese War. However, Shigeta was tired of the battlefield and loathed war, which made him consider starting a business instead.

In 1903, at the age of 26, Shigeta came to Taiwan to work and engage in the cotton cloth wholesale business. At first, he worked for a wool fabric wholesaler run by locals on South Street (Dadaocheng), Taihoku. In 1926, Shigeta founded the Kikumoto Shoten (菊元商店) in Taihei-cho (太平町, an administrative division of Taipei during the Japanese occupation of Taiwan; now known as Yanping North Road, 延平北路) in Taihoku. It mainly deals in fabrics and gofuku (呉服), and has branches in Minatocho (港町, now known as Tainan) and Xiamen. On November 28, 1932, Shigeta opened the Kikugen Department Store in Sakae-machi, Taihoku (榮町, an administrative divisions of Taihoku, Taiwan; now known as Jhongjheng District). It was the first department store in Taiwan during the Japanese colonial period and one of the three largest department stores in Taiwan. In 1933, Shigeta provided financial support to Nakaji Toshiro (中治稔郎) to build a temple on the eastern hillside of Sanjiaopu (三角埔), Shilin (士林), Taipei City, dedicated to the Mazu (媽祖, lit. Holy Mother of Heaven), and founded the Tianmu religion (天母教). This is the origin of the place name Tianmu (天母).

After the end of WW2 in 1945, all of Shigeta's property was confiscated, and he was repatriated to Iwakuni City, Yamaguchi Prefecture, Japan. When Shigeta boarded the ship on the day of his repatriation, Heitaro Shigeta (重田平太郎), his eldest son, recalled: “My 40 years in Taiwan seemed like a dream.” Shigeta died in 1958. Former employees of Kikugen Department Store later formed the "Kikueikai" (菊栄会) and met regularly to reminisce about the past.

Shigeta had seven children, three sons and four daughters. The second son, Sawada Shigeta, was influenced by his father and joined the anti-war movement, but he was later arrested and executed by the Special Higher Police, and his body has not been found to date. He was also a member of the Taihoku Rotary Club and the Taihoku City Council during the Japanese colonial period. His hobby was gardening.
