= New Taipei Municipal Lin-kou High School =

Coordinates: 25°4′23.9″N 121°22′50.8″E

- 新北市立林口高級中學
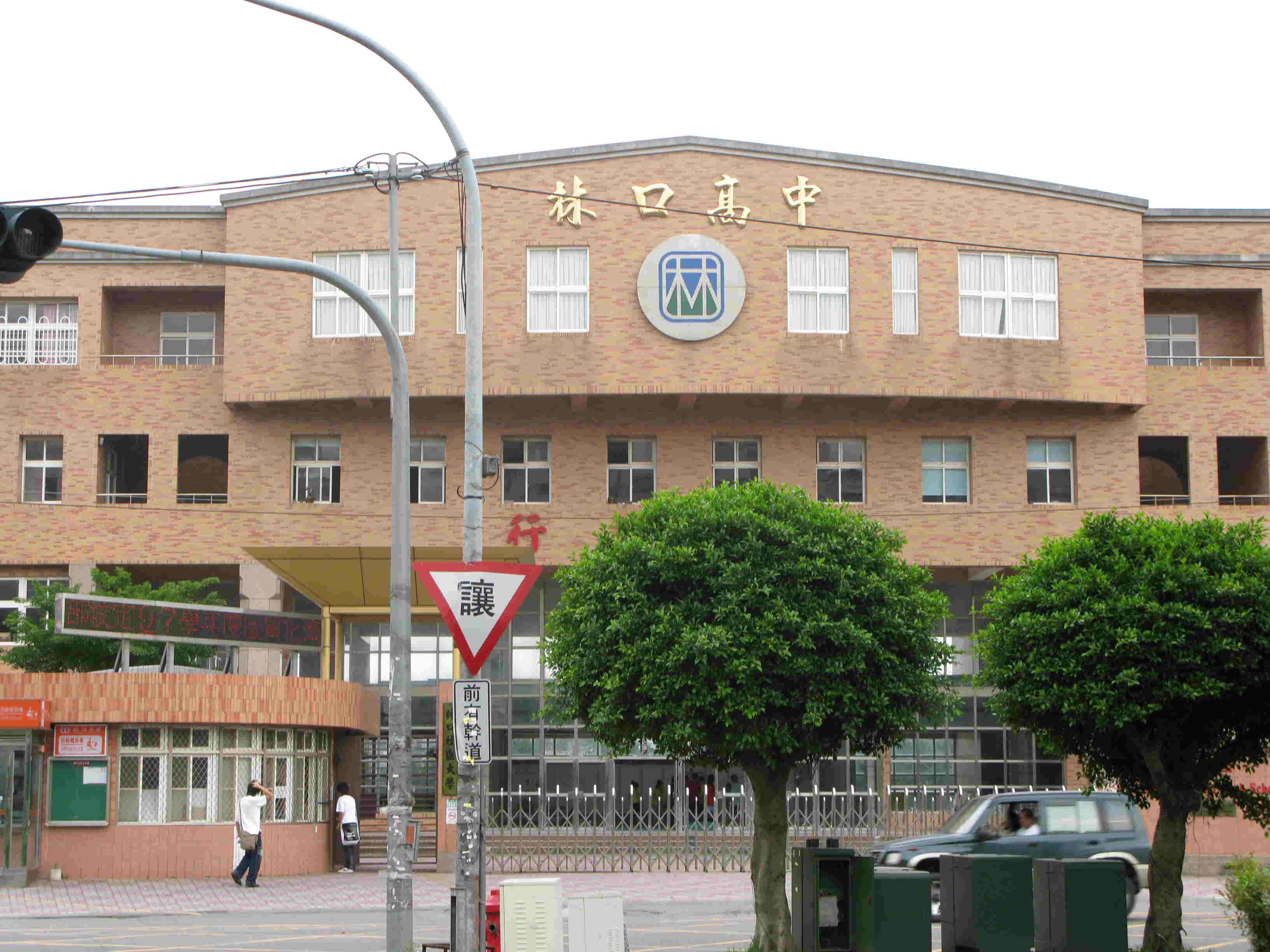
- Linkou, New Taipei, Taiwan

Information
- School type: Public
- Opened: 1 August 2000
- Principal: Shuo-hao Li
- Classes: 45
- Campus size: 5 hectares

New Taipei Municipal Lin-kou Senior High School (LKSH; Chinese: 新北市立林口高級中學), previously National Linkou High School (Chinese: 國立林口高級中學), is a high school in Linkou District, New Taipei, Taiwan.

== History ==
On April 24, 1995, the preliminary offices of the school (then planned as the Linkou High School) were established under the permission of Taiwan Education Department. On August 1, 1998, Chang Pao-kuang, the director of the Bureau of Education, was assigned to be the director of the Linkou High School's preliminary office, beginning the school's blueprinting. On February 1, 2000, the planned school was nationalised and thus renamed as the National Linkou High School.

On August 1, 2000 the school opened with 10 classes during its first year, with plans to expand 45 classes. Chang Pao-kuang became the school's first principal. On January 1, 2013 the school's governance was handed to the New Taipei municipality, leading to its present name, the New Taipei Municipal Linkou Senior High School.

As of 2013 the school has a total of 45 classes, with 15 per grade.

== Student life ==
=== Natural Science Contest ===
The school offers a focus on the education of the sciences and mathematics and has held a nationwide event called, “the International Year of Chemistry”, in association with the Chemistry Course Center in Taiwan.

=== Observatory ===
The school's science building is equipped with an observatory, featuring astronomical telescopes with auto-tracking and control functions.

== See also ==
- Education in Taiwan
