= Yoshii Department Store =

Demolished building in Kaohsiung, Taiwan

- 吉井デパート
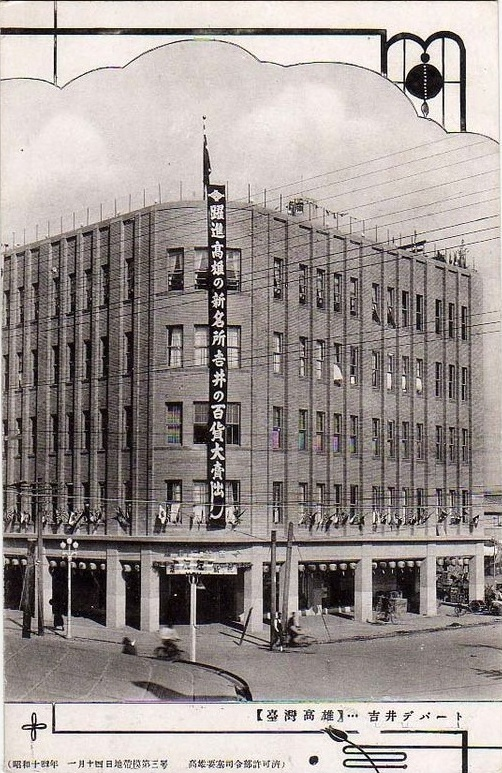
- Yoshii Department Store, photographed in 1939
- Interactive map of the Yoshii Department Store area
- Alternative names: Jijin Department Store (吉井百貨)

General information
- Location: Yancheng District, Kaohsiung, Taiwan
- Opened: 1938
- Demolished: 1994

Technical details
- Floor count: 5

The Yoshii Department Store (Japanese: 吉井デパート, romanized: Yoshii Depāto), also known as Jijin Department Store (Chinese: 吉井百貨) or "Five-story one" (Chinese: 五層樓仔), was a department store located in Enteichō, Takao (now Yancheng District, Kaohsiung). Along with Hayashi Department Store in Tainan and Kikumoto Department Store in Taihoku (now Taipei), Yoshii was one of the three major department stores in Taiwan during its Japanese colonial period. It was the first department store in Kaohsiung.

== History ==
Founded in 1938 by Yoshii Chōhei from Shiga, the store traced its business roots back to 1908 when Yoshii first arrived in Taiwan and started his business in Taihoku. Seeing opportunities in Takao, Yoshii moved to Kî-āu, Takao (now Cijin, Kaohsiung) in the same year and started selling Western goods. Over time, Yoshii opened five branches in Takao and established the company's headquarters at Kotobukichō (now Shoushan) in 1921. Later, Yoshii commissioned Okuno Sutejiro (Japanese: 奥野捨次郎) to construct a five-story building at the headquarters, which became Yoshii Department Store later. It was the first department store in Takao.

During the final stages of World War II, the Allies started bombing Takao due to its strategic importance to the Japanese southern expansion. While Yoshii Department Store was affected by the bombings, its main structure remained intact. Following the war, the department store was taken over by Huang Yao (Chinese: 黃堯), a member of the Taiwan Representative Council, and continued its operation as "Kaohsiung Department Store" (Chinese: 高雄百貨) until Ta Shing Department Store opened nearby, leading to Yoshii's closure. The building was later sold to Hua Nan Bank and demolished in 1994. According to Wu Yao-ting, founder of Ta Shing Department Store, his motivation to start the competing store stemmed from a negative experience at Yoshii. At the age of 17, Wu was insulted by the staff while shopping there, which inspired him to establish a department store with better customer service.

== Gallery ==
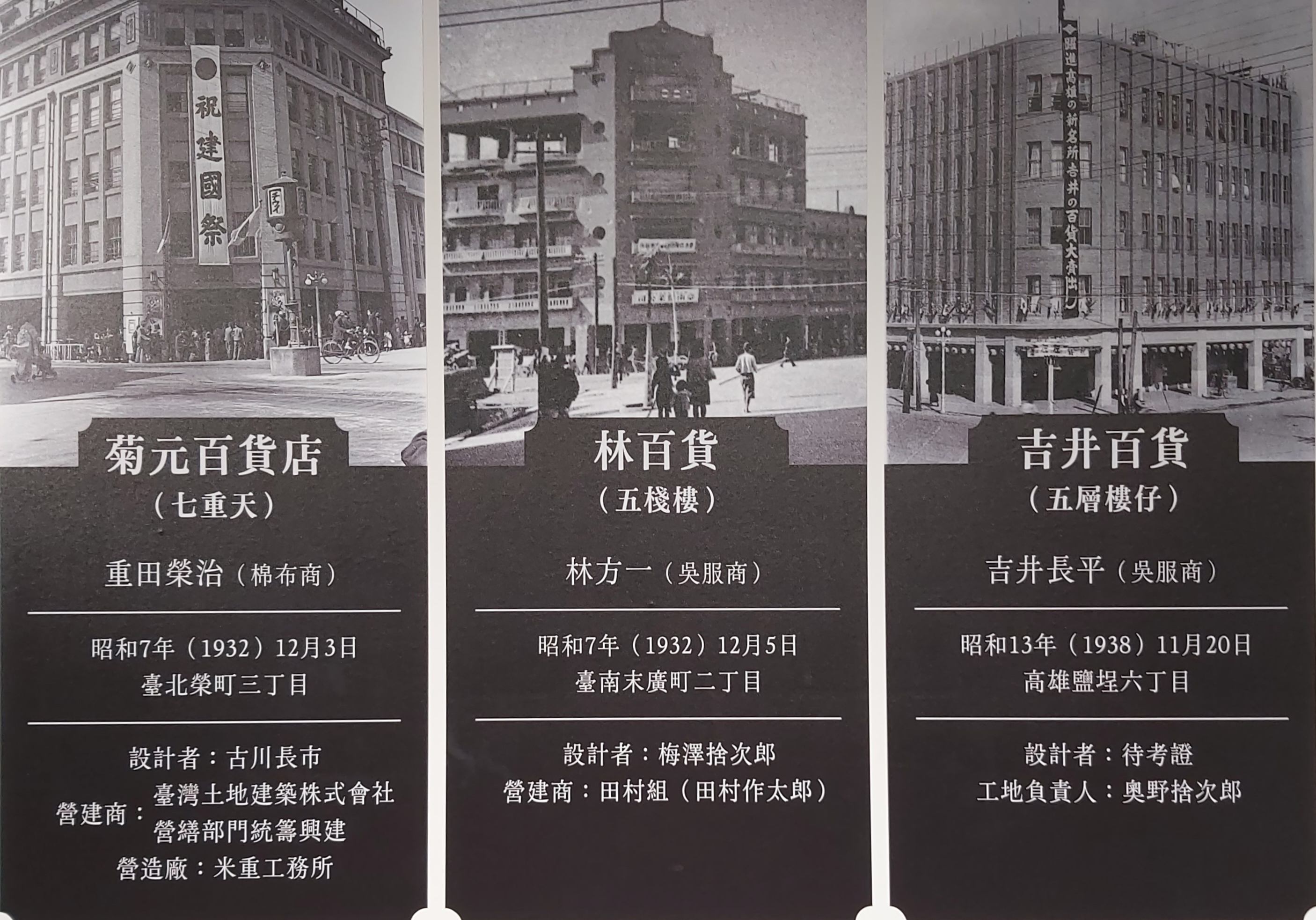
Kikumoto, Hayashi, and Yoshii

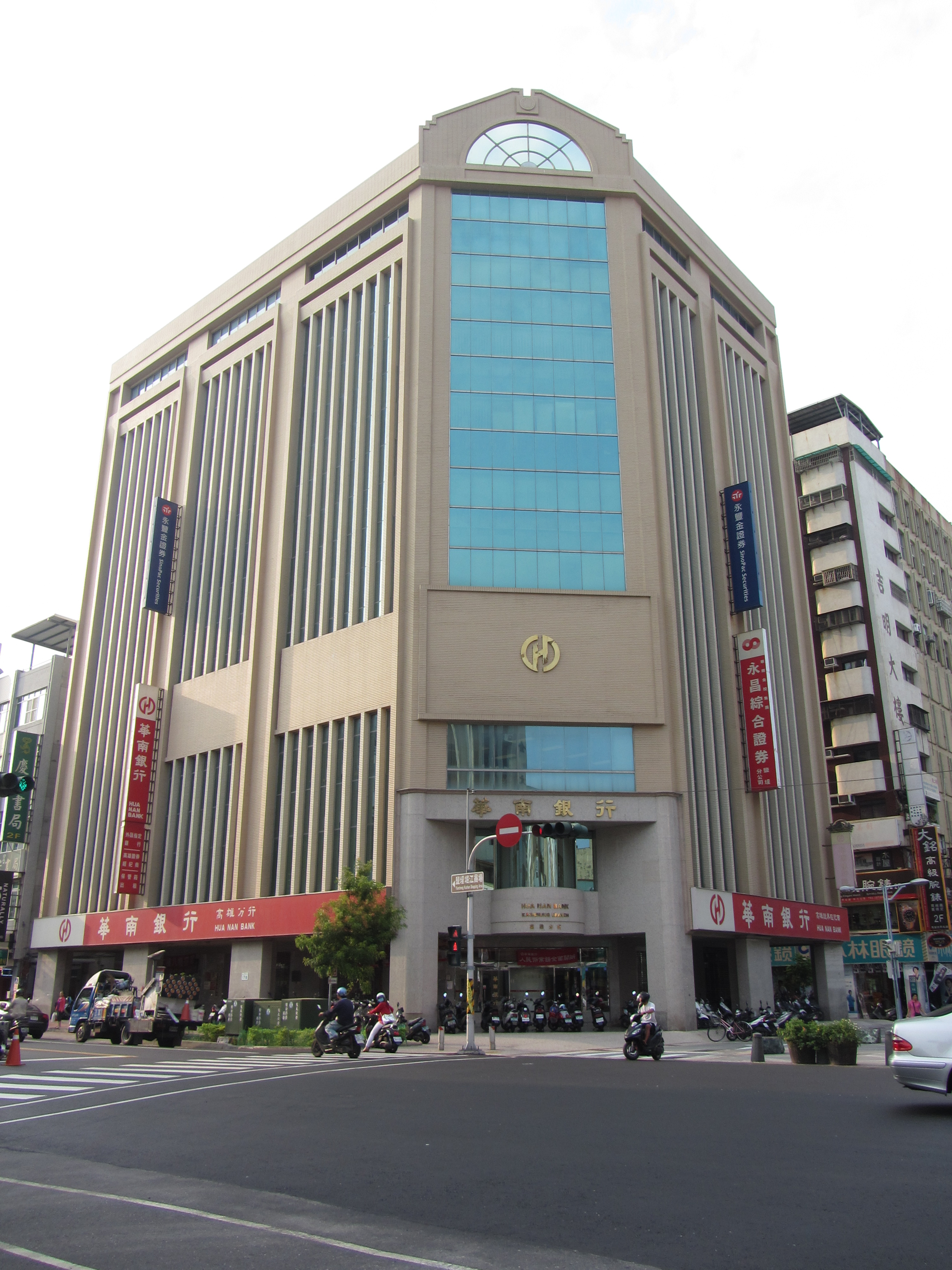
The Hua Nan Bank Kaohsiung Branch Building, built after Yoshii Department Store was demolished

== See also ==
- Kikumoto Department Store in Taikohu
- Hayashi Department Store in Tainan
