= Kikumoto Department Store =

- 菊元百貨
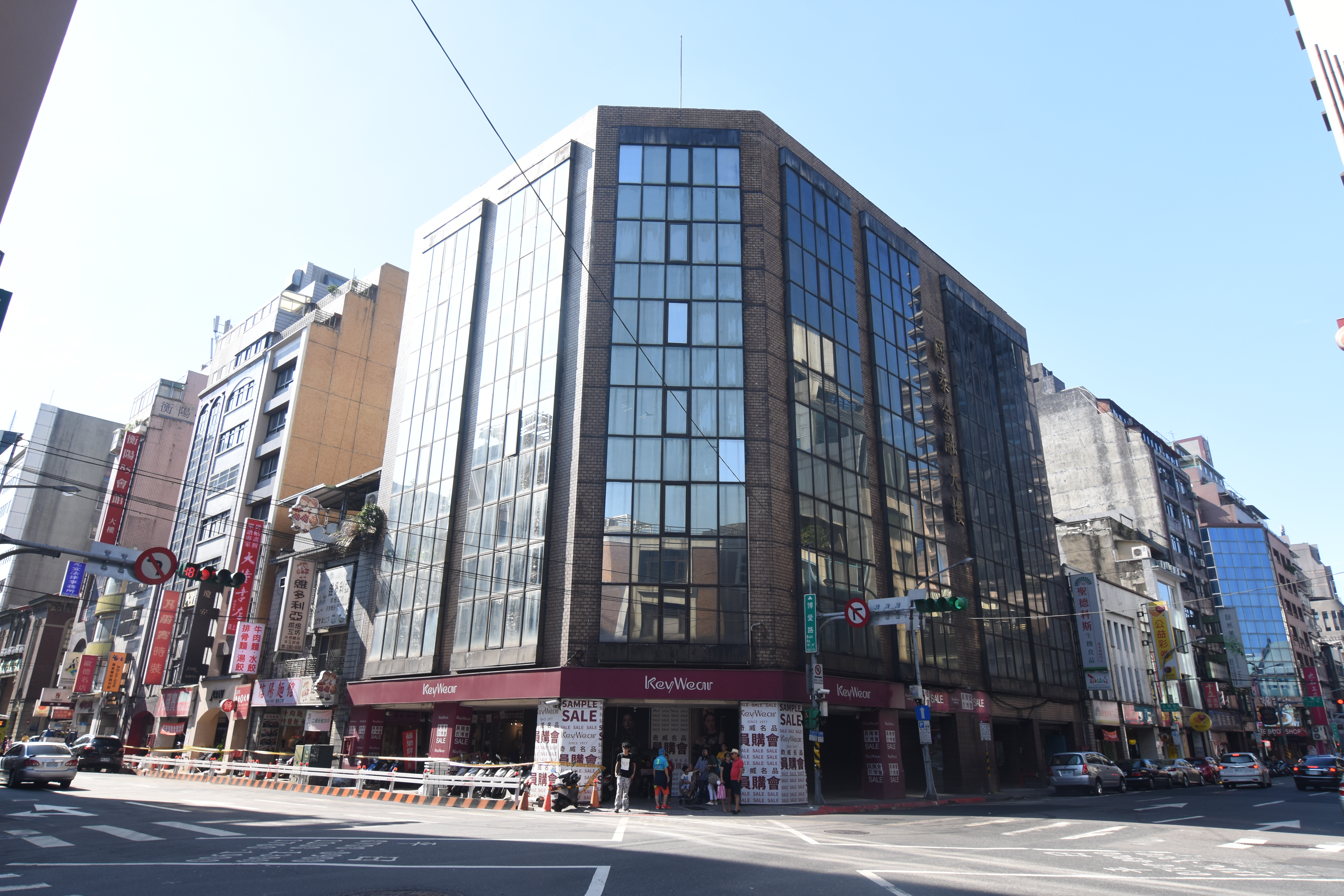
- Kikumoto Department Store building, photographed in 2017
- Interactive map of the Kikumoto Department Store area
- Alternative names: Juyuan Department Store

General information
- Location: Zhongzheng District, Taipei, Taiwan
- Coordinates: 25°02′32.43″N 121°30′54.26″E
- Year built: 1932
- Opened: November 28, 1932
- Renovated: July 26, 2024
- Owner: Cathay United Bank

Technical details
- Floor count: 7

Kikumoto Department Store (Japanese: 菊元百貨店), also known as Juyuan Department Store (Chinese: 菊元百貨), was a department store in Sakaechō, Taihoku (now Zhongzheng District, Taipei), Taiwan. It was founded by the Japanese entrepreneur Eiji Shigeta (重田榮治) on November 28, 1932, and officially opened on December 3. Along with Hayashi Department Store in Tainan and Yoshii Department Store in Takao (now Kaoshiung), Kikumoto was one of the three major department stores in Taiwan during its Japanese colonial period. It was the first department store in Taiwan.

Nicknamed "seven-storied sky" (Chinese: 七重天) for its seven-story building, Kikumoto Department Store was the second tallest structure in Taiwan, surpassed only by the Presidential Office Building. The department store introduced some of the most advanced facilities in Taiwan, including the first commercial passenger elevator, and became the symbol of prosperity in Sakaechō. After World War Two, the department store was taken over by the Nationalist Government and continued to operate until its closure in 1979. The department store building was officially designated a Historic Building of Taiwan in 2017.

== History ==
=== Under Japanese rule period ===
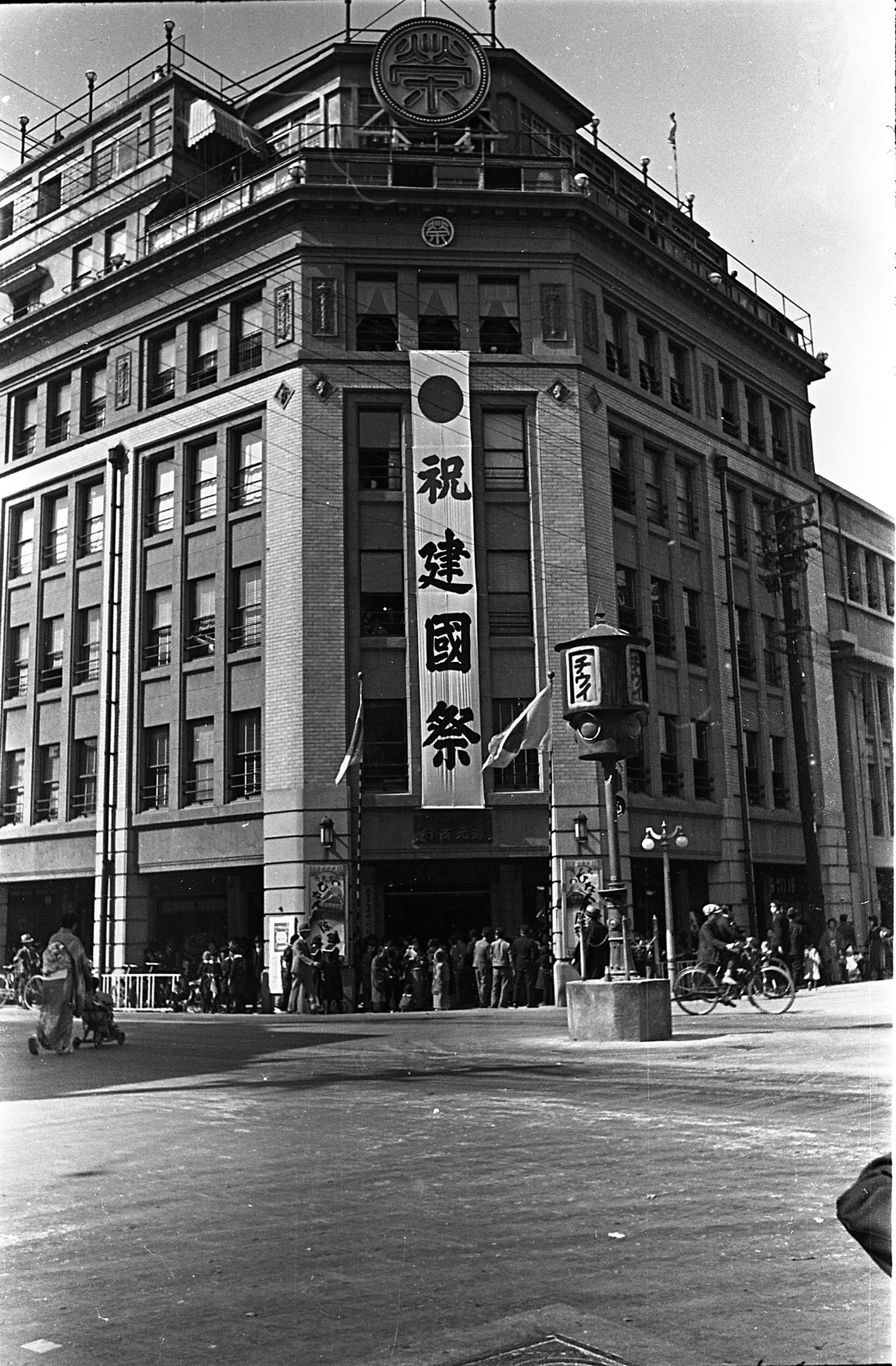
Kikumoto Department Store, photographed in 1942

Eiji Shigeta, a businessman born in Yamaguchi, Japan, began his cotton cloth business in Taiwan when he was 26. He established Kikumoto Department Store on November 28, 1932, after knowing that Japanese retailers Mitsukoshi and Takashimaya were considering opening department stores in Taiwan. At the time, Taiwan was in the middle period of Japanese rule. During the store's completion ceremony, Shigeta invited several high-ranking officials and prominent local figures, including Ueda Shunkichi, director of shokusan in Government-General of Taiwan (Japanese: 台湾総督府殖産局, ja); Nakase Setsuo, Governor of Taihoku Prefecture; and Gichō Nishizawa, Mayor of Taihoku Prefecture. The department store officially opened to the public on December 3, 1932.

The Kikumoto Department Store building stood seven stories high, with six floors and a rooftop. At the time, the store self-proclaimed to be the tallest building in Taiwan, earning it the nickname "seven-storied sky." The department store was associated with Kikumoto Trading Co, Ltd. (Japanese: 株式会社菊元商行), which was also involved in wholesale, retail, and managing its Takao branch.

The restaurant on the fifth floor was also famous in Taiwan at the time. Many visitors came to see the department store's elevator and its operator, as such features were rare during that time. In 1939, a journalist writing for the Taiwan Geijutsu Simpo described its female elevator operator as:

...a golden teeth sparkles when she smiles, just like a younger version of Kiyoko Izumi with a well-developed body... every man would daydream about her upon hearing her clear voice. She will even push young men out of the elevator if they have stayed too long.

— 霞中生男, 島都百貨店菊元漫步記

The department store was called "the window of modernization in Taiwan" for its remarkable records. A tie sold by Kikumoto Department Store, now exhibited in the National Museum of Taiwan History serves as evidence that Taihoku was a modern city with a distinct and notable fashion trend.

On December 1, 1934, the Japan Travel Bureau Foundation (JTB Corporation today) Taihoku branch was established in Kikumoto Department Store.

After World War Two, the Government of the Republic of China confiscated Shigeta's properties, and the Shigeta family was sent to Yamaguchi, Japan. Former staff later established Juronghui (Chinese: 菊榮會), and get together regularly to reminisce. The event continues today even after Eiji Shigeta died.

=== Under Nationalist Government rule period ===
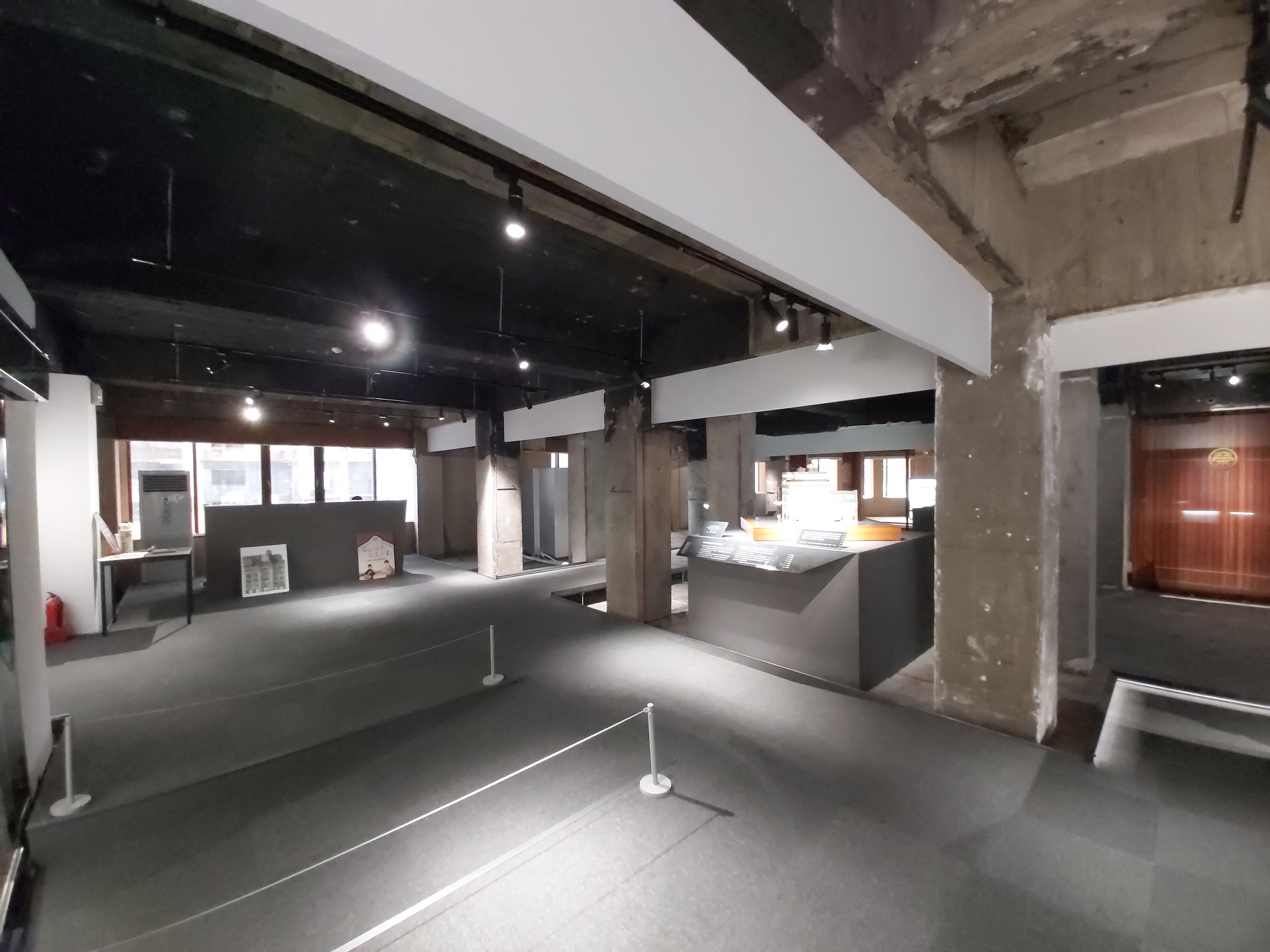
Renovation exhibition of Kikumoto Department Store in the building

Kikumoto Department Store was re-established as "Shin Tai Department Store" (Chinese: 新台百貨公司) on October 24, 1945. It was taken over by the Government of the Republic of China and rebranded as "Taiwan Chung Hua department store" (Chinese: 台灣中華國貨公司) in 1948. The building also served as the headquarters of the Friends of Armed Forces Association during the time. In 1968, Gong Han-Sheng (Chinese: 龔漢生), owner of Nanyang Department Store (Chinese: 南洋百貨), purchased the building. Following Nanyang's bankruptcy in 1977, Yeh Yi-Ren (Chinese: 葉依仁) acquired the property and rebranded it as "Young Young Department Store" (Chinese: 洋洋百貨). Young Young declared bankruptcy in 1979, and Yeh Yi-Ren fled overseas. The building was subsequently taken over by Cathay United Bank.

In 2017, the Taipei City Government designated the building as a historic building of Taiwan rather than a heritage building, as Hayashi Department Store had been classified. This decision sparked criticism from cultural heritage groups, who launched a campaign urging the government to grant it heritage status. In response, Cathay United Bank explained that the building no longer retains its original appearance, but promised that key elements of its design, including the facade and arcade, would be preserved during renovations.

On July 26, 2024, Cathay United Bank launched a reconstruction plan for the Kikumoto Department Store. It also hold an exhibition from July 26, 2024, to January 5, 2025.

== Gallery ==
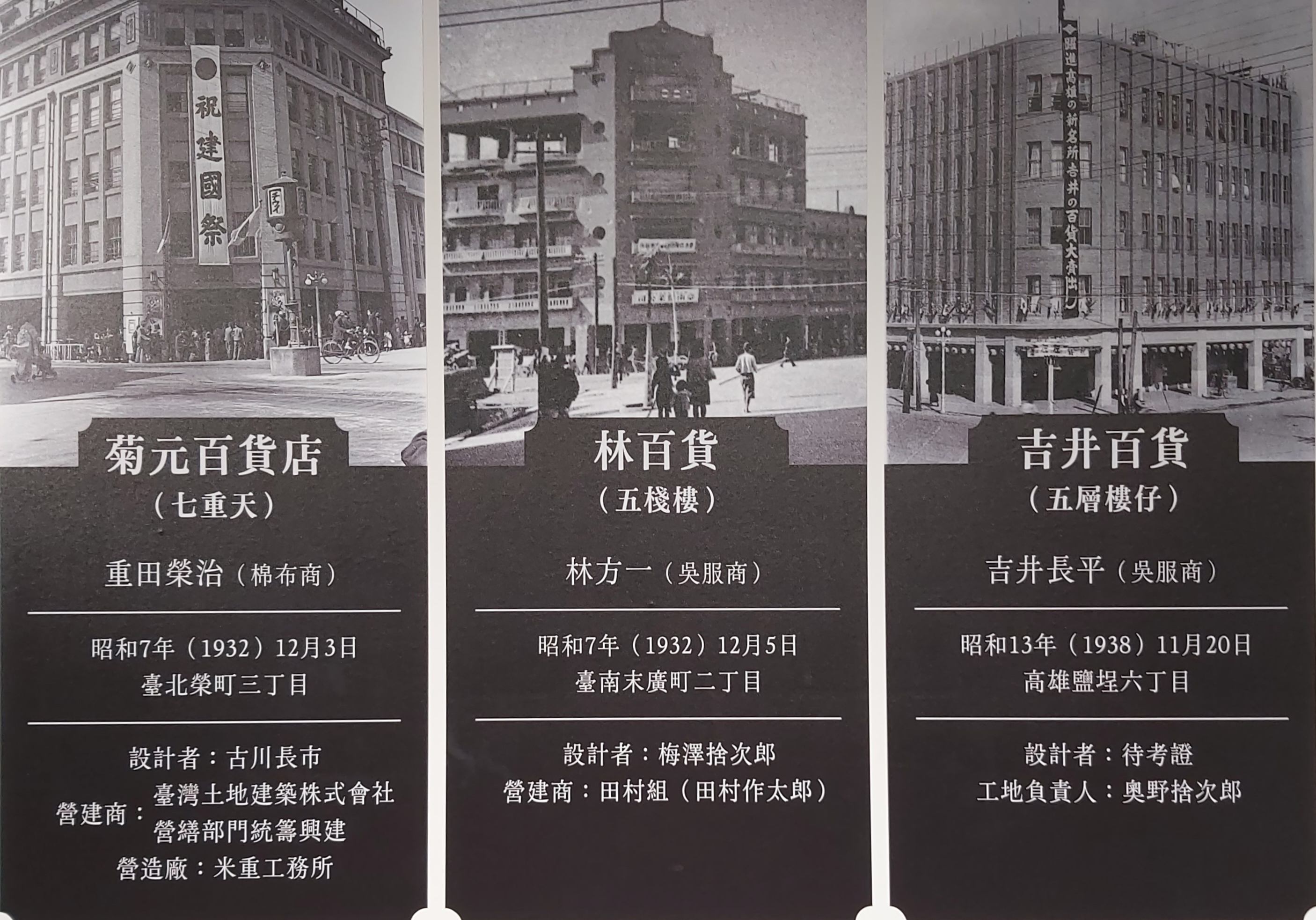
Kikumoto, Hayashi, and Yoshii

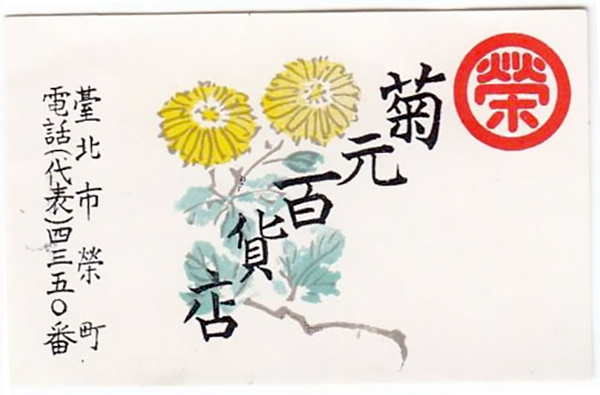
Matchbox from Kikumoto Department Store

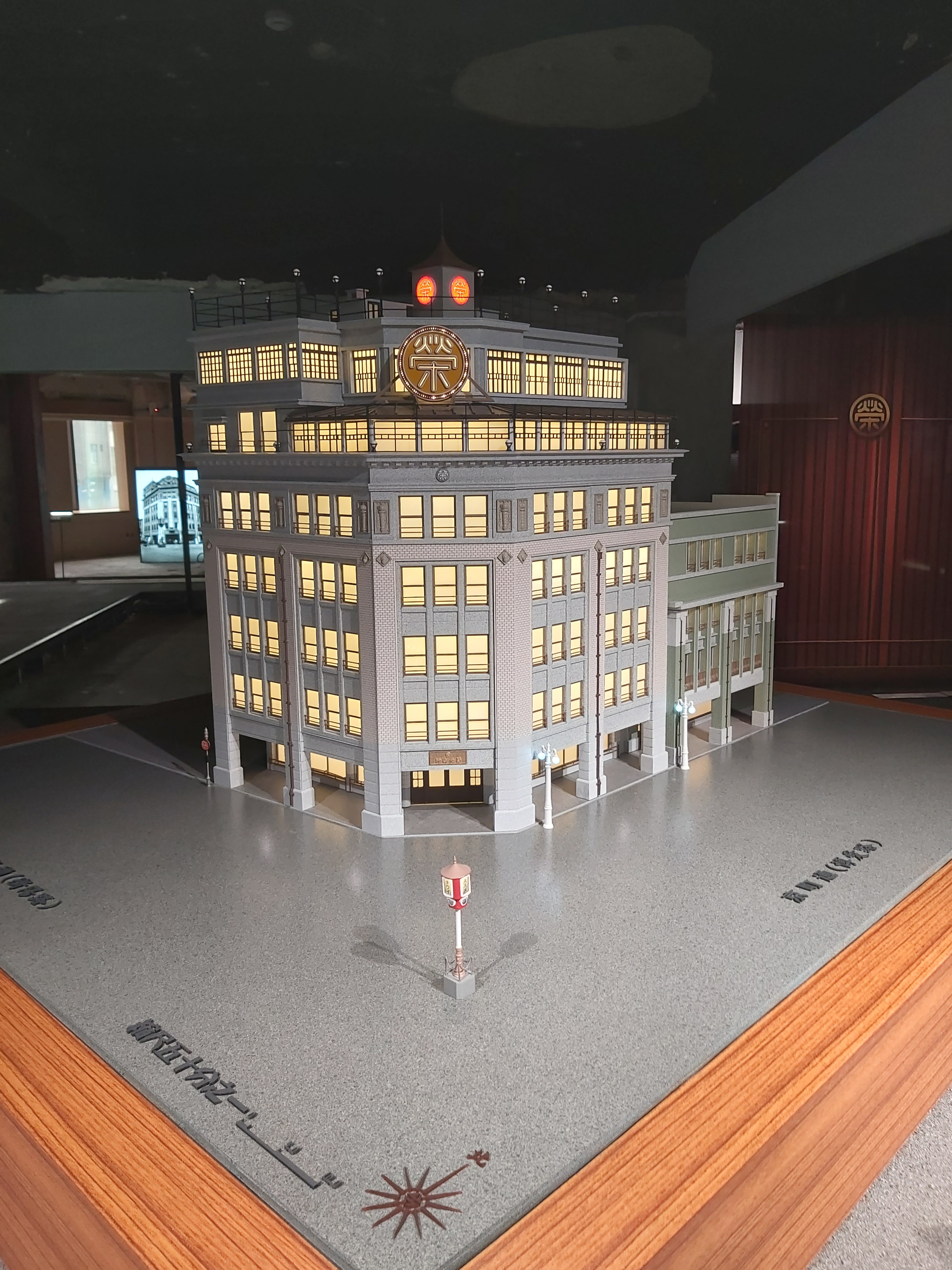
Replica of Kikumoto Department Store

== See also ==
- Hayashi Department Store: the second department store in Tainan, established two days after Kikumoto. Rebooted in 2014.
- Yoshii Department Store: the third department store in Kaoshiung. Demolished in 1994.
