= Park Lane by Splendor =

Shopping center in West, Taichung, Taiwan

- 金典綠園道

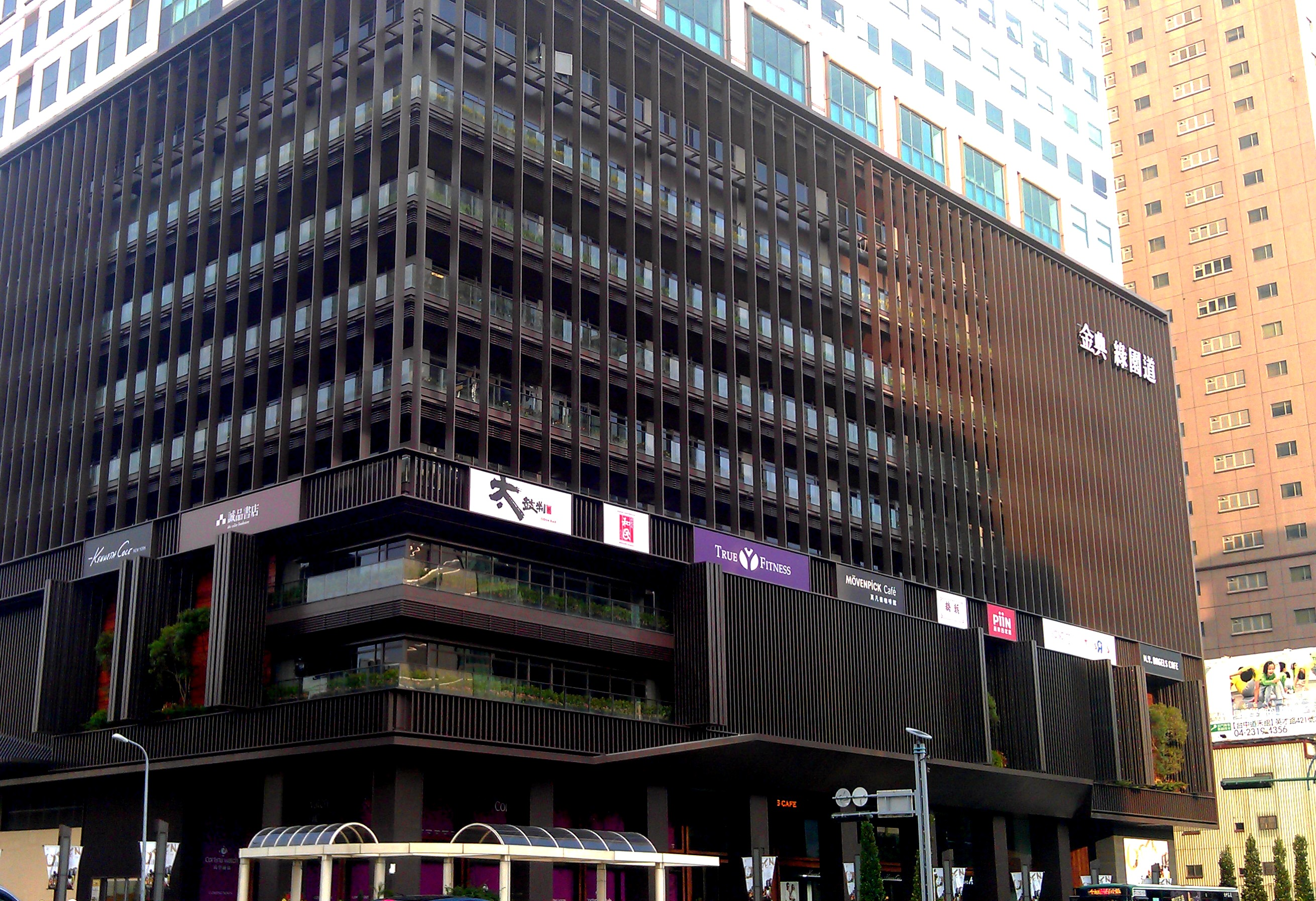
- Location: No. 1049, Jianxing Road, West District, Taichung, Taiwan
- Coordinates: 24°09′21″N 120°39′47″E
- Opened: 18 January 2012
- Floor area: 26,400 m^{2} (284,000 sq ft)
- Floors: 9 floors above ground, 1 floor below ground
- Website: www.parklanes.com.tw

Park Lane by Splendor (Chinese: 金典綠園道; pinyin: Jīndiǎn Lǜyuándào) is a shopping center located in West District, Taichung, Taiwan. The mall opened on January 18, 2012 and is located in the lower floors of The Splendor Hotel Taichung. Main core stores of the mall include Muji, Eslite Bookstore, Studio A, and various themed restaurants.

== History ==
- Park Lane by Splendor officially opened on January 18, 2012.
- In September 2017, the 1,300 m^{2} (14,000 sq ft) space on the third floor of the mall was renovated and transformed into the Taichung Sixth Market. It houses 50 stalls and became Taiwan's first exquisite traditional market located inside a shopping mall.

== See also ==
- List of tourist attractions in Taiwan
- The Splendor Hotel Taichung
- Park Lane by CMP
