= Linkou District =

District in New Taipei, Taiwan

Linkou 林口區 Rinkō
- District
- Linkou District

- Location of Linkou in New Taipei City
- Coordinates: 25°06′06″N 121°21′47″E
- Country: Republic of China (Taiwan)
- Region: Northern Taiwan
- Special municipality: New Taipei City (新北市)

Area
  - Total: 54.15 km^{2} (20.91 sq mi)

Population (February 2023)
  - Total: 128,929
  - Density: 2,381/km^{2} (6,167/sq mi)
- Time zone: UTC+8 (CST)
- Postal code: 244
- Website: www.linkou.ntpc.gov.tw (in Chinese)

Linkou District
- Chinese: 林口區
Transcriptions
Standard Mandarin
- Hanyu Pinyin: Línkǒu Qū
- Bopomofo: ㄌㄧㄣˊ ㄎㄡˇ ㄑㄩ
- Tongyong Pinyin: Línkǒu Cyu
Hakka
- Romanization: Nà-khiéu Khî
Southern Min
- Hokkien POJ: Nâ-kháu khu

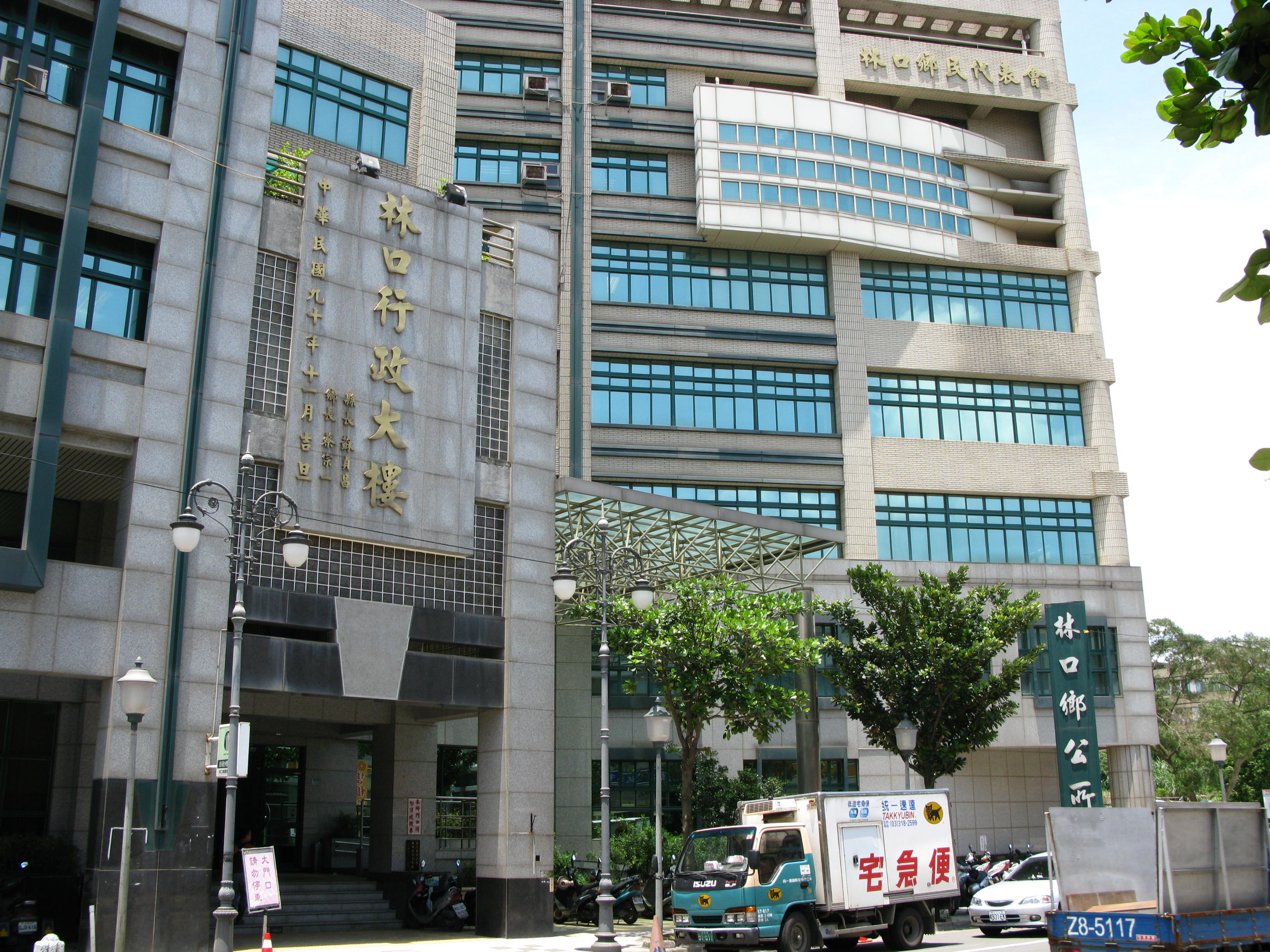
Linkou Administration Building and Linkou Township Council Building

Linkou District (Chinese: 林口區; pinyin: Línkǒu Qū; Pe̍h-ōe-jī: Nâ-kháu khu) is a district in the northwestern part of New Taipei City in northern Taiwan. The name "Linkou" translates to "forest mouth"; in fact, for much of its history, Linkou remained a relatively rural and undeveloped district. This has recently begun to change: Since the latter half of the 2010s, Linkou has been undergoing a period of rapid population growth and land development relative to other nearby districts.

== Geography ==
As of February 2023, Linkou District had a population of 128,929, an increase of over 41% compared to the population in 2011 – giving it one of the fastest population growth rates in New Taipei City. Linkou has a land area of 54.15 km^{2}, including many forested areas and canyons.

== Administrative divisions ==
The district administers 17 urban villages (all seventeen of which were rural villages (村) before changes made on 25 December 2010):

- Donglin (東林里)
- Linkou (林口里)
- Xilin (西林里)
- Jinghu (菁湖里)
- Zhonghu (中湖里)
- Hubei (湖北里)
- Hunan (湖南里)
- Nanshi (南勢里)
- Renai (仁愛里)
- Lilin (麗林里)
- Dongshi (東勢里)
- Liyuan (麗園里)
- Dingfu (頂福里)
- Xiafu (下福里)
- Jiabao (嘉寶里)
- Ruiping (瑞平里)
- Taiping (太平里) Village

== Linkou New Town ==
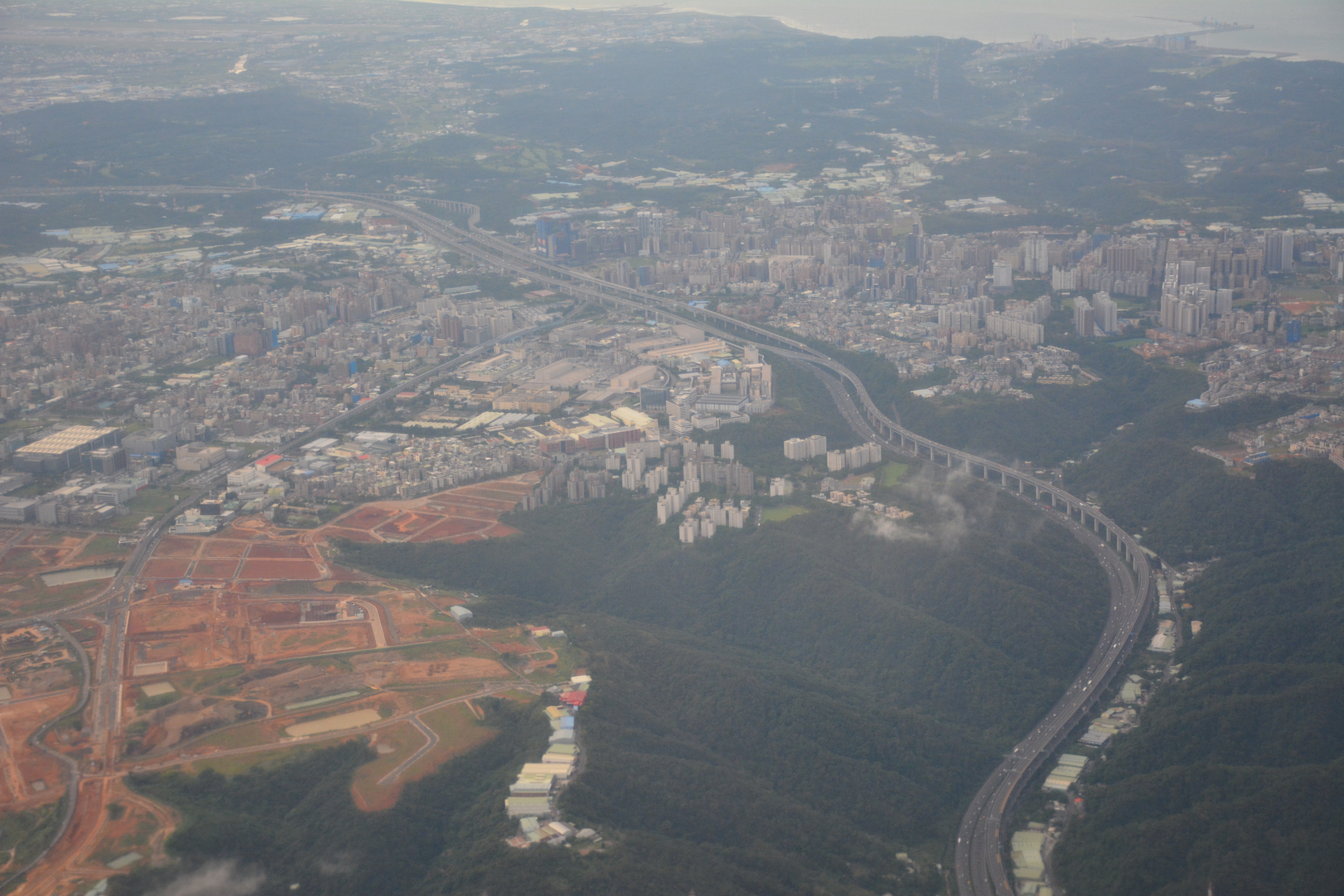
Aerial view of Linkou New Town

Since 1968, the government has planned to establish a new town in Linkou to relieve the overcrowded Taipei City. In 1975, it was released and implemented with the Linkou Interchange of National Freeway 1 as the center, including the planning of both industrial and residential areas. To the north of Linkou Interchange is Linkou District, New Taipei City, and to the south is Guishan District, Taoyuan City. The new town spans the two cities but was still named Linkou. However, some facilities and businesses in the planned new town that use "Linkou" in their name, such as Linkou Chang Gung Memorial Hospital and Fullon Hotel Linkou, are actually located in Guishan District rather than Linkou District.

At the early stages, development of the new town was slow due to various reasons, and the original estimated scale of 250,000 people was also reduced to 80,000. It was pointed out that the reason for the failure was that the industry was not properly introduced, the transportation was inconvenient, and it was quite far away from the Taipei metropolitan area. People were not willing to relocate due to the difficulty in finding employment.

However, the subsequent opening of the Taoyuan Airport MRT Linkou metro station in 2017 and the development of Huaya Science and Technology Park in Guishan District have improved the traffic between Linkou and Taipei City and Taoyuan International Airport, respectively.

== Education ==
Linkou District has two universities, several public schools, and as of 2021 has three international schools. Since the founding of the first international school in the district, Asia American International Academy (AAIA) in 2014, and subsequent openings of Kang Chiao International School Linkou Campus in 2018 and Morrison Academy Taipei in 2020, Linkou District has seen increased growth in its English-speaking foreign population.

=== Universities and colleges ===
- Hsing Wu University
- National Taiwan Normal University – Linkou Campus

=== Local high schools ===
- New Taipei Municipal Lin-kou High School (新北市立林口高級中學)
- Hsing Wu High School (新北市私立醒吾高級中學)
- New Taipei Municipal Chong-Lin Junior High School (新北市立崇林國民中學)
- New Taipei Municipal Jia Lin Junior High School (新北市立佳林國民中學)

=== International schools ===
- Kang Chiao International School – Linkou Campus (K-12)
- Asia American International Academy (AAIA) (Grades 6-12)
- Morrison Academy Taipei (K-12)

== Tourist attractions ==
- Formosa Television Headquarters
- Zhulinshan Guanyin Temple
- WuFuYang Socks Storyland
- Guangcong Metalworking Art Museum
- Prince Creative Stationery Kingdom
- Linkou Renai Observation Deck
- Linkou Old Street
- Linkou Night Market

== Commercial areas ==
- Mitsui Outlet Park Linkou: The largest shopping mall in the Linkou area. It offers recreational international brand stores, restaurants, an arcade, and a movie theater. A major expansion to Mitsui Outlet Park, "Phase II," is planned to begin construction in 2021 and open for business in 2024 under the name of Linkou International Media Park.
- Shine Square: Another shopping mall near Mitsui Outlet Park with a movie theater, restaurants, stores, and a large arcade.

== Recreation ==
Linkou has numerous public parks, public swimming pools, hiking trails, bicycle paths, golf driving ranges, and the new Linkou Civil Sports Center (opened in 2019).

== Infrastructure ==
- Linkou Power Plant

== Transportation ==
=== Rail ===
Linkou District is served by one stop on the Taoyuan Airport MRT line, Linkou Station A9, which connects to the Taoyuan International Airport and additional Taoyuan City stops in the northwest, as well as eight stops to the southeast ending at Taipei Main Station (Taoyuan Metro). Just south of the Linkou border in Taoyuan's Guishan District, there is an additional stop at Taoyuan Airport MRT Chang Gung Memorial Hospital Station A8 which is an Express station. Many businesses around A8, although they are technically in Guishan District, instead use "Linkou" in their names (for example, Linkou Chang Gung Memorial Hospital and the Fullon Hotel Linkou).

- Linkou Station A9

=== Bus ===
Linkou is served by numerous public bus lines that connect to destinations in Taoyuan City, New Taipei City, and Taipei City. There are also commercial bus lines that provide service to cities across Taiwan.

=== Road ===
Linkou is served by the National Highway No. 1, as well as No. 15 and No. 61. County routes 105, 106 and 108 also run through the district.

== Notable natives ==
- James Soong, founder and Chairperson of People First Party
- Jay Chou, musician, singer, songwriter, record producer, film producer, actor and director
- Pai Bing-bing, singer, actress, media personality and social activist
- Wang Chien-shien, President of Control Yuan (2008–2014)

== See also ==
- New Taipei City
- Guishan District
