= Hayashi Department Store =

Department store in West Central, Tainan, Taiwan

- 林百貨
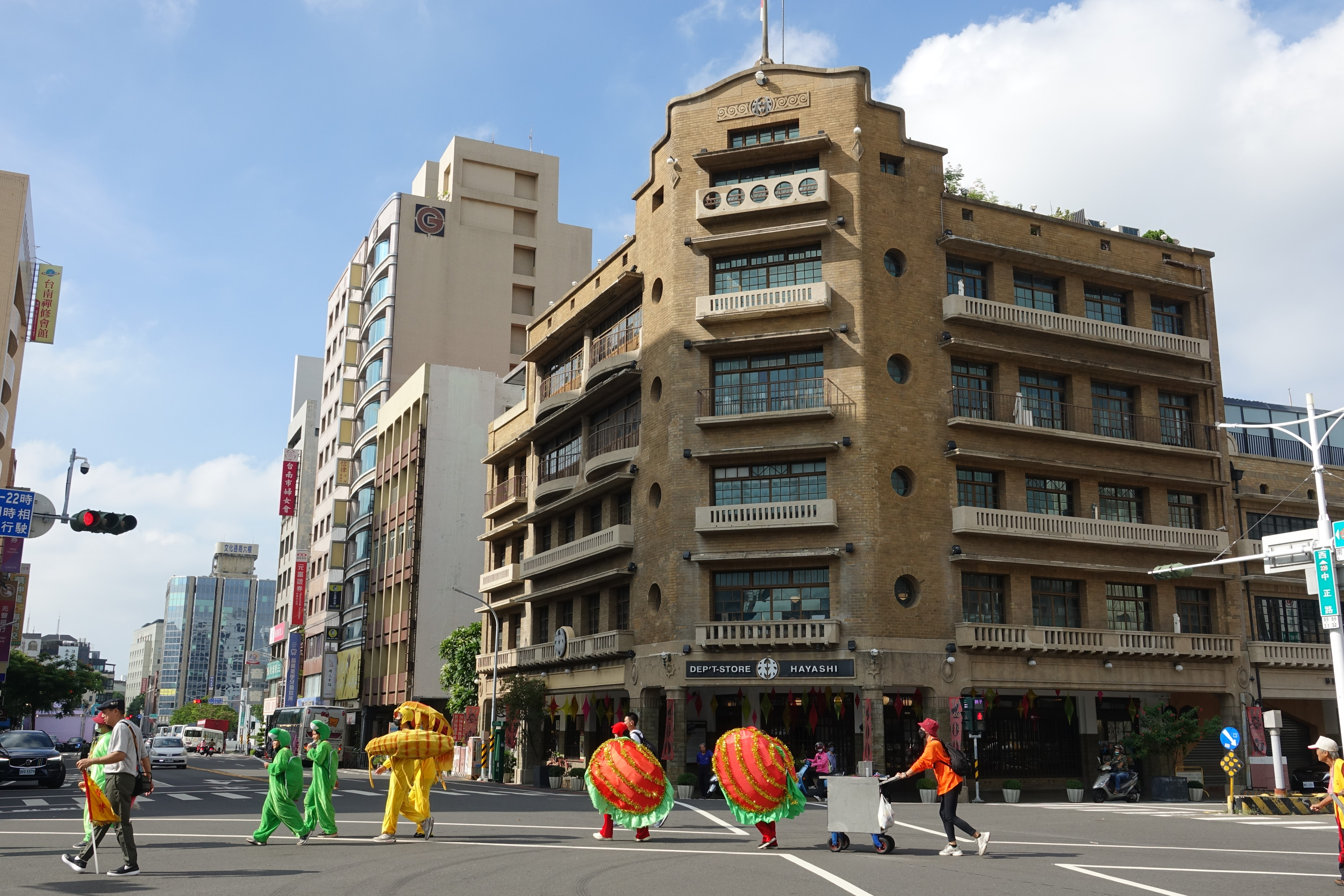
- Location: West Central, Tainan, Taiwan
- Coordinates: 22°59′30″N 120°12′08″E
- Opened: 14 June 2014
- Architect: department store
- Floors: 6
- Website: Official website

Level 1 Interior

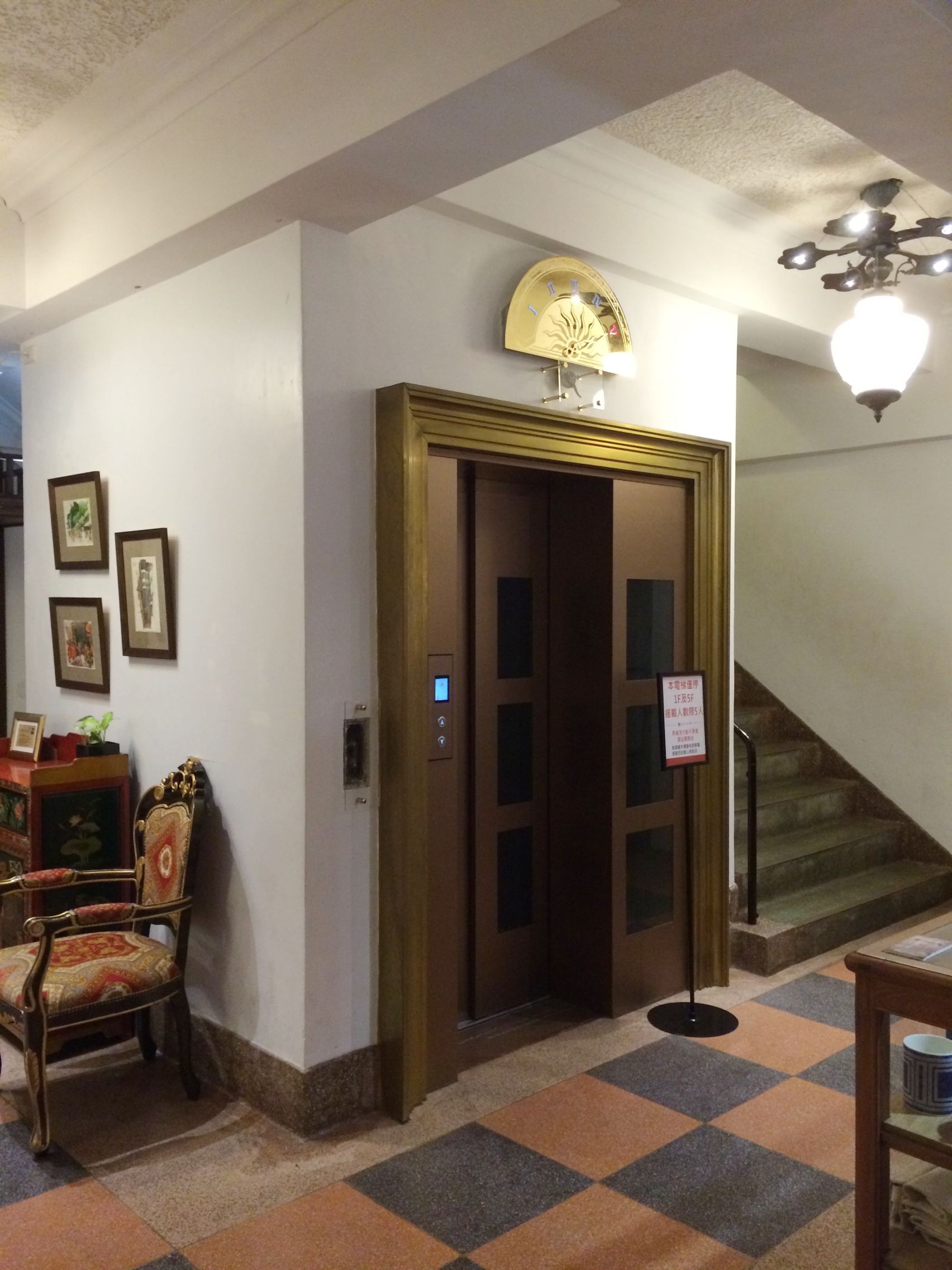
Lift inside department store

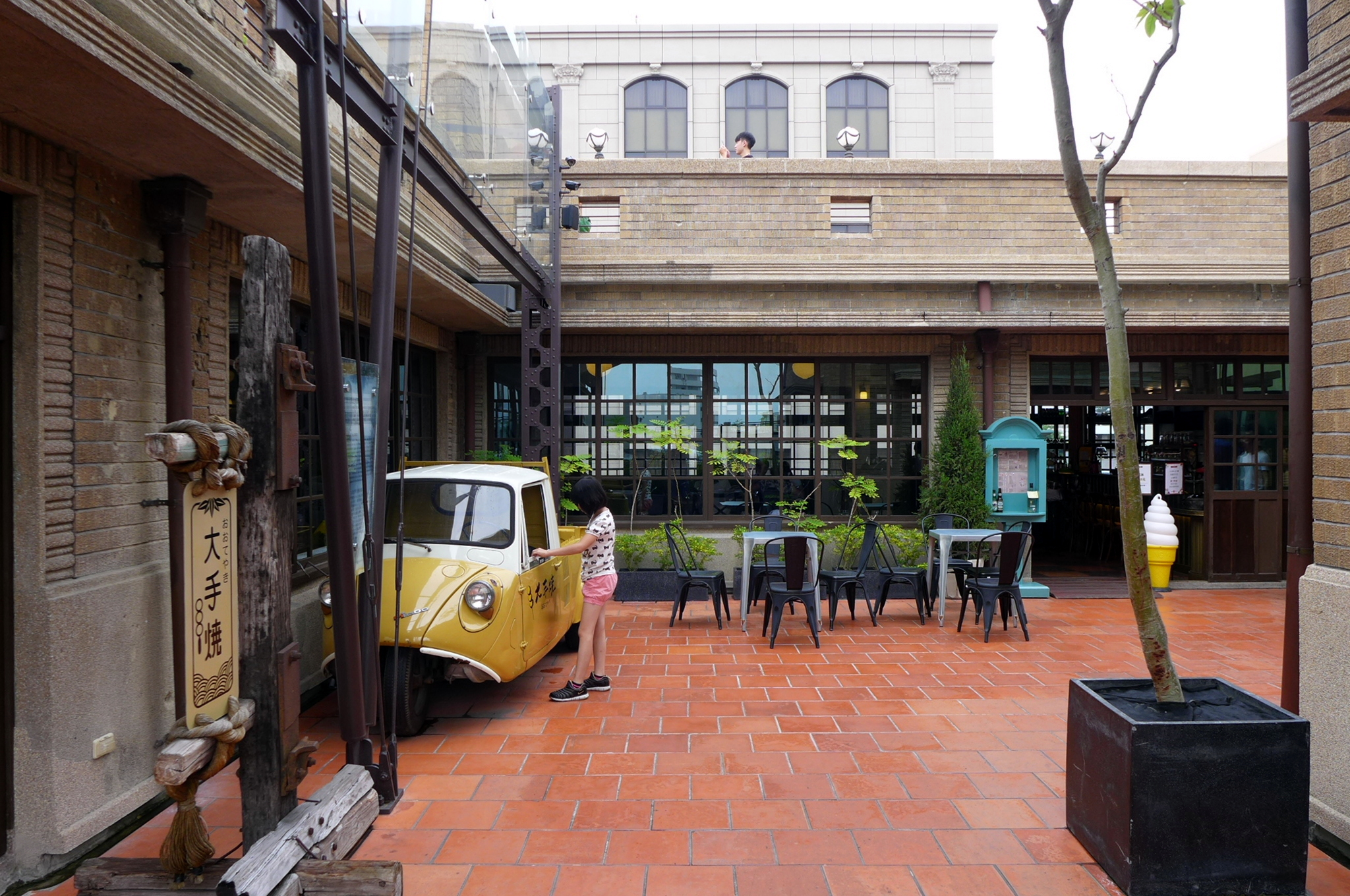
Level 5 Podium and shops

The Hayashi Department Store (traditional Chinese: 林百貨; simplified Chinese: 林百货; pinyin: Línbǎihuò) is a department store in West Central District, Tainan, Taiwan.

== History ==
Hayashi Department Store (Japanese: ハヤシ百貨店, Hepburn: Hayashi Hyakkaten), commonly called "Five-story Building" (Chinese: 五層樓仔; Pe̍h-ōe-jī: Gō͘-chàn-lâu-á), was situated in Suehirochō (末廣町), Tainan City, Tainan Prefecture, Japanese Taiwan. It was originally completed and opened on 5 December 1932, during Japanese rule. Upon completion, the building was one of two such stores in Taiwan with state-of-the-art features of elevators. The building was bombed by the United States airplanes at the end of World War II. After refurbishment, the building began to be restored in 2006. It was finally reopened on 14 June 2014 in a ceremony presided by Tainan Mayor William Lai.

== Architecture ==
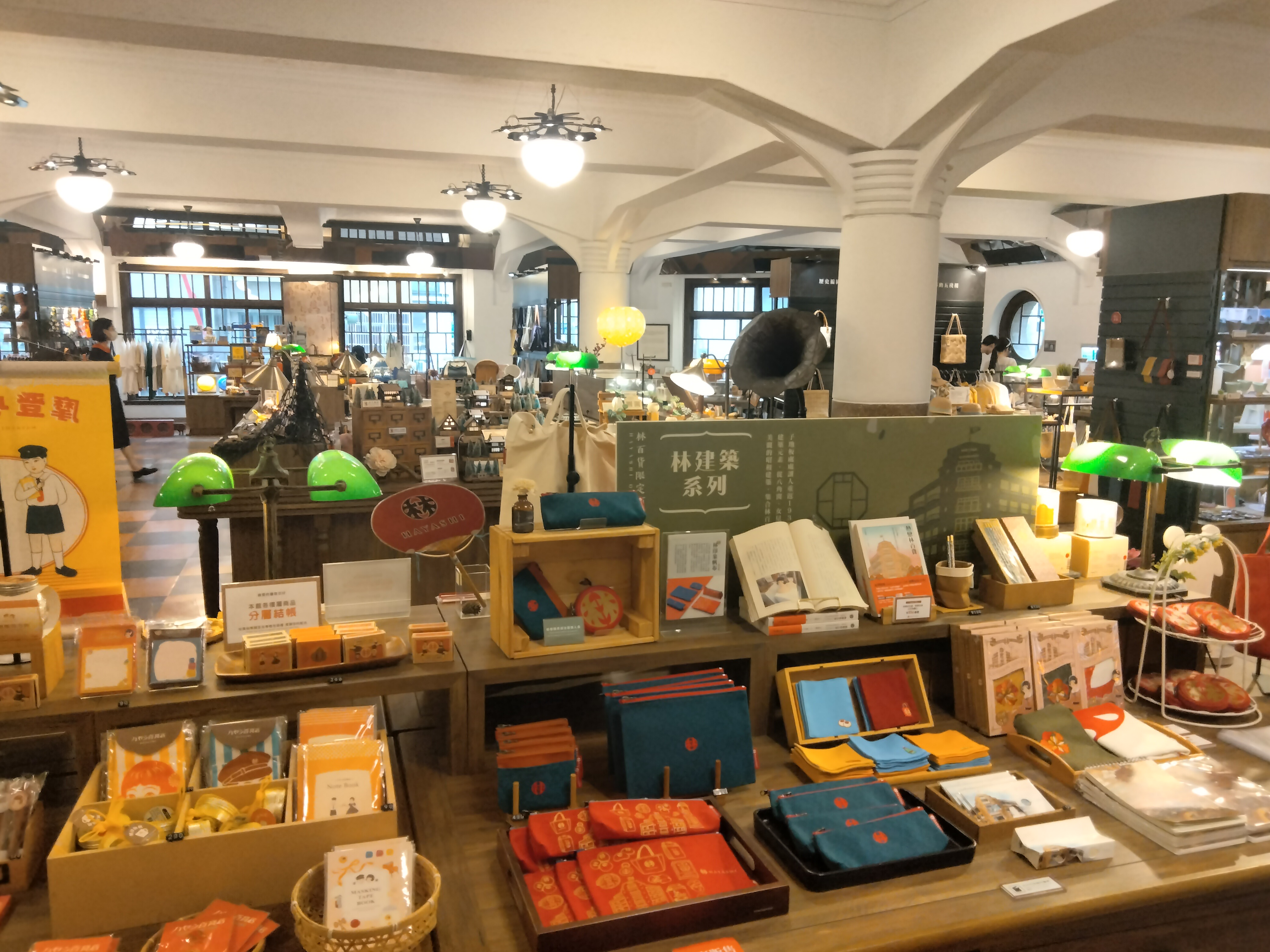
Level 2 Interior

The department store is a five-story building. It features exhibitions on local farming culture and handicraft on the top floor. There is also Western-style cafeterias and an observation deck.

== Transportation ==
The department store is accessible within walking distance south west of Tainan Station of Taiwan Railway.

== See also ==
- List of tourist attractions in Taiwan
- Kikumoto Department Store: the first department store in Taipei, two days before Hayashi Department Store.
- Yoshii Department Store: the third department store in Kaoshiung. Demolished in 1994.
