= Shine Square =

Shopping mall in Linkou, New Taipei, Taiwan

- 昕境廣場

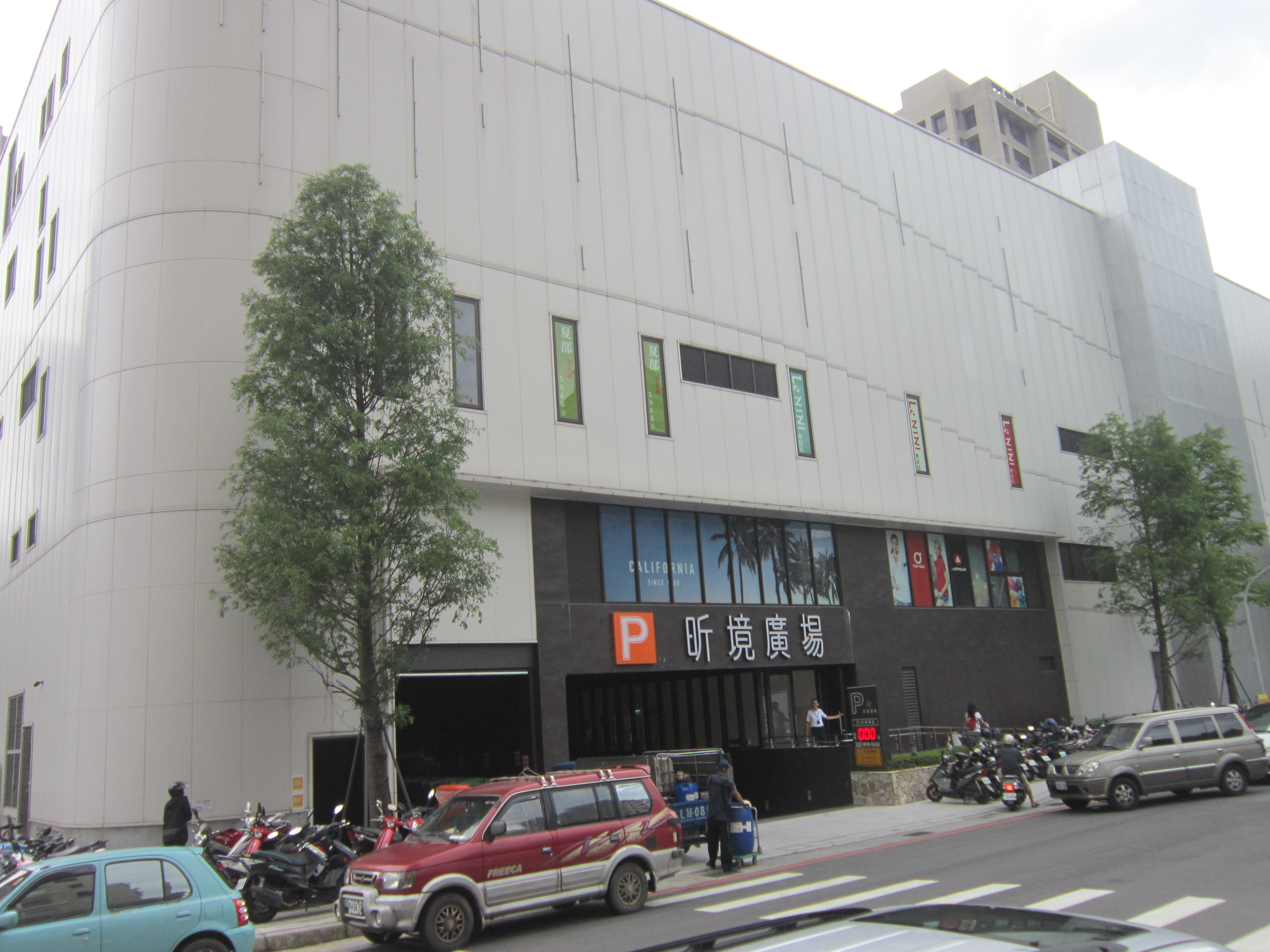
- Location: No. 2, Lane 402, Section 1, Wenhuasan Road, Linkou District, New Taipei, Taiwan
- Coordinates: 25.073604208250046°N 121.36885906730856°E
- Opened: July 18, 2015
- Floor area: 110,000 m^{2} (1,200,000 sq ft)
- Floors: 6 floors above ground 5 floors below ground
- Parking: 117
- Website: http://www.shine-square.com.tw/

Shine Square (Chinese: 昕境廣場; pinyin: Xīnjìng guǎngchǎng) is a shopping center in Linkou District, New Taipei, Taiwan, that opened on July 18, 2015. The total floor area is about 71,395 m^{2} (768,490 sq ft), ranging from level six above ground to level B5. The main core stores of the mall include Adidas, The North Face, Ambassador Theatres and various themed restaurants.

== Floor Guide ==
Level 6	Themed restaurants
Levels 4 & 5	Ambassador Theatre
Level 3	Food court and restaurants
Level 2	Sports
Level 1	Leisure, Massey's Coffee Shop
B1	Car Park

== Gallery ==
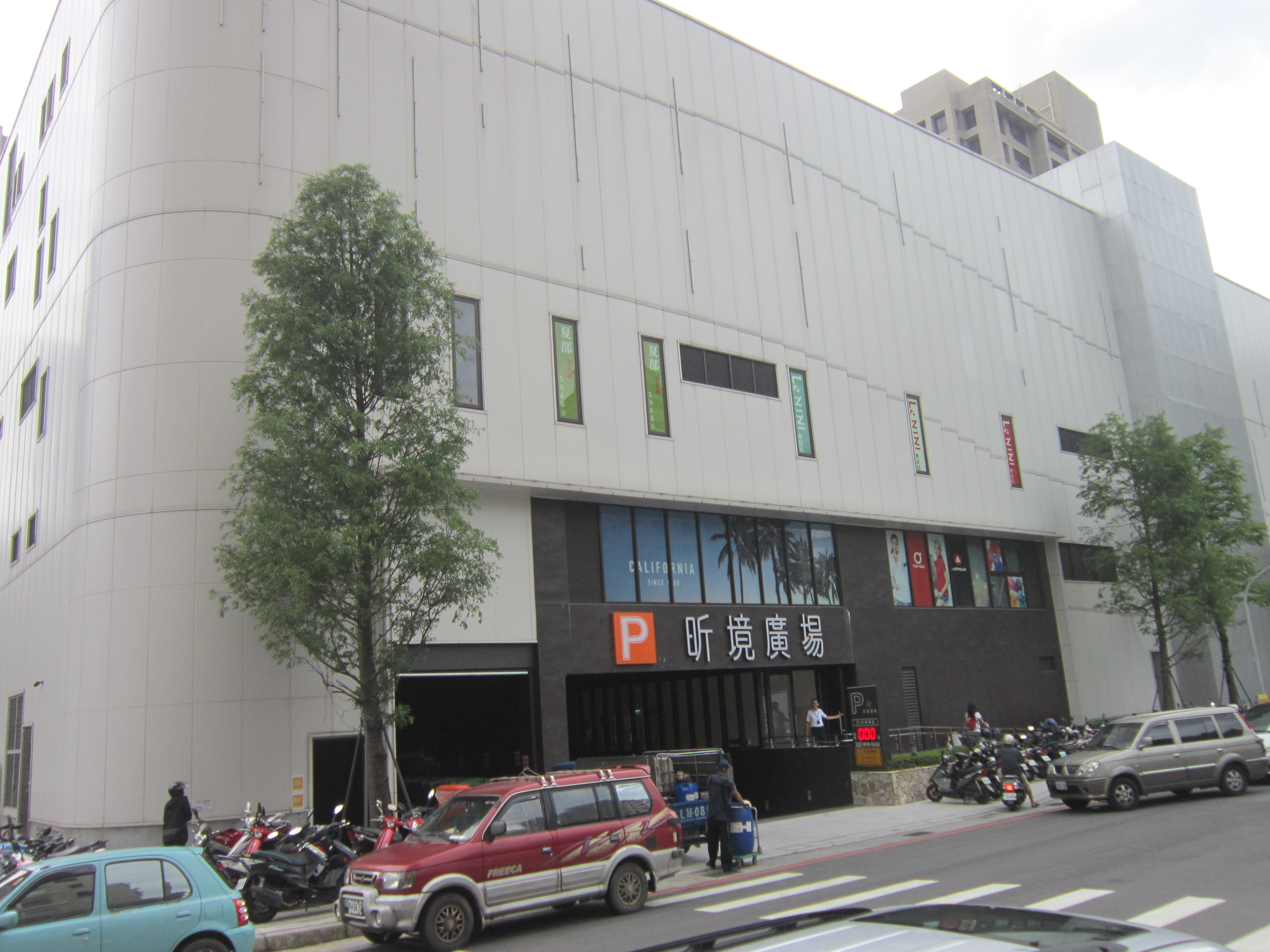
Exterior

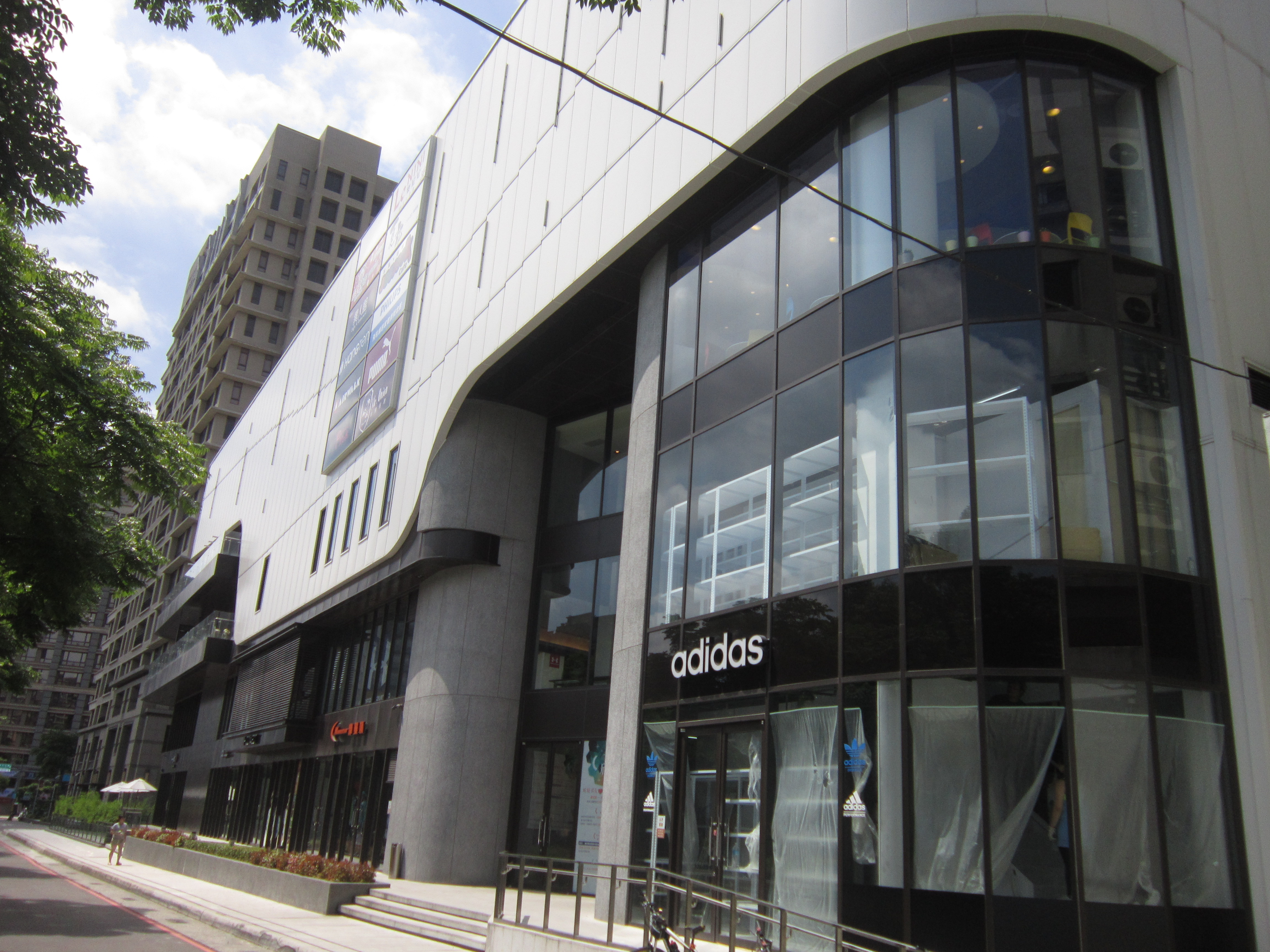
Exterior

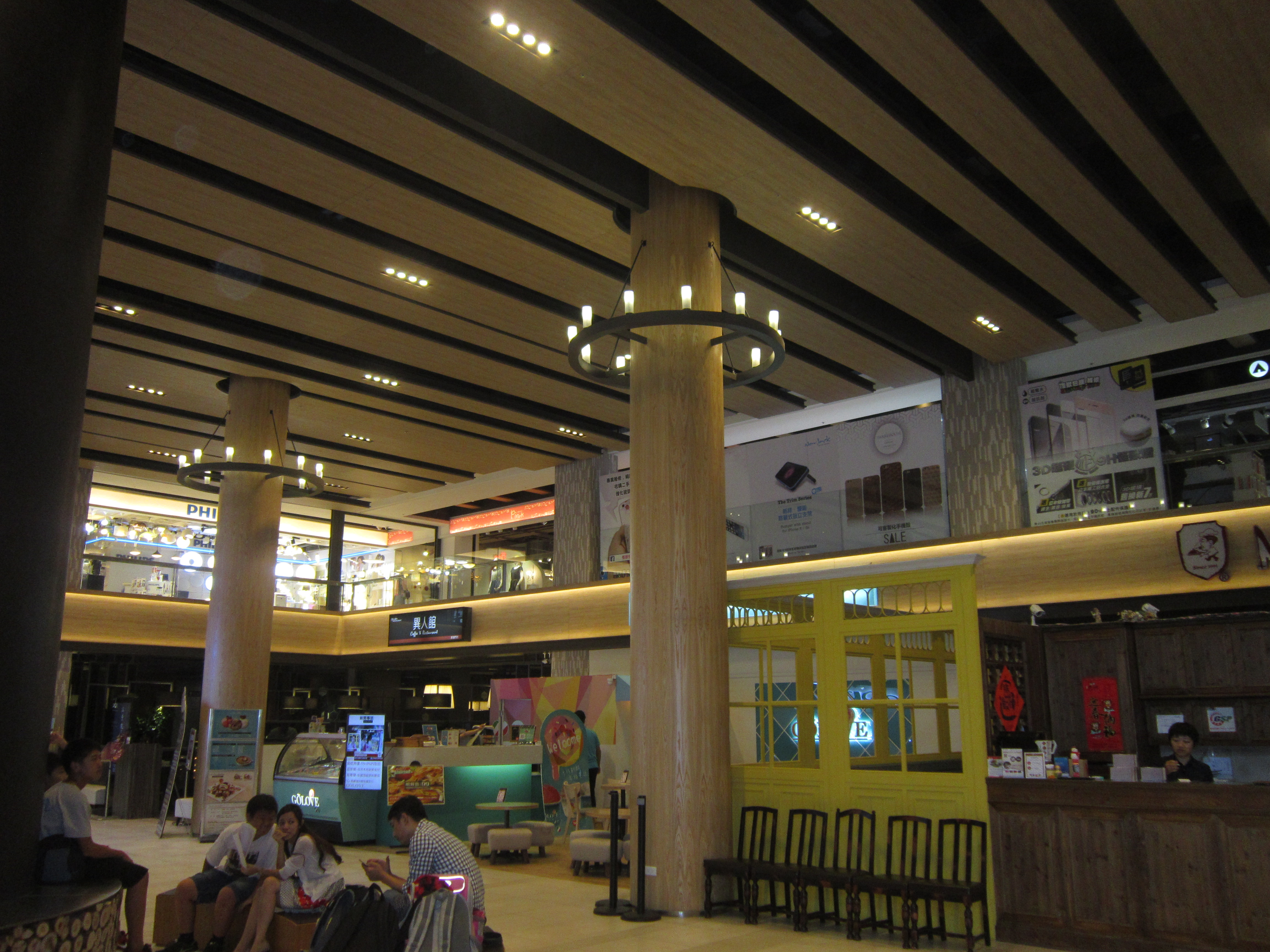
Interior

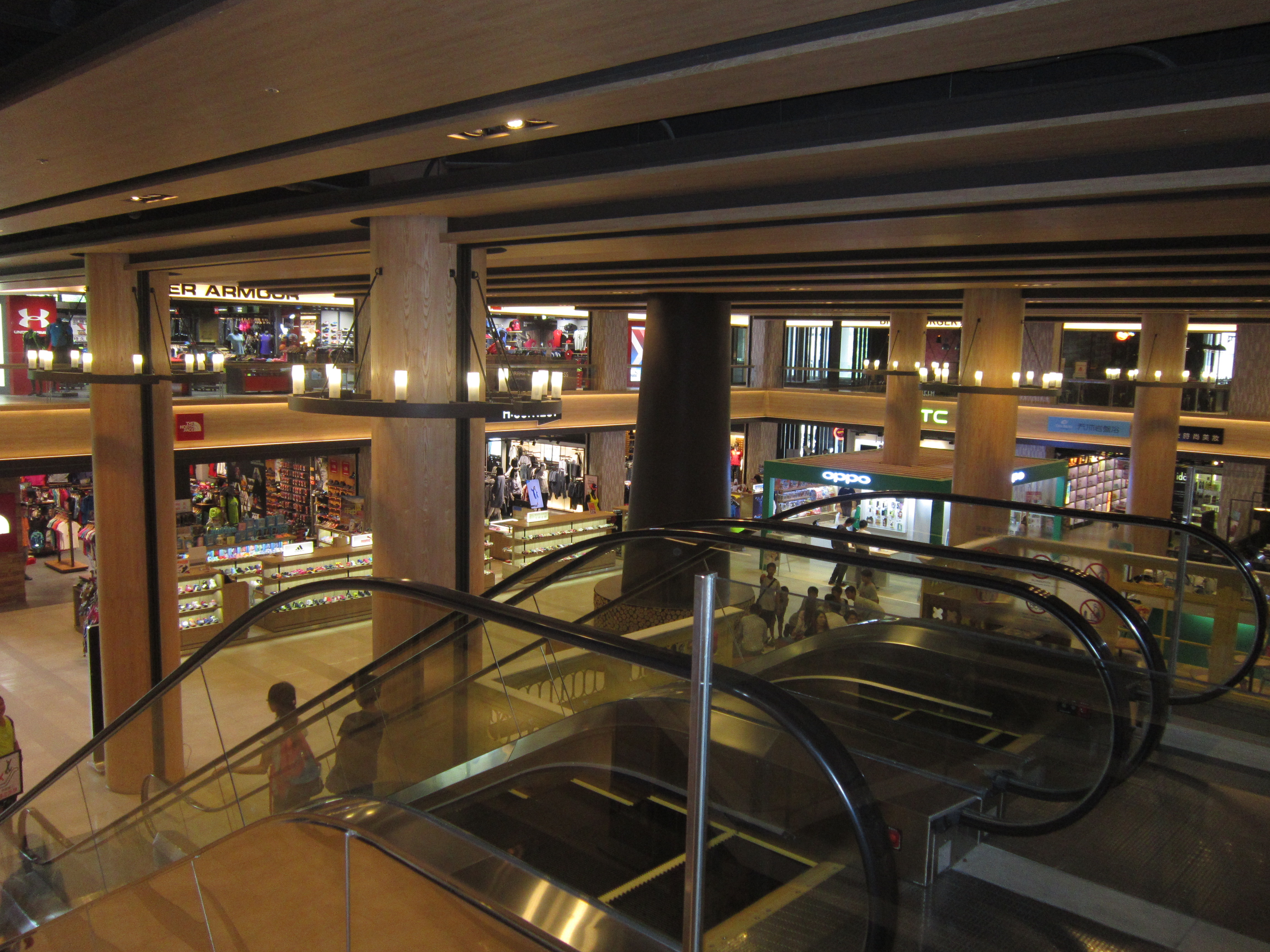
Interior

== See also ==
- List of tourist attractions in Taiwan
- Mitsui Outlet Park Linkou
