= Landmark Life Plaza =

Shopping mall in Bade, Taoyuan, Taiwan

- 置地生活廣場
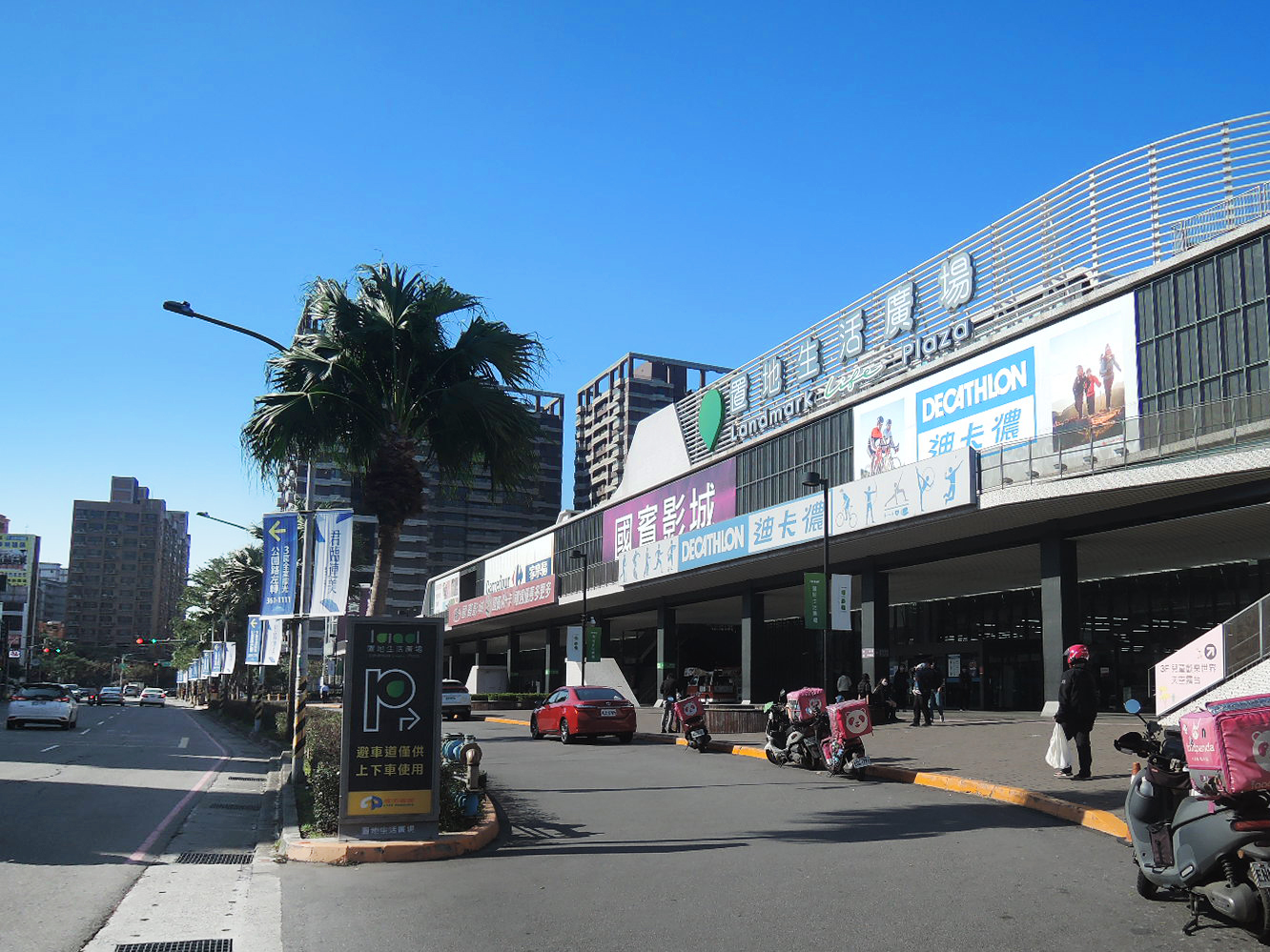
- Location: No. 728, Section 1, Jieshou Road, Bade District, Taoyuan, Taiwan
- Coordinates: 24°57′55″N 121°17′56″E
- Opened: January 12, 2017
- Developer: Cathay Life Insurance
- Manager: Cathay Life Insurance
- Floor area: 107,527 m^{2} (1,157,410 sq ft) (including parking spaces)
- Floors: 6 floors above ground 4 floor below ground
- Parking: 1120 parking spaces
- Website: https://landmarklife-plaza.com.tw/

Landmark Life Plaza (Chinese: 置地生活廣場) is a shopping mall in Bade District, Taoyuan, Taiwan that opened on January 12, 2017 as Kwong Fong Plaza (廣豐新天地). The total floor area of the mall interior is about 107,527 m^{2} (1,157,410 sq ft), including parking spaces.

== History ==
- The shopping mall obtained a construction license in the second semester of 2013.
- Construction began in 2014 and completed in 2016.
- It opened for trial operation on December 22 of 2016.
- The mall officially opened on January 12, 2017.
- In November 2021, the mall changed its name to Landmark Life Plaza after being bought by Cathay Life Insurance.

== Floor Guide ==
- Level 3: Themed shops
- Level 2: Parking spaces
- Level 1: Kwong Fong Avenue
- Level B1: Parking spaces
- Level B2: Carrefour store
- Levels B3 & B4: Parking spaces

== Gallery ==
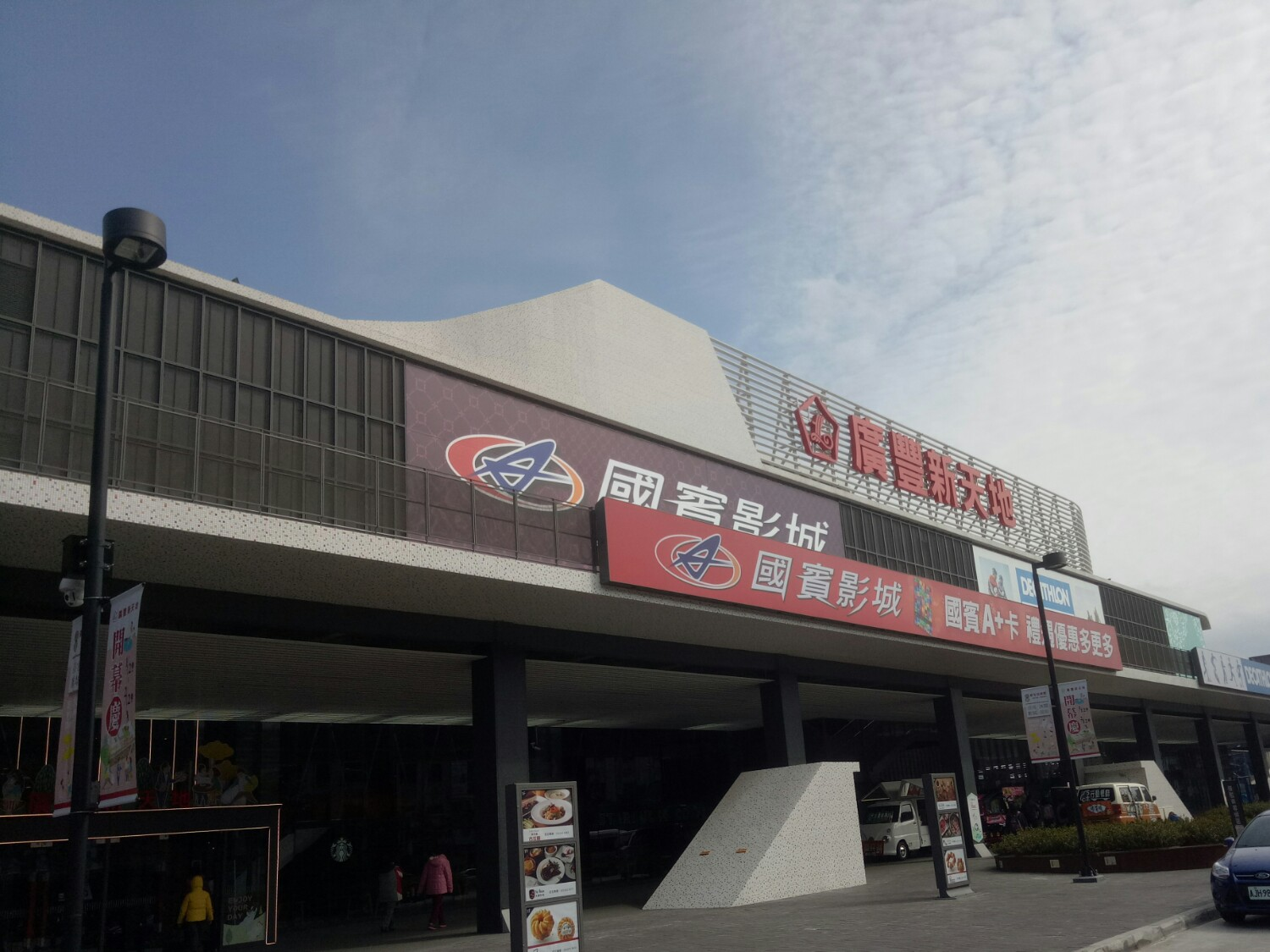
Exterior view in 2017 before name change

Old logo

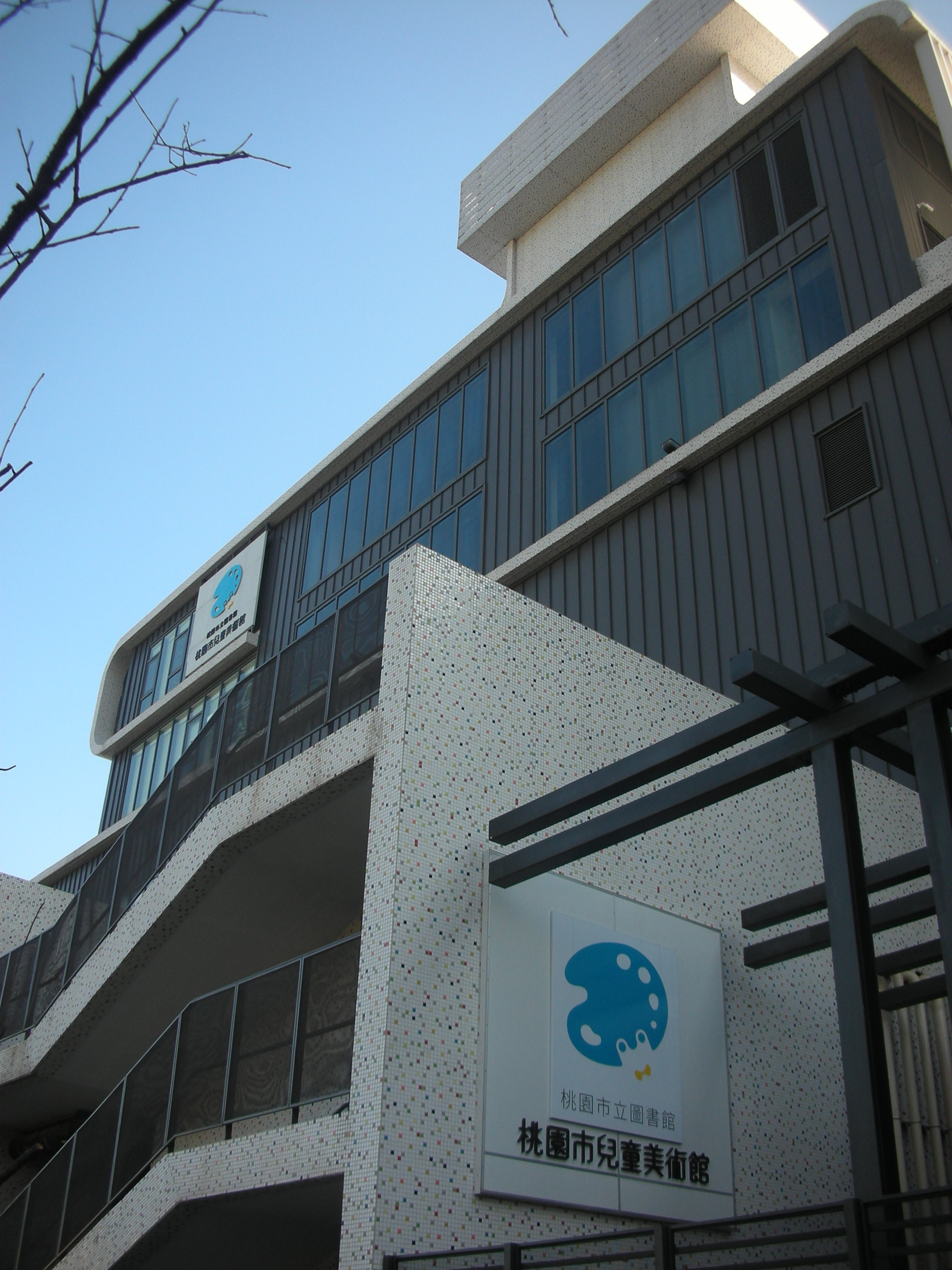
Former location of the Children's Art Museum, Taoyuan

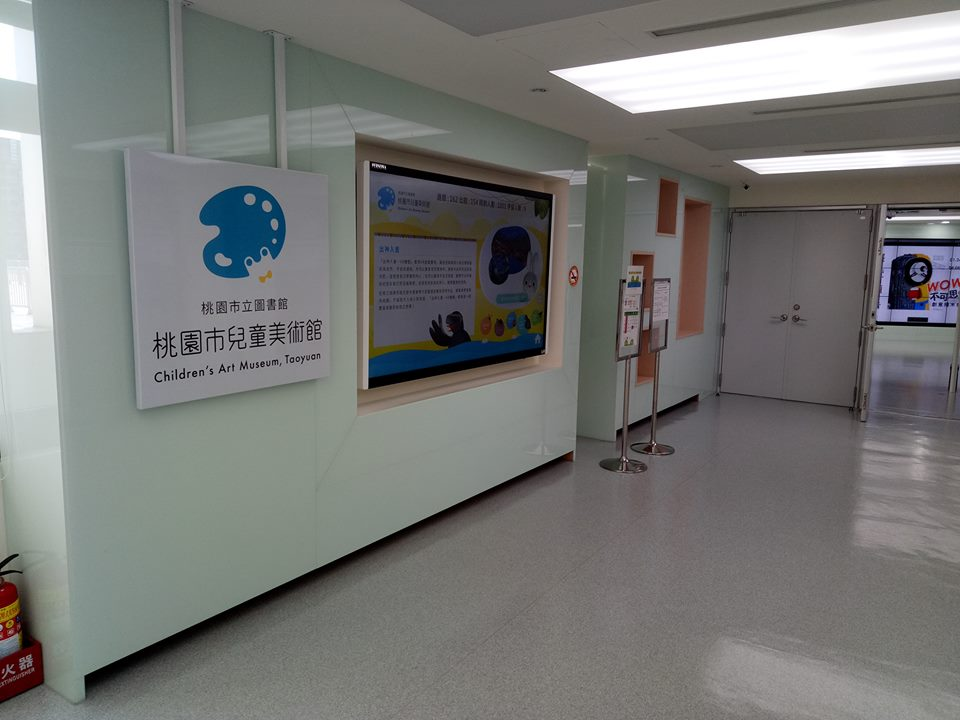
Former entrance of Children's Art Museum, Taoyuan

== See also ==
- List of tourist attractions in Taiwan
