= Landmark Plaza =

Landmark Plaza may refer to:

- Landmark Plaza, a tall building in Chengdu, China
- Landmark Plaza, two tall buildings in Guangzhou, China
- Landmark Plaza, Yokohama Landmark Tower, Japan
- Landmark Plaza, site of Putrajaya Landmark, Malaysia
- Landmark Plaza Taoyuan, a shopping mall in Zhongli District, Taoyuan, Taiwan
- Landmark Plaza Taichung, a tall building in Taichung, Taiwan
- Landmark Plaza, site of Hot Springs Confederate Monument, Arkansas, United States
- Landmark Plaza, adjacent to Landmark hotel and casino in Las Vegas, United States

== See also ==
- Landmark Life Plaza, a shopping mall in Bade District, Taoyuan, Taiwan
