= Tonlin Plaza =

- 統領廣場

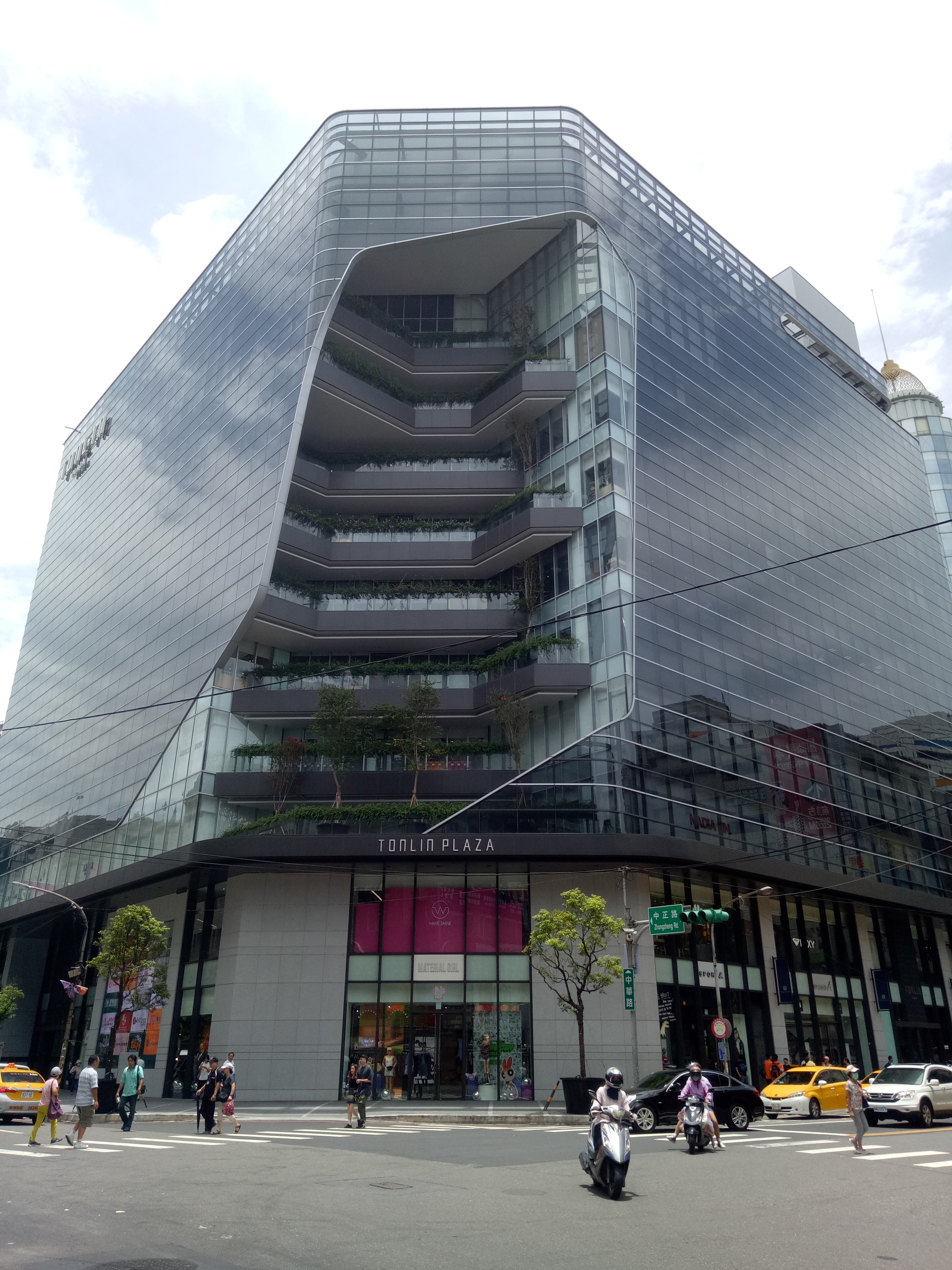
- Location: No. 61, Zhongzheng Road, Taoyuan District, Taoyuan, Taiwan
- Coordinates: 24.991185821965047°N 121.3126632552285°E
- Opened: 1995
- Manager: Tonlin Department Store Co., Ltd.
- Floor area: 40,000 m^{2} (430,000 sq ft)
- Floors: 12 floors above ground 4 floors below ground
- Website: www.tonlin.com.tw

The Tonlin Plaza (Chinese: 統領廣場; pinyin: Tǒnglǐng guǎngchǎng) is a shopping center in Taoyuan District, Taoyuan, Taiwan that opened in 1995.

== History ==
- In 1982, Tonlin Department Store Co., Ltd. was established.
- In 1984, Tonlin Department Store opened in Taipei.
- In 1994, The company's shares were publicly traded and became a listed company.
- In 1995, Tonlin Department Store opened its Taoyuan Branch.
- In 1999, Taipei store closed.
- On February 6, 2017, the Taoyuan store of Tonlin Department Store was temporarily closed, and the entire building underwent renovation and refurbishment.
- On September 15, 2018, Tonlin Department Store's Taoyuan store was renamed 'Tonlin Plaza and started trial operation. It officially opened on October 3 of the same year.

== Facilities ==
The total floor area of the building is about 40,000 m^{2} (430,000 sq ft) (including parking space). It is in close proximity to Taoyuan railway station. Since there are still two other department stores in the area, the Far Eastern Department Store Taoyuan Store and the Shin Kong Mitsukoshi Taoyuan Station Store in front of the other two department stores, the competition in the same industry is fierce. Thus, in February 2017, NT$1 billion was spent in order to renovate the building to become the only green building mall in Taoyuan City with the exterior design following the Japanese Omotesandō-style. In October 2018, Tonlin Department Store Taoyuan reopened under the name Tonlin Plaza, increasing the proportion of the catering industry to 40%, and introducing large-scale specialty stores such as a cinema (In89 Cinemax) and bookstores, and also reserved an area of 200 m^{2} (2,200 sq ft) for holding art exhibitions.

== Gallery ==
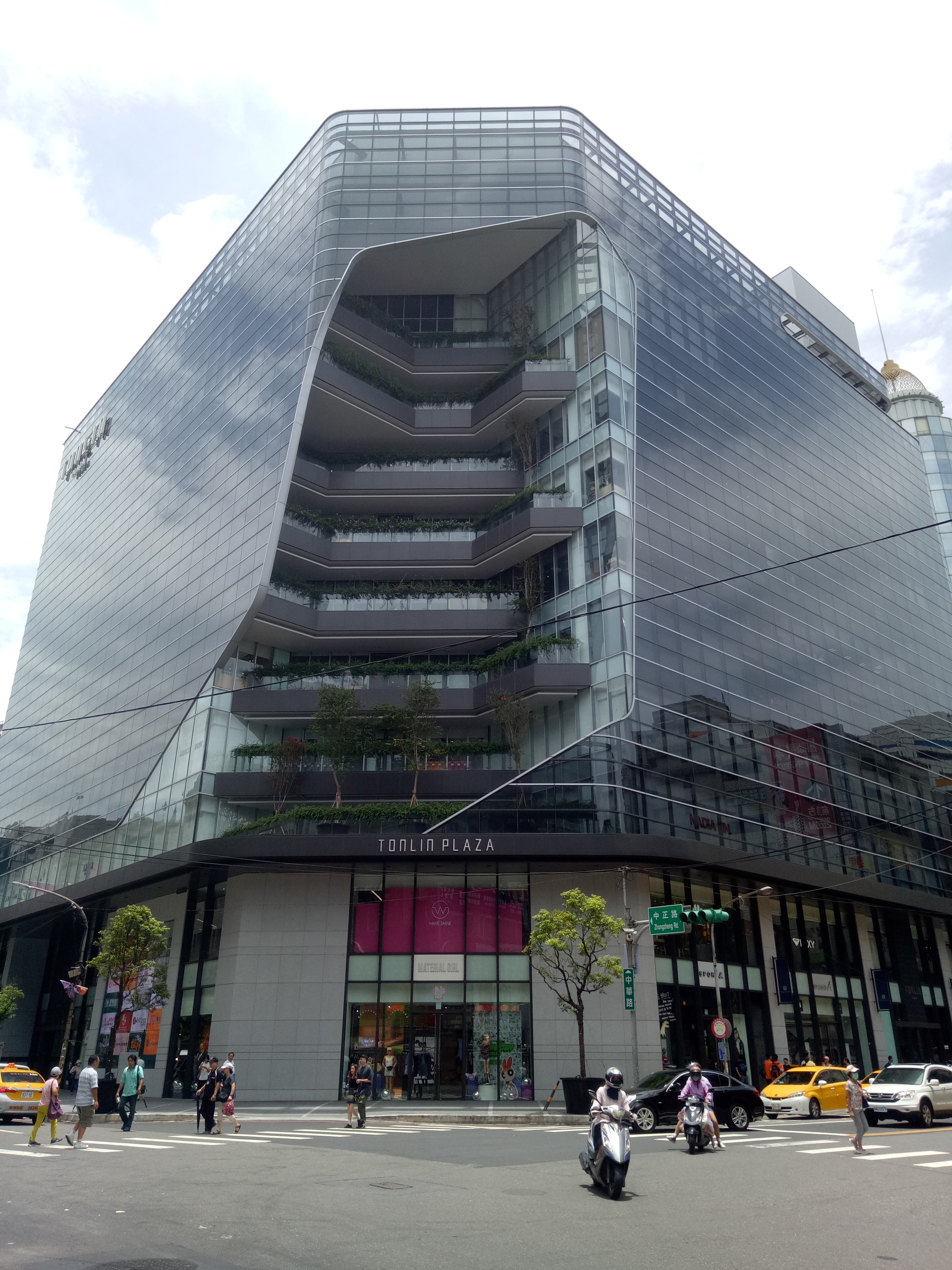
Refurbished Exterior

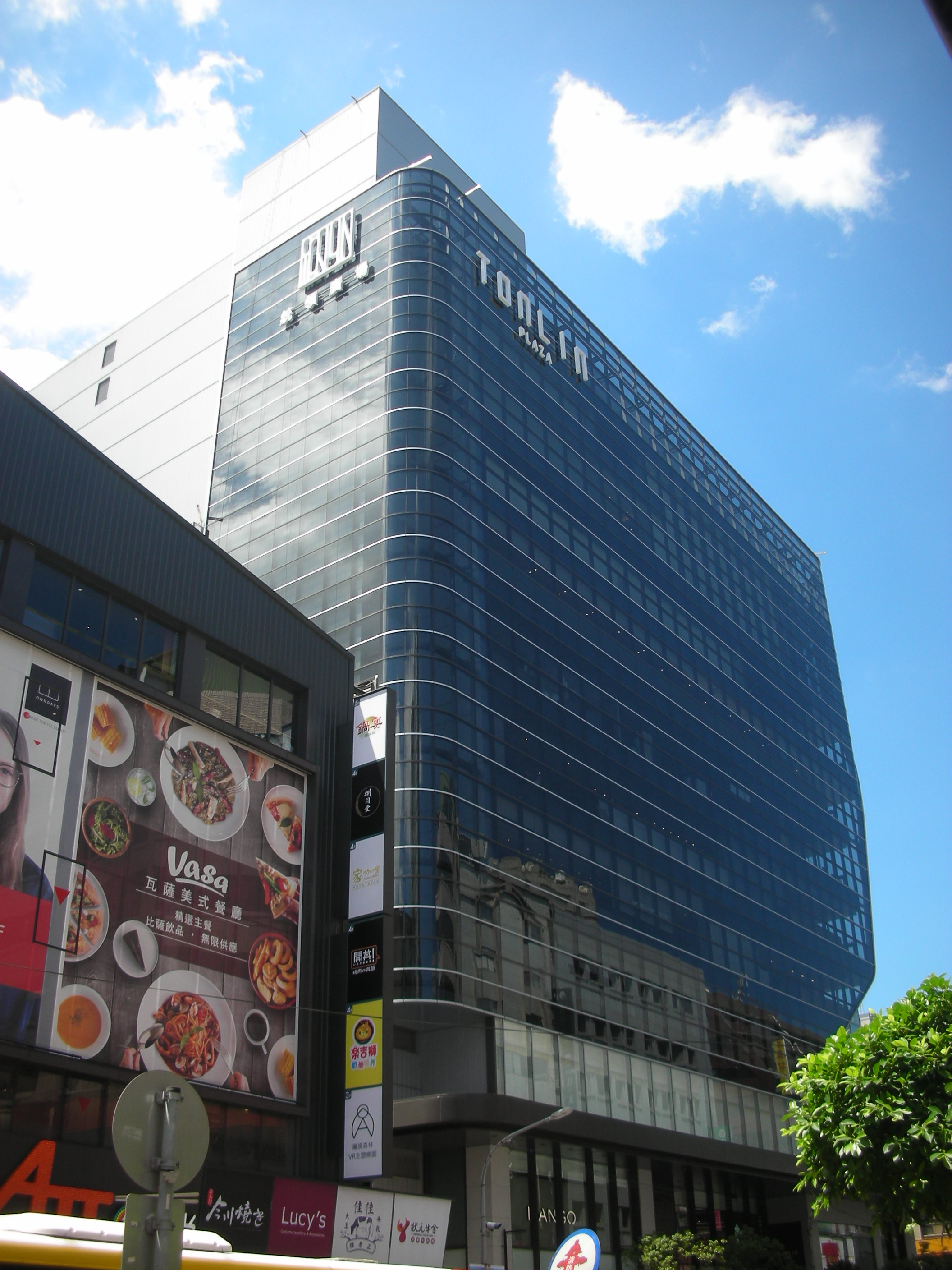
Exterior front of the Tonlin Plaza

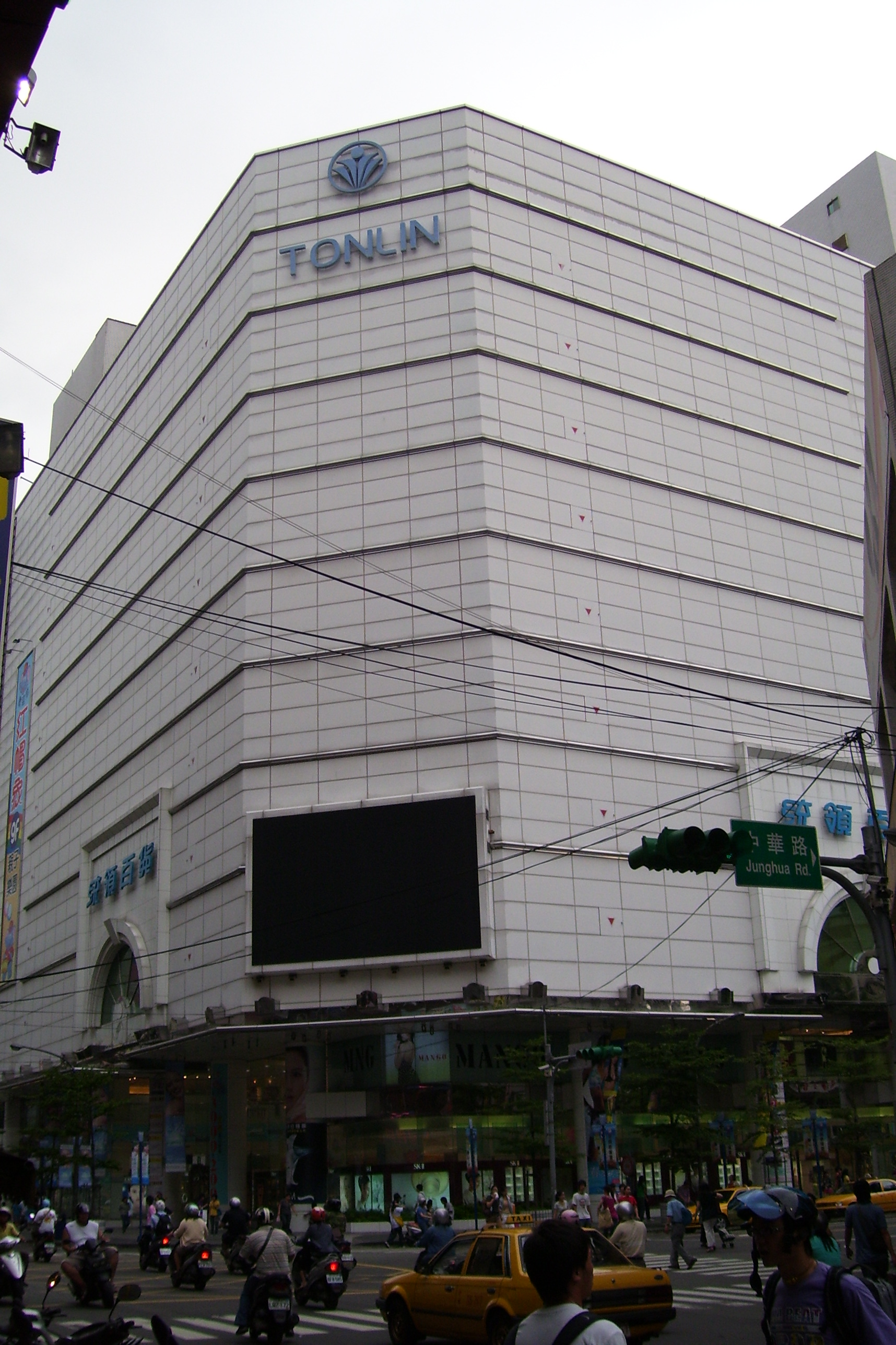
Pre-refurbishment

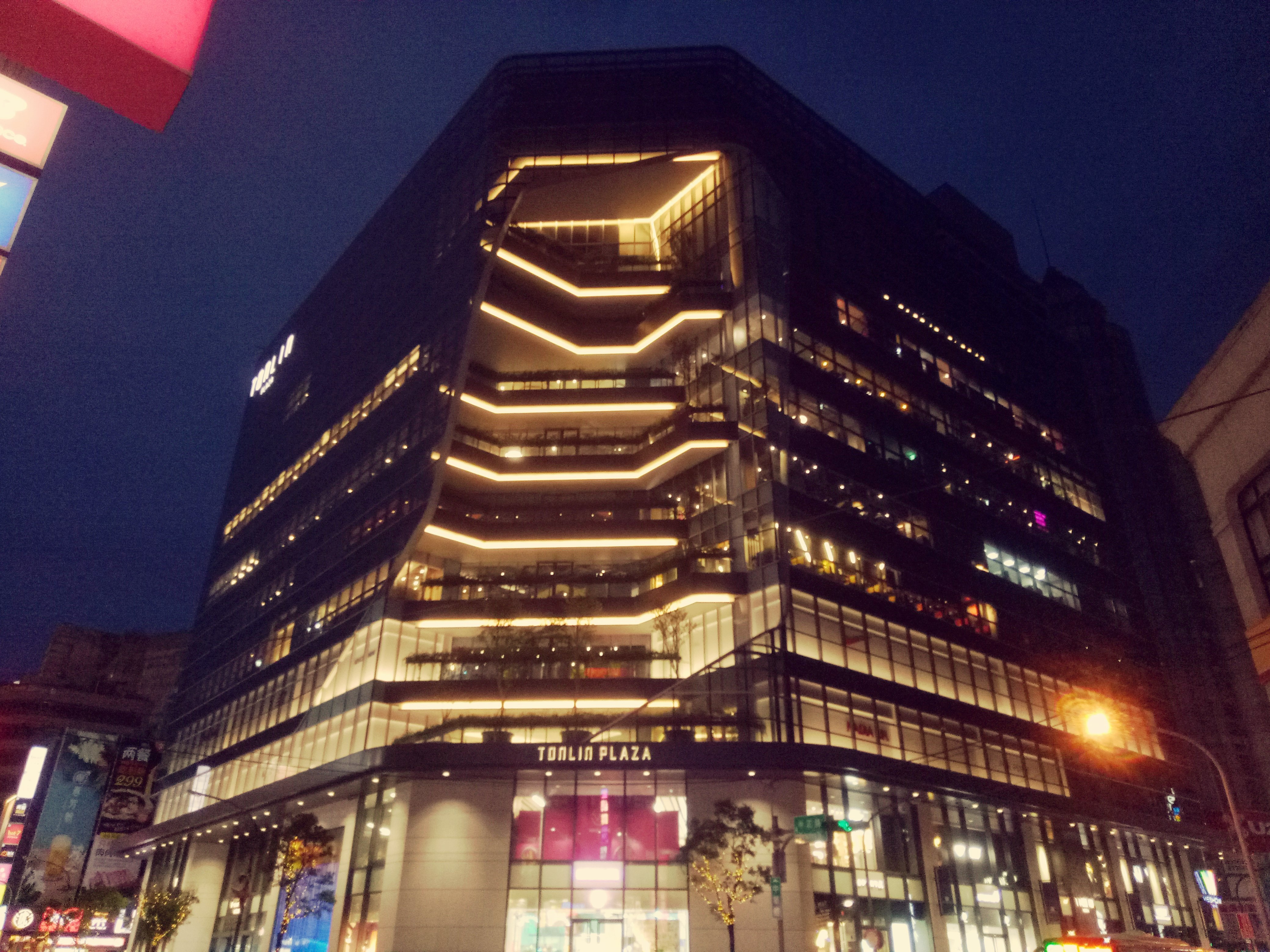
At night

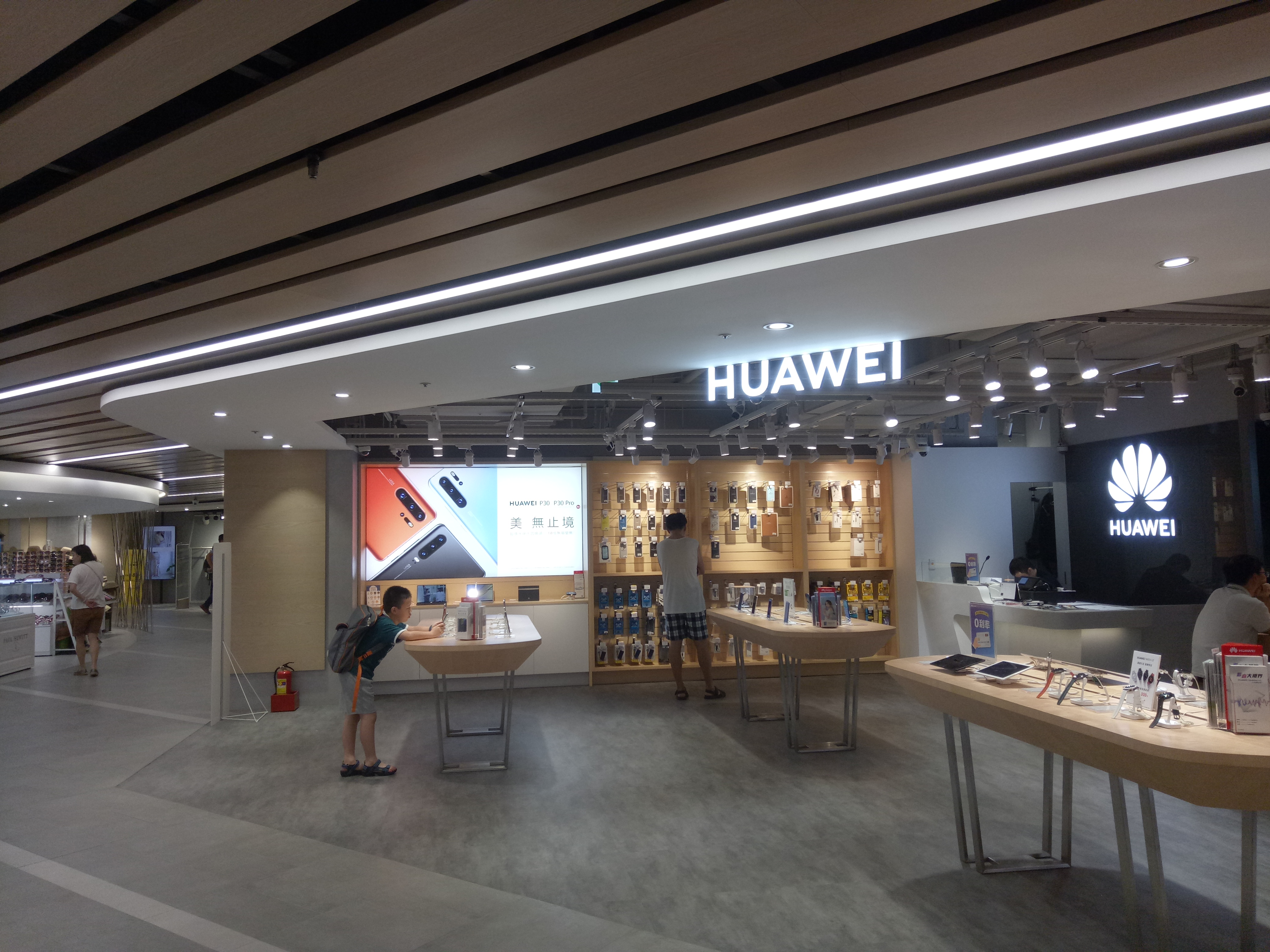
Interior

== See also ==
- List of tourist attractions in Taiwan
- TaiMall Shopping Center
- MetroWalk Shopping Center
