= Metro Walk (disambiguation) =

Metro Walk is a transit oriented development in Downtown Richmond, California.

Metro Walk may also refer to:

- Metro Walk (Delhi), a mall and amusement park in India
- Metrowalk, a business district in the Philippines
- MetroWalk Shopping Center, in Taoyuan, Taiwan
