= Pier 3 =

Shopping mall in Magong, Penghu, Taiwan

- 澎坊三號港購物廣場

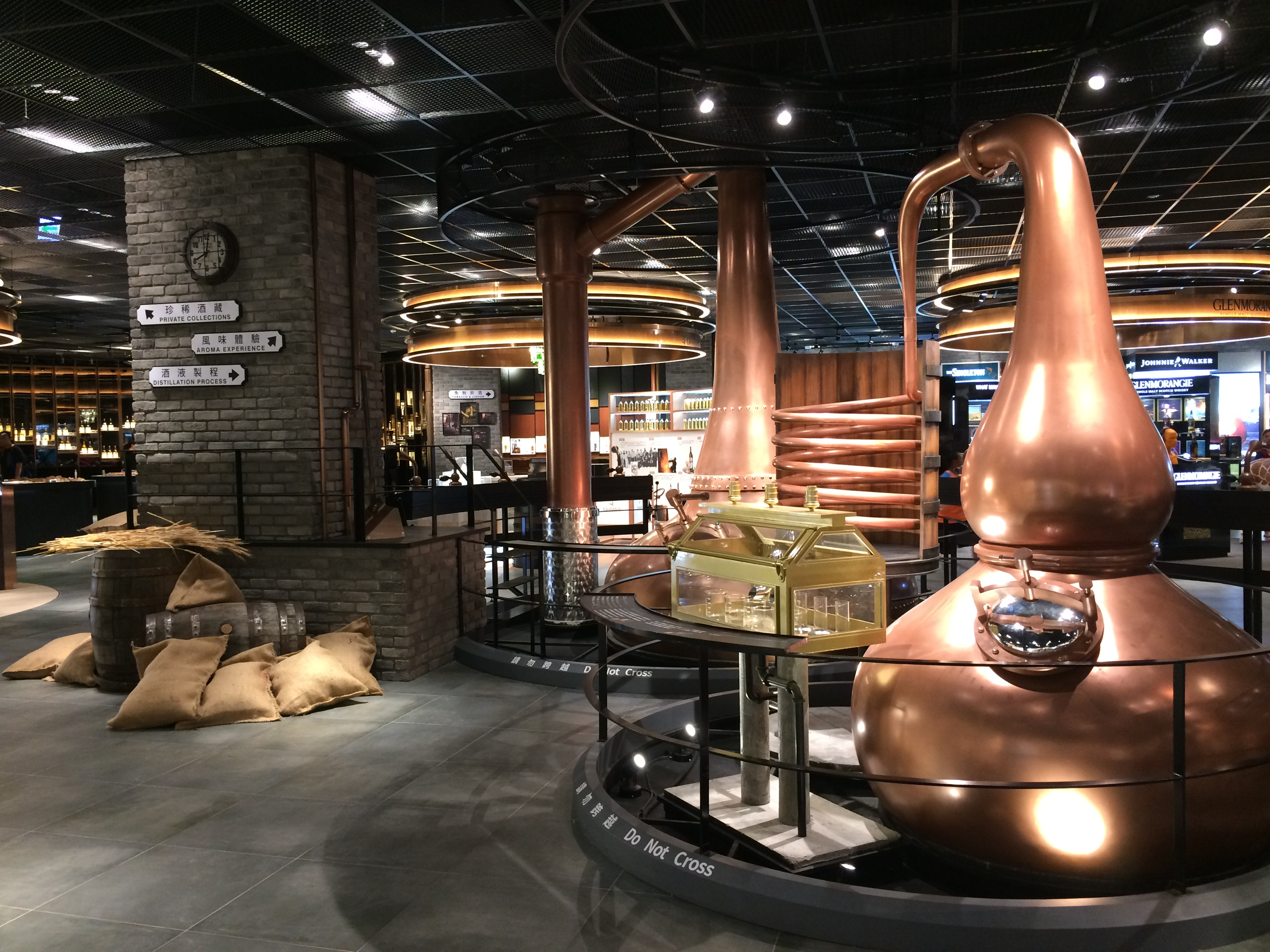
- Location: No. 158, Tonghe Road, Magong City, Penghu County, Taiwan
- Coordinates: 23.568165062633906°N 119.5723129263651°E
- Opened: 2018
- Developer: Ever Rich Duty Free
- Floors: 4 above ground 1 below ground
- Public transit: Penghu Airport
- Website: https://www.profond.com.tw/en/pier3

Pier 3 (Chinese: 澎坊三號港購物廣場) is a shopping center in Magong City, Penghu County, Taiwan that opened in 2018. Developed by Ever Rich Duty Free, it is the largest shopping mall and duty-free shop in the county. The mall is located in close proximity to Penghu Airport.

== Facilities ==
In addition to the international boutiques, perfume and cosmetics and other duty-free shops and brands, the mall houses the largest indoor non-mechanical power recreational stadium Star Quest GO STAR Challenge in Taiwan. The Whiskey 101 Experience Showroom in the mall is the first international whisky experience hall in Taiwan, which presents the whisky production process and its history. There is also a food court in the mall that houses various themed restaurants.

== Gallery ==
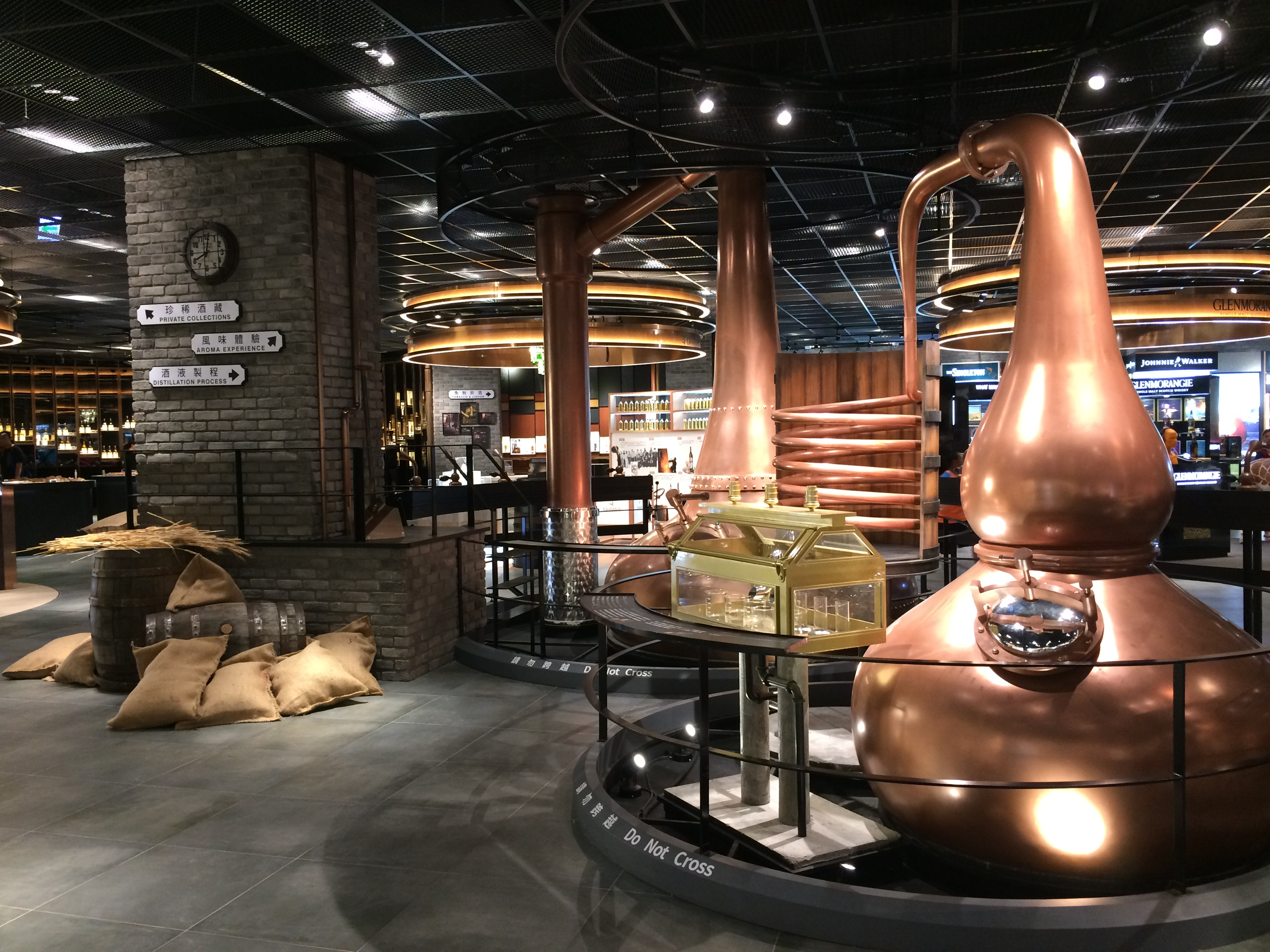
Whiskey 101

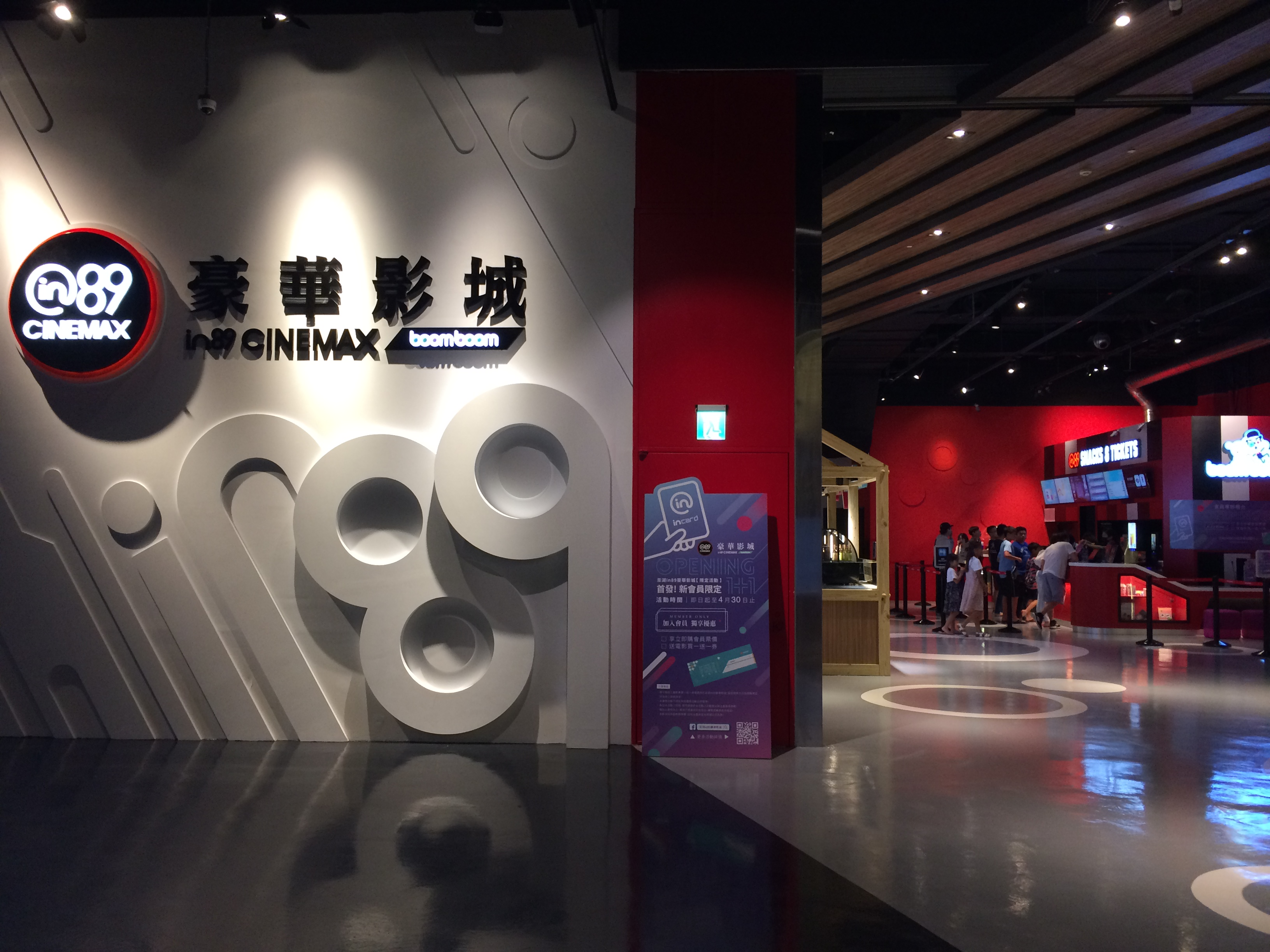
In89 Cinemax Entrance

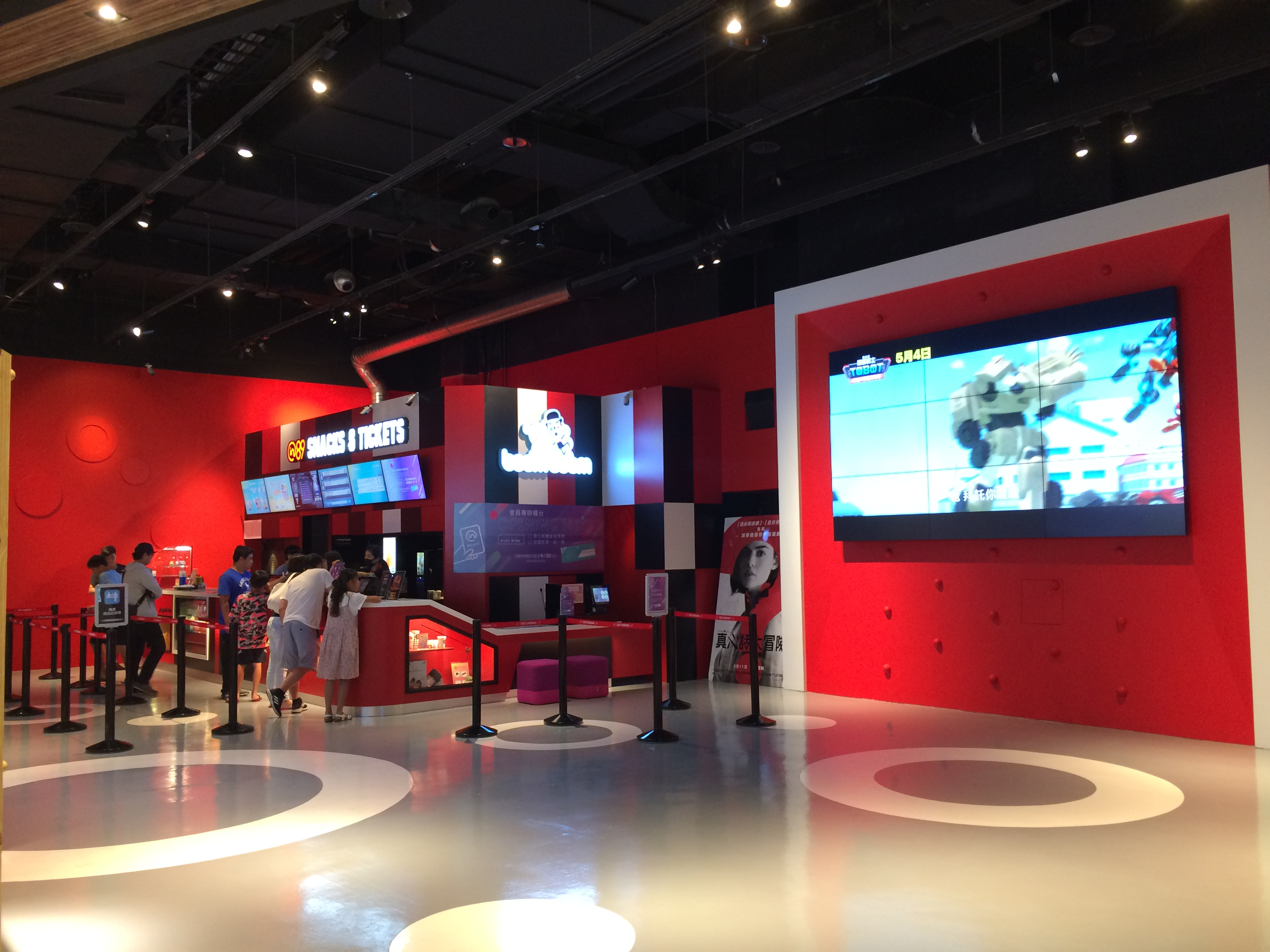
In89 Cinemax Interior

== See also ==
- List of tourist attractions in Taiwan
