= In89 Cinemax =

Taiwanese cinema chain

in89 Cinemax
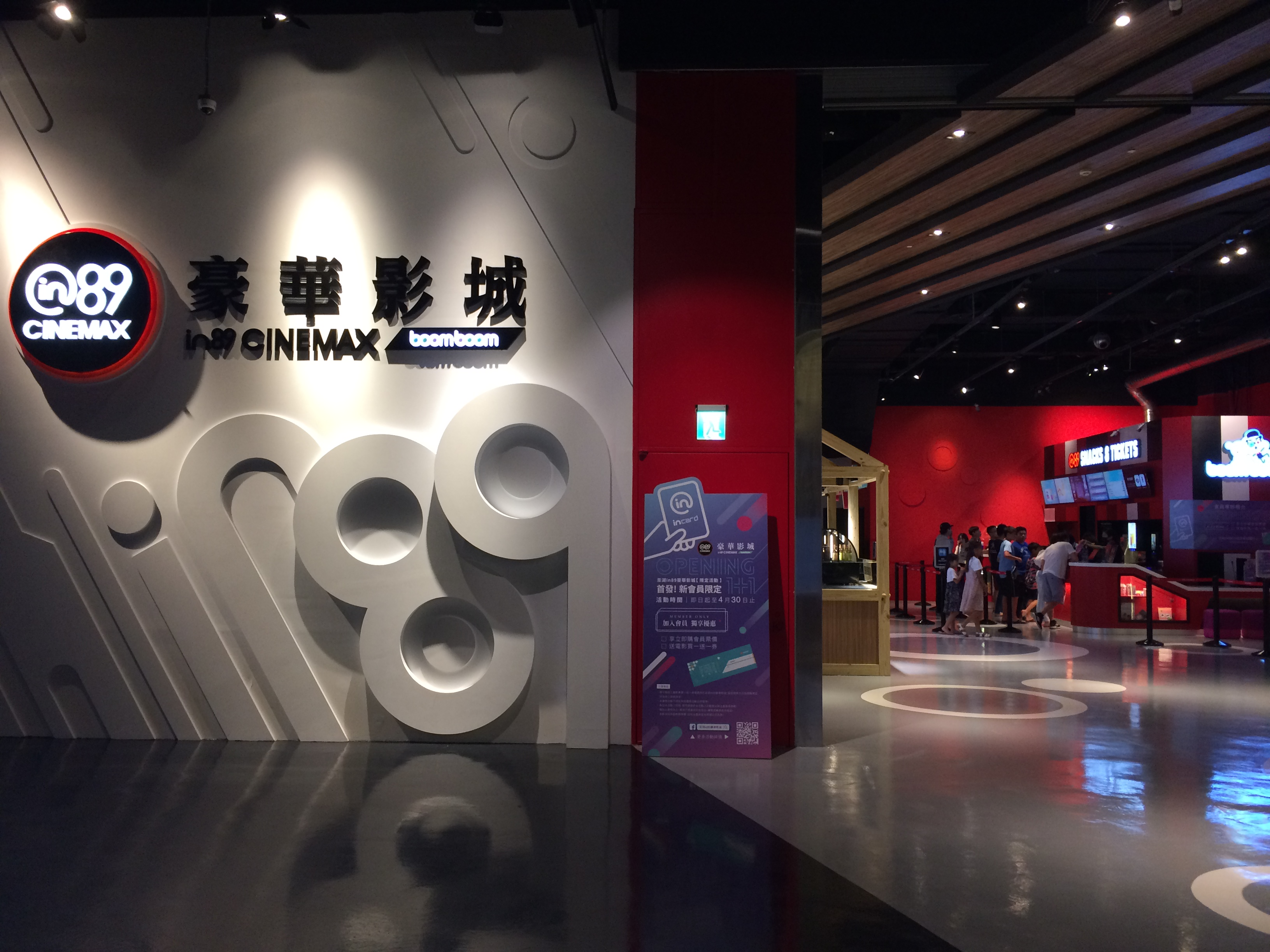
- Company type: Private company
- Industry: media, entertainment
- Founded: May 1964
- Headquarters: 89, Section 2, Wuchang Street, Wanhua District, Taipei, Taiwan
- Number of locations: 7
- Area served: Taiwan
- Website: www.in89cinemax.com

in89 Cinemax (Chinese: in89豪華影城; pinyin: in89 Háohúa Yǐngchéng) is a Taiwanese cinema chain that opened in 1964 under the name Luxury Theatre (豪華大戲院). It changed to its current name in 2005. As of June 2024, it has 7 cinemas and 63 screens across Taiwan.

== Business Operations ==
=== Cinemas ===
| Cinema | Screens/Halls | Seats | City | Opening Year |
| in89 Cinemax Taipei Ximen | 9 | 1193 | Taipei | 1964 |
| in89 Cinemax Taoyuan Tonlin | 8 | 448 | Taoyuan | 2017 |
| in89 Cinemax Taichung Fengyuan | 12 | 532 | Taichung | 2018 |
| in89 Cinemax Chiayi InSquare | 9 | 1178 | Chiayi | 2021 |
| in89 Cinemax Kaohsiung Pier 2 | 7 | 491 | Kaohsiung | 2016 |
| in89 Cinemax Kaohsiung Talee | 11 | 471 | Kaohsiung | 2019 |
| in89 Cinemax Penghu Everrich | 7 | 566 | Magong | 2018 |

== See also ==
- List of cinemas in Taiwan
- Ambassador Theatres
- Century Asia Cinemas
- Miranew Cinemas
- Shin Kong Cinemas
- Showtime Cinemas
- Vieshow Cinemas
