= TaiMall =

Shopping mall in Luzhu, Taoyuan, Taiwan

- 台茂購物中心

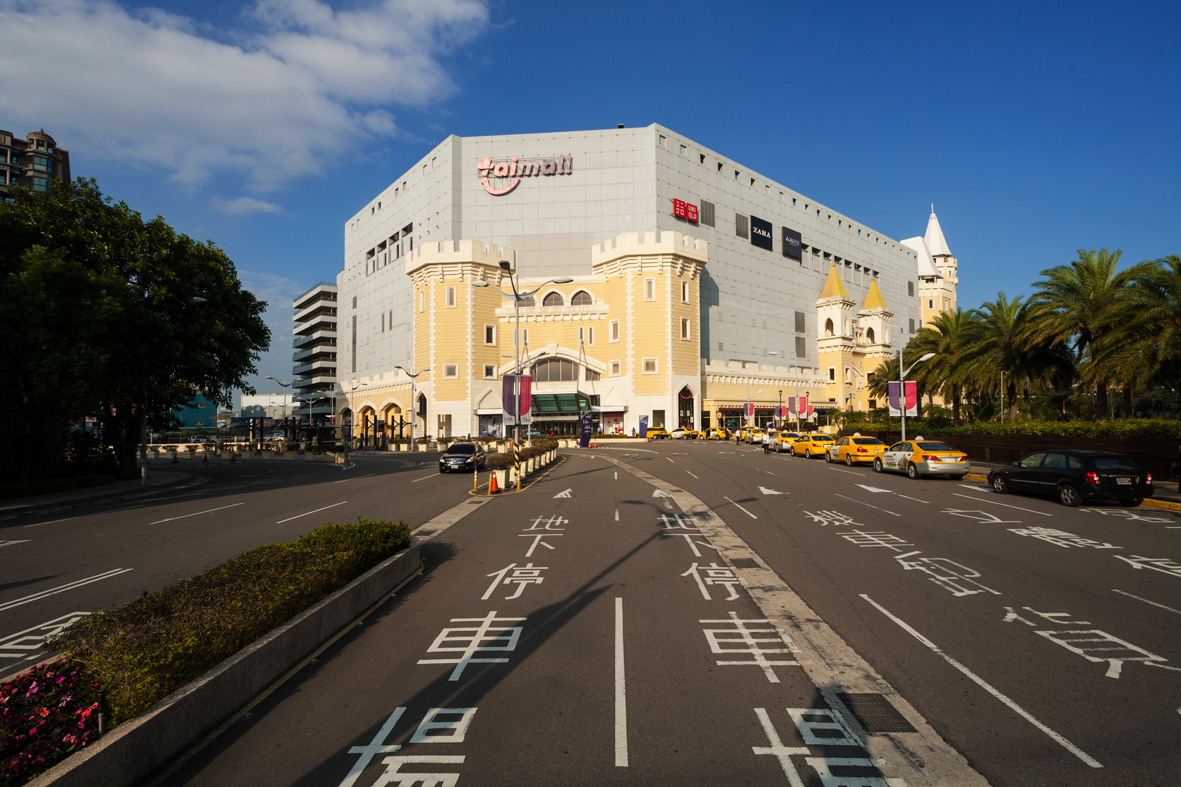
- Location: No. 112, Section 1, Nankan Road, Luzhu District, Taoyuan, Taiwan
- Coordinates: 25°03′13″N 121°17′18″E
- Opened: July 4, 1999
- Manager: TaiMall Development Co., Ltd
- Floor area: 75,545 m^{2} (813,160 sq ft)
- Floors: 7 floors above ground 3 floors below ground
- Parking: 2600 parking spaces
- Website: www.taimall.com.tw

TaiMall (Chinese: 台茂購物中心; pinyin: Tái mào gòuwù zhòng xīn) is a shopping mall in Luzhu District, Taoyuan, Taiwan that opened on July 4, 1999. It is the first American-style shopping mall in Taiwan.

== History ==
- In August 1994, TaiMall Development Co., Ltd. cooperated with the land policy of the industrial and commercial complex promoted by the government and filed an application for the development of the Nankan industrial and commercial complex into a shopping center. It took three years to obtain the development permit and complete the land change. With a two-year construction period with a total expenditure of NT$7.4 billion, the TaiMall Nankan Family Entertainment Shopping Center officially opened on July 4, 1999.
- In October 2008, GIC (Singaporean sovereign wealth fund), the original shareholder of TaiMall Development, established a Singapore-based company New TaiMall Global Co., Ltd. in Taiwan. The operation management and planning of the shopping center is managed by the TaiMall Shopping Center Management Consulting Co., Ltd. under the Singaporean multinational company "Keppel Corporation".
- On December 18, 2010, after a two-year and two-stage major renovation, it was refurbished and opened with "New TaiMall Getting Better".
- From July to October 2014, with the theme of TaiMall's "Belle Era: A New Departure", it spent NT$300 million on refitting, and the refurbishment opened in December.
- In 2015, the performance reached a record high, becoming the number one department store in Taoyuan City.
- In 2016, the second basement floor was remodeled, and about 1,300 m^{2} (14,000 sq ft) of area were remodeled and adjusted, and the sports venues were adjusted into retail clothing and exquisite lifestyle stores. The re-planned stylish commercial space is spacious and comfortable, presenting a simple Loft fashion light industrial style. The original sports venue is integrated with the outdoor green space plan, and it is converted to an open recreational space that combines multiple functions such as sports, entertainment, and leisure.
- In 2017, the annual performance was NT$6 billion, ranking No. 1 in Taoyuan City Department Store for three consecutive years; it won the fourth place in the category of service industry-department shopping center in CommonWealth Magazine in 2017.

== Facilities ==
TaiMall Shopping Center covers an indoor area of 50,000 m^{2} (540,000 sq ft), with retail accounting for 43% of the total area, leisure and entertainment for 40%, catering for 15%, and others accounting for 2%. The main shopping center has 7 storeys above ground and 3 storeys below ground, with a total of 48 escalators and 6 large elevators that can accommodate 24 people. There are nearly 100,000 m^{2} (1,100,000 sq ft) of space indoors and outdoors, and 2,800 car parking spaces.

There are multiple performance venues indoors and outdoors in the TaiMall Shopping Center. The Smile Theater on the second basement floor is equipped with a fixed stage, lighting, sound, and backstage. It is suitable for presentations and concerts. The area can create a visual effect extending from the second underground floor to the seventh floor.

In the summer of 2020, the brand-new landmark TaiMall❤Park opened. It covers an area of 20,000 m^{2} (220,000 sq ft) of all-round outdoor leisure space with diversified leisure facilities suitable for families and young people. There is also a "children's play area, a basketball court and an inline roller coaster court. The Outdoor green spaces hosts various markets, concerts, picnics, large Christmas parties, etc., providing diverse leisure life proposals.

== Gallery ==
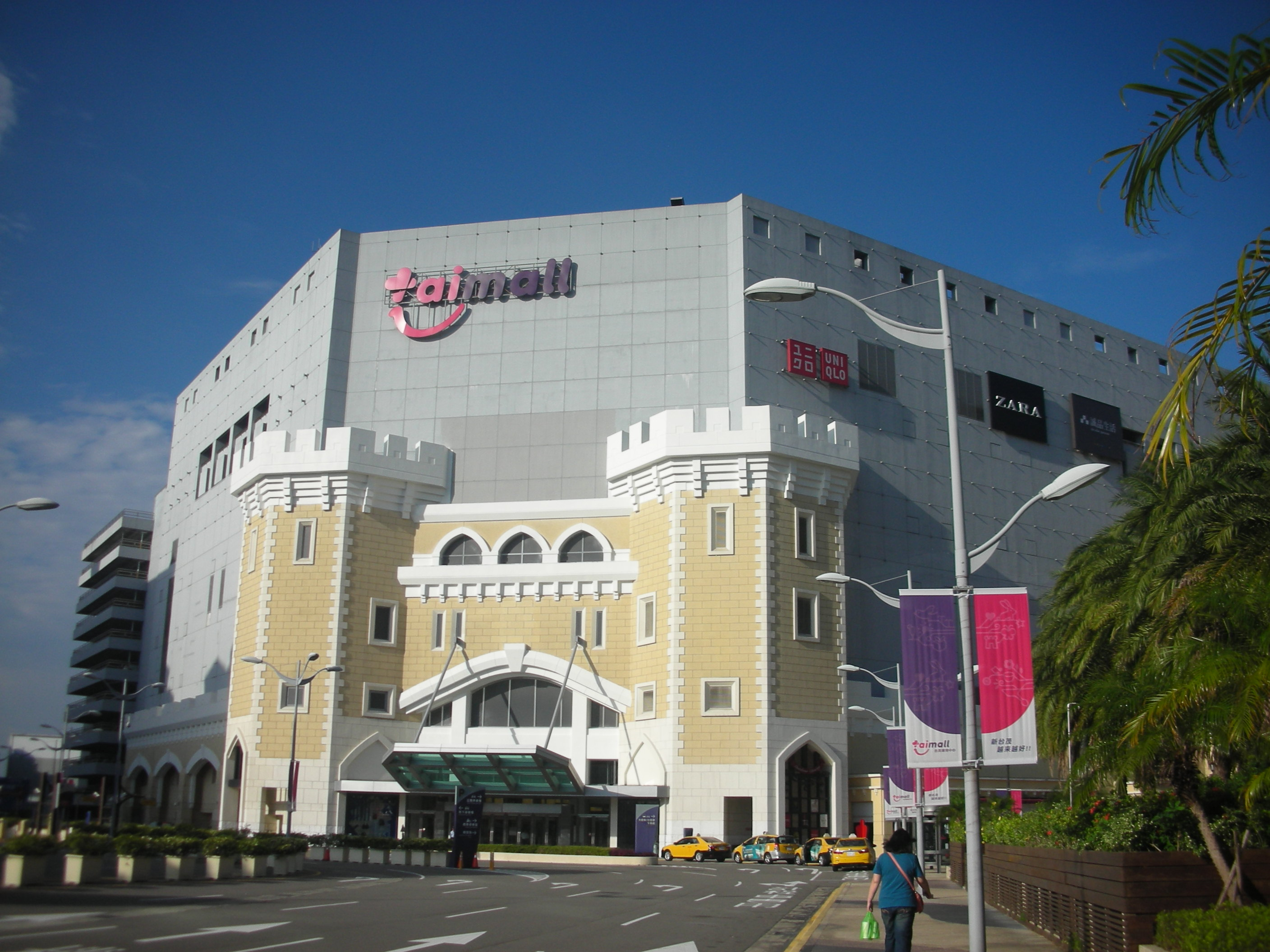
Exterior

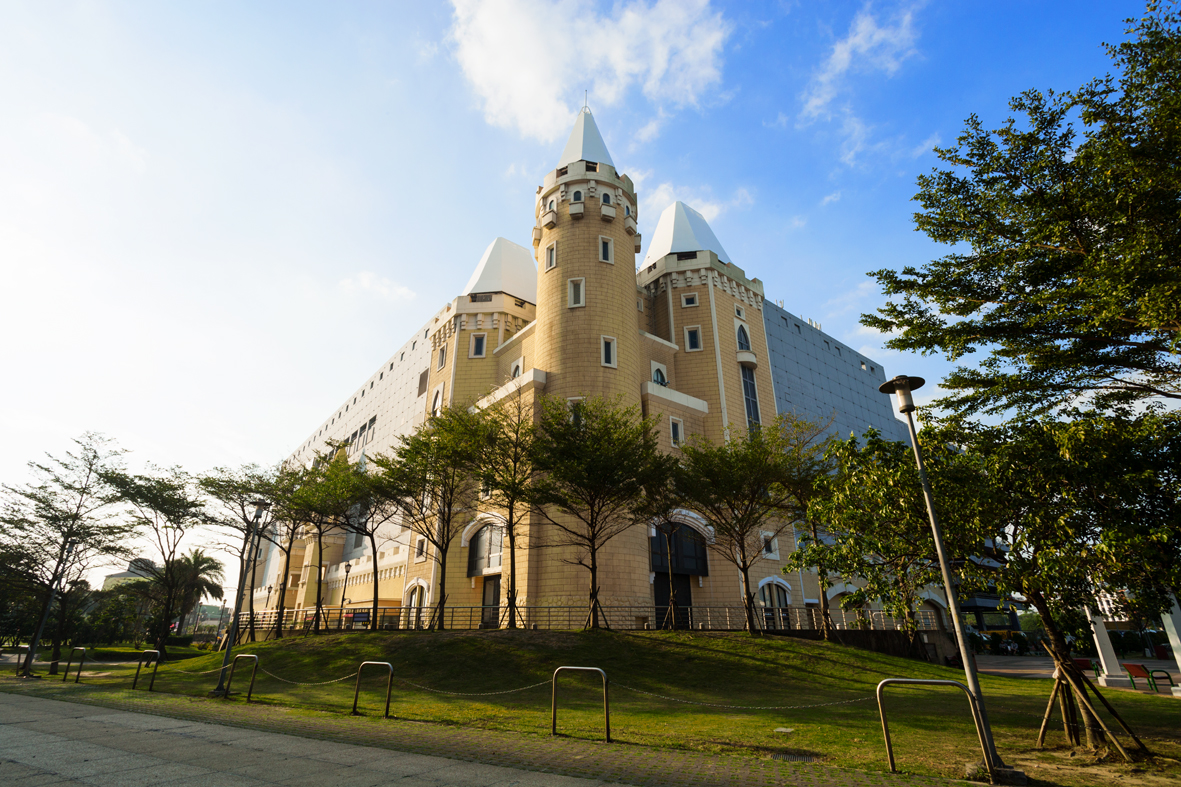
TaiMall Tower Design

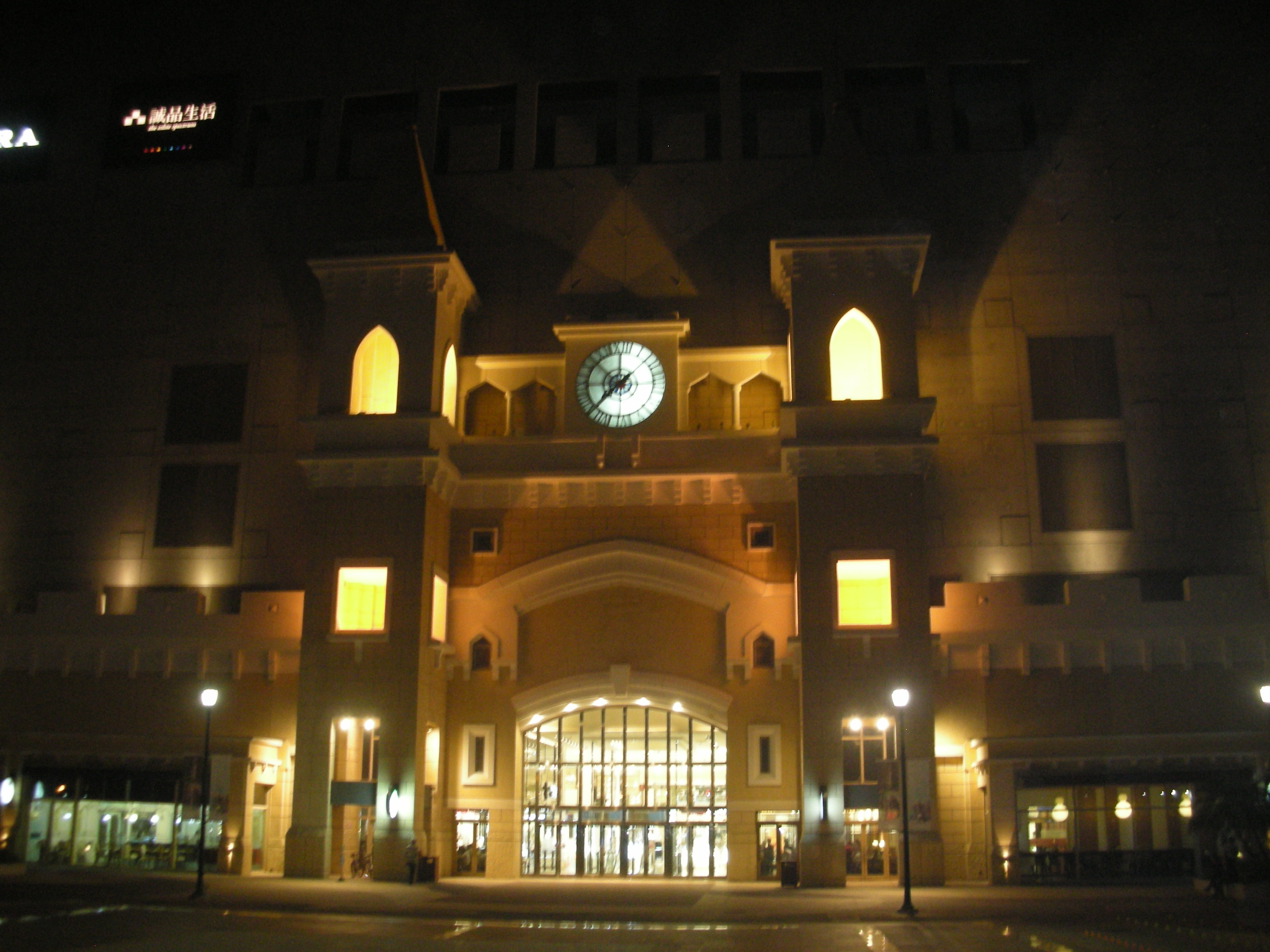
At night

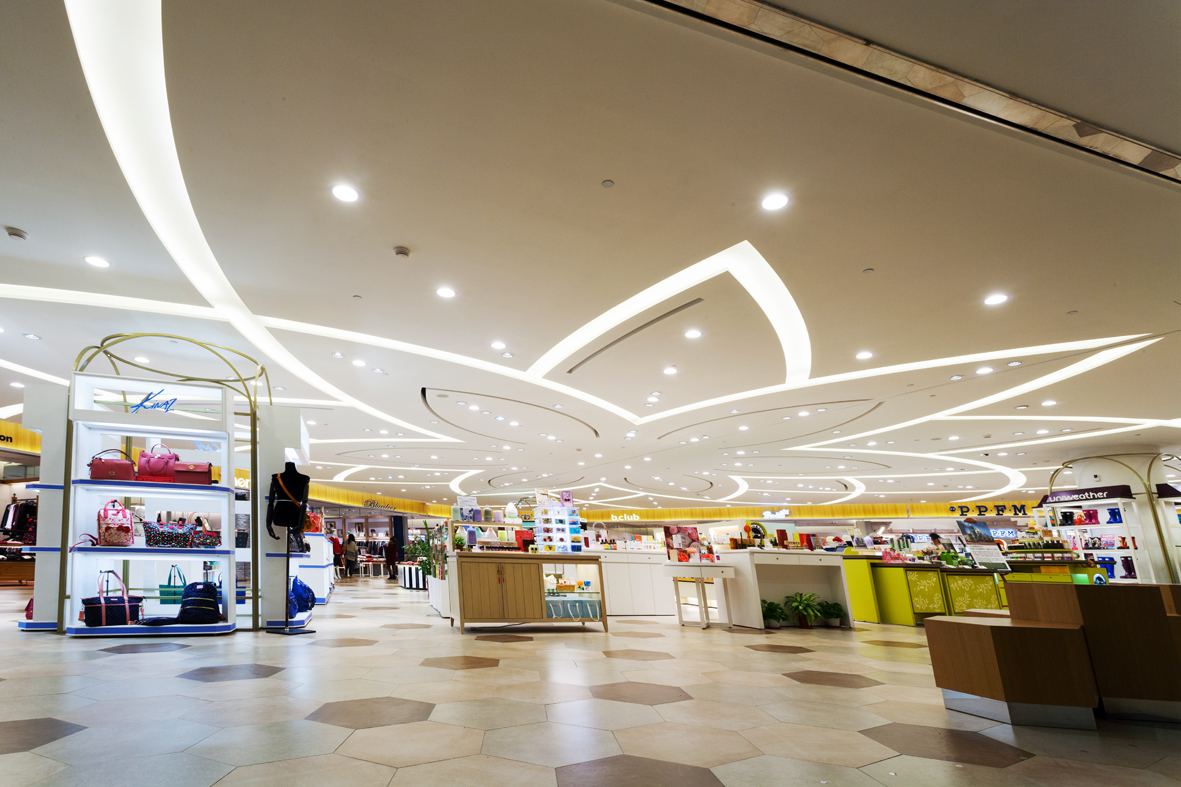
3rd Floor

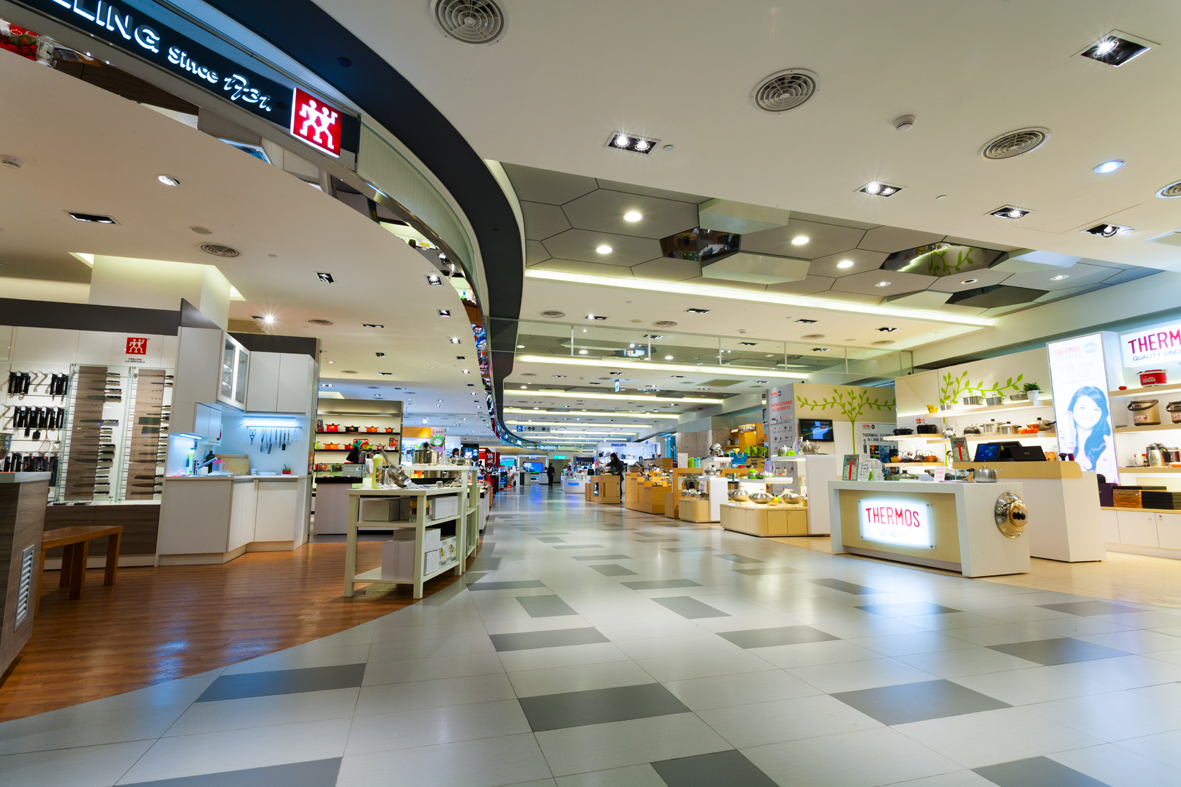
5th Floor

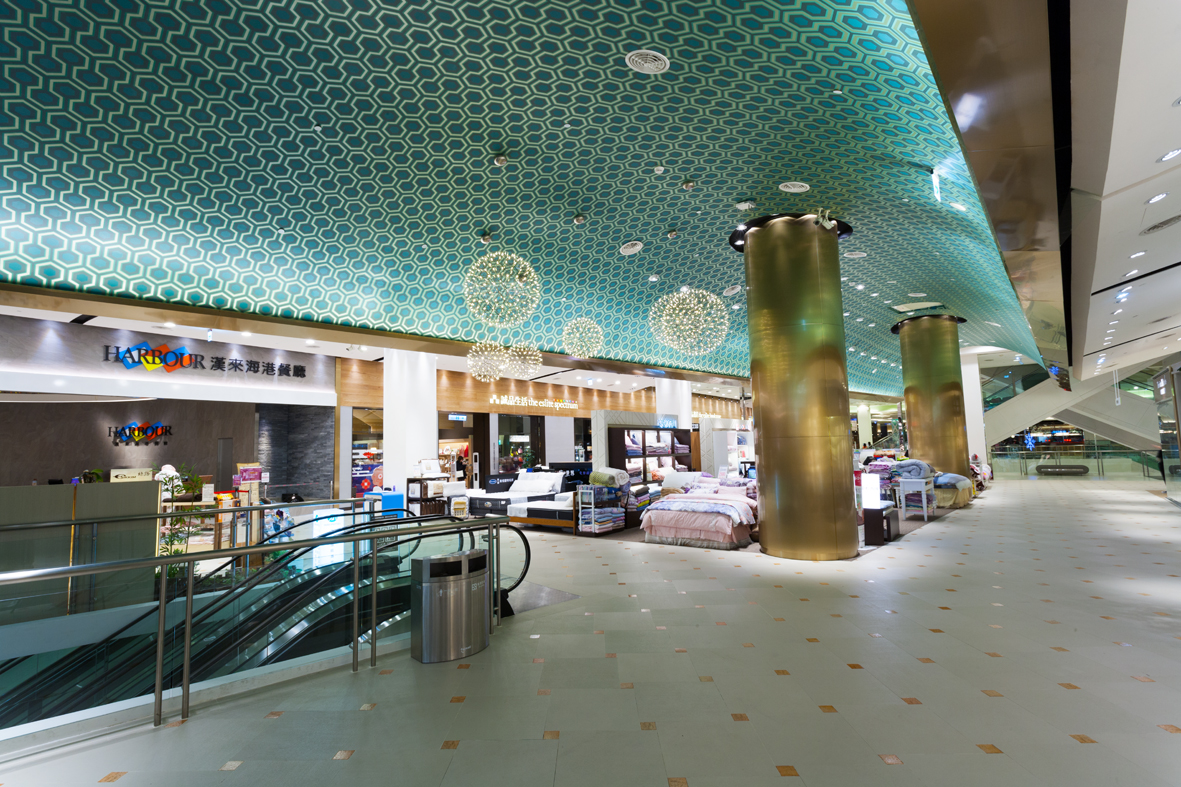
6th Floor

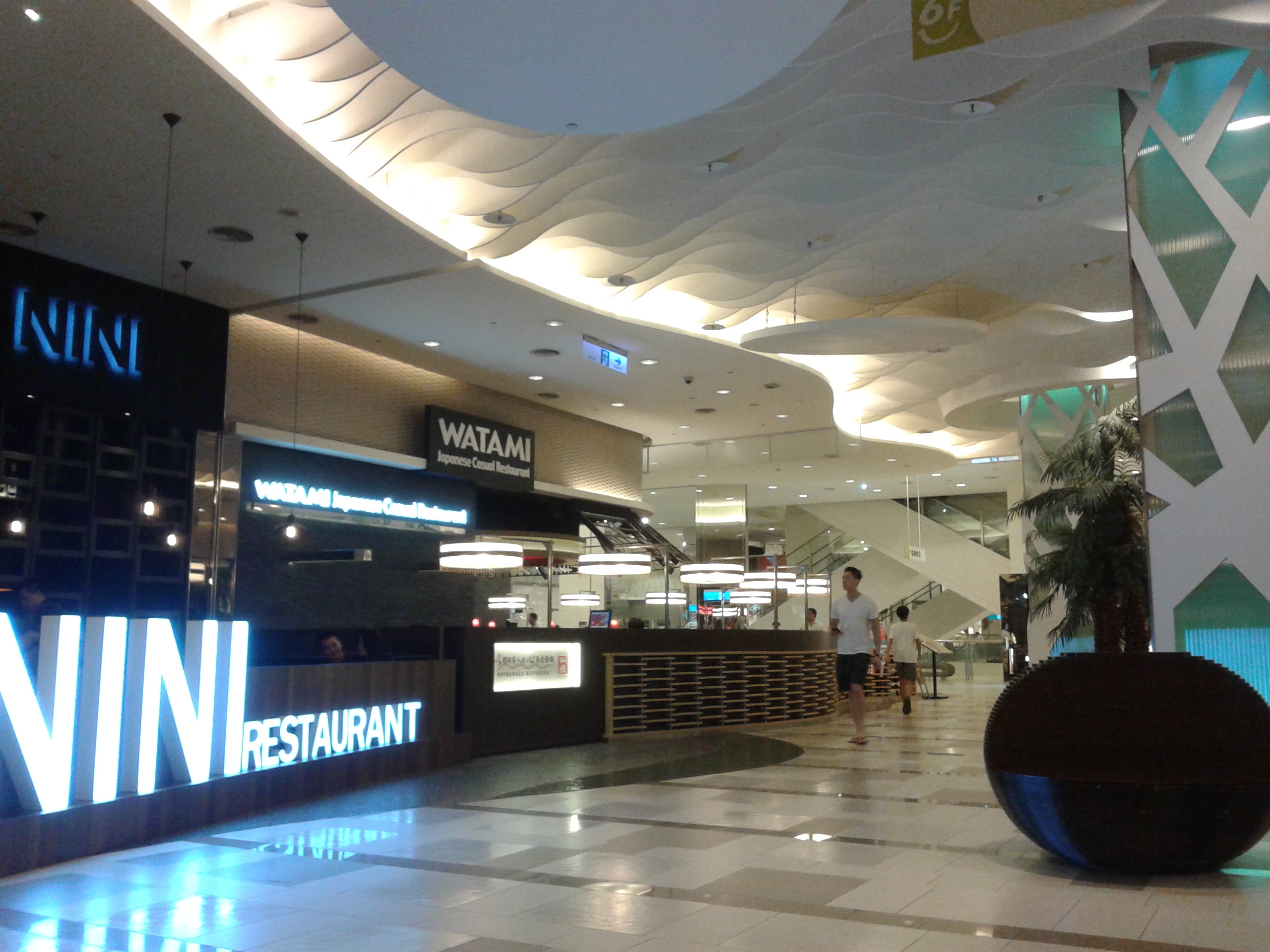
Interior

== See also ==
- List of tourist attractions in Taiwan
- Gloria Outlets
- MetroWalk Shopping Center
