= Landmark Plaza Taoyuan =

Shopping mall in Zhongli, Taoyuan, Taiwan

Landmark Plaza
- 置地廣場·桃園
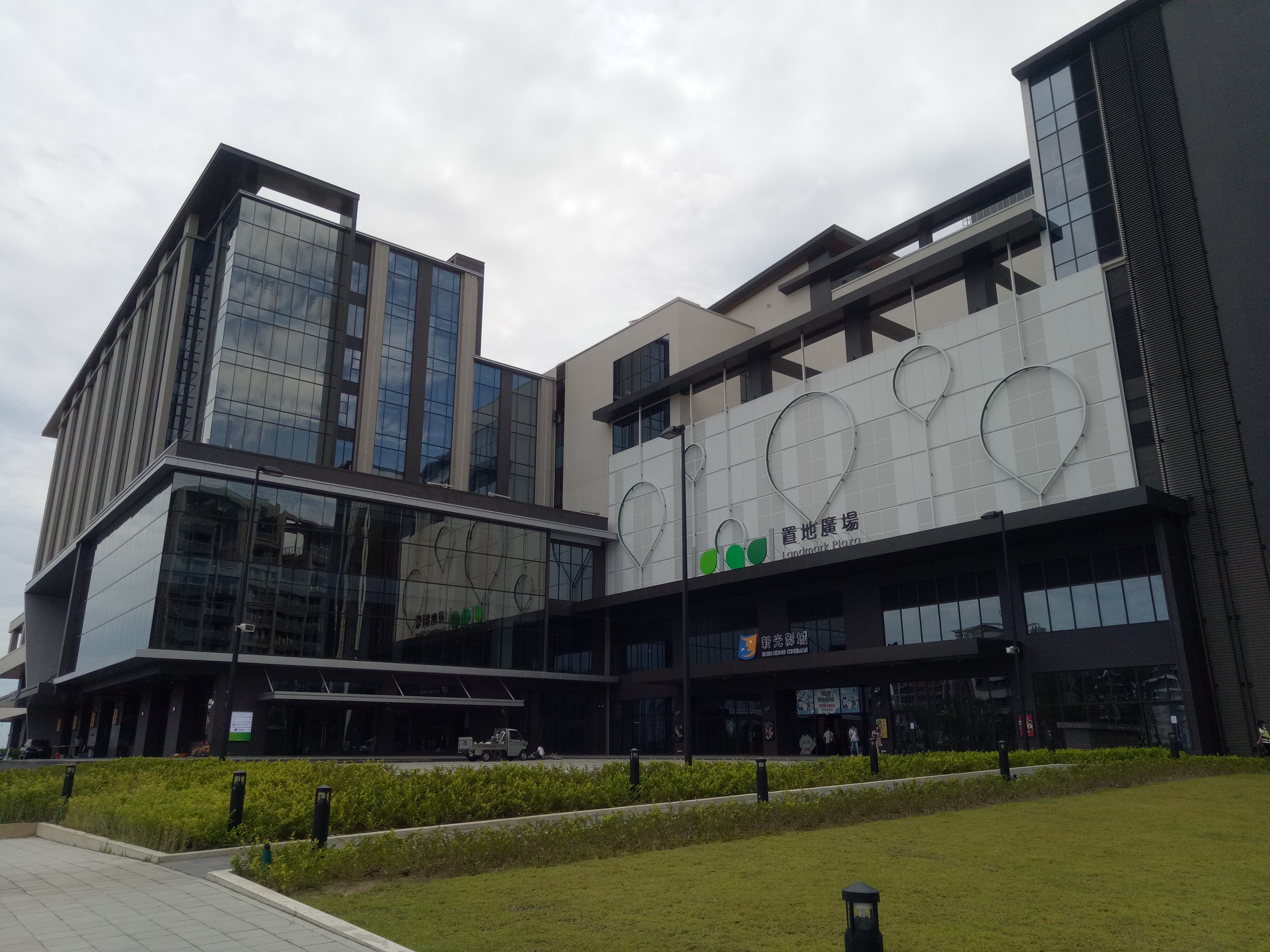
- Location: No. 101, Chunde Road, Zhongli District, Taoyuan, Taiwan
- Coordinates: 25°01′02″N 121°12′59″E
- Opened: August 7, 2020; 6 years ago
- Developer: LinYuan Group
- Manager: LinYuan Group
- Floor area: 84,480 m^{2} (909,300 sq ft) (including parking spaces)
- Floors: 9 floors above ground 4 floor below ground
- Website: landmark-plaza.com.tw

Landmark Plaza (Chinese: 置地廣場·桃園) is a Taiwanese shopping mall in Qingpu Special District, Zhongli District, Taoyuan, Taiwan that opened on 7 August 2020. The total floor area of the mall interior is about 84,480 m^{2} (909,300 sq ft), including parking spaces.

It is the fourth phase of the Cathay Taoyuan Industrial Zone development project. It is on the same base as Gloria Outlets. The mall includes Xpark, the first overseas directly operated aquarium by Yokohama Hakkeijima Sea Paradise, Shin Kong Cinemas and COZZI Blu Hotel.

== Gallery ==
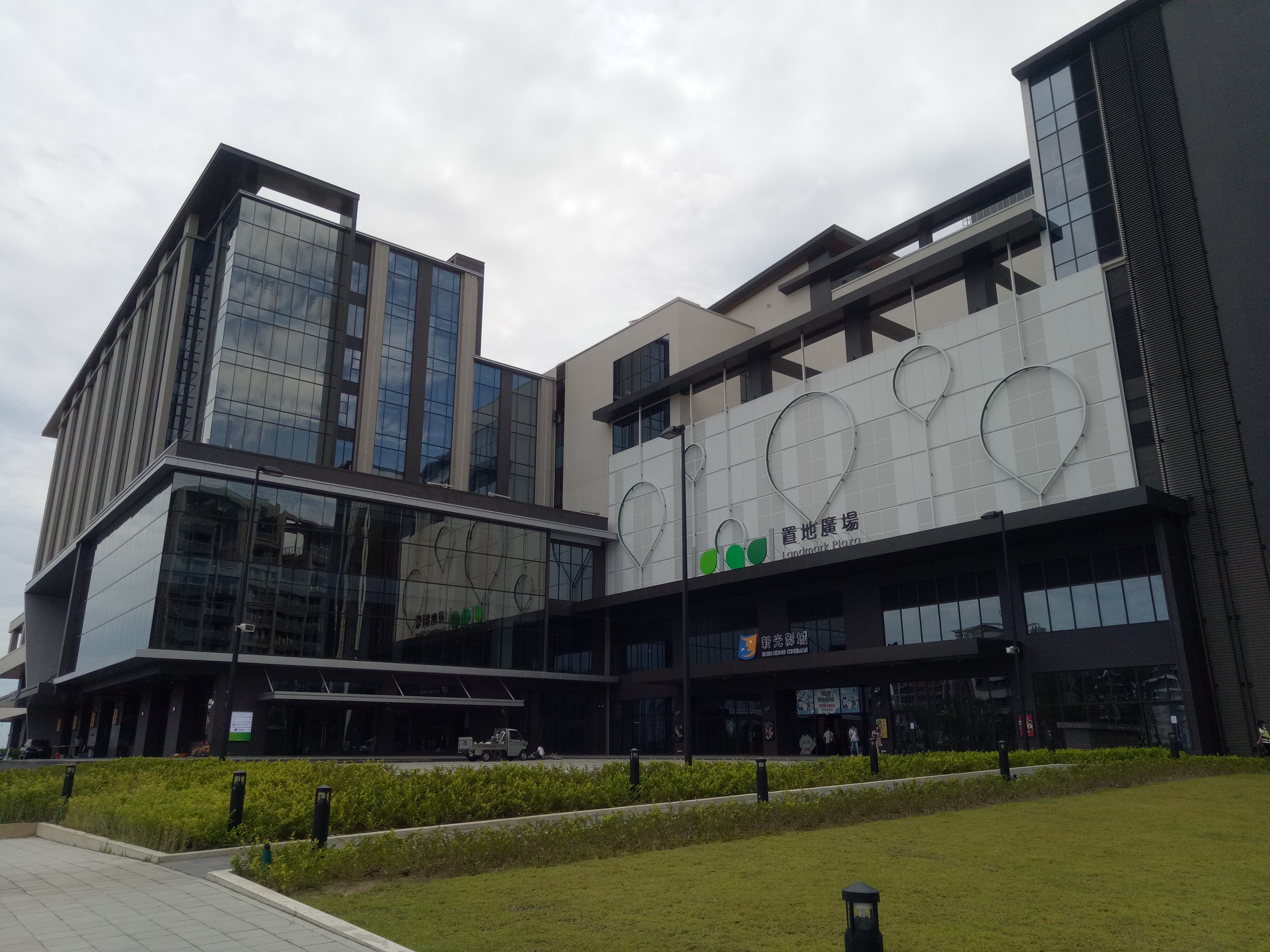
Exterior view in 2020

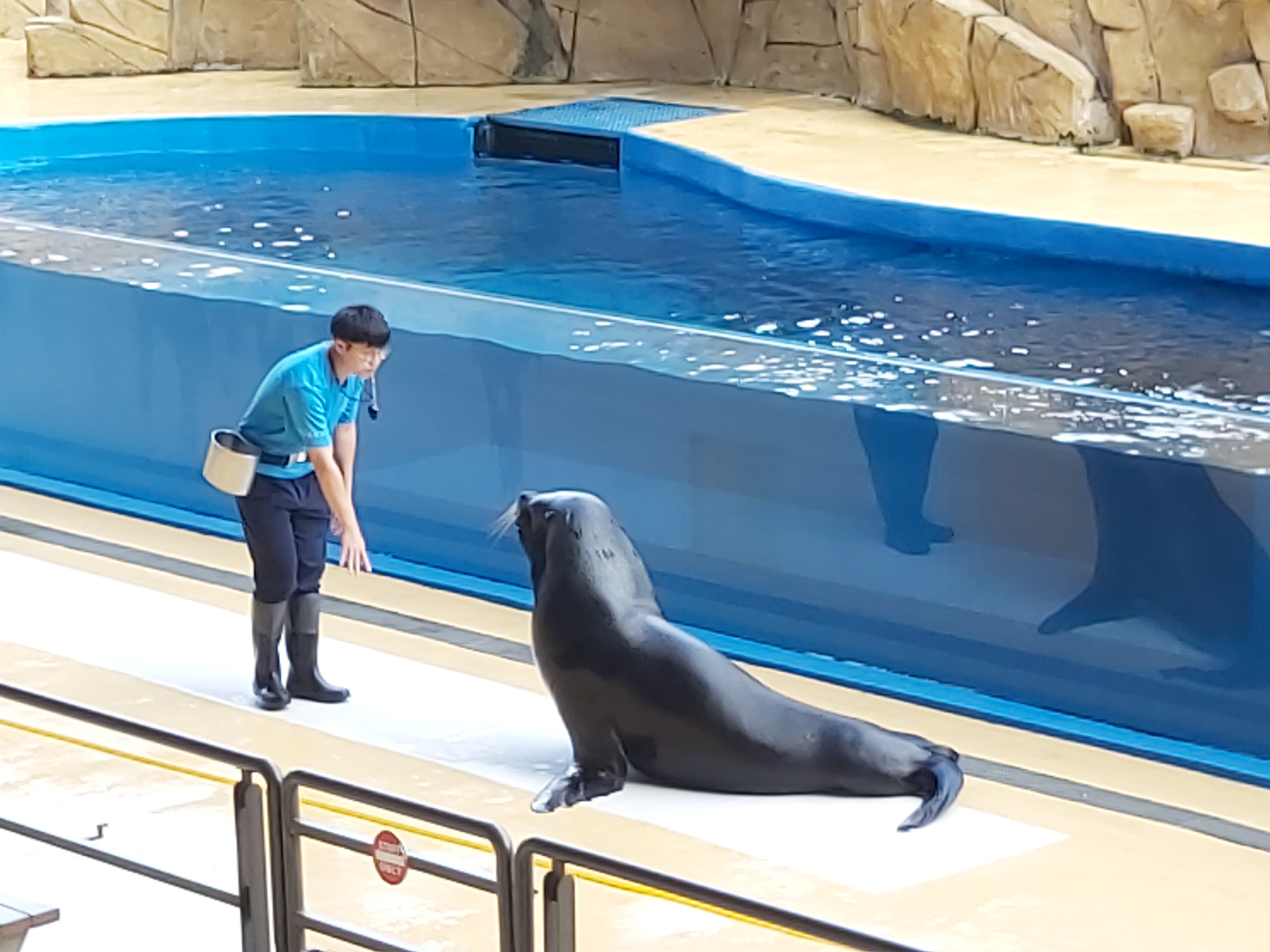
Xpark

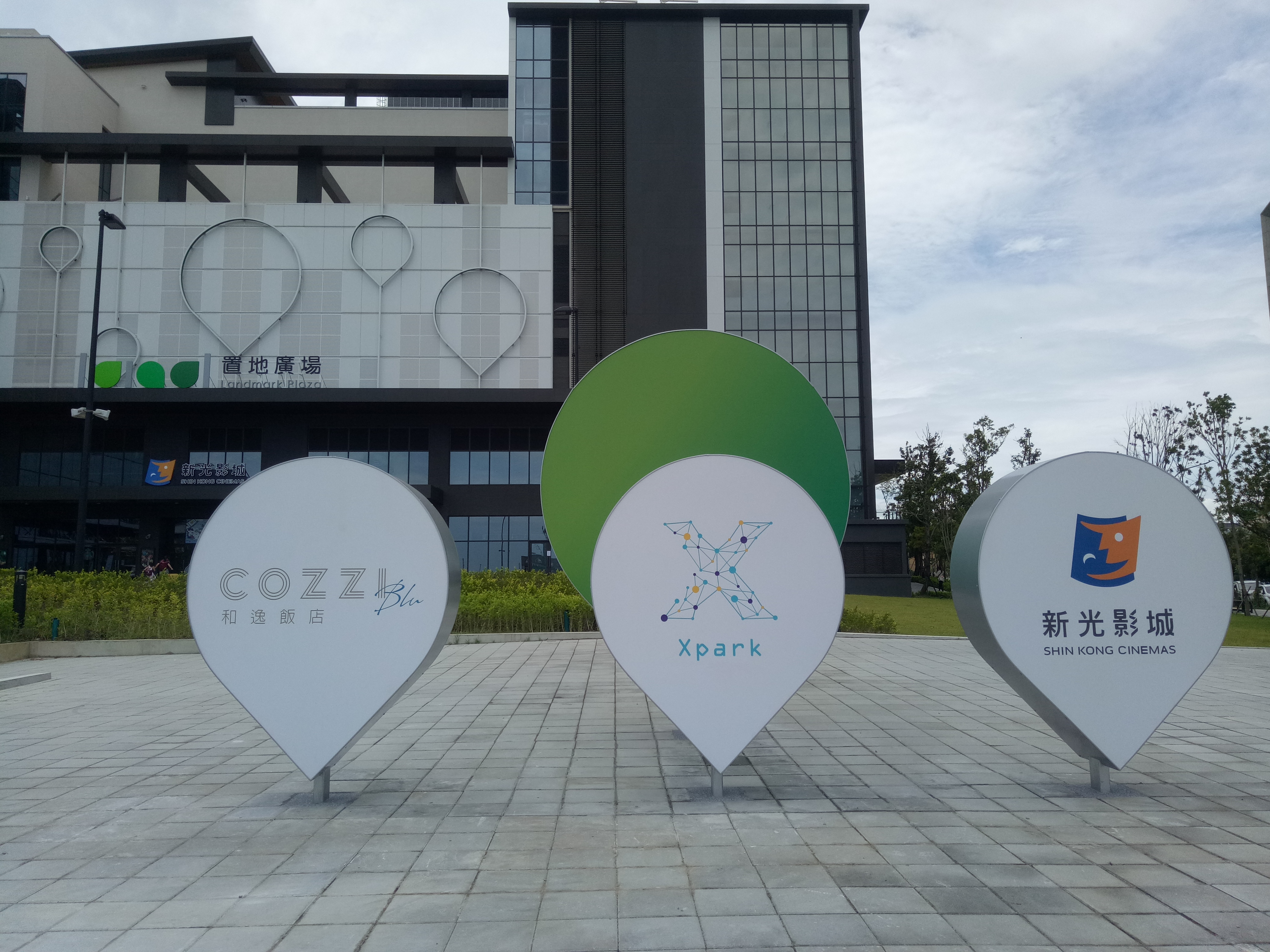
Entrance information

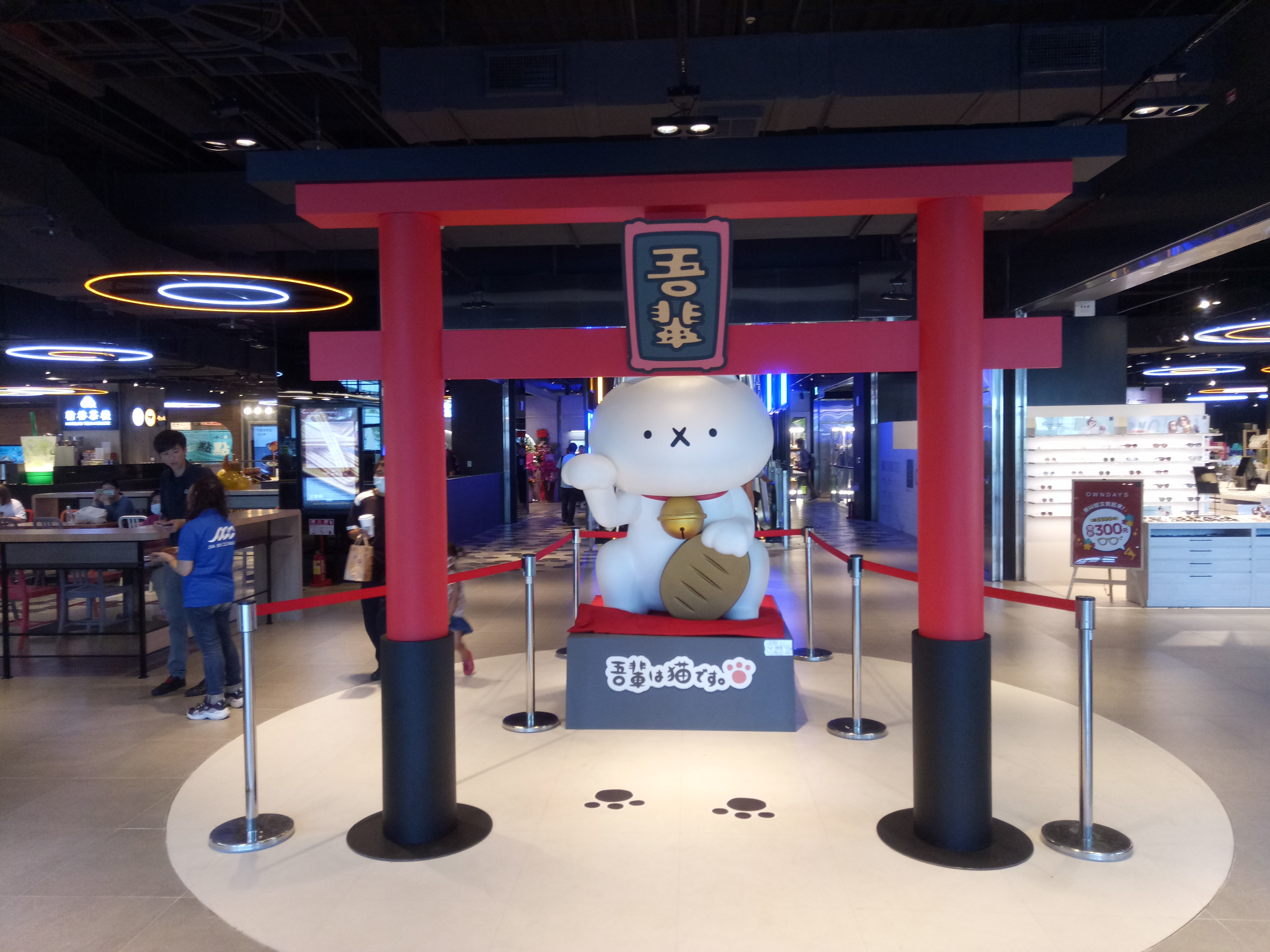
1st floor

== See also ==
- List of tourist attractions in Taiwan
