= Gloria Outlets =

Shopping mall in Zhongli, Taoyuan, Taiwan

- 華泰名品城

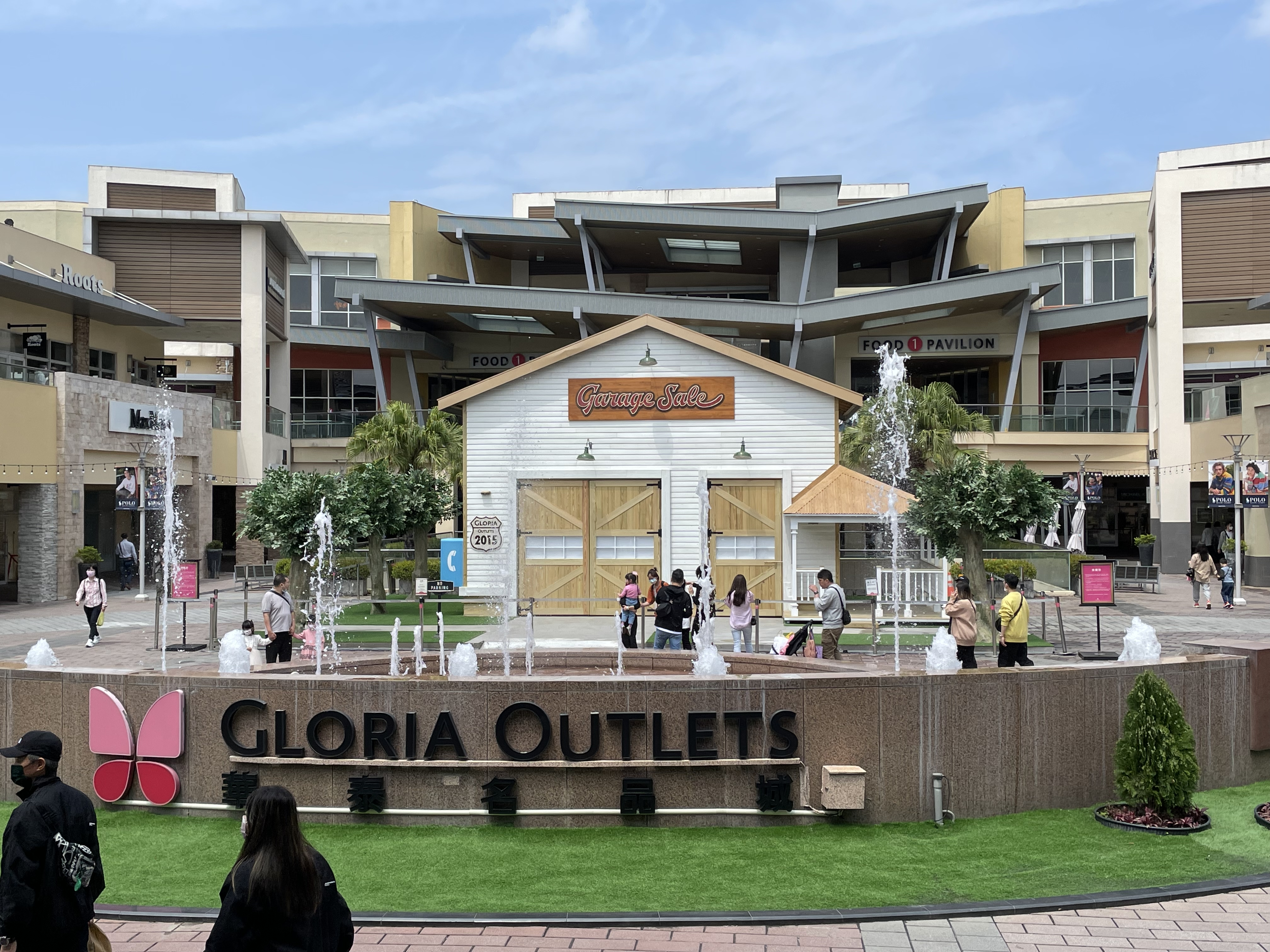
- Location: No. 189, Chunde Road, Zhongli District, Taoyuan, Taiwan
- Coordinates: 25°0′37″N 121°12′56″E
- Opened: 18 December 2015
- Developer: Cathay Life Insurance
- Manager: Gloria Hotel Enterprise Co., Ltd.
- Owner: Taoyuan City Government
- Floor area: 16 hectares
- Floors: 3
- Public transit: Taoyuan HSR station

The Gloria Outlets (Chinese: 華泰名品城; pinyin: Huátài míngpǐn chéng) is an outlet store in Zhongli District, Taoyuan, Taiwan. Designed by AO Architects, it is the largest American-style outdoor shopping mall in Taiwan.

== History ==
The overall development consists of a total of three phases. The first phase of the shopping mall opened on December 18, 2015, introducing 102 brands. The second phase was officially opened on December 22, 2016, and 65 more brands were introduced. The third phase started construction on August 9, 2017, and opened 21 months later on May 8, 2019, introducing 285 brands. Some of the shops include Shiatzy Chen, Timberland, Superdry, Nike, and Puma with discounts up to 80% every day.

== Transportation ==
The mall can be accessed via the Taoyuan HSR station on the Taiwan High Speed Rail and Taoyuan Airport MRT of the Taoyuan Metro.

== Gallery ==
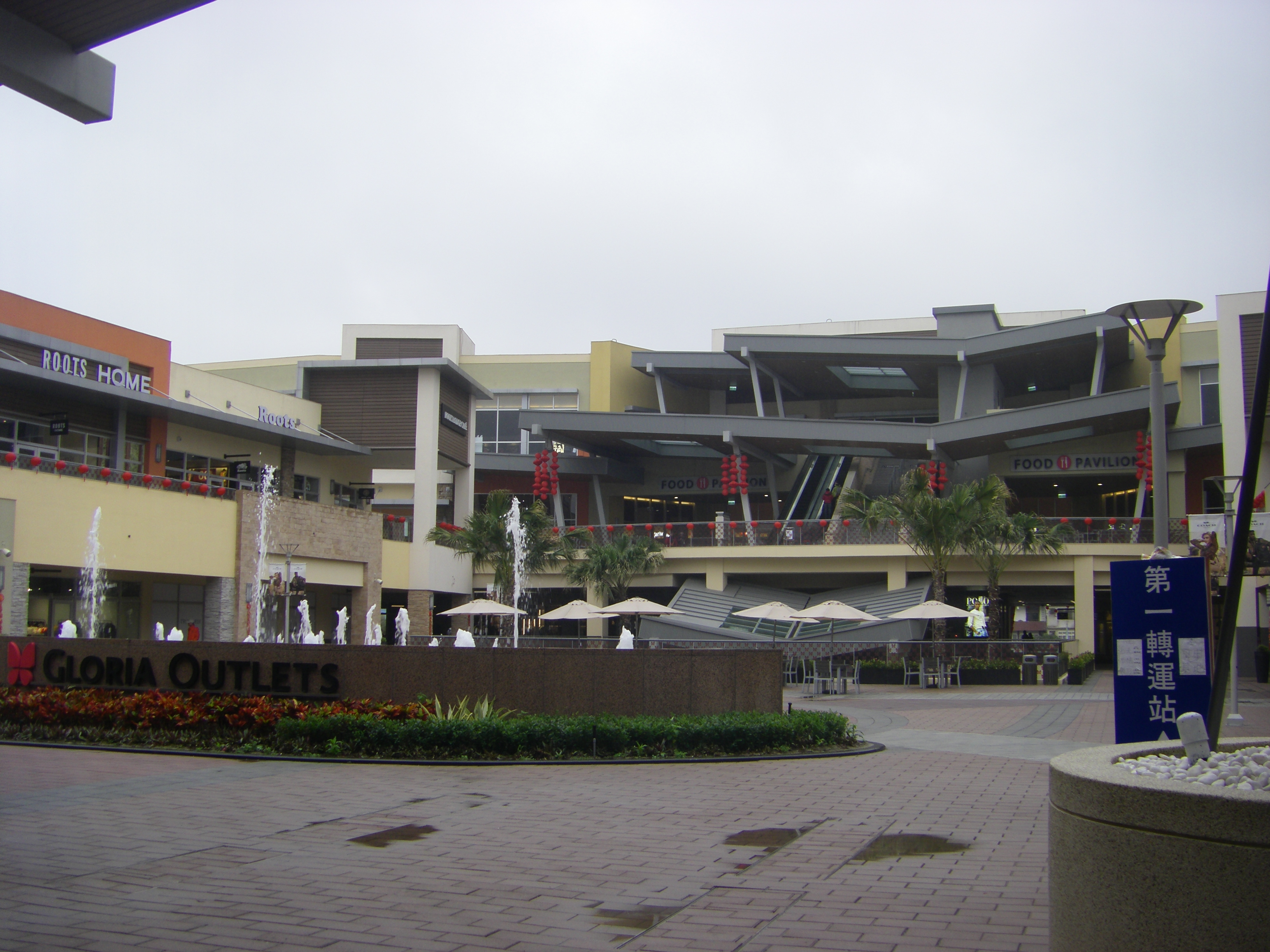
At day

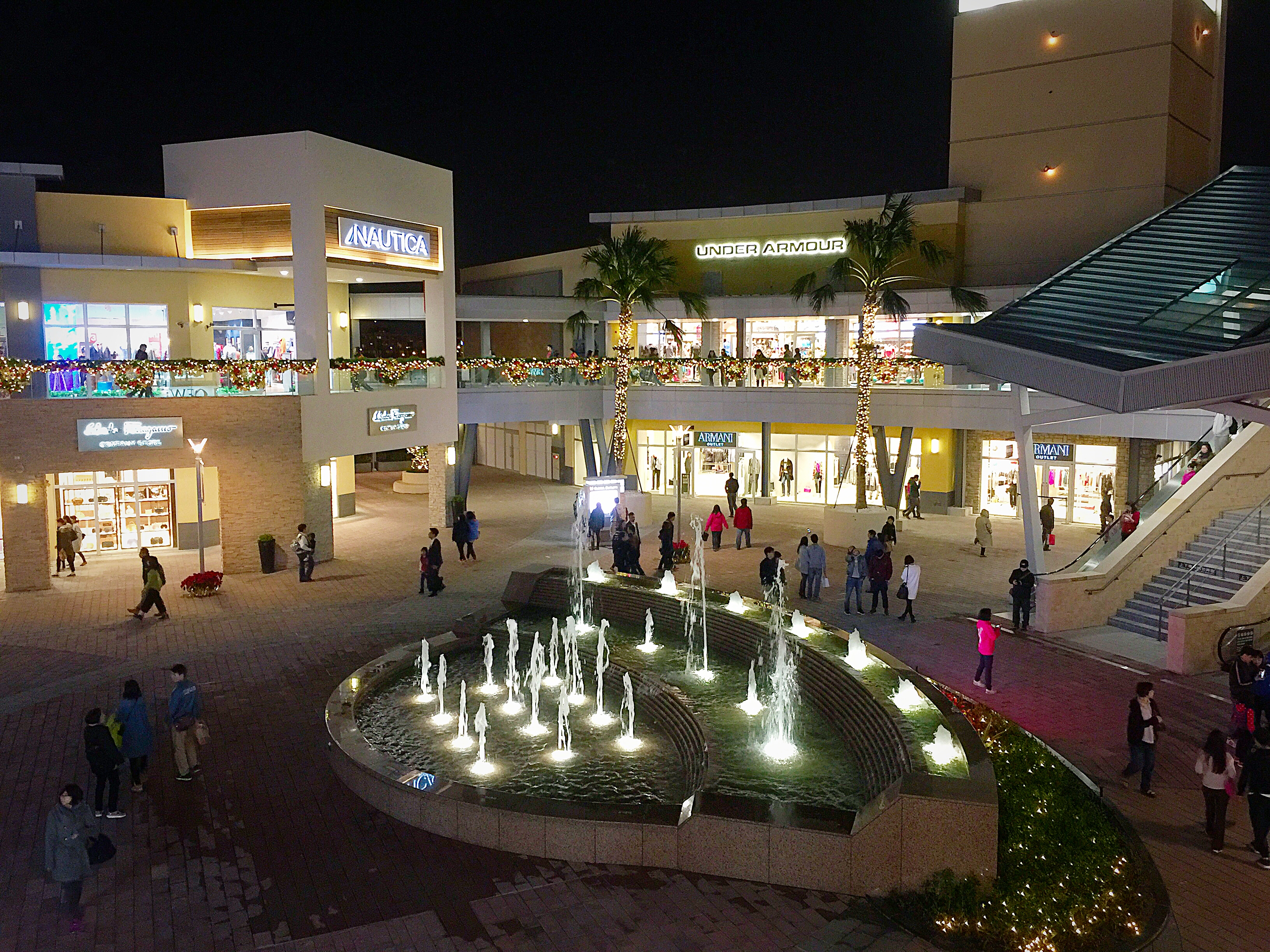
At night

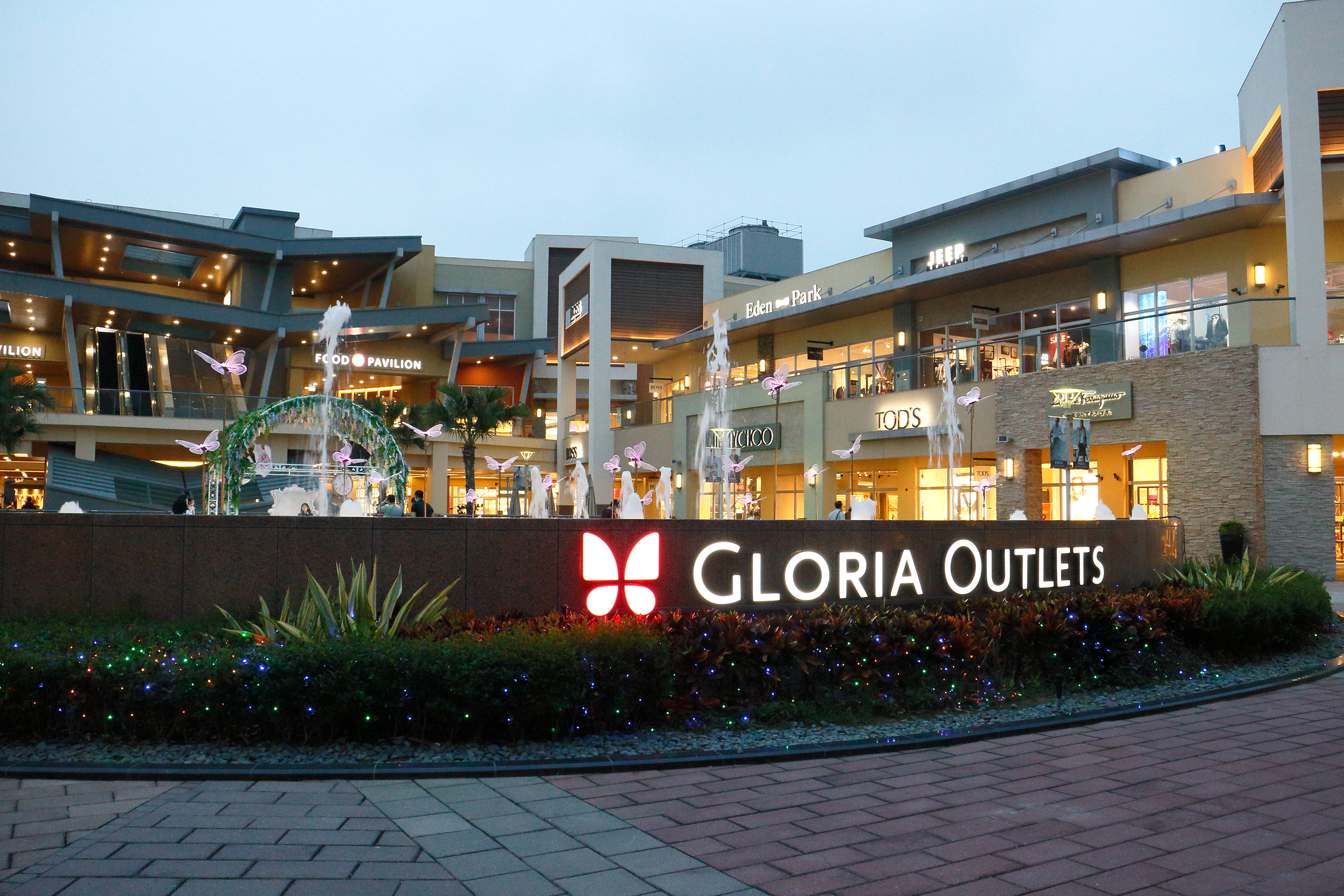
At door

== See also ==
- List of tourist attractions in Taiwan
- TaiMall Shopping Center
- MetroWalk Shopping Center
