= Hot Springs Confederate Monument =

- U.S. National Register of Historic Places
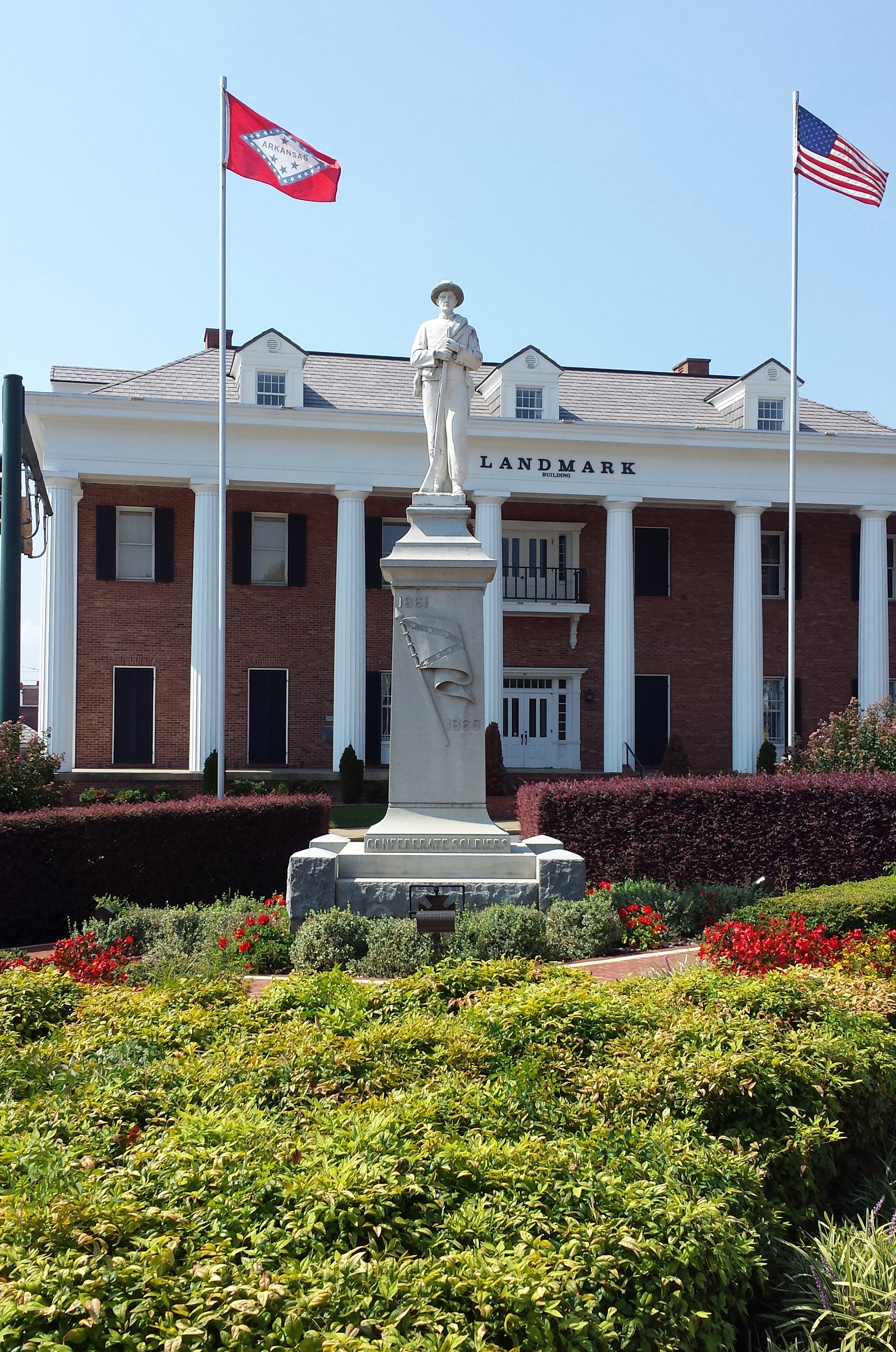

- Location within Arkansas Location within the United States
- Location: Landmark Plaza, bounded by Market St., Ouachita and Central Aves., Hot Springs, Arkansas
- Coordinates: 34°30′28″N 93°3′18″W
- Area: less than one acre
- Built: 1934
- Built by: McNeel Marble Co.
- Architectural style: Classical Revival
- MPS: Civil War Commemorative Sculpture MPS
- NRHP reference No.: 96000457
- Added to NRHP: April 26, 1996

The Hot Springs Confederate Monument is located in Landmark Plaza in central Hot Springs, Arkansas. It is a marble representation of a Confederate Army soldier, manufactured by the McNeel Marble Company of Marietta, Georgia. The figure is 6 feet (1.8 m) tall, and is mounted on a granite base 12 feet (3.7 m) tall and 6 feet square. The monument was placed in 1934 by the local chapter of the United Daughters of the Confederacy, and was the last Confederate monument placed in one of Arkansas' major cities. Lynchings took place at the site in the decades before its construction.

The monument was listed on the National Register of Historic Places in 1996.

== See also ==
- National Register of Historic Places listings in Garland County, Arkansas
