= MetroWalk Shopping Center =

Shopping mall in Zhongli, Taoyuan, Taiwan

- 大江國際購物中心

- Location: No. 501, Section 2, Zhongyuan Road, Zhongli District, Taoyuan, Taiwan
- Coordinates: 25°0′4.68″N 121°13′43.29″E
- Opened: March 2001
- Developer: DRC Consultants, Inc. Jerde Partnership Inter., Inc; E.D.S. International
- Manager: DA CHIANG INTERNATIONAL Co., Ltd.
- Floor area: 76,033 m^{2} (818,410 sq ft)
- Floors: 5 floors above ground 2 floors below ground
- Parking: 2000 parking spaces
- Website: www.metrowalk.com.tw

The MetroWalk Shopping Center (Chinese: 大江國際購物中心; pinyin: Dàjiāng guójì gòuwù zhòng xīn) is a shopping mall in Zhongli District, Taoyuan, Taiwan that opened in 2001. There are shopping facilities such as the Eslite Bookstore inside the mall. In addition, Sega, a video game manufacturer, also has the first overseas branch of Joypolis, the company's theme park brand, in the shopping center.

== Stores ==
Sources:

- UNIQLO
- H&M
- Zara
- Muji
- Studio A
- Vue Cinemas
- Sega
- Starbucks
- Eslite Bookstore

== Gallery ==
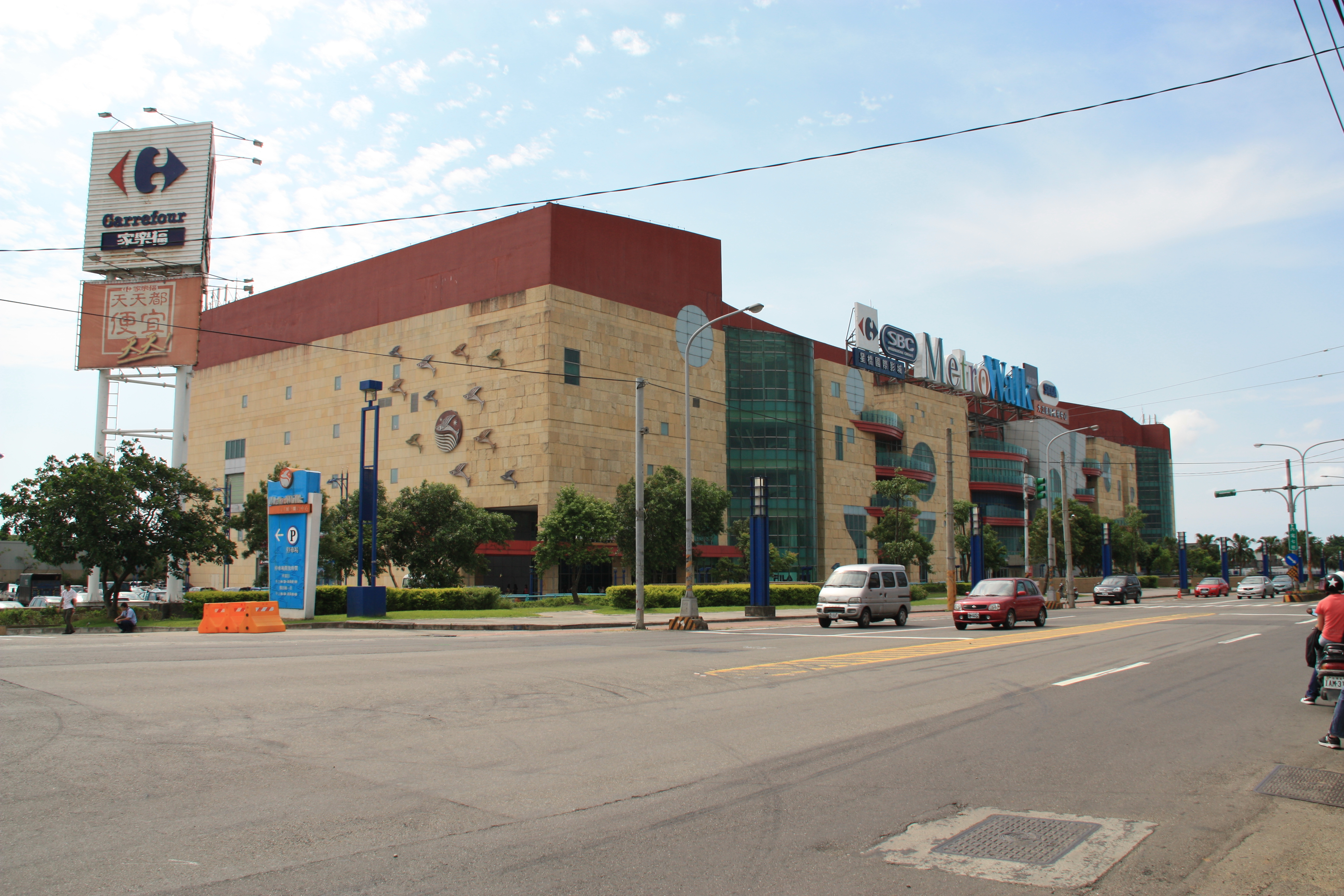
Exterior

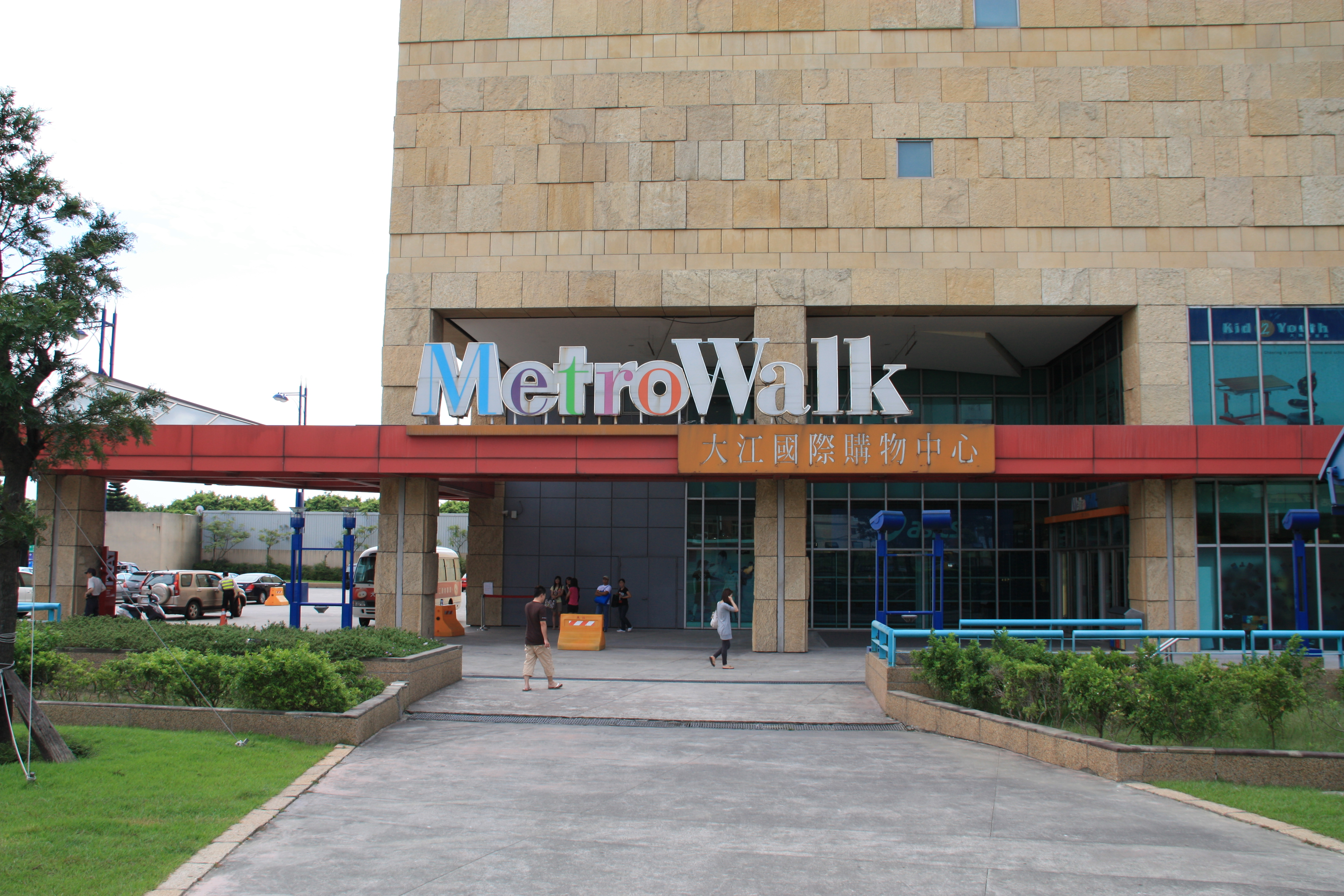
Entrance

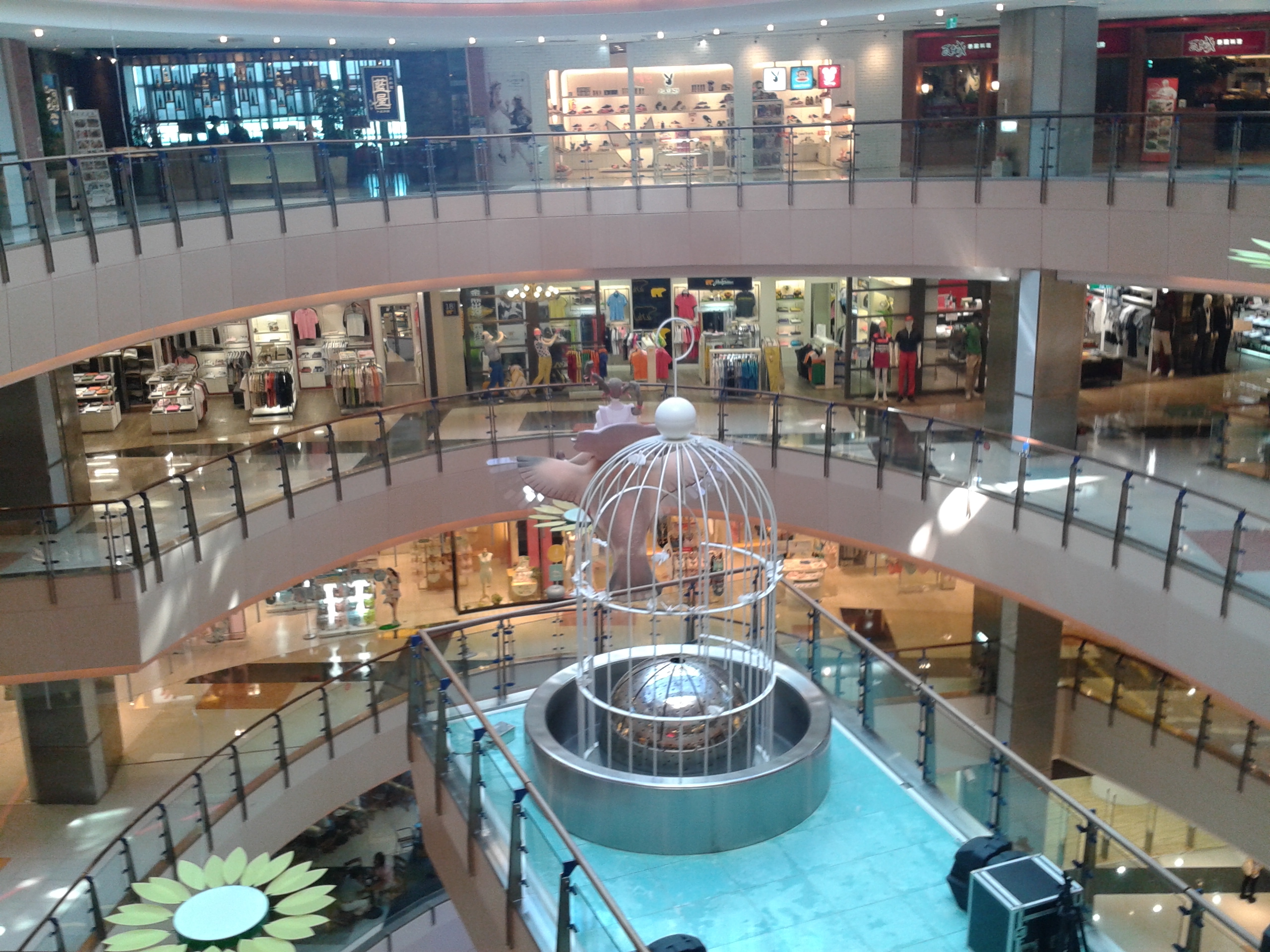
Interior

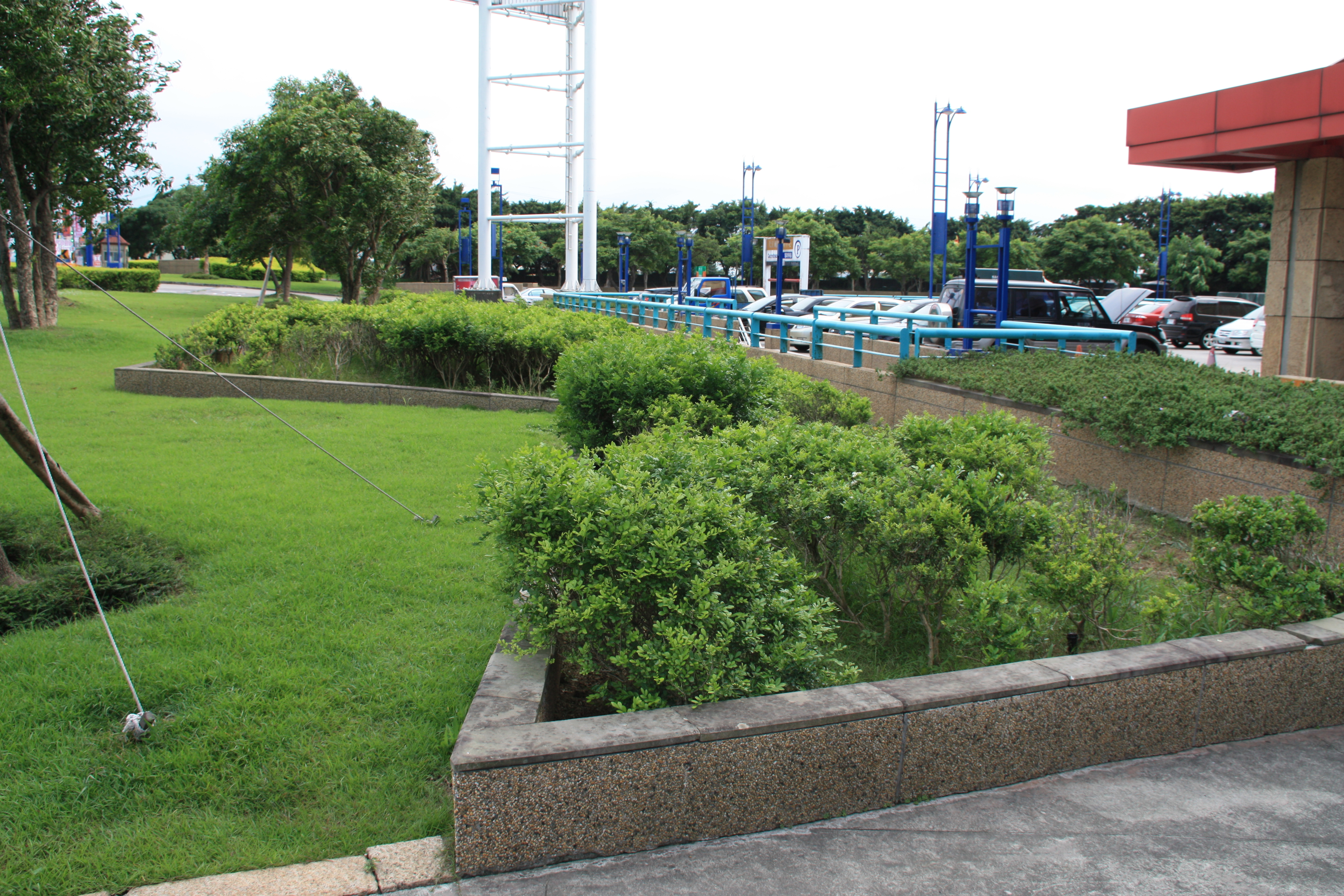
Garden

== See also ==
- List of tourist attractions in Taiwan
- Gloria Outlets, another mall in Taoyuan City
