= Xinyi Skyway System =

Footbridge System in Taipei, Taiwan

A skyway from the system connecting Breeze Center and Shin Kong Mitsukoshi, photographed from Shin Kong Mitsukoshi in 2020

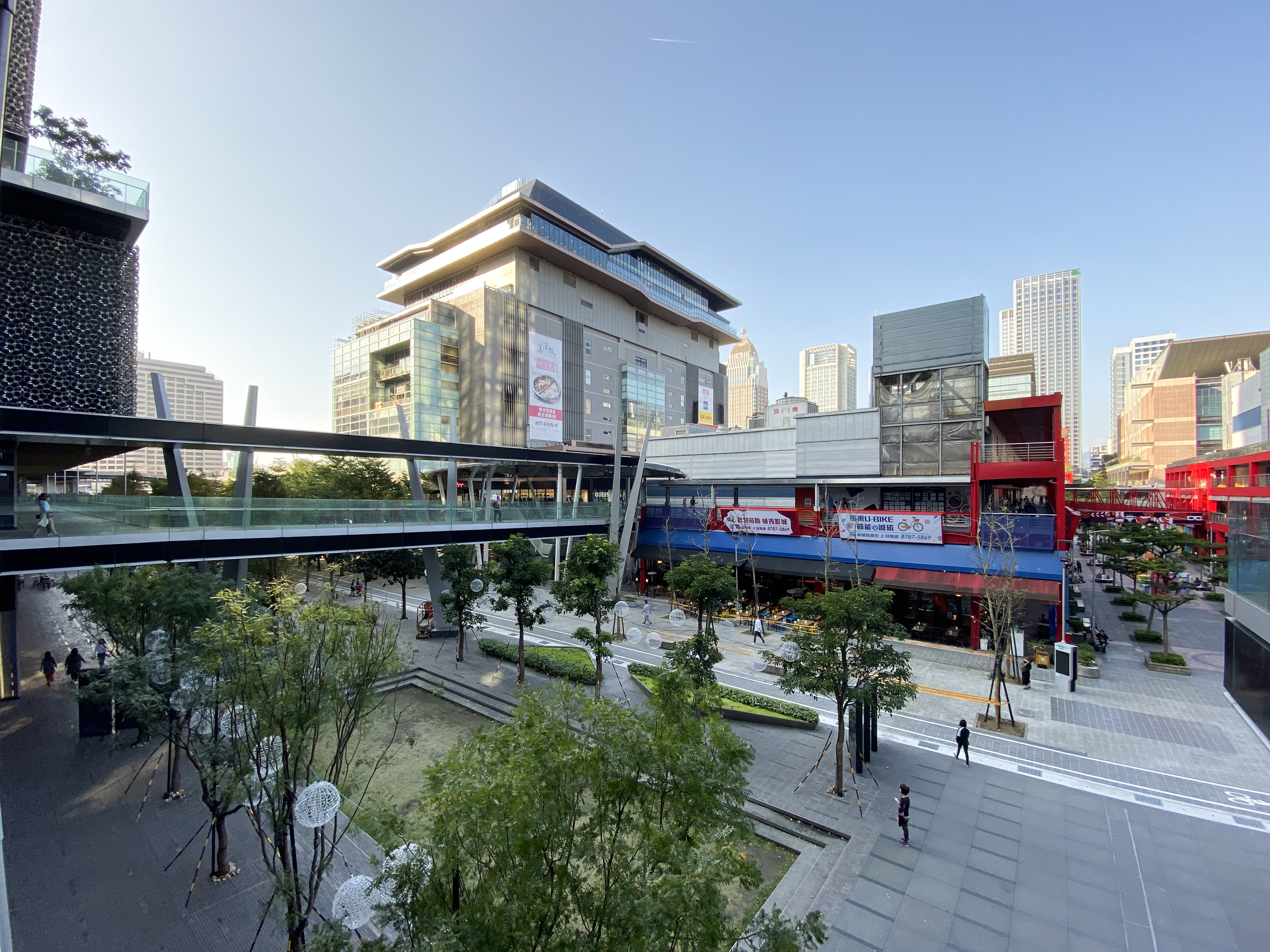
A skyway from the system connecting Taipei Nan Shan Plaza and Vieshow Cinemas Xinyi, photographed from Taipei Nan Shan Plaza in 2019

The Xinyi Skyway System (Chinese: 信義商圈空橋系統) is a series of skyways in Xinyi Planning District, Taipei, Taiwan, aiming to separate pedestrians and vehicles, and to prevent pedestrians exposed to outside weather.

Planned by Taipei City Government, the system connects various important buildings in the Planning District, including Taipei World Trade Center, Taipei 101, Breeze Center, ATT 4 FUN, Vieshow Cinemas Xinyi, Bellavita, Far Eastern Department Stores, and Shin Kong Mitsukoshi Taipei Xinyi Place.

== System ==
The Xinyi Skyway System connects over 11 department stores in Xinyi Planning District. Aside from department stores, it also connects Cathay Financial Center, and Taipei 101/World Trade Center metro station. In addition to skyways, the system also features underpasses that link Dream Plaza, Breeze Center, and Taipei City Hall metro station.

Most routes are open 24/7, except those connecting to Taipei 101 which closes at designated times. The system spans nearly all buildings in the district, with the exception of the link between Taipei 101 and Taipei City Hall, which is expected to be connected in 2028 upon completion Nanshan Xinyi A21. A full walkthrough over the system usually takes 30 minutes.

== History ==
The Xinyi Skyway System can traces its origins to 1990, when Taipei City Government formally defined a clear definition of skyway system in Taiwan amid the city's eastward development shift. Inspired by Minneapolis Skyway System, the government proposed the constructing plan for Xinyi Planning District in 2000, aiming to interconnect buildings with a total length of 2,293 metres.

Construction began in May 2003, with the first part completed by the end of the year, while other parts finished in 2004. The system is designed by Shu Chang & associates, architects (Chinese: 張樞建築師事務所). Xinyi Planning District has significantly changed after the skyway system completed, with media attributing the area's rapid growth to the system. It later won Taipei Landscape Award in 2005, and later Taiwan Real Estate Excellence Awards in 2007.

In 2016, Shin Kong Mitsukoshi opened stores within the skyway. In 2019, foot traffic in the skyway system exceeded over 10 million, according to statistics. The district is one of the most visited place in Taiwan. In 2025, Nanshan Life Insurance proposed an extension to Nanshan Xinyi A21 under construction at the time, which was approved in the year. The expansion is expected to compelete in 2028 and connects Taipei City Hall.

== See also ==
- Xinyi District
- Central Elevated Walkway
- KLCC-Bukit Bintang Pedestrian Walkway
