= TWTC International Trade Building =

Coordinates: 25°2′3.9″N 121°33′40.2″E

- 台北世界貿易中心國際貿易大樓
- TWTC International Trade Building in 2025

General information
- Type: Office
- Location: Xinyi, Taipei, Taiwan

Height
- Height: 142.92 m (468.9 ft)

Technical details
- Floor count: 39
- Floor area: 111,821 m^{2}
- Grounds: 5,181 m^{2}

Design and construction
- Architecture firm: Sinotec Engineering Consultants Inc.
- Developer: Sinotec Engineering Consultants Inc.

Website
- www.twtcitb.com.tw

The TWTC International Trade Building (Chinese: 台北世界貿易中心國際貿易大樓) is a skyscraper in Xinyi District, Taipei, Taiwan. As of 2022, it is the eleventh tallest in Xinyi Planning District (after Taipei 101, The Sky Taipei, Taipei Nan Shan Plaza, Fubon Xinyi A25, Cathay Landmark, Farglory Financial Center, Hua Nan Bank Headquarters, Uni-President International Tower, Taipei City Hall Bus Station, and United Daily News Office Building). The height of building is 142.920 m, the floor area is 111,791.52 m^{2}, and it comprises 34 floors above ground, as well as 3 basement levels.

== Tenants ==
- Argentina Trade and Cultural Office in Taiwan
- Commercial Office of Peru to Taipei
- European Economic and Trade Office in Taiwan
- HSBC Bank (Taiwan)
- India Taipei Association
- Israel Economic and Cultural Office in Taipei
- Italian Economic, Trade and Cultural Promotion Office in Taipei
- Korean Mission in Taipei
- Lithuanian Trade Representative Office in Taipei
- Luxembourg Trade and Investment Office, Taipei
- Mexican Trade Services Documentation and Cultural Office in Taipei
- Polish Office in Taipei
- PricewaterhouseCoopers Taiwan
- Slovak Economic and Cultural Office in Taipei
- Swedish Trade and Invest Council
- Trade Office of Swiss Industries in Taipei
- Turkish Trade Office in Taipei
- Ulaanbaatar Trade and Economic Representative Office in Taipei

== See also ==
- Taipei World Trade Center
- List of tallest buildings in Taiwan
- Xinyi Special District

Preceded by Taiwan Power Building	Tallest building in Taiwan; 1988 – 1990	Succeeded by Tuntex Tower
