= A19 =

A19, A-19, etc. may refer to:

== Arts and media ==
- A19, a 2002 album by the Battlefield Band
- "A19", a song by Maxïmo Park from the Missing Songs album

== Science and technology ==
=== Vehicles ===
- Airbus A319, a narrow-body passenger aircraft from the Airbus A320 family
- Aero A.19, a 1923 Czech fighter aircraft design
- Arrows A19, a Formula One car
- Saro A.19 Cloud, a 1930 British flying boat
- Vultee A-19, a 1939 American attack aircraft

=== Other uses in science and technology ===
- A19 light bulb, a common household bulb
- 122 mm gun M1931/37 (A-19), a Soviet field gun
- British NVC community A19 (Ranunculus aquatilis community), a plant community
- HLA-A19, a human serotype
- Subfamily A19, a rhodopsin-like receptors subfamily
- Apple A19, a mobile processor produced by Apple

== Other uses ==
- English Opening (Encyclopaedia of Chess Openings code A19, among others)
- A19 road, a code used to identify a particular road in several countries
- A19 (Xinyi), a shopping mall in Taipei, Taiwan
