= Xinyi Planning District =

Urban development area in Taipei, Taiwan

Coordinates: 25°02′10″N 121°34′15″E

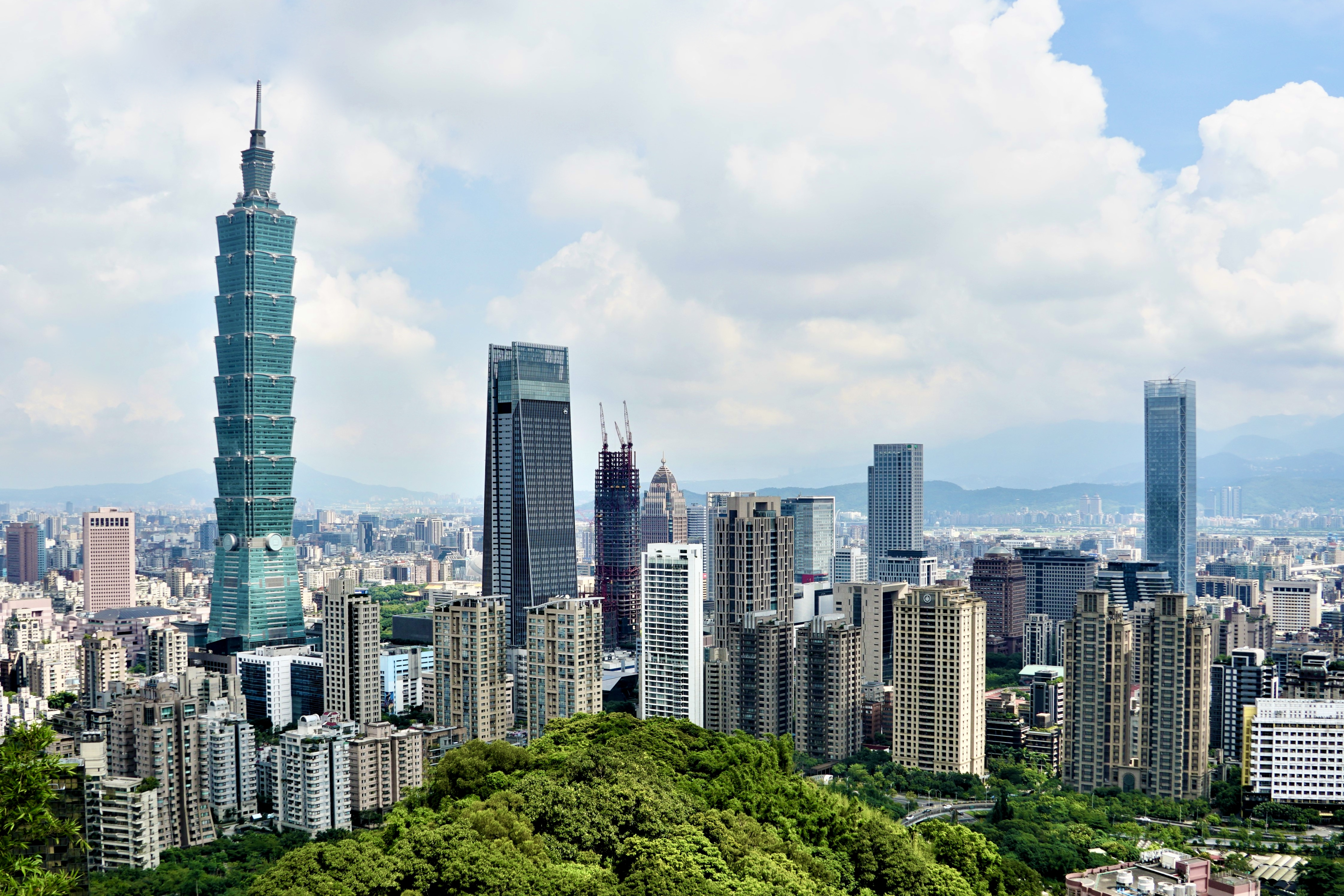
Skyline and buildings of Xinyi Planning District (2022)

Xinyi Planning District (Chinese: 信義計畫區), also known as the Xinyi Planning Area, is located in Xinyi District, Taipei, Taiwan. The total area of the Xinyi Planning District is 153 hectares. It was designed in the 1970s and developed from the 1980s onward. Xinyi Planning District is the prime central business district of Taipei. Important infrastructure, such as Taipei 101, Taipei City Hall, Taipei International Convention Center and Taipei World Trade Center, is located within this area.

== Historical development ==
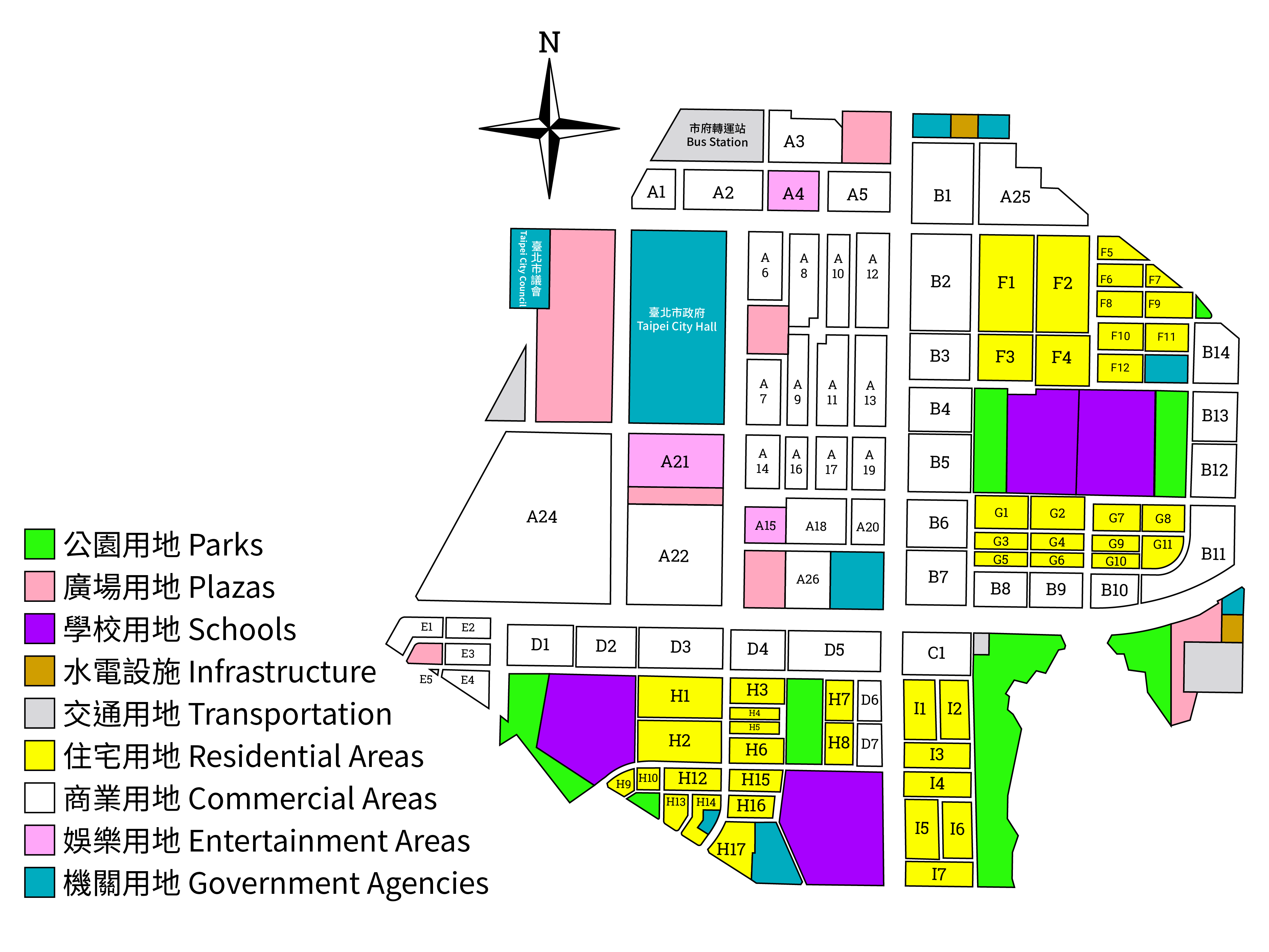
Xinyi Planning District core area map

Its historical development began in 1976, when the Taipei Municipal Government accepted the proposal to redevelop the area east of the Sun Yat-sen Memorial Hall. The goal of this redevelopment was to set up a secondary commercial center away from the more crowded old city center (Taipei Station, Ximending area). The redevelopment hoped to increase the prosperity of the eastern district and the convenience of urban life for existing residents.

The development framework was planned by the Japanese architect Kaku Morin (1920–2012) of Kaku Morin Group, an architect with planning experience with the Nishi-Shinjuku district, a previously planned development in Tokyo. The center's purpose was to expand business investment in the area and attract international financial services and technology firms. It also planned for residential development by building a completely new community. The Xinyi Planning District is the only commercial development area in Taipei with a wholly planned street and urban design. In addition to attracting corporations, it also features large retail spaces, department stores, and shopping malls.

There are currently 15 department stores in Xinyi Planning District, forming the Xinyi Commercial District. Department stores in the commercial district include Shin Kong Mitsukoshi Xinyi New Life Square (A4, A8, A9, and A11), Taipei 101 Mall, Vieshow Cinemas, ATT 4 FUN, Uni-President Hankyu Department Store, BELLAVITA, Eslite Bookstore, Breeze Xin Yi, Breeze Song Gao, Breeze Nan Shan, Neo19, and FEDS Xinyi A13. Taipei Sky Tower Mall is currently under construction and is scheduled to be completed in 2022. With at least 10 department stores in a mere 50-hectare site, Xinyi Commercial District is said to have the world's highest density of department stores.

== Main buildings ==
Block	Name	Floor	Height (m)	Floor Area (m^{2})	Status	Completed	Usage	Note
Station	Taipei City Hall Bus Station	31	151	144,037.15	Completed	2010	Commercial (Uni-President Hankyu Department Store); Hotel (W Taipei); Station (Bus and Taipei Metro)	
Government	Taipei City Hall	12	54.42	196,684.59	Completed	1994	Government	
Government	Taipei City Council	10	35	46,592.4	Completed	1990	Government	
A1	Farglory Financial Center	32	208	61,147.58	Completed	2012	Office	
A2	Uni-President International Tower	30	154	116,773.91	Completed	2004	Commercial (eslite Xinyi Store); Office	
A3	Cathay Landmark	46	212	152,488.6	Completed	2015	Commercial (Breeze Xin Yi); Office	
A4	Shin Kong Mitsukoshi	9	49	87,700	Completed	2005	Commercial (Part of Xinyi New Life Square)	
A5	BELLAVITA Shopping Center	9	49.98	52,636.11	Completed	2009	Commercial	
A6	Walsin Lihwa Building	27	134.6	77,824.15	Completed	2009	Office	
A7	The Sky Taipei	51	280	87,464.32	Under Construction	2025	Commercial (Taipei Sky Tower Mall); Hotel (Andaz Taipei, Park Hyatt Taipei); Auditorium	(Note: 原本為CTBC Financial Holding及CTBC Bank總行大樓和 新舞台，2014年5月中信金總部遷至南港區中國信託金融園區後，於2015年10月以151億新台幣售出95%土地所有權持分，由買方負責拆除，且需重建新舞台。)
A8	Shin Kong Mitsukoshi	9	39.55	67,901.18	Completed	2001	Commercial (Part of Xinyi New Life Square)	
A9	Shin Kong Mitsukoshi	9	47.1	51,854.9	Completed	2003	Commercial (Part of Xinyi New Life Square)	
A10	Humble House Taipei	22	89.95	54,956.28	Completed	2013	Commercial (Breeze Song Gao); Hotel	
A11	Shin Kong Mitsukoshi	7	40.7	62,705.81	Completed	1997	Commercial (Part of Xinyi New Life Square)	
A12	Shin Kong Xinyi Financial Center	22	89.95	79,689.79	Completed	2010	Hotel (Le Méridien Taipei); Office	
A13	FEDS Xinyi A13	14	78.95	78,159.78	Completed	2019	Commercial (Far Eastern Xinyi A13 Department Store, Apple Xinyi A13)	
A14	ATT 4 FUN	10	42	33,065.65	Completed	2000	Commercial	
A15, 18, 20	Taipei Nan Shan Plaza	48	272	192,154.99	Completed	2018	Commercial (Breeze Nan Shan); Office	(Note: Originally the World Trade Center II, the building was demolished in 2013 after Nan Shan Life acquired the 50-year right of superficies in 2012.)
A16	Vieshow Cinemas	3	21.15	10,944.2	Completed	1997	Commercial	
A17	Vieshow Cinemas	4	27.9	20,674.15	Completed	1997	Commercial	
A19	Neo19	12	43.9	24,380.69	Completed	2001	Commercial	
A21	Nanshan Xinyi A21	43	232.7	141,528.55	Under construction	2028	Office; Commercial	
A22, A23	Taipei 101	101	509.2	374,219.95	Completed	2004	Commercial (Taipei 101 Mall); Office	
A24	Taipei World Trade Center (Exhibition Building/Hall 1)	8	41	157,642.34	Completed	1986	Exhibition	
A24	TWTC International Trade Building	34	142.92	111,791.52	Completed	1988	Office	
A24	Taipei International Convention Center	10	48.95	59,997.45	Completed	1989	Exhibition	
A24	Grand Hyatt Taipei	26	85.2	118,505.52	Completed	1990	Hotel	
A25	Fubon Xinyi A25	54	266.3	132,362.85	Completed	2022	Office; Art Museum	
A26	Nanshan Xinyi A26 (Set for Urban Renewal)	30	153.3	83,099.28	Under Construction	2026	Office	
B1	CPC Building	23	90	102,920.4	Completed	2001	Office	
B2	Cathay Financial Center	24	106.15	89,902.76	Completed	2002	Office	
B3	Hontai Trade Plaza	18	81.75	52,801.35	Completed	1999	Office	
B4	Capital Financial Center	18	73.5	52,938.29	Completed	1998	Office	
B5	Kelti Group Headquarters	15	89.5	28,823.85	Completed	2009	Office	
B6	Hua Nan Bank Headquarters	27	154.5	52,131.74	Completed	2014	Office	
B7	55 Timeless	31	127.23	25,931.47	Completed	2018	Residential	
D1	Rosewood Taipei	37	144.9	40,329.37	Under Construction	2024	Hotel; Residential	
D3	Four Seasons Hotel Taipei	31	180.2	27,512	Under Construction	2025	Hotel	
D4	Sinyi Realty Building	10	48.2	22,771.09	Completed	1995	Office	
D5	Cathay Xinyi Building	12	49.95	47,088.36	Completed	2003	Office	
E1	Aurora Plaza Taipei	18	72.75	33,747.71	Completed	1991	Office	
E2	Shin Kong Manhattan Building	16	66.25	23,208.43	Completed	2000	Office	
E4	NanShan Financial Center	17	69.95	27,559.93	Completed	2006	Office	
H	Tao Zhu Yin Yuan / Agora Garden	21	93.2	42,705.61	Completed	2018	Residential	

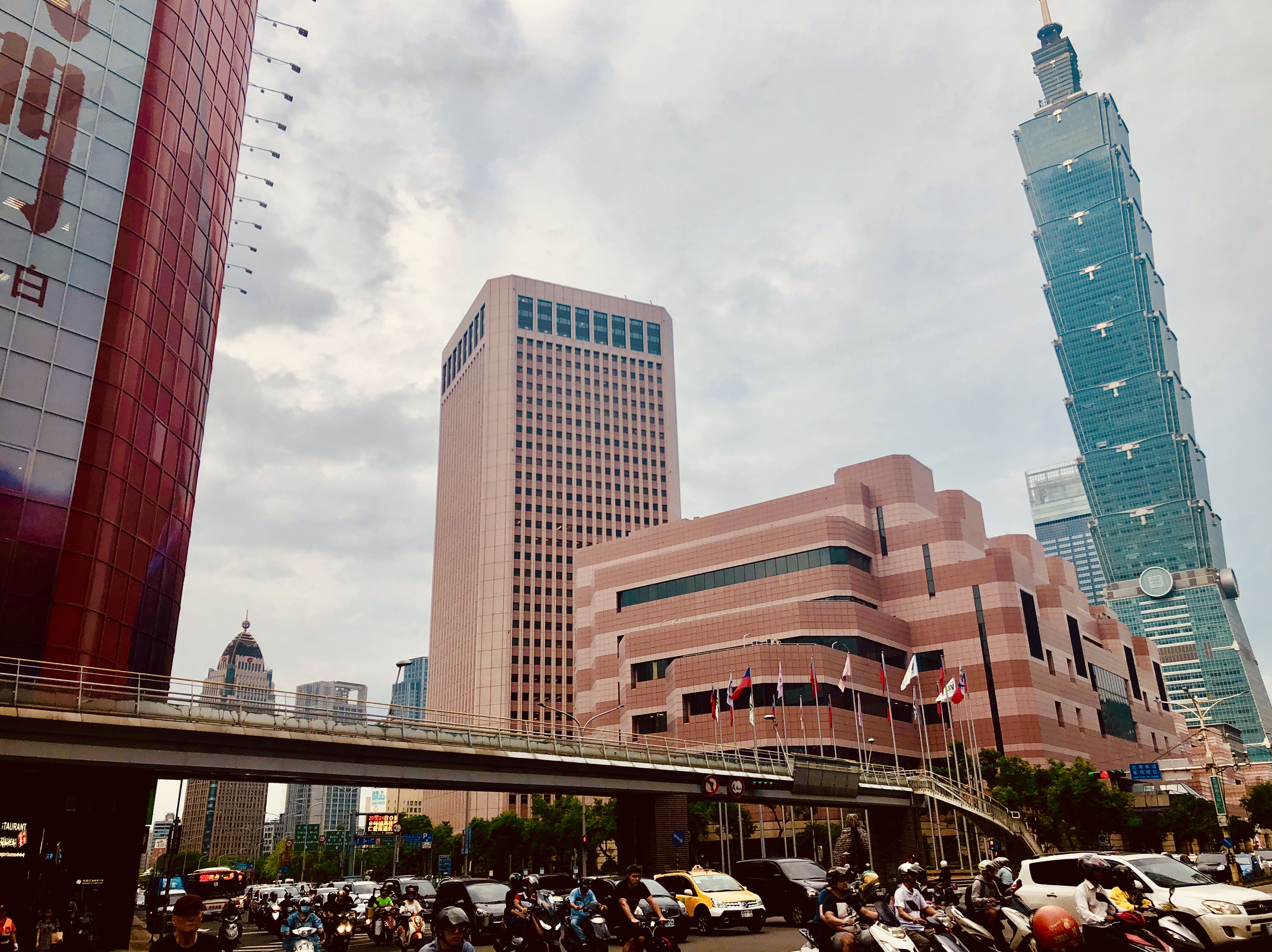
Xinyi Planning District Skyline featuring Taipei 101, Taipei Nan Shan Plaza, TWTC International Trade Building, Farglory Financial Center and Taipei World Trade Center

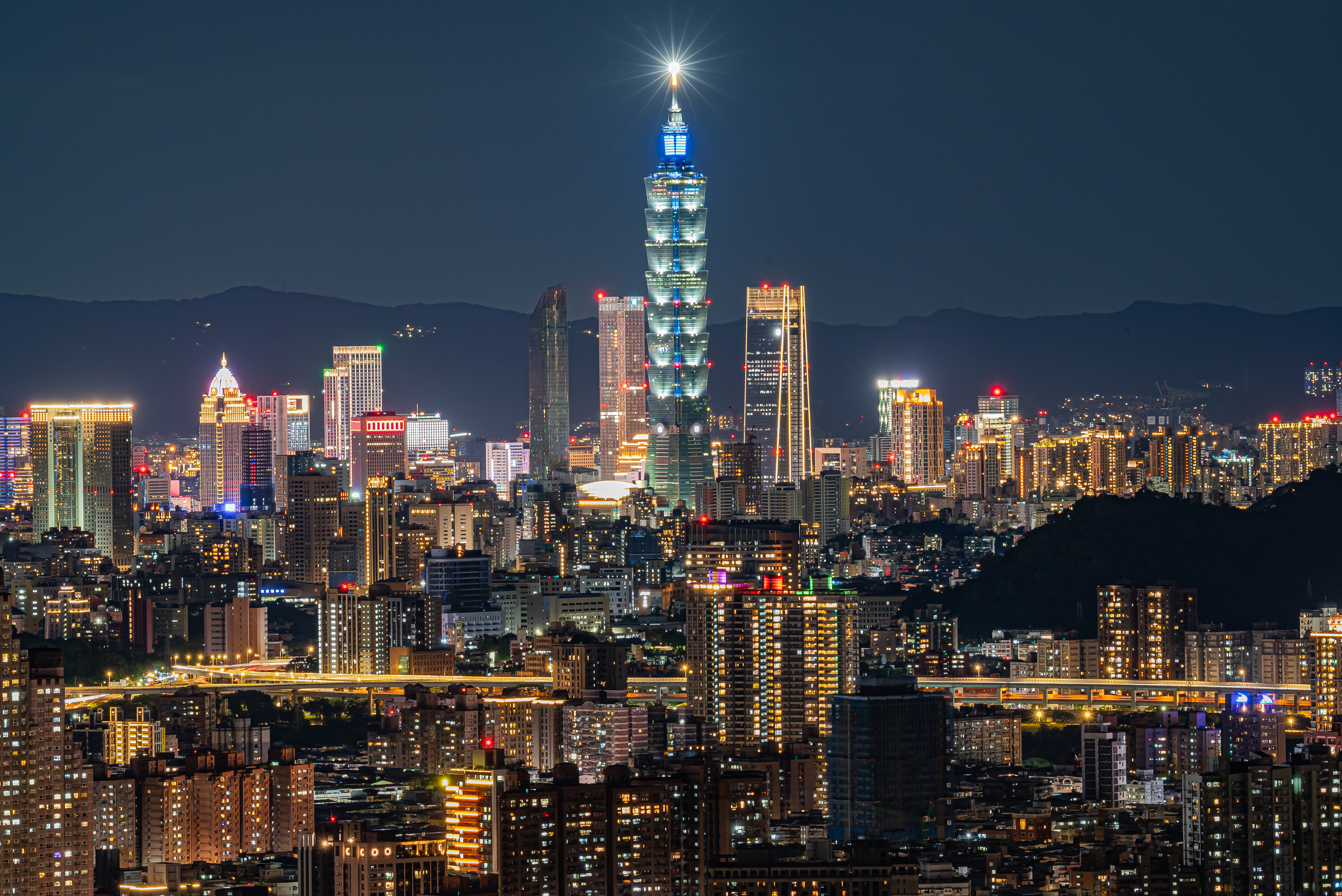
Xinyi District night view

== Transportation ==
=== Rail ===
- Metro
  - Taipei Metro
    - Tamsui–Xinyi line: Taipei 101 / World Trade Center Station, Xiangshan Station
    - Songshan–Xindian line: Songshan station
    - Bannan line:Taipei City Hall Station, Yongchun Station
- Taiwan Railway
  - Taiwan Trunk Line: Songshan station

=== Road ===
- Xinyi Expressway
- Civic Boulevard
- HuanDong Boulevard

== See also ==
- Xinyi Skyway System
- Eastern District of Taipei
- Urban planning
- Xinban Special District
- Xinzhuang Sub-city Center
