= Eastern District of Taipei =

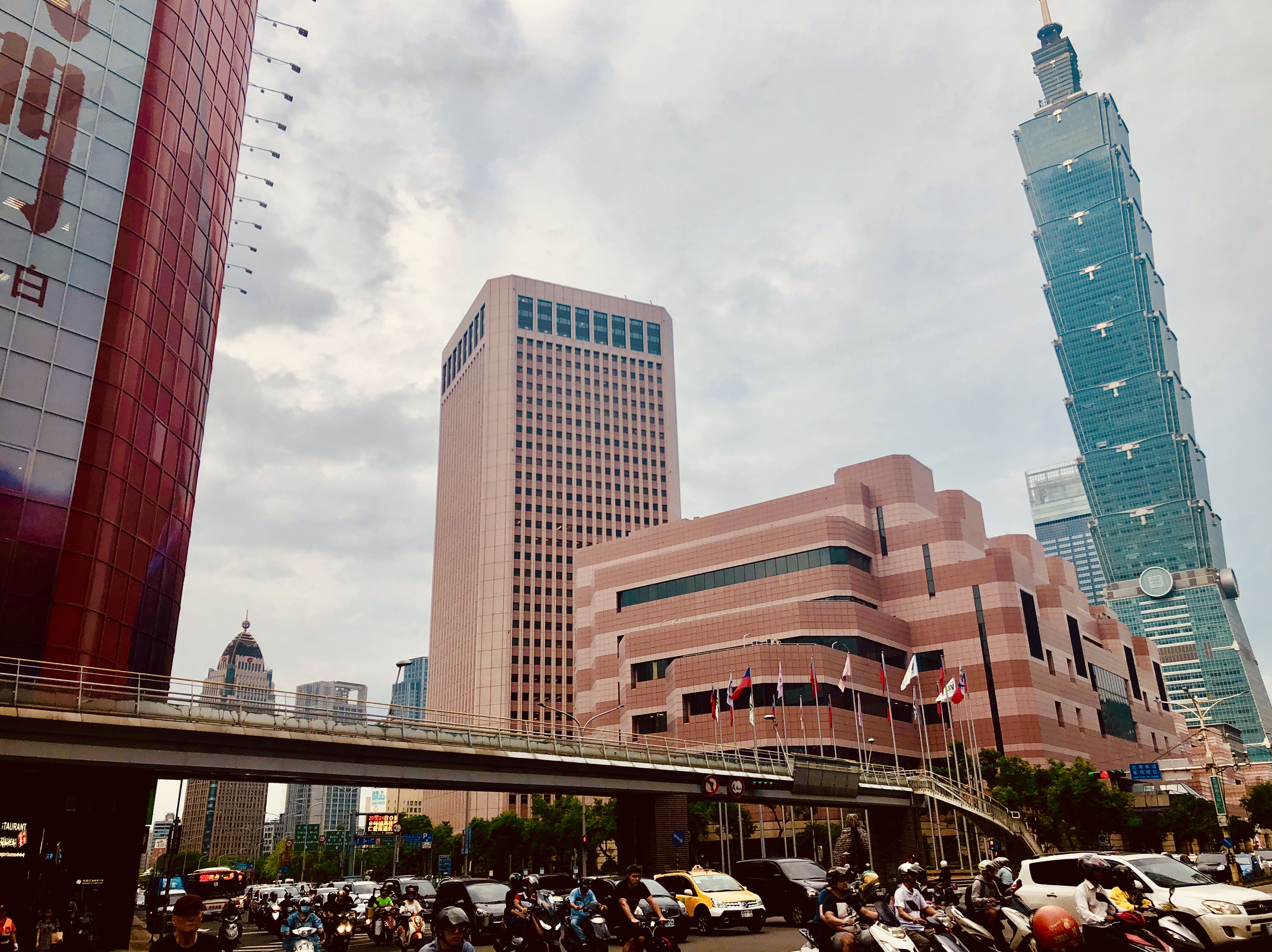
Xinyi Special District skyline featuring Taipei 101, Taipei Nan Shan Plaza, TWTC International Trade Building, Farglory Financial Center and Taipei World Trade Center

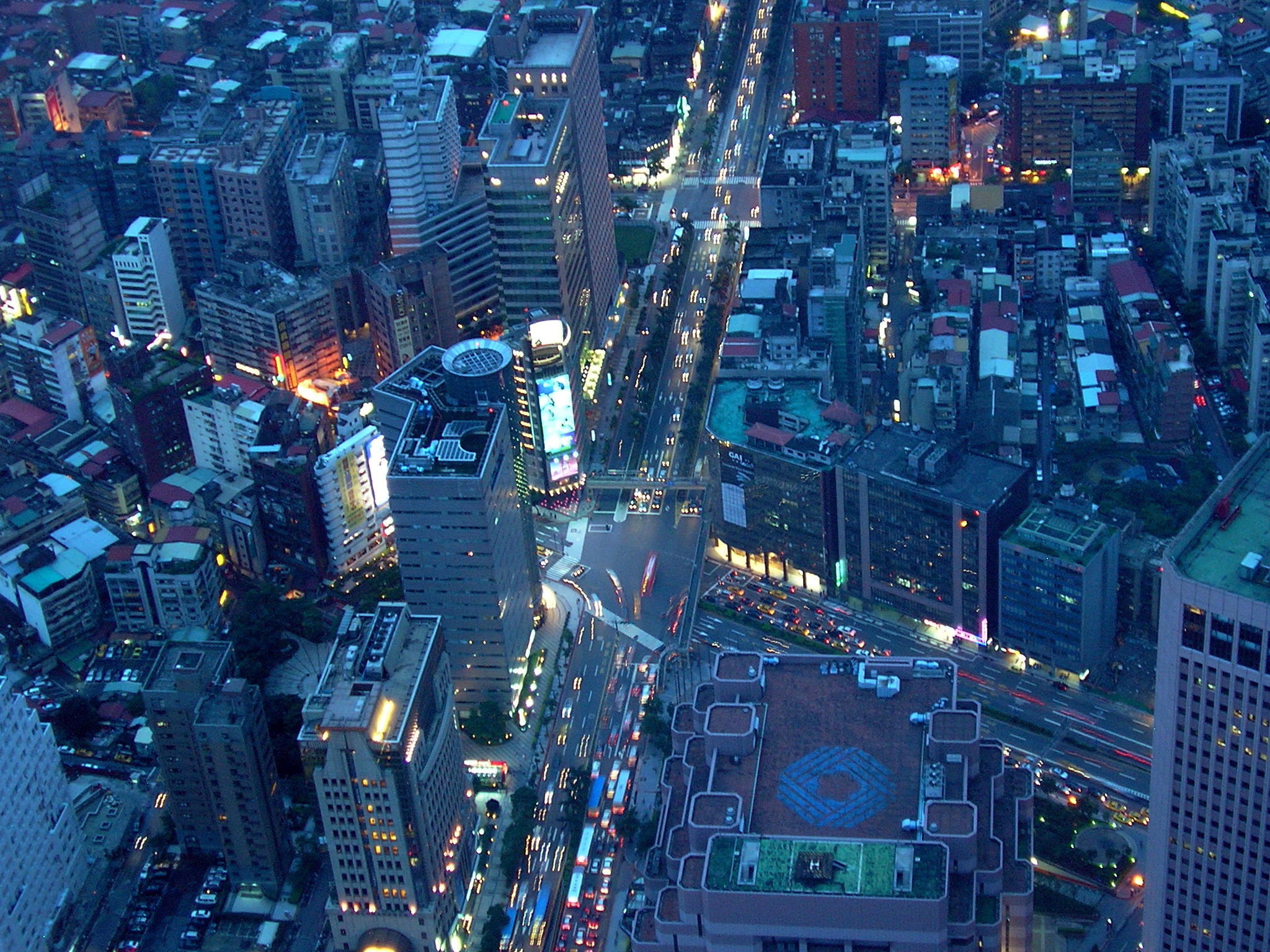
Xinyi District night view from Taipei 101

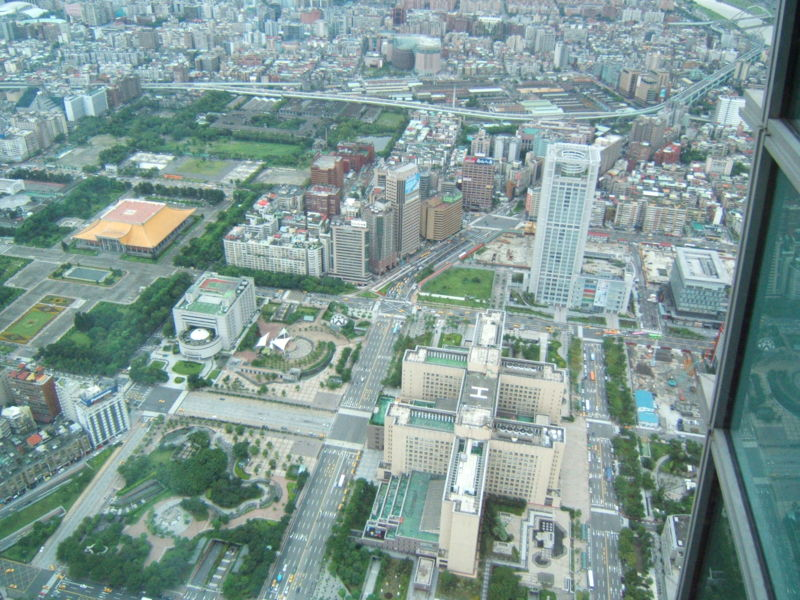
Taipei Eastern District bird's-eye view

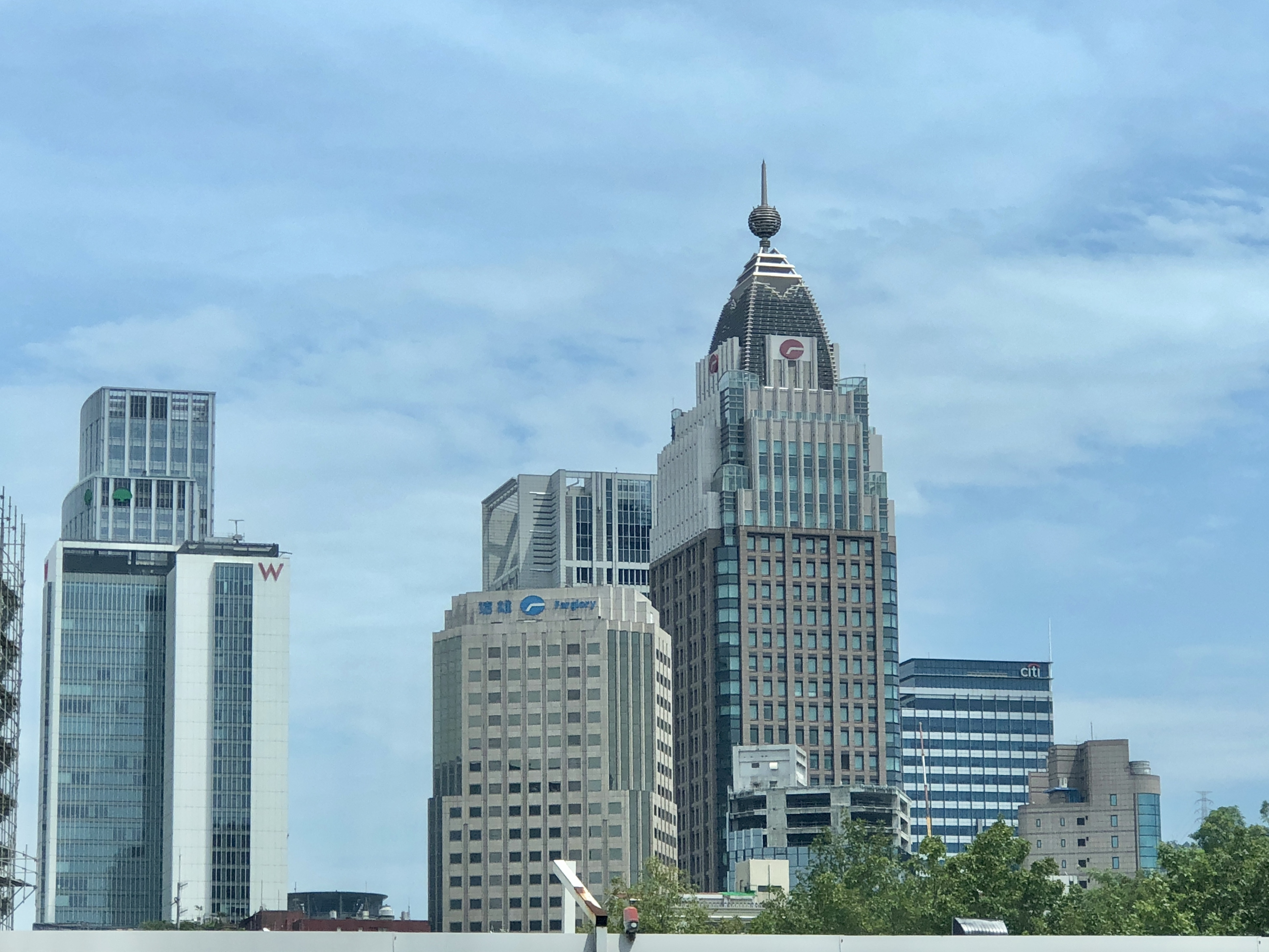
Cluster of skyscrapers in Eastern District

The Eastern District of Taipei (Chinese: 臺北東區) refers to the newly developed area in eastern Taipei, Taiwan. In its broadest sense, the Eastern District of Taipei is the whole region east of Fuxing South Road. In general, however, the Eastern District refers to the area between Civic Boulevard and Xinyi Road, including most part of Daan District, Xinyi District and Songshan District, the administrative districts in eastern Taipei. With a plethora of business buildings, department stores and shopping districts, the Eastern District has now become one of the most cosmopolitan parts of Taipei. Taipei City Hall, Taipei City Council and Taipei 101 are all located in this district.

== Eastern District vs. Western District ==
Historically, the Eastern District was not the downtown area of Taipei City. The area was largely wilderness under the rule of the Qing dynasty and Japanese. The development of Zhongxiao East Road after the 1960s and the development of the Taipei Metro led to the rapid transformation of the Eastern District into a major central business district of not only Taipei, but the whole of Taiwan, much like the areas in front of Taipei Main Station and Ximending, back in their prime.

In contrast to the Eastern District, which is the present-day financial district of Taipei, the Western District primarily consists of administrative buildings for the Central Government.

== Development ==
The rise of the Eastern District as the business district of Taipei only occurred in the last decade. The development of Taipei during the Qing dynasty was limited to the area of Taipei Prefecture (bordered by Zhonghua Rd., Zhongshan S. Rd., Aiguo W. Rd. and Zhongxiao W. Rd.). During Japanese rule, the development of a downtown was only extended eastward to the Horikawa Drainage Channel (present day Xinsheng Road).

The situation changed in the early 1940s when the Kuomintang retreated to Taiwan with 2 million people. After that, because many colleges and universities were located in Taipei City and its suburbs, people from central or southern Taiwan came to Taipei to study or work. These factors lead to a sharp increase in population, causing overpopulation in the Western District. Furthermore, the Tamsui River hindered the expansion of Taipei City to develop in a westerly direction. These factors resulted in the development of Eastern District.

When jurisdiction of Taipei City changed to the central government in 1967, in order to allow mass development of the city, the city government launched the first four-year public construction project and constructed the main thoroughfares to the suburbs. Zhongxiao E. Rd. was the main thoroughfare leading to the Eastern District. The construction of Zhongxiao E. Rd. Sections 3 and onward led to the rise of the Eastern District developments. These factors led to the Eastern District overtaking the Western District as the new business center of Taipei. The development of the Xinyi Planned District and the opening of the MRT Wenshan Line and MRT Nangang Line rapidly boosted the development of the Eastern District.
