= CPC Building =

High-rise office building in Xinyi District, Taipei, Taiwan

- 中油大樓
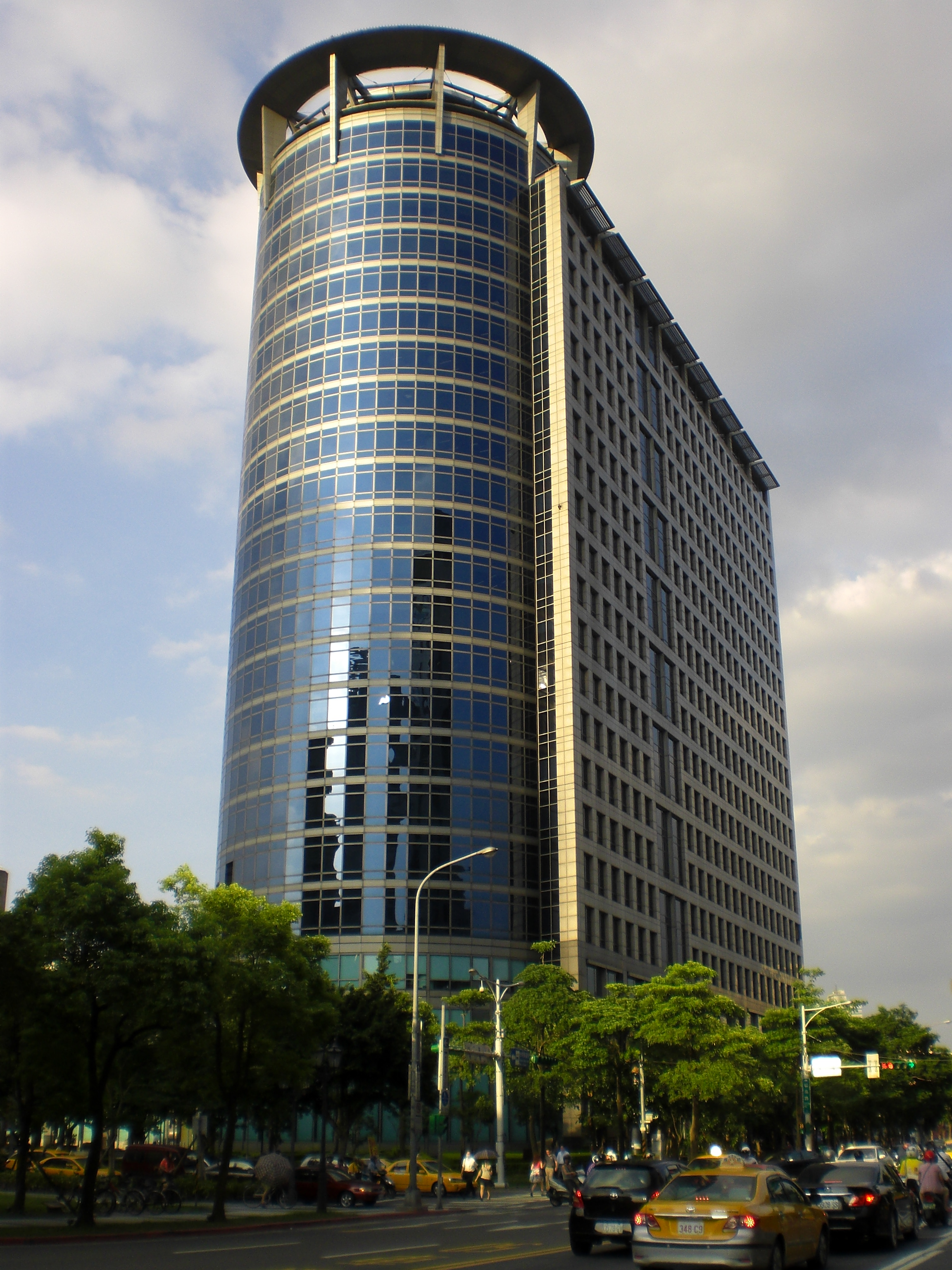
- Interactive map of the CPC Building area

General information
- Status: Completed
- Type: Office
- Location: No. 3, Songren Road, Xinyi District, Taipei, Taiwan
- Coordinates: 25°02′22.4″N 121°34′09″E
- Completed: 2002

Height
- Roof: 99 m (325 ft)

Technical details
- Floor count: 23
- Floor area: 102,920.4 m^{2} (1,107,826 sq ft)

The CPC Building, also known as Chinese Petroleum Building (Chinese: 中油大樓) is a 23-storey, 99 m (325 ft) high-rise office building completed in 2002 and located in Xinyi Special District, Taipei, Taiwan. The building is owned by the CPC Corporation and serves as its corporate headquarters with a total floor area of 102,920.4 m^{2} (1,107,826 sq ft).

== See also ==
- Taipei Century Plaza
- Shin Kong Manhattan Building
- Xinyi Special District
