= Le Méridien Taipei =

Hotel in Xinyi, Taipei, Taiwan

Le Méridien Taipei 台北寒舍艾美酒店
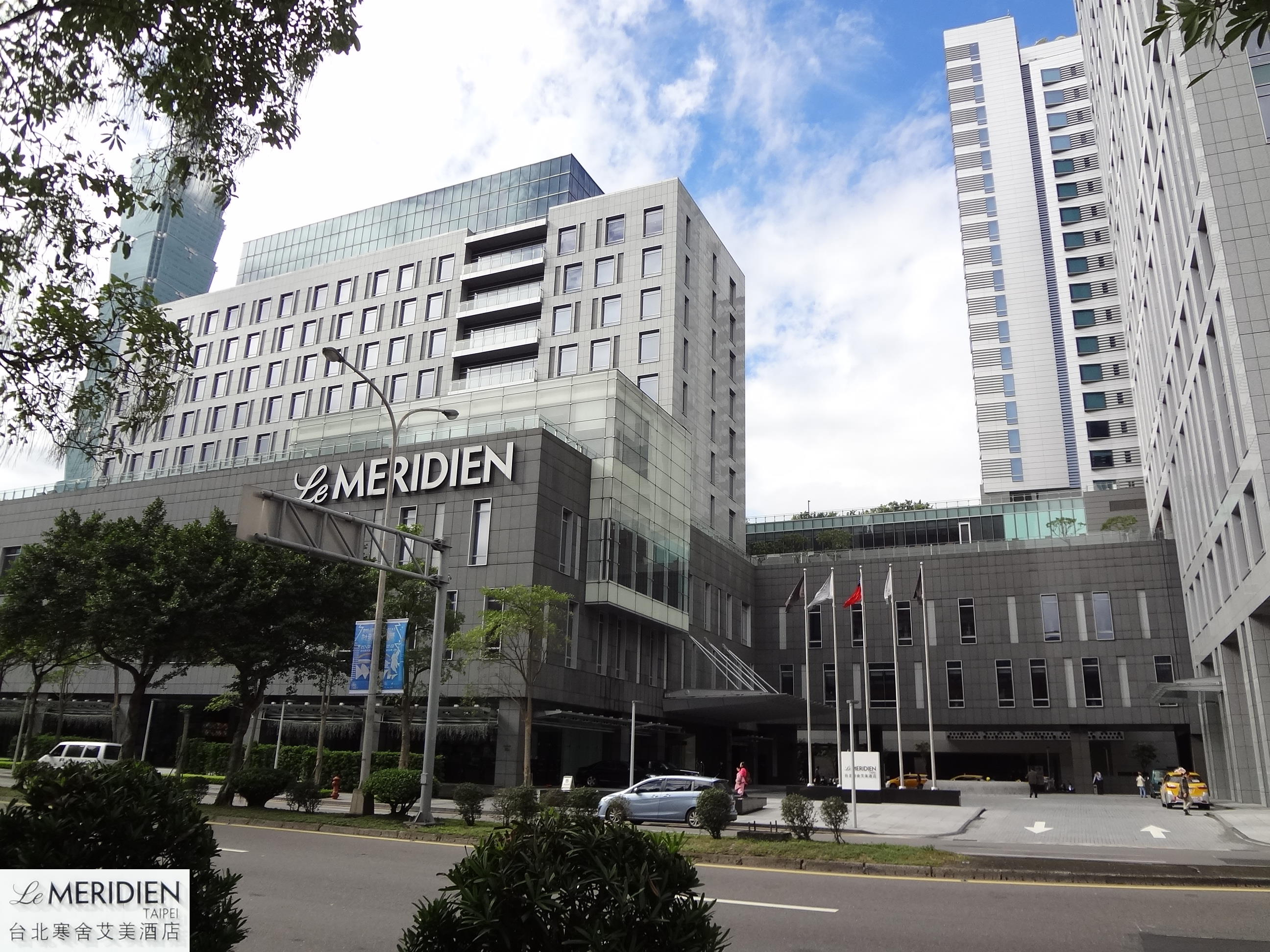
- Interactive map of Le Méridien Taipei 台北寒舍艾美酒店

General information
- Type: Hotel
- Location: No. 38, Songren Road, Xinyi District, Taipei, Taiwan
- Coordinates: 25.03836523409808°N 121.56802937057367°E
- Completed: 2010

Height
- Architectural: 99 m (325 ft)

Technical details
- Floor count: 21
- Floor area: 79,689.79 m^{2} (857,773.8 sq ft)

Le Méridien Taipei (Chinese: 台北寒舍艾美酒店) is a 21-storey, 99 m (325 ft) skyscraper hotel completed in 2010 in Xinyi Special District, Taipei, Taiwan. Managed by Le Méridien, the hotel is one of the top luxury hotels in Taipei.

== Facilities ==
The five-star hotel has a total of 160 rooms including premium suites, themed restaurants, a café and a bar. Other facilities include a fitness centre, sauna room, an indoor heated swimming pool, as well as eight event rooms with 14,563 sq ft (1,352.9 m^{2}) of event space and a maximum capacity of 800 people.

=== Restaurants & Bars ===
- Latest Recipe: Restaurant serving a wide variety of both international and local flavors.
- My Humble House: Chinese restaurant featuring traditional Taiwanese and Cantonese cuisine.
- Latitude 25: Lobby lounge café offering hot beverages.
- Chocoart: Patisserie offering a selection of desserts that blend chocolate and western desserts with traditional Taiwanese delicacies, including chocolate pineapple cakes and taro macarons.
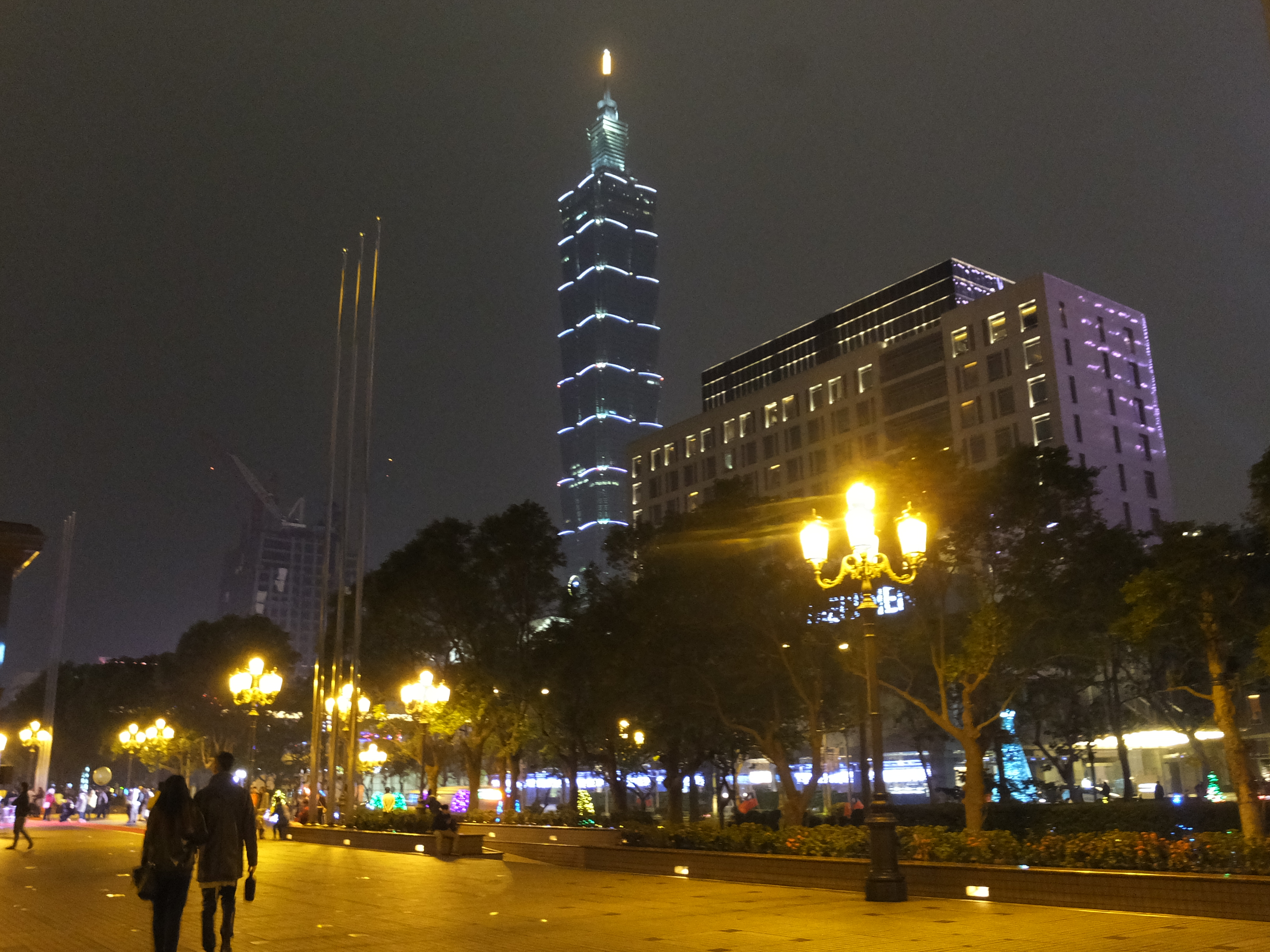
Exterior views at night from Songren Road

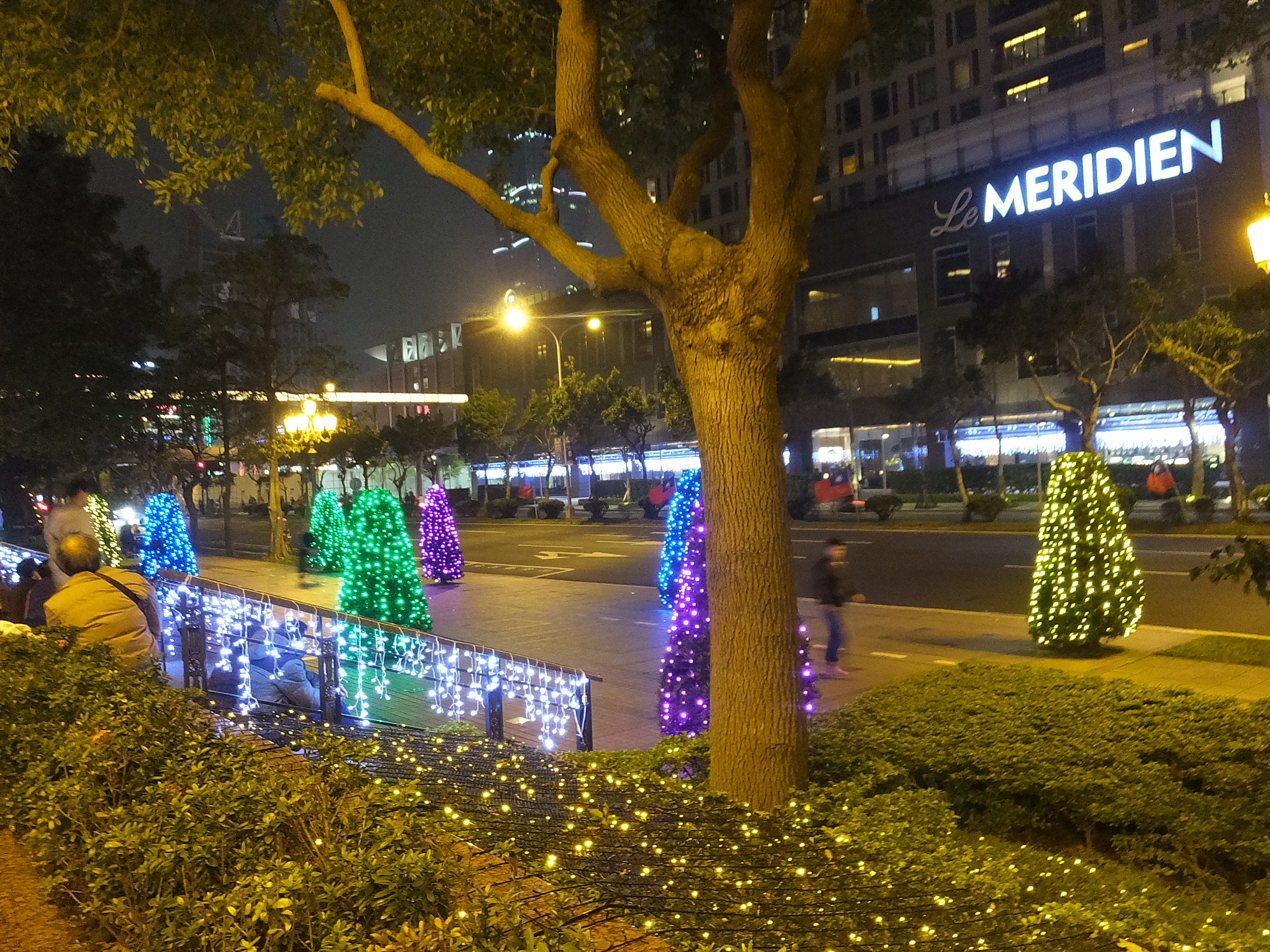

== See also ==
- Xinyi Special District
- Grand Mayfull Hotel Taipei
- Grand Hyatt Taipei
