= Fubon Life Tower =

Skyscraper in Taipei, Taiwan

Fubon Life Tower 富邦人壽大樓
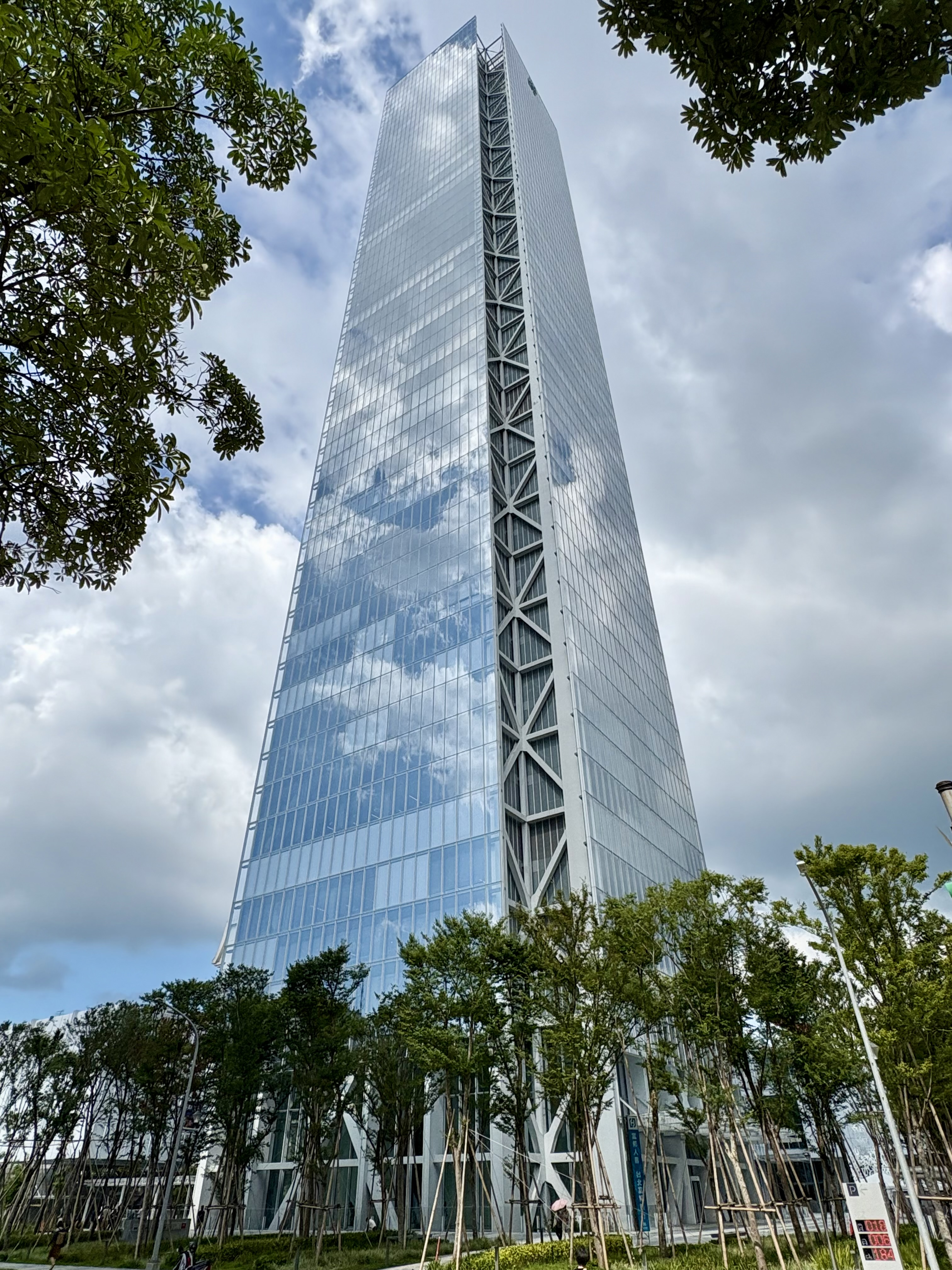
- Interactive map of the Fubon Life Tower 富邦人壽大樓 area

General information
- Status: Completed
- Type: Office building, Art museum
- Location: Xinyi Special District, Xinyi, Taipei, Taiwan
- Coordinates: 25°2′21″N 121°34′12″E
- Completed: 2022

Height
- Roof: 266.3 m (874 ft)

Technical details
- Floor count: 56
- Floor area: 132,362.85 m^{2} (1,424,741.9 sq ft)

Design and construction
- Architect: Renzo Piano

The Fubon Life Tower (Chinese: 富邦人壽大樓) is a skyscraper located in Xinyi Special District, Xinyi District, Taipei, Taiwan. It is the third-tallest building in Taipei, and the fifth-tallest in Taiwan. Designed by Renzo Piano, the building is 266.3 m (874 ft) tall, the floor area is 132,362.85 m^{2} (1,424,741.9 sq ft), and it comprises 56 floors above ground, as well as 4 basement levels. It was completed in 2022 as the headquarter of Fubon Financial Holding Co.

== Design ==
With almost 100,000 m^{2} (1,100,000 sq ft) above ground and 4 levels of basement, the Fubon project consists of three buildings within a landscaped, shaded urban realm. The central 56-story, 266.3 m (874 ft) high tower of 92,000 m^{2} (990,000 sq ft) (GFA) will accommodate high-end offices and at its rooftop a garden events space with views of Taipei. To the east of the Tower, the 3-floor high Fubon Museum includes over 2,000m^{2} of contemporary and modern art galleries. To the north of the Tower, lies the Pavilion of 1,970 m^{2} (21,200 sq ft), accommodating retail and services for the entire complex. More than 150 trees will be planted in the landscaped garden, offering the public a shaded environment in a sub-tropical climate. North of the site, a park will be created to give the surrounding residential area a neighborhood park.

The slender tower has a rational floor plate size of 1,650 m^{2} (17,800 sq ft) and a good floor efficiency of up to 73.5%. The floor plate with floor to floor heights of 4.2 m (14 ft) allows good layouts for the offices, with a depth ratio that ensures quality daylighting levels in the office work place.

The square shape with cut-back notch corners employs an efficient steel structure. Perimeter bracing combined with a secondary moment frame structure provides a robust and efficient structural system to resist lateral seismic and typhoon wind loads.

The façades will be made of low-iron extra white glass with a neutral colored solar control coating to give the tower a crystalline appearance. The façade cavity system will include cavity blinds and will ensure good solar control, daylight levels and thermal comfort and performance. The project is committed to obtain the Taiwanese Green Building Certification (EEWH), with the objective of achieving the Gold level.

== Gallery ==
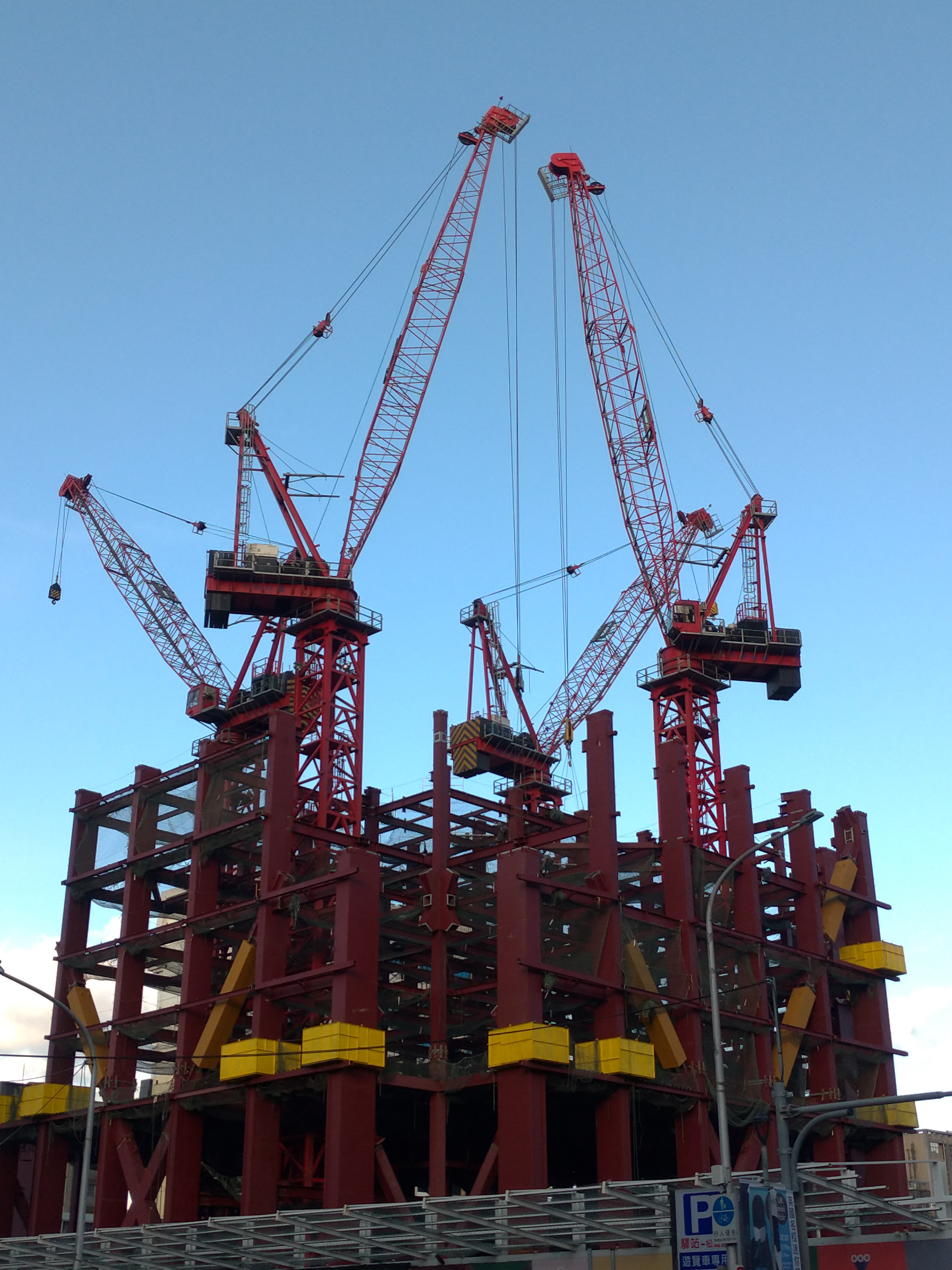
January 2020

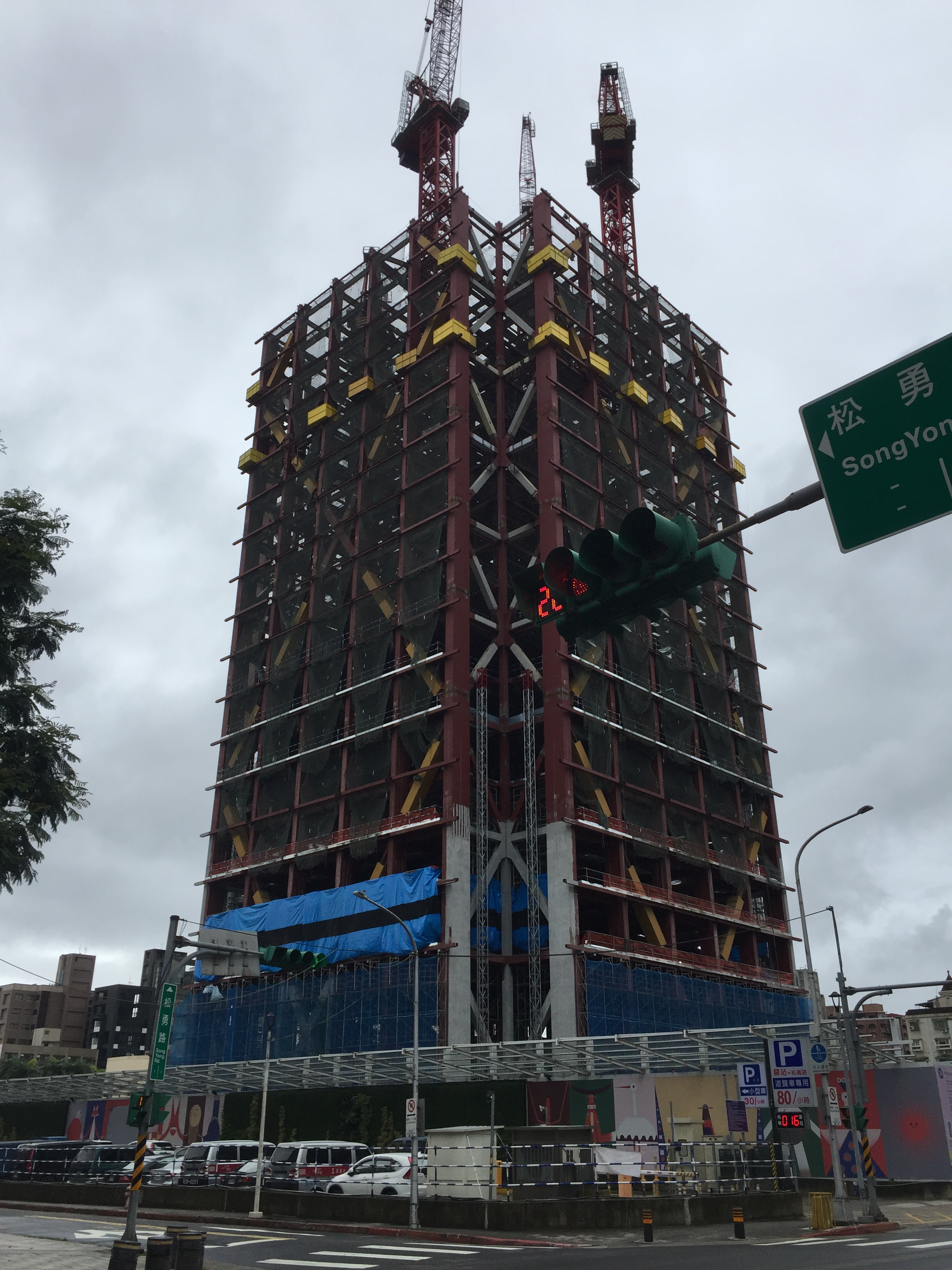
May 2020

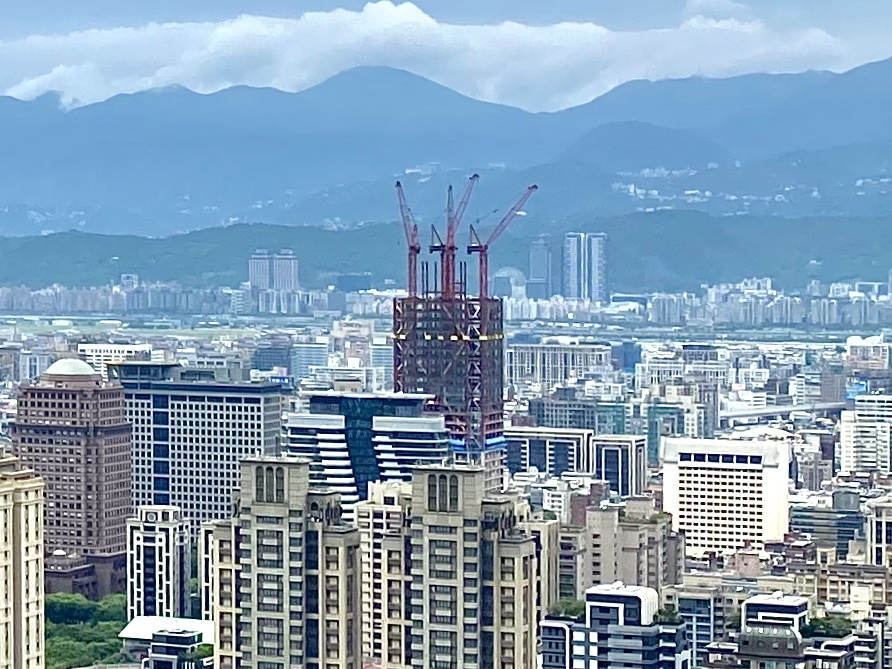
August 2020

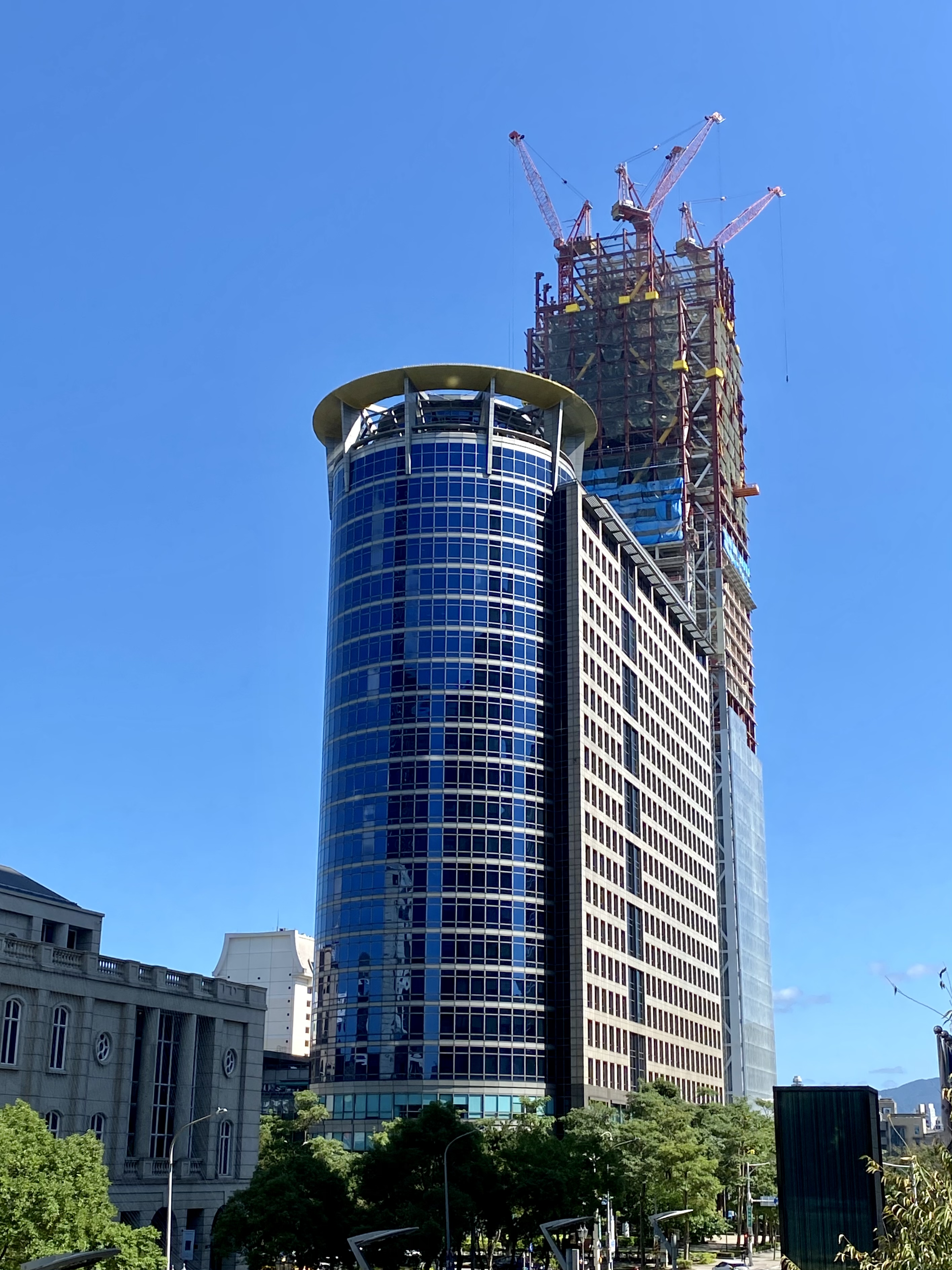
November 2020

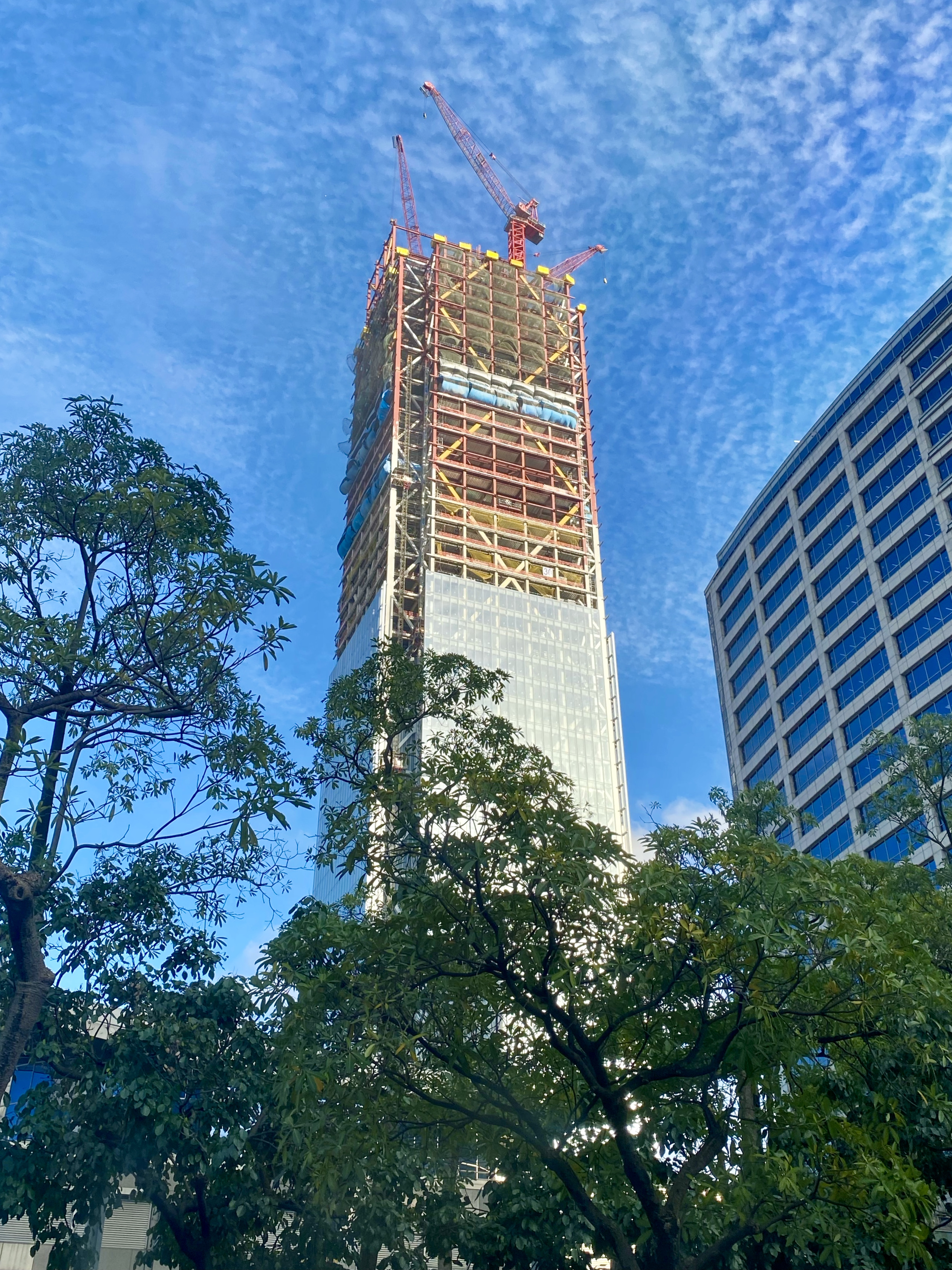
January 2021

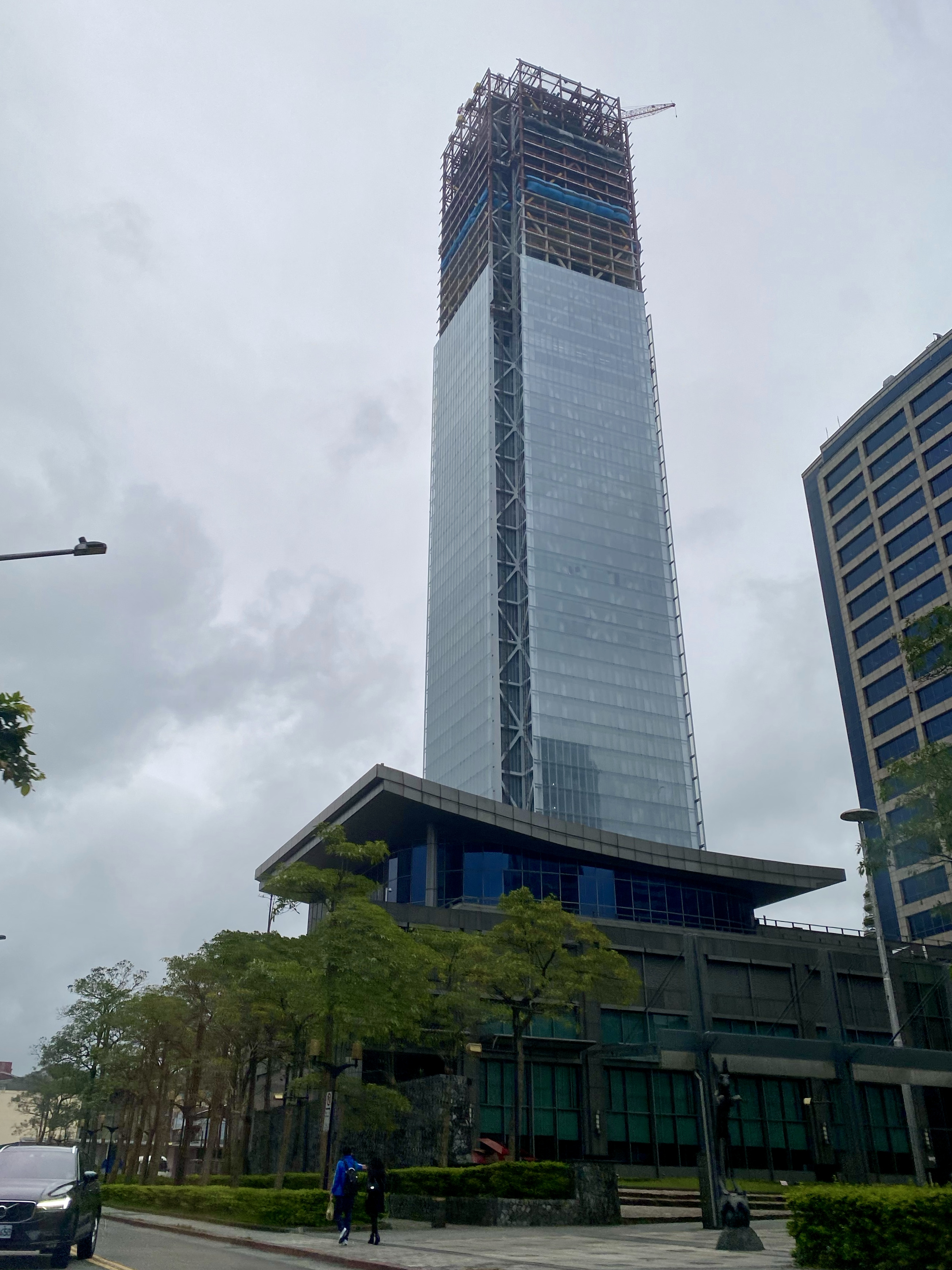
April 2021

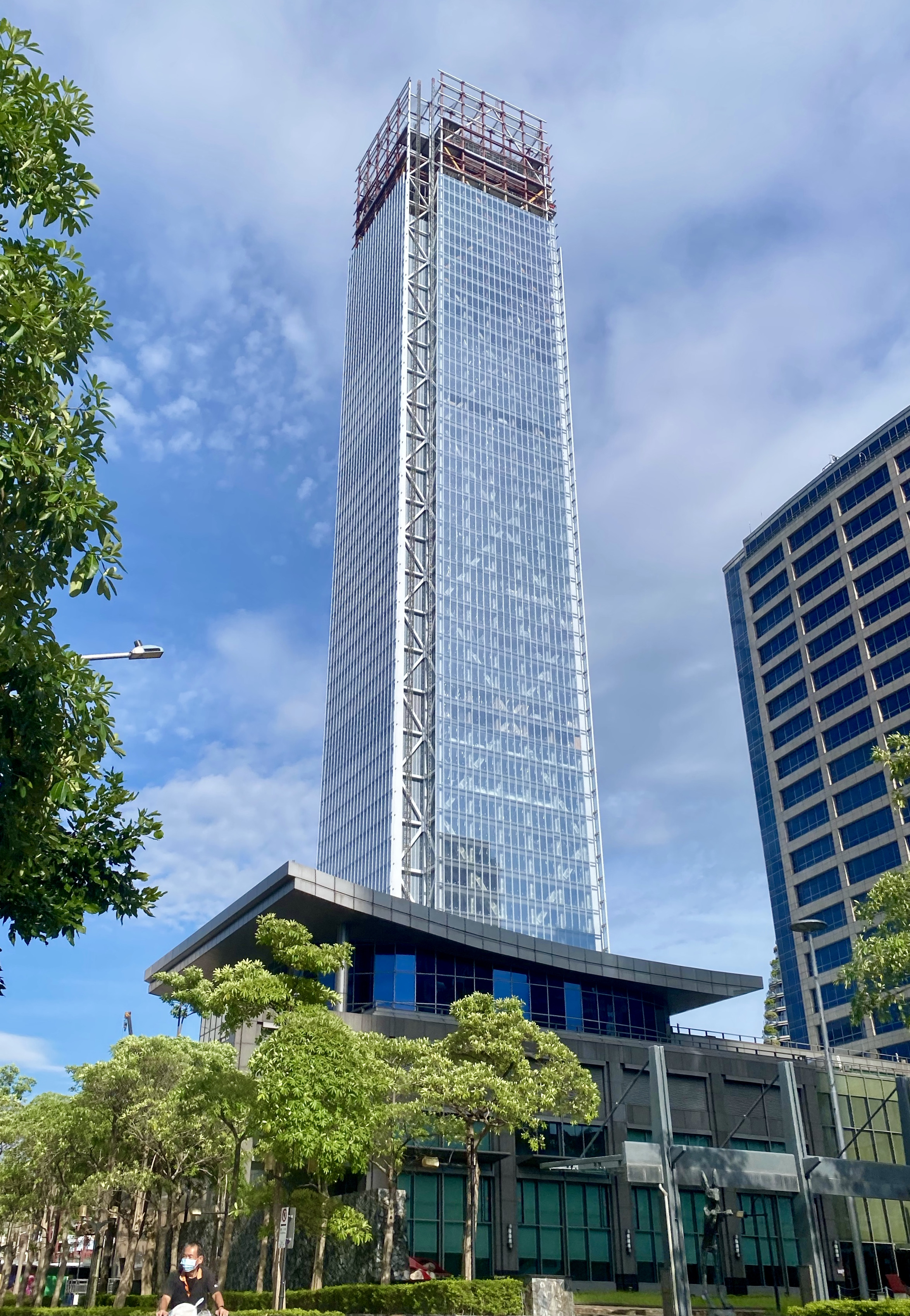
July 2021

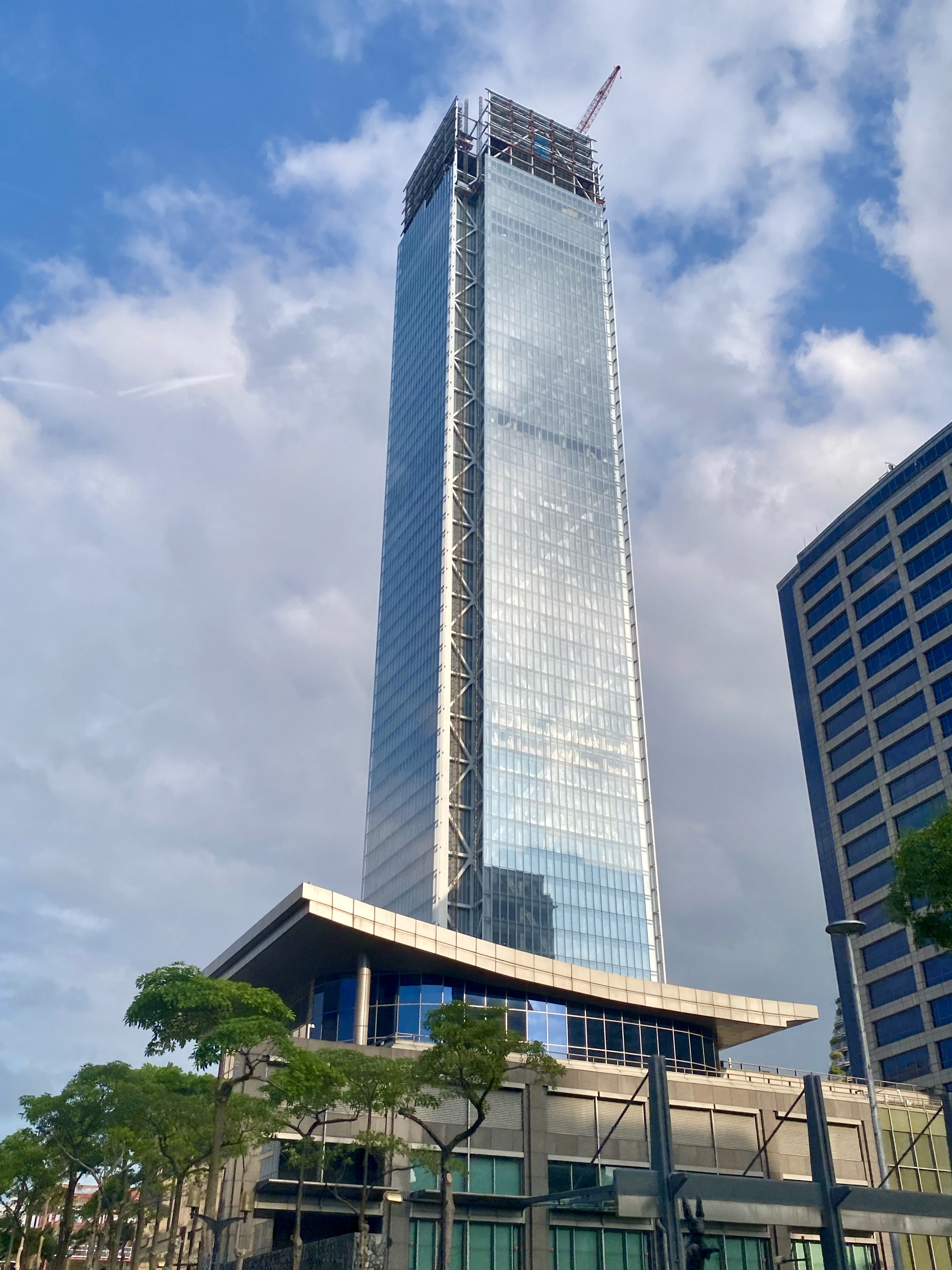
September 2021

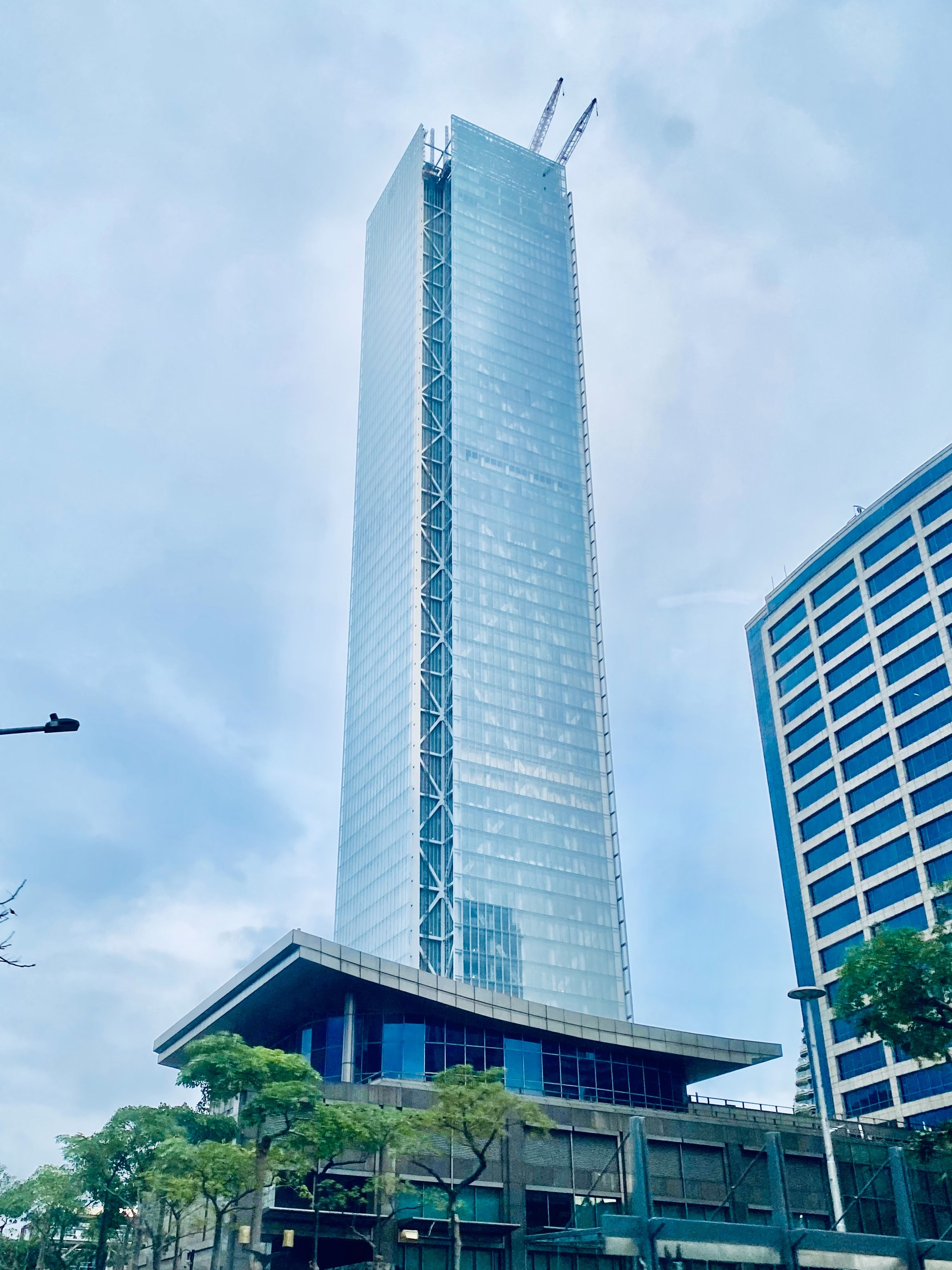
December 2021

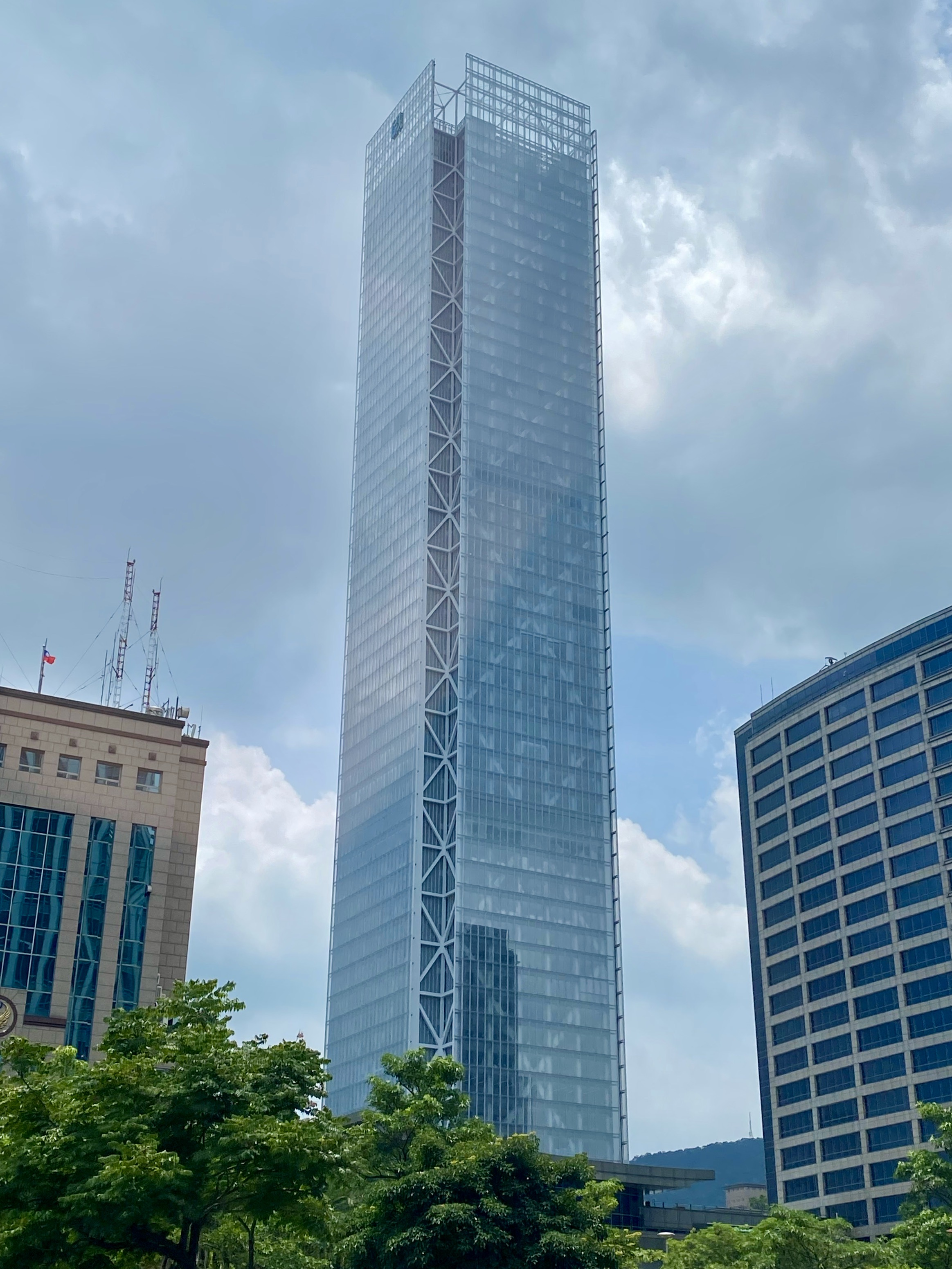
July 2022

== See also ==
- List of tallest buildings in Taiwan
- List of tallest buildings in Taipei
- Taipei 101
- Shin Kong Life Tower
- Taipei Sky Tower
