= A19 (Xinyi) =

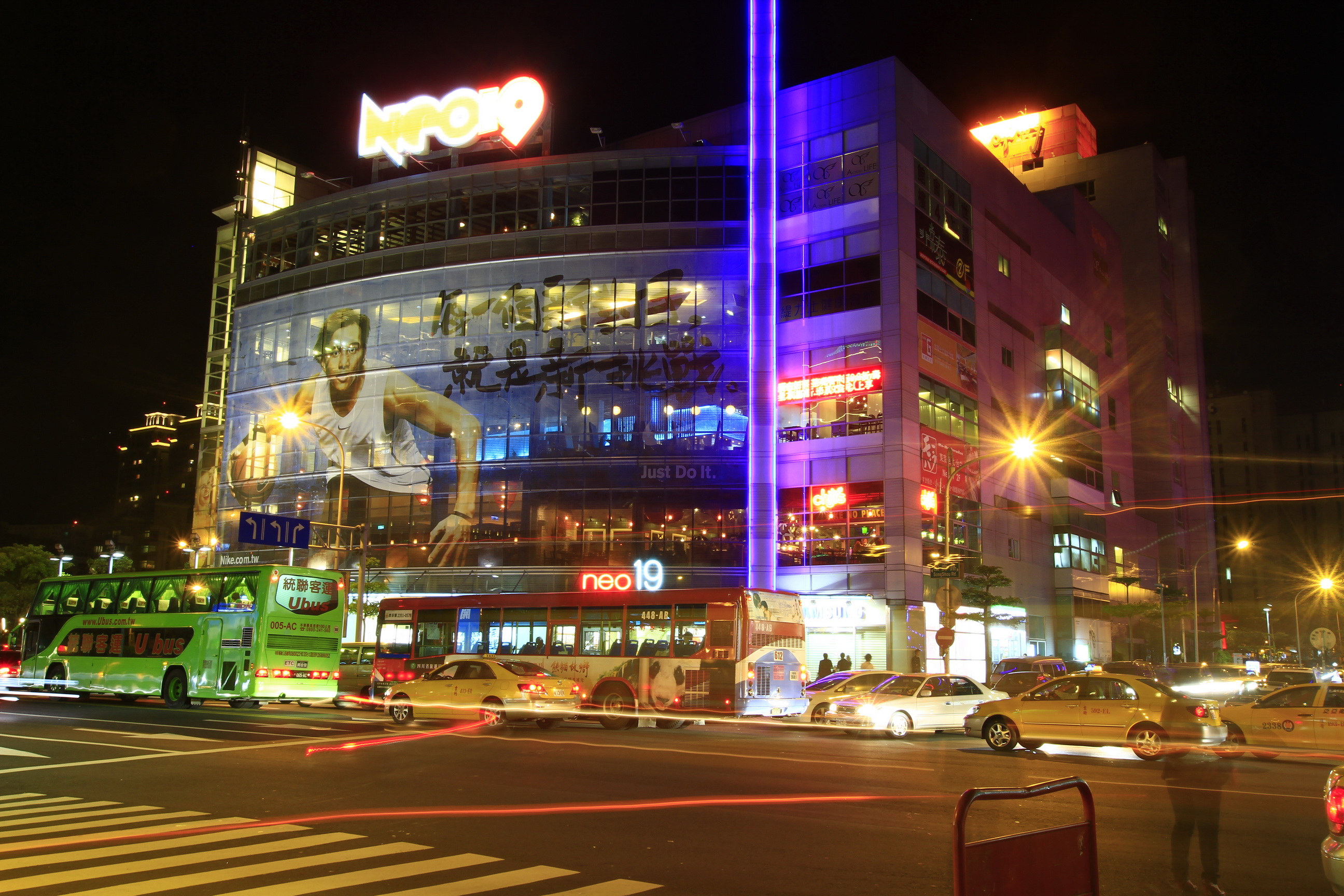
- Location: No. 22, Songshou Road, Xinyi District, Taipei, Taiwan
- Coordinates: 25.03548°N 121.56600°E
- Opened: 27 October 2001
- Floors: 5 floors above ground 1 floors below ground
- Public transit: Taipei 101–World Trade Center metro station
- Website: http://www.neo19.com.tw/

A19, formerly Neo19 is a shopping mall in Xinyi Special District, Taipei, Taiwan that opened on 27 October 2001. Main core stores of the shopping mall include shops, restaurants, nightclubs and a gym. The Nike store is located on the first floor, while the American chain restaurant Chili's is on the second floor along with VeryThai, Mo-Mo-Paradise and Mala-1 Hot Pot. Fitness Factory is located on the fourth floor. Ikon, Huckleberry, and Klash nightclubs are all located in B1 and the fifth floor houses another nightclub called Cocco & Co and bar called Barcode.

== Incidents ==
On 13 May 2021, A19 closed down for disinfection when the Taiwan Centers for Disease Control announced that a person who had tested positive for COVID-19 had visited and dined in a barbecue restaurant inside the shopping mall.

== See also ==
- List of tourist attractions in Taiwan
- List of shopping malls in Taipei
