= Bellavita =

Shopping mall in Xinyi, Taipei, Taiwan

- 寶麗廣場

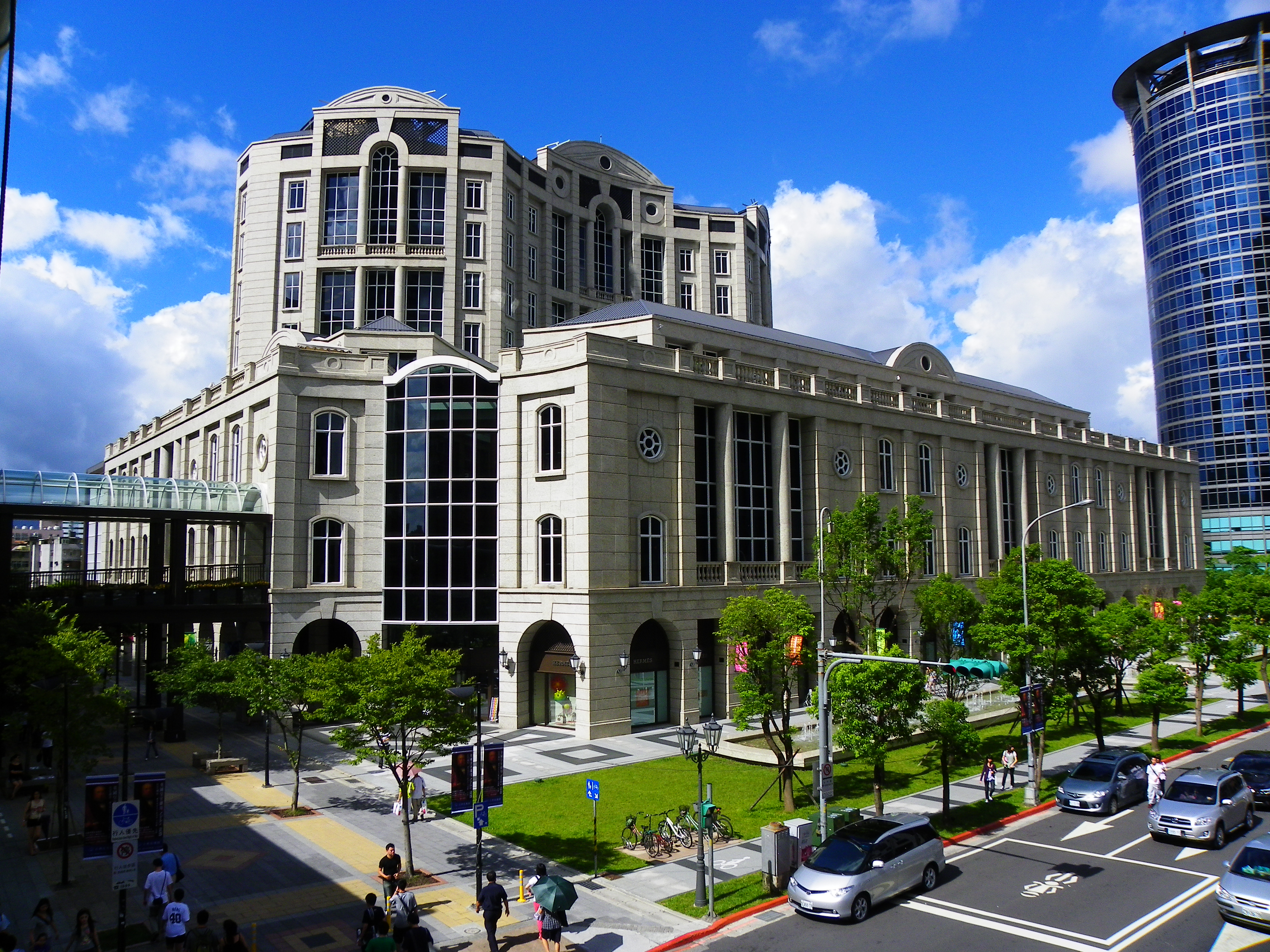
- Location: No. 28, Songren Road, Xinyi District, Taipei, Taiwan
- Coordinates: 25°02′23″N 121°34′04″E
- Opened: September 21, 2009
- Manager: Chun Yee Co., Ltd.
- Architect: P&T Group & Chu-Yuan Lee
- Floor area: 49,593 m^{2} (533,810 sq ft)
- Floors: 9 floors above ground 4 floors below ground
- Public transit: Taipei 101–World Trade Center metro station
- Website: http://www.bellavita.com.tw/

The Bellavita Shopping Center (Chinese: 寶麗廣塲; pinyin: Bǎo lì guǎng chǎng) is a luxury shopping mall in Xinyi Special District, Taipei, Taiwan that opened on September 21, 2009. It is rated amongst the top luxury malls in Asia.

== History ==
Bellavita Shopping Center, which costs about NT$9 billion and took 5 years to build, was completed and opened in 2009. Its behind-the-scenes business unit, Chun Yee Co., Ltd., is jointly operated by the wife of Quanta Computer’s vice chairman and president C.C. Leung, vice chairman and general manager of Quanta Group, and three daughters. The name "Bellavita" was taken from Italian and means "a beautiful life", which is suitable for its concept of providing a better life for shoppers.

== Facilities ==
Jointly designed by the P&T Group and Chu-Yuan Lee, the 9-storey building adopts a European architectural style that combines nature, sunlight, water and plants, with a fountain with changing lights, specially planted palm trees from the Middle East and a colourful garden at atrium.

On level B2 of the mall is the Gourmet Food Hall, which has an oyster bar. The very top floors are home to various restaurants, including the Japanese cuisine of Ton 28 on level 6 and the Taipei branch of L'Atelier de Joël Robuchon on the fifth floor.

== Gallery ==
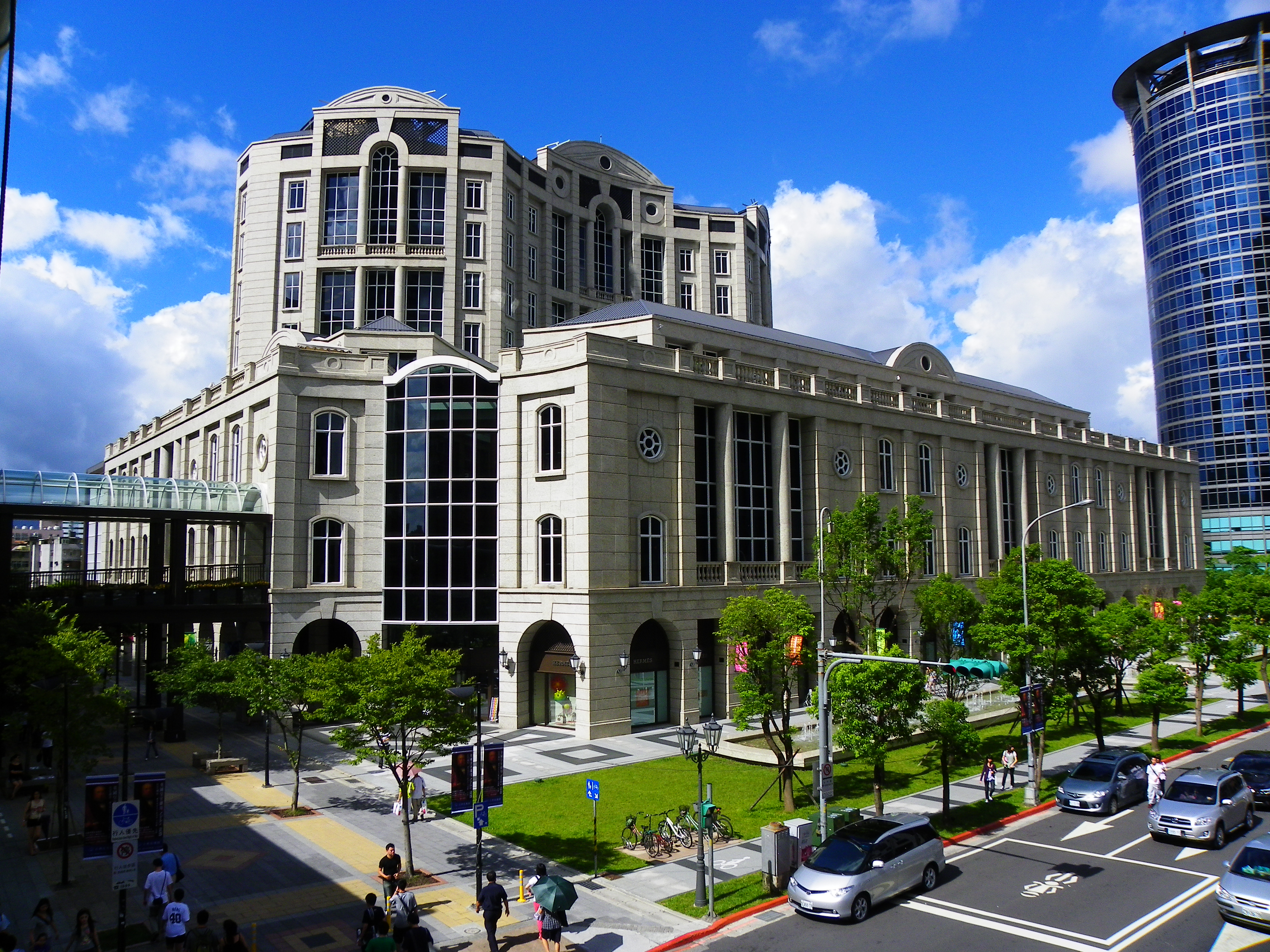
Exterior

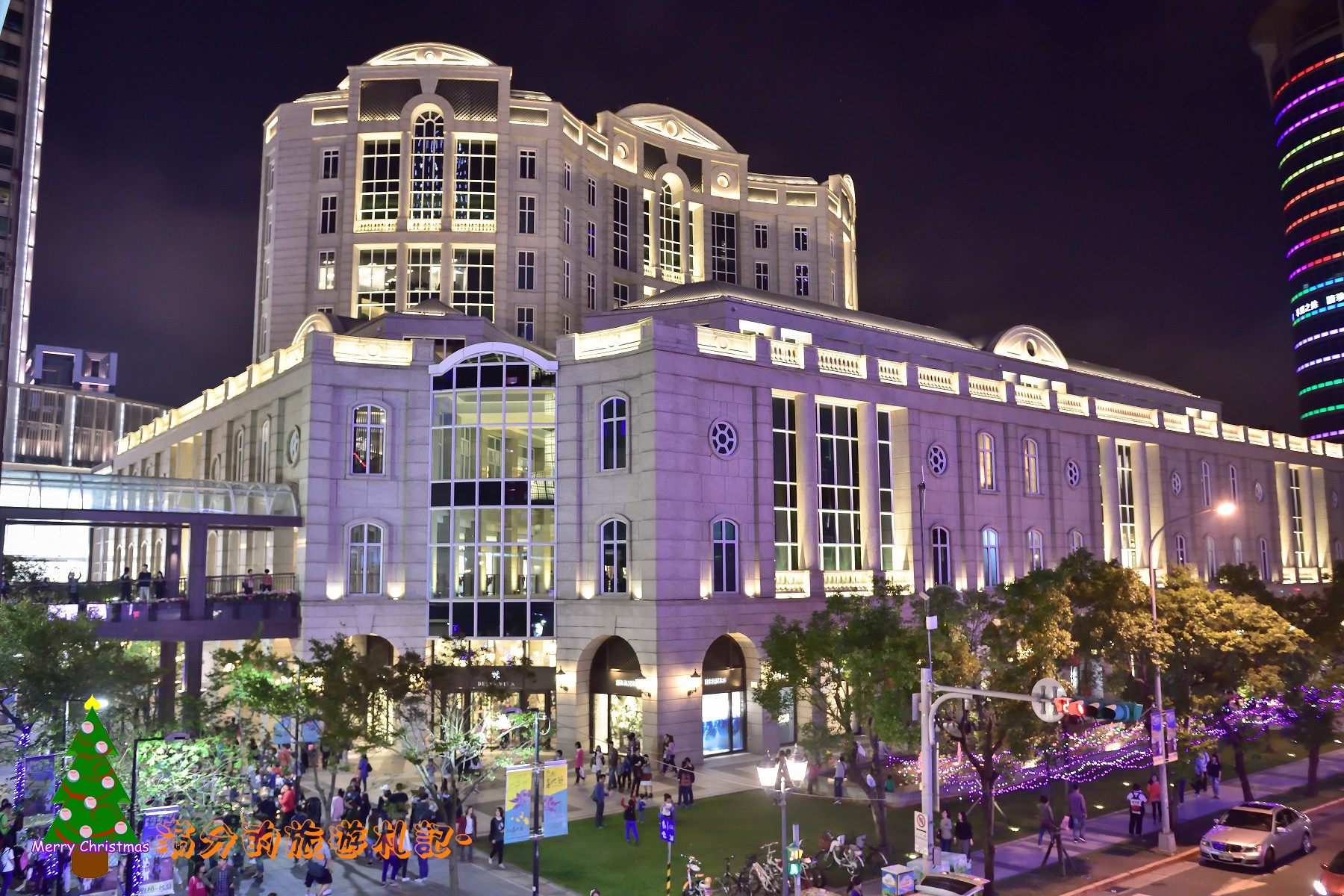
At night

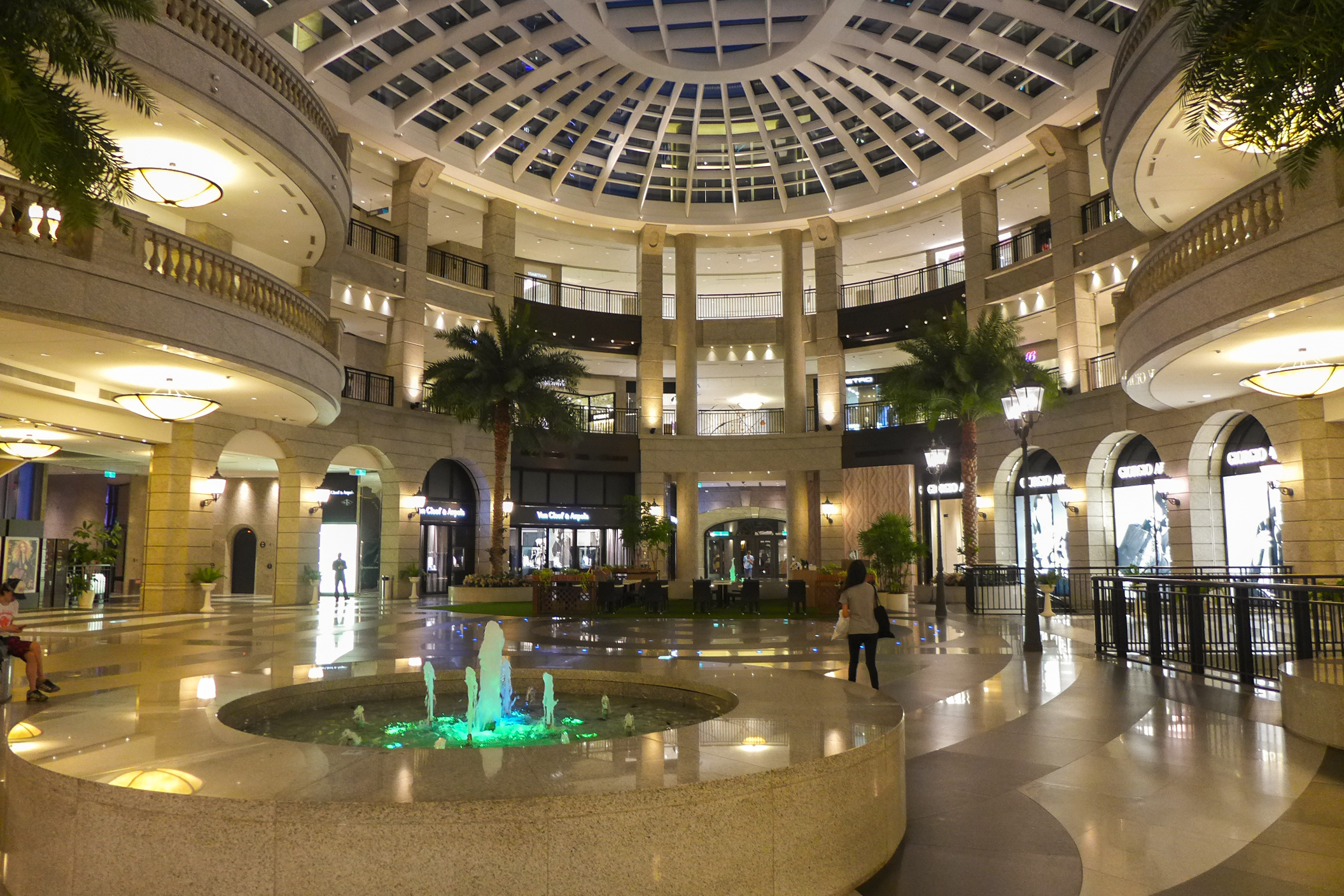
Atrium

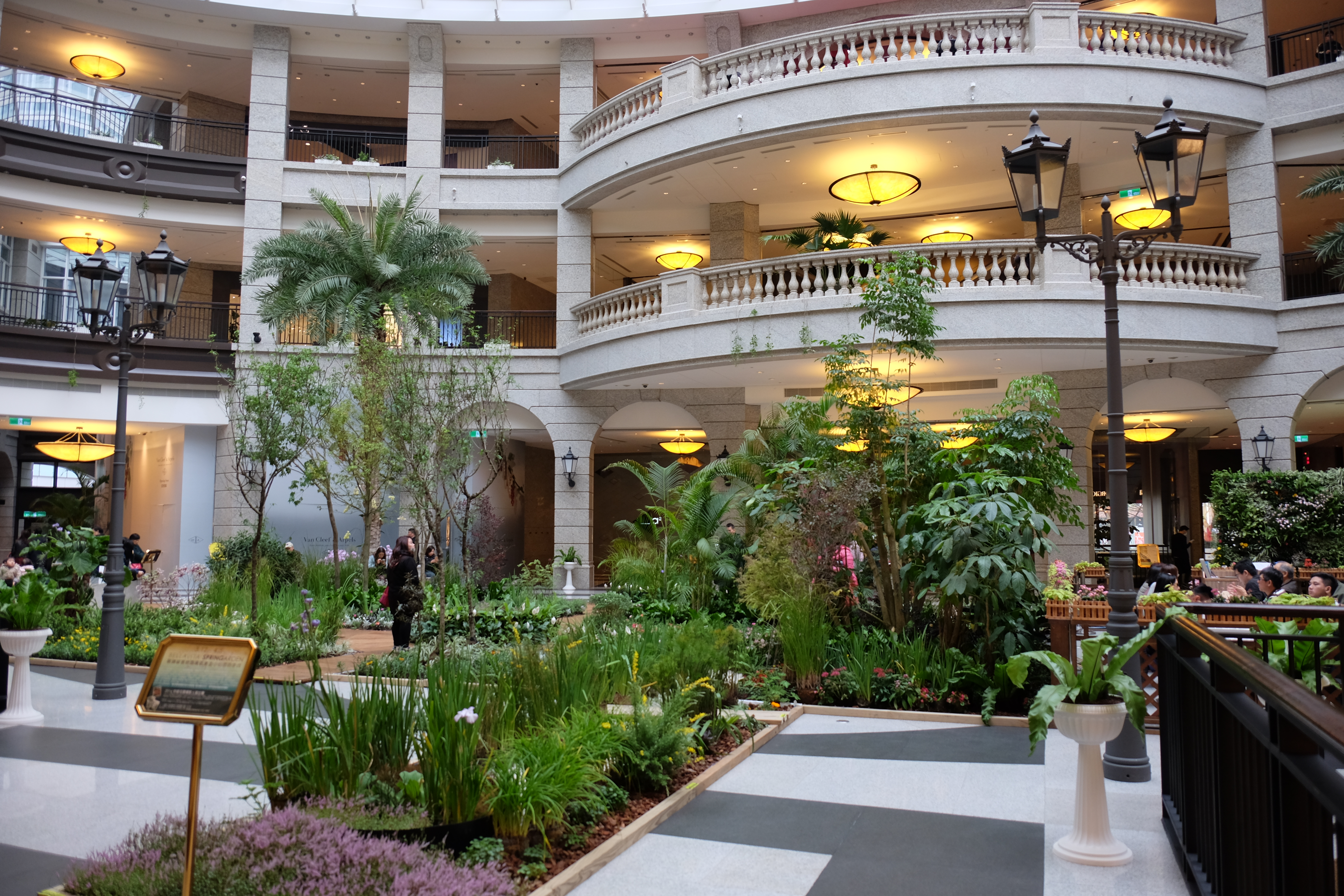
Level 1

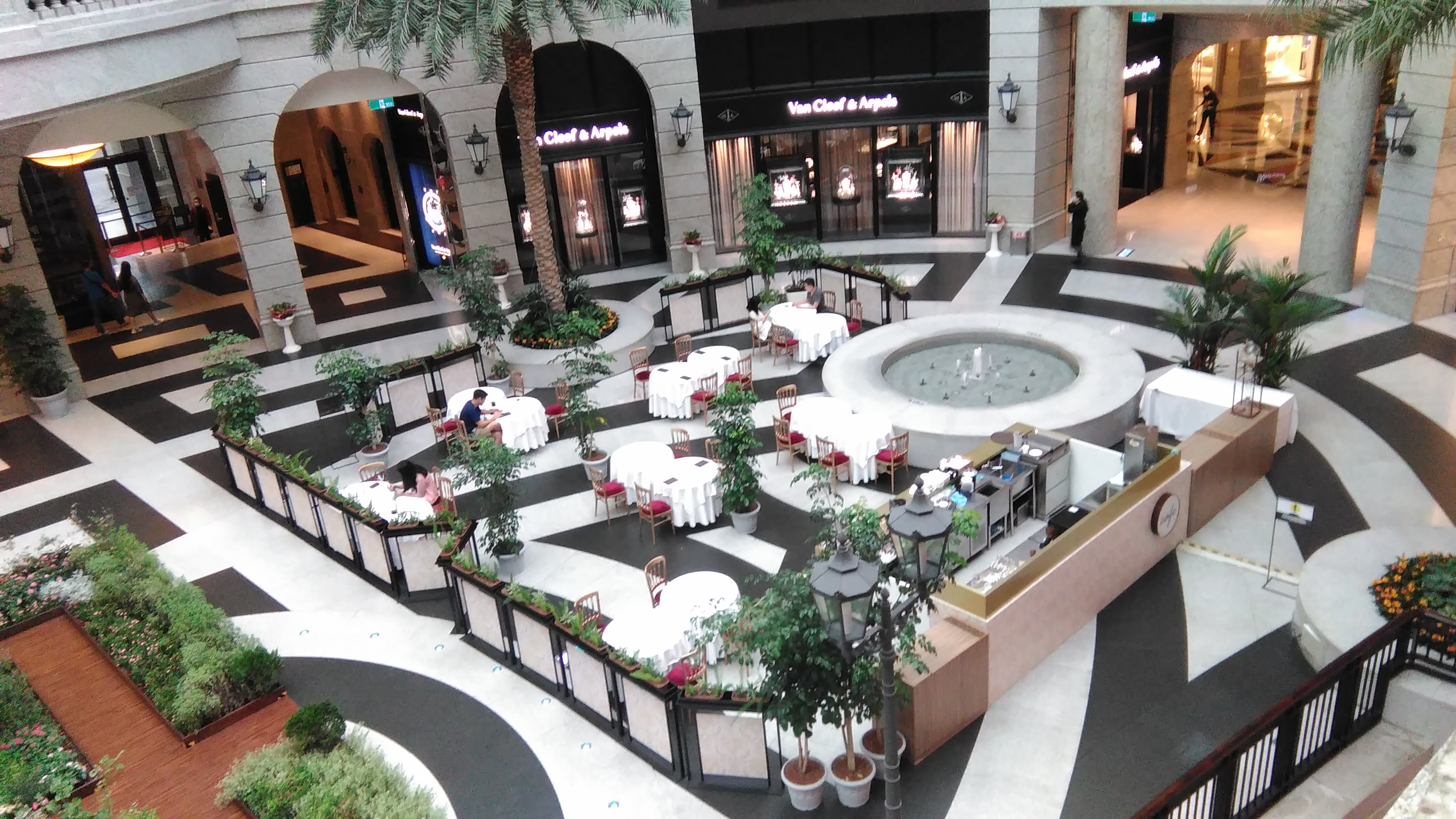
Level 1 Indoor open-air restaurant

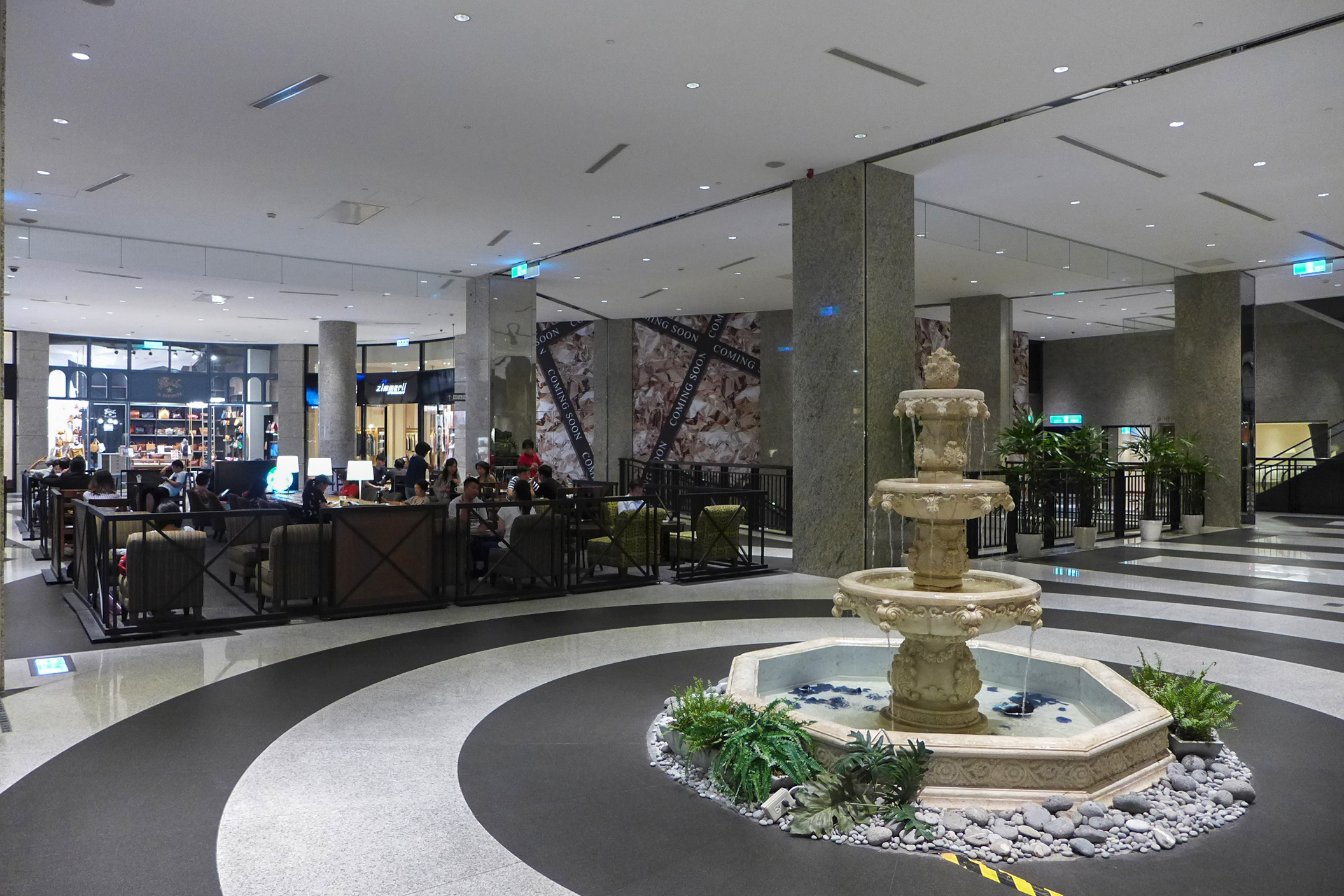
Level B1

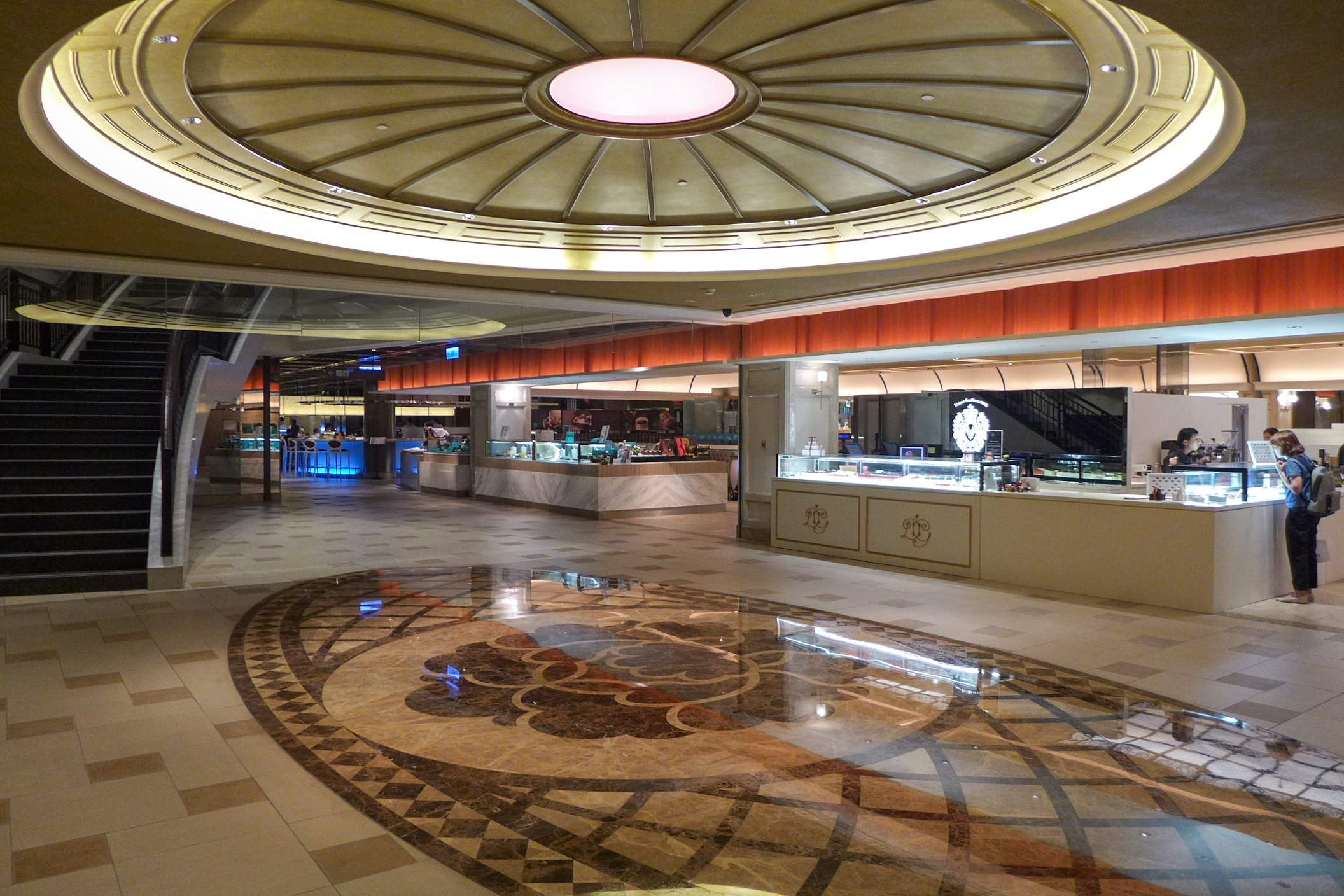
Gourmet Food Hall on Level B2

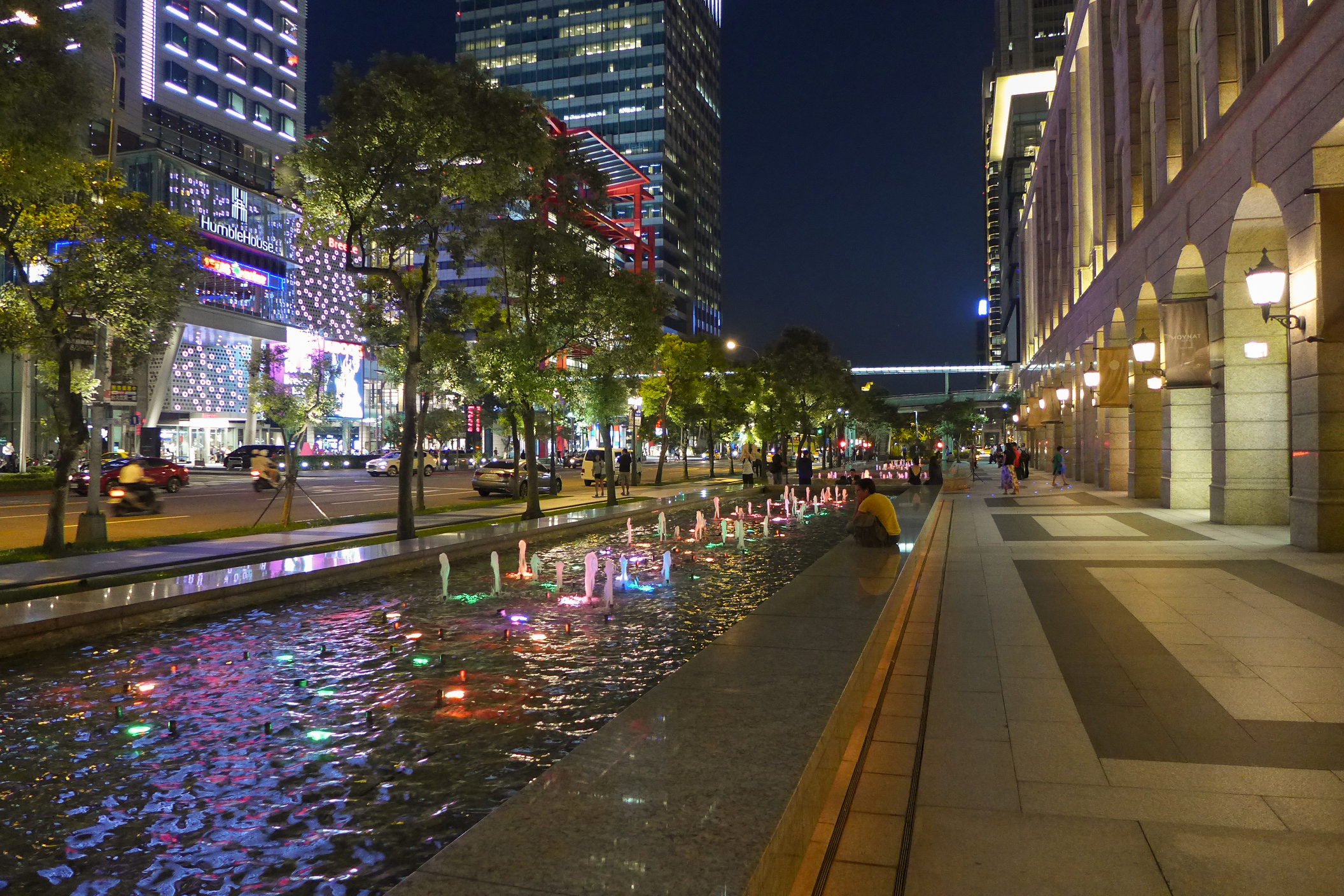
Fountain

== See also ==
- List of tourist attractions in Taiwan
- List of shopping malls in Taipei
