= Cathay Landmark =

Skyscraper in Xinyi, Taipei, Taiwan

Cathay Landmark 國泰置地廣場
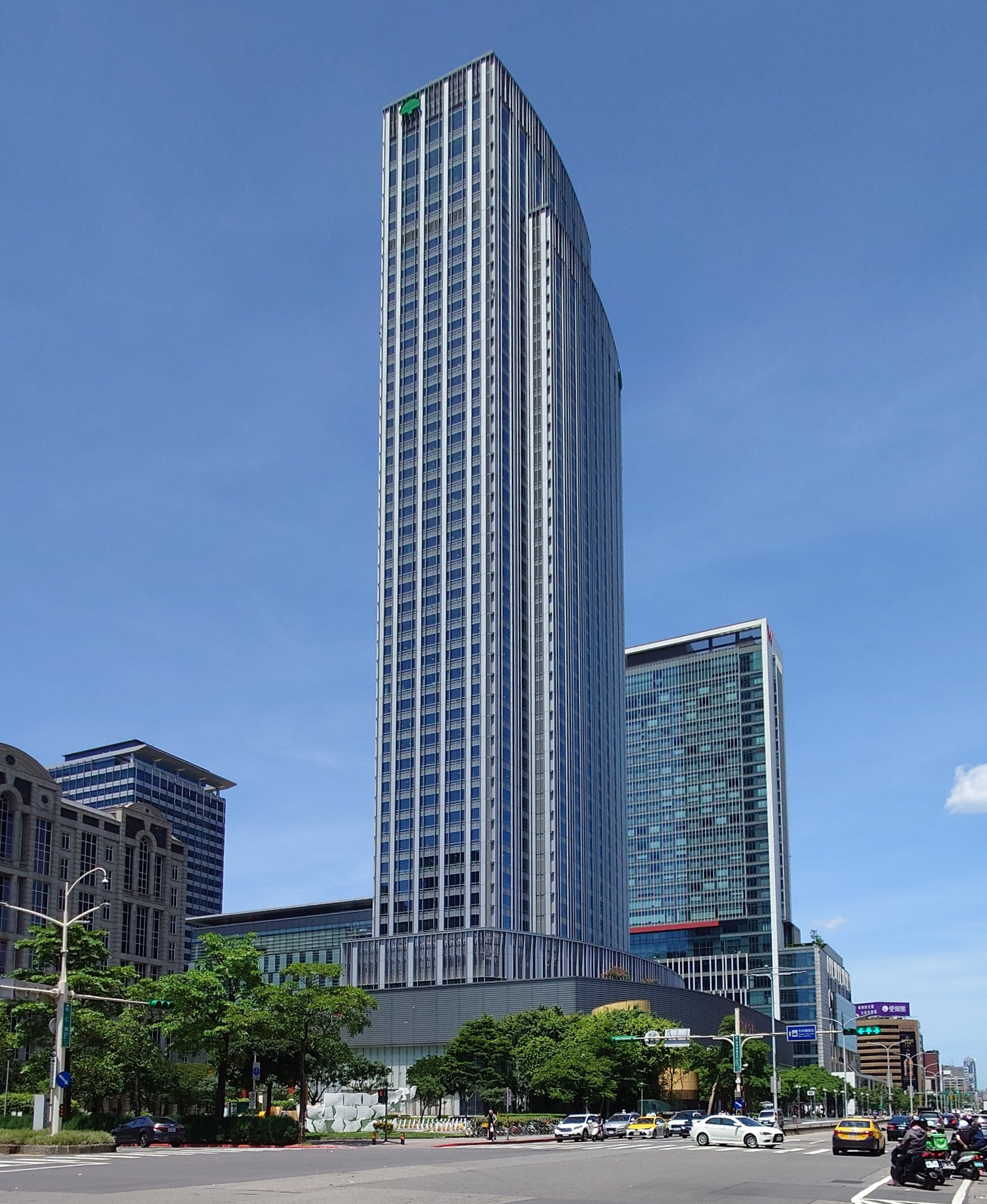
- Interactive map of the Cathay Landmark 國泰置地廣場 area

General information
- Status: Completed
- Type: Office building, Department store
- Location: Xinyi Special District, Xinyi, Taipei, Taiwan
- Coordinates: 25°2′25.7″N 121°34′1.1″E
- Construction started: 27 October 2009
- Completed: 2 February 2015

Height
- Roof: 212 m

Technical details
- Floor count: 46
- Floor area: 152,488.6m^{2}

Design and construction
- Architect: Kris Yao

The Cathay Landmark (Chinese: 國泰置地廣場; pinyin: Guótài Zhìdì Guǎngchǎng) is a skyscraper located in Xinyi Special District, Xinyi District, Taipei, Taiwan. It is the eighth tallest building in Taiwan and the fourth tallest in Xinyi Special District. The height of the building is 212 m (696 ft), the floor area is 152,488.6 m^{2} (1,641,374 sq ft), and it comprises 46 floors above ground as well as 6 basement levels. The building was designed by Kris Yao.

The shopping mall Breeze Xinyi occupies floors B2F through 4F and is operated by the Breeze Group.

== See also ==
- Taipei 101
- Shin Kong Life Tower
- 85 Sky Tower
- List of tallest buildings in Taiwan
- Xinyi Special District
