= Peace Palace (Taipei) =

Residential skyscraper in Daan District of Taipei, Taiwan

- 和平大苑 (Chinese)
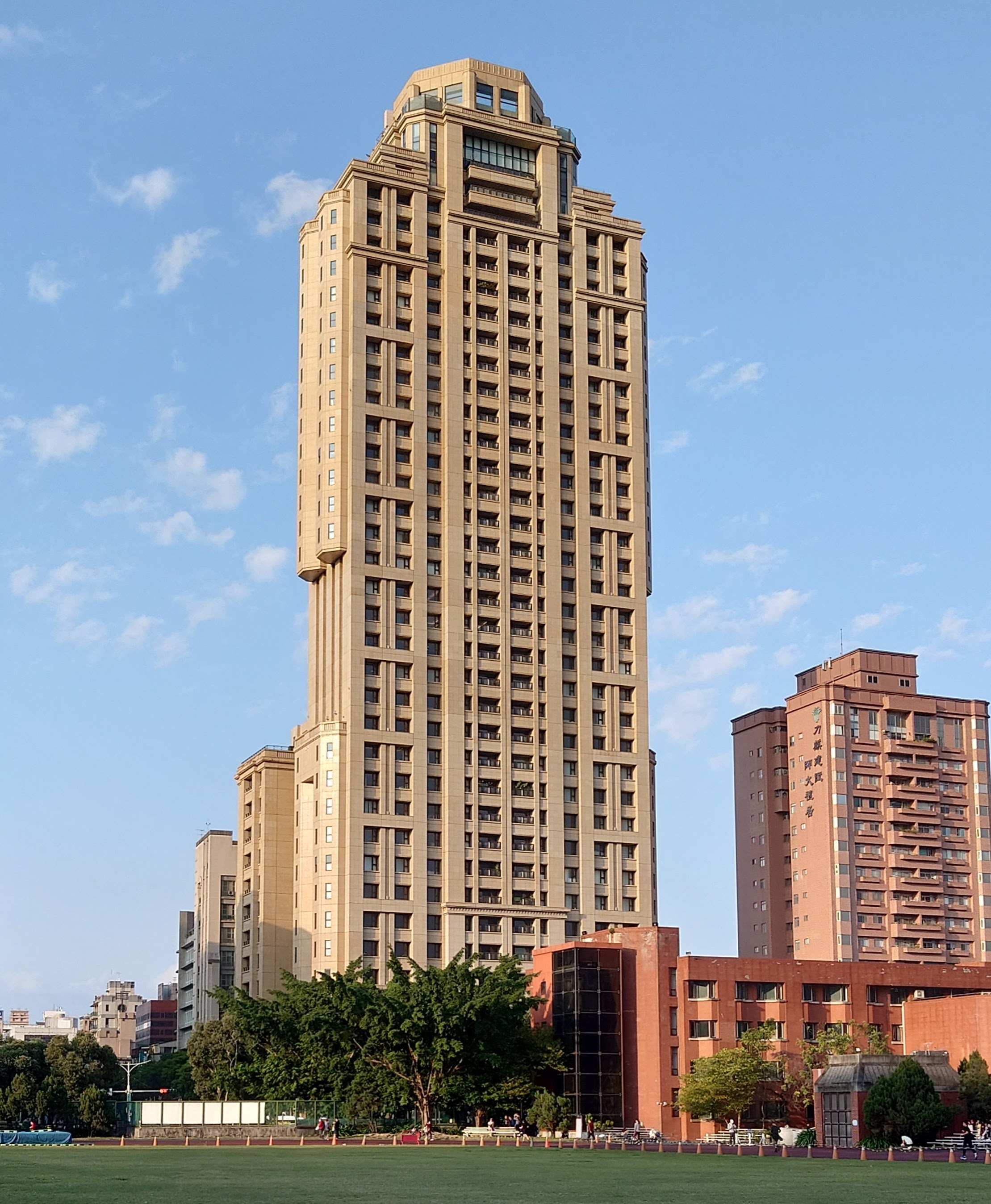
- Interactive map of the Peace Palace area

General information
- Status: Completed
- Type: Residences
- Location: No. 99, Section 1, Heping East Road, Daan District, Taipei, Taiwan
- Coordinates: 25°01′37.15″N 121°31′35.04″E
- Completed: 2014

Height
- Tip: 144 m (472 ft)

Technical details
- Floor count: 38

Design and construction
- Architects: C.T. Chen & Partners

The Peace Palace (Chinese: 和平大苑; pinyin: Hépíng Dà Yuàn) is a residential skyscraper located in Daan District, Taipei, Taiwan. Completed in 2014, the height of the building is 144 m (472 ft), and it comprises 38 floors above ground, as well as seven basement levels.

The residential building is located in close proximity to National Taiwan Normal University and offers 106 luxury apartments units, which successfully appealed to the Taiwanese singer and songwriter Jay Chou, who bought the topmost floor of the building, which has a view of the cityscape of Taipei.

== Design ==
Designed by the Taiwanese architect C. T. Chen, the exterior design was based upon the neo-classical style, with a crown-shaped roof bearing a symbolical resemblance to a mighty king on his throne. The entire building is constructed out of Brazilian gold granite. Structurally, it is a super-seismic residence, which adopts SS steel frame system design. The total steel consumption is up to 9,000 tonnes. In addition, 272 Japanese KYB hydraulic dampers are added to effectively improve wind resistance and Seismic coefficient, meeting the requirements of preventing earthquakes and typhoons common in Taiwan.

The tower has been awarded Honorable Mention in Architectural Design / Tall Buildings by the Architecture MasterPrize as well as Silver in Interior Design / Exterior Lighting by International Design Awards.

== See also ==
- List of tallest buildings in Taipei
- Tao Zhu Yin Yuan
- One Park Taipei
- Huaku Sky Garden
- 55 Timeless
- Diamond Towers
