= Diamond Towers =

Residential skyscraper in Banqiao, New Taipei, Taiwan

Diamond Towers 台北之星
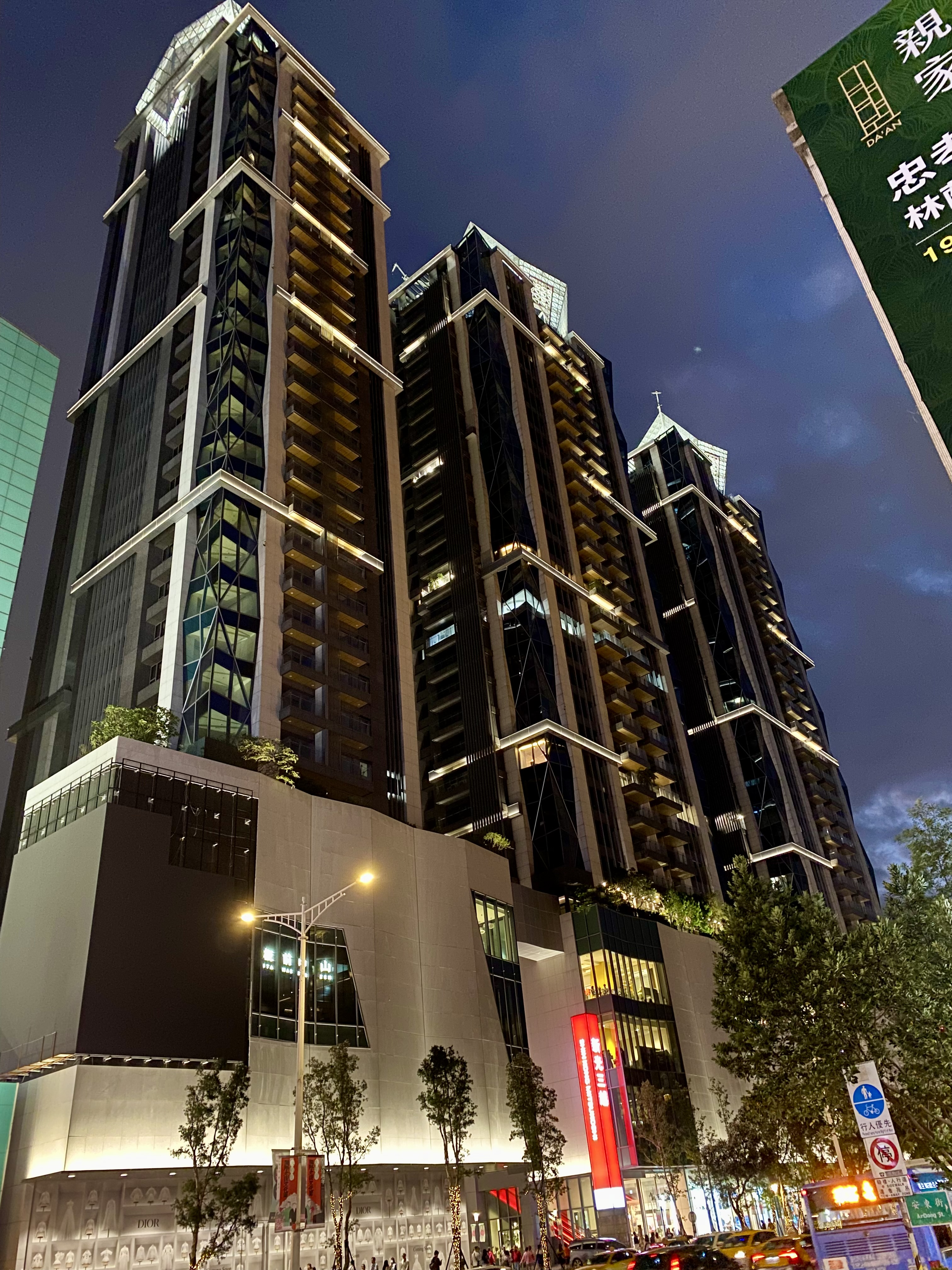
- Interactive map of the Diamond Towers 台北之星 area

General information
- Status: Completed
- Type: Residences
- Location: 268, Section 3, Zhongxiao East Road, Daan, Taipei, Taiwan
- Coordinates: 25°2′30″N 121°32′32″E
- Completed: 2022

Height
- Architectural: Tower C: 134 m (440 ft); Towers A & B: 130 m (430 ft)

Technical details
- Floor count: Tower C: 31; Towers A & B: 30
- Floor area: 87,879 m^{2} (945,920 sq ft)

Design and construction
- Architect: Paul Noritaka Tange

Diamond Towers (Chinese: 台北之星; pinyin: Táiběi Zhī Xīng) is a residential skyscraper complex located in Daan District, Taipei, Taiwan. The complex is an urban renewal project that comprises three skyscraper buildings completed in 2022, with a total floor area of 87,879 m^{2} (945,920 sq ft) and comprising 155 apartment units. The tallest of the three buildings is Tower C, which has a height of 134 m (440 ft) and it comprises 31 floors above ground, as well as 7 basement levels. Towers A and B have a height of 130 m (430 ft) with 30 floors above ground.

The podium of the residential complex houses a Shin Kong Mitsukoshi Department Store, which opened on October 7, 2023.

== See also ==
- List of tallest buildings in Taiwan
- List of tallest buildings in Taipei
- One Park Taipei
- Huaku Sky Garden
- 55 Timeless
- Peace Palace (Taipei)
