= Kee Tai Zhongxiao =

Skyscraper office building in Zhongzheng District of Taipei, Taiwan

Kee Tai Zhongxiao 基泰忠孝
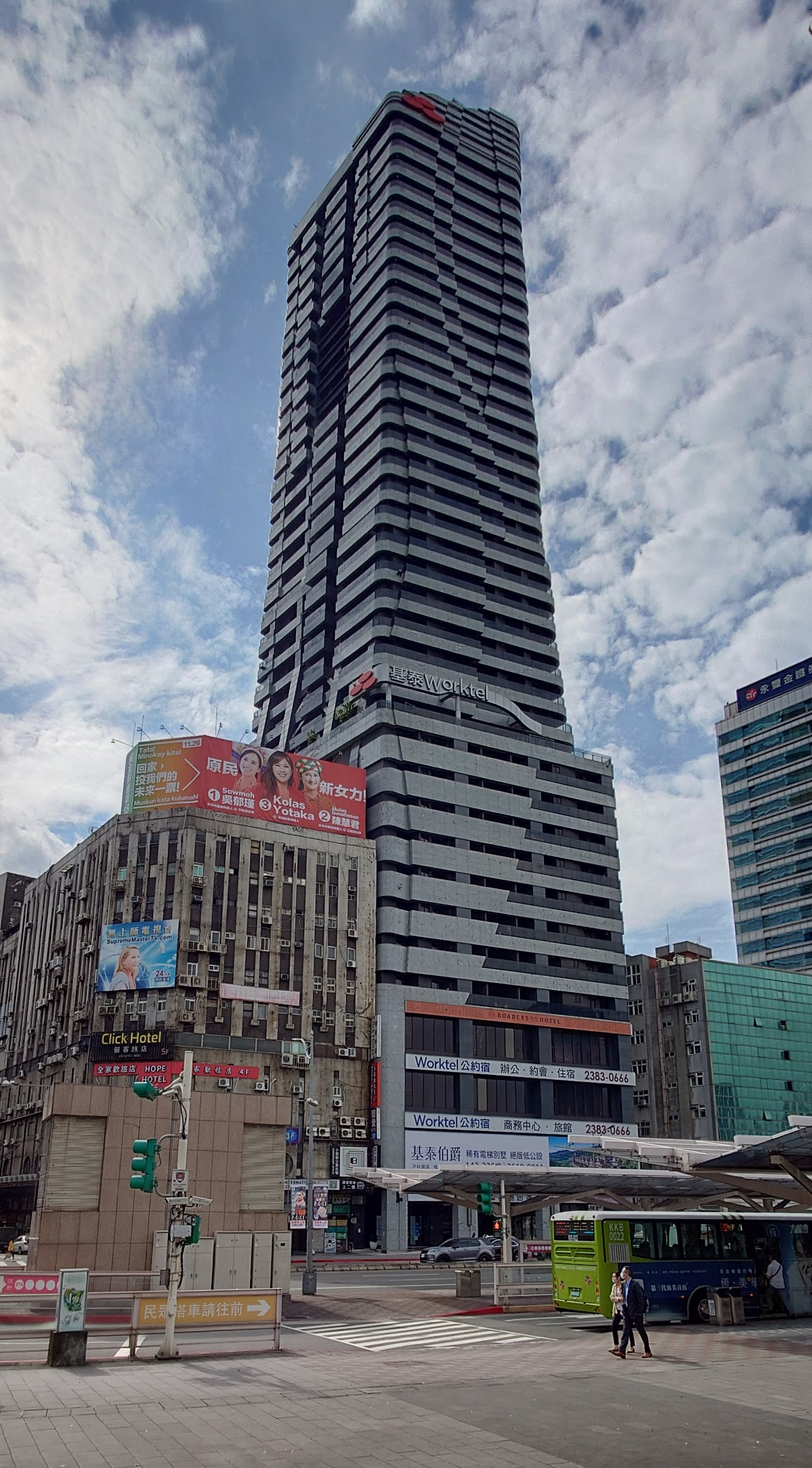
- Interactive map of the Kee Tai Zhongxiao 基泰忠孝 area

General information
- Status: Completed
- Type: Office, Hotel, Retail
- Location: No. 80 Section 1, Zhongxiao West Road, Zhongzheng District, Taipei, Taiwan
- Coordinates: 25°2′48″N 121°30′50″E
- Construction started: 2012
- Completed: 2019

Height
- Architectural: 151.5 metres (497 ft)

Technical details
- Floor count: 37
- Floor area: 25,605 m^{2} (275,610 sq ft)

Kee Tai Zhongxiao (Chinese: 基泰忠孝; pinyin: Jī Tài Zhōngxìao) is a 151.5 m (497 ft), 37-storey mixed-used skyscraper located in Zhongzheng District, Taipei, Taiwan. The building started construction in 2012 and was completed in 2019. The floor area of the building is 25,605 m^{2} (275,610 sq ft), and it comprises 37 floors above ground, as well as six basement levels. As of January 2021, the building is the second tallest building in Zhongzheng District, after Shin Kong Life Tower.

== Location ==
The building is located in Zhongzheng District, which is the traditional city center of Taipei, home to most of the national government buildings of Taiwan, including the Presidential Office, the Executive Yuan, the Control Yuan, the Legislative Yuan, the Judicial Yuan and various government ministries. The building is located in close proximity to Taipei Main Station.

== See also ==
- List of tallest buildings in Taiwan
- List of tallest buildings in Taipei
