= The Diamond (skyscraper) =

Skyscraper office building in Neihu District, Taipei, Taiwan

The Diamond 長虹雲端科技大樓
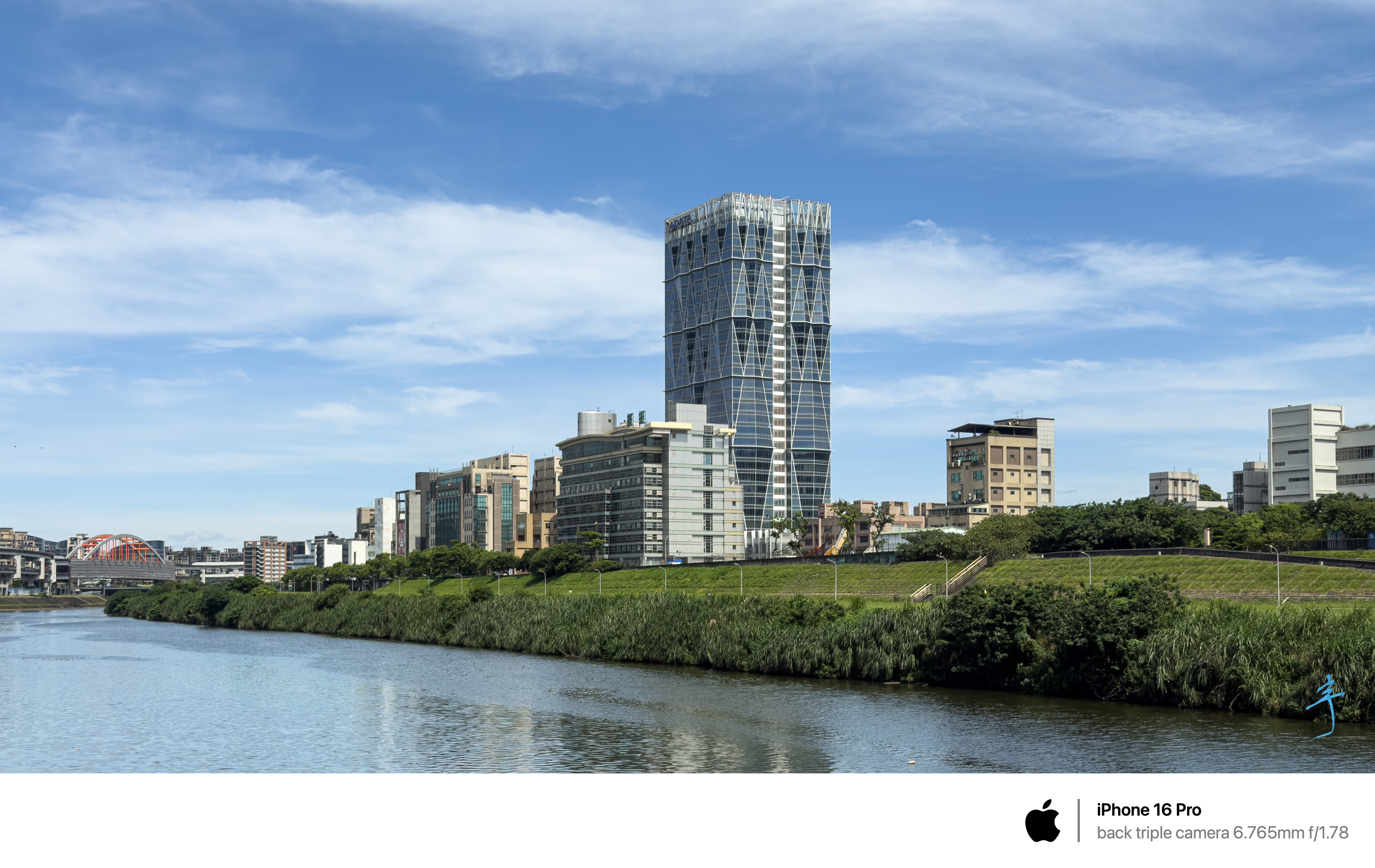
- Interactive map of the The Diamond 長虹雲端科技大樓 area

General information
- Status: Completed
- Type: Office building
- Classification: Office
- Location: Neihu District, Taipei, Taiwan
- Coordinates: 25.0612728°N 121.5999073°E
- Construction started: 2017
- Completed: 2021

Height
- Roof: 136.2 m (447 ft)

Technical details
- Floor count: 30

The Diamond (Chinese: 長虹雲端科技大樓) is a 30-storey, 136.2 m (447 ft) skyscraper office building completed in 2021 and located in Neihu District, Taipei, Taiwan. The building serves as the new corporate headquarters of the Taiwanese constructions company Chong Hong Construction Co., Ltd. In December 2023, ADATA opened its new headquarters in the building.

== See also ==
- List of tallest buildings in Taiwan
- List of tallest buildings in Taipei
