= Hua Nan Bank Headquarters =

- 華南銀行總行世貿大樓
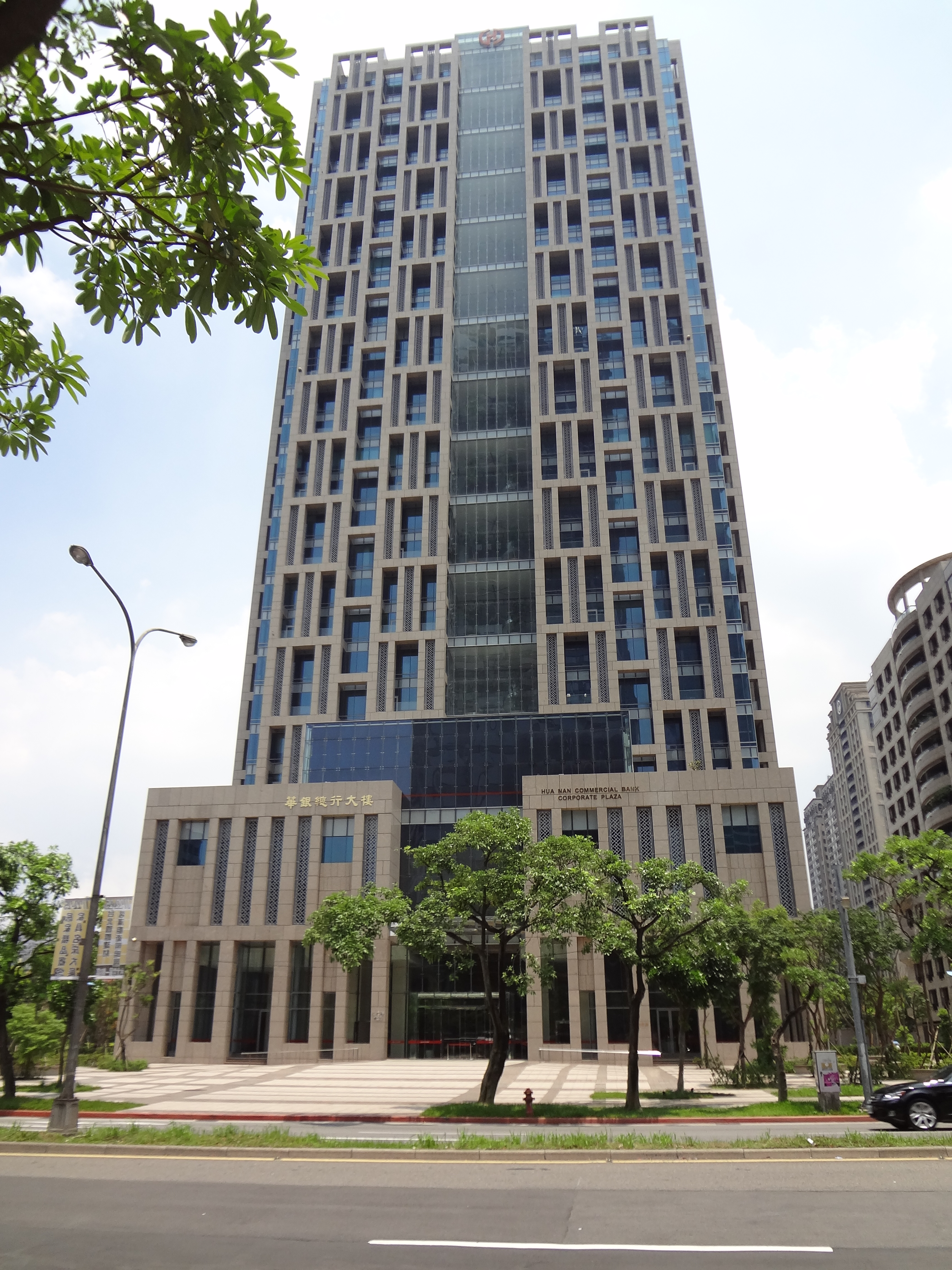
- Interactive map of the Hua Nan Bank Headquarters area

General information
- Type: Office
- Location: 123 Songren Road; Xinyi District, Taipei, Taiwan
- Coordinates: 25°2′3.5″N 121°34′9.1″E
- Completed: 2014

Height
- Antenna spire: 154.5 m (507 ft)

Technical details
- Floor count: 27
- Floor area: 52,131.74 m^{2}

Design and construction
- Architect: Kris Yao

The Hua Nan Bank Headquarters, also known as Hua Nan Bank World Trade Building (Chinese: 華南銀行總行世貿大樓; pinyin: Huánán yínháng zǒngháng shìmào dàlóu), is a 154.5 m (507 ft) tall skyscraper built from 2011 to 2014 in Xinyi District, Taipei, Taiwan.

The building houses offices on 27 floors and 2 basement levels served by a total of 10 elevators, with a total floor area of 52,131.74 m^{2}.

The building has been LEED Gold certified for its consideration of environmental issues and is designed by the Taiwanese architect Kris Yao.

== See also ==
- List of tallest buildings in Taiwan
- List of tallest buildings in Taipei
