= Yihwa International Complex =

Skyscraper complex in Zhongshan District of Taipei, Taiwan

Yihwa International Complex 西華富邦
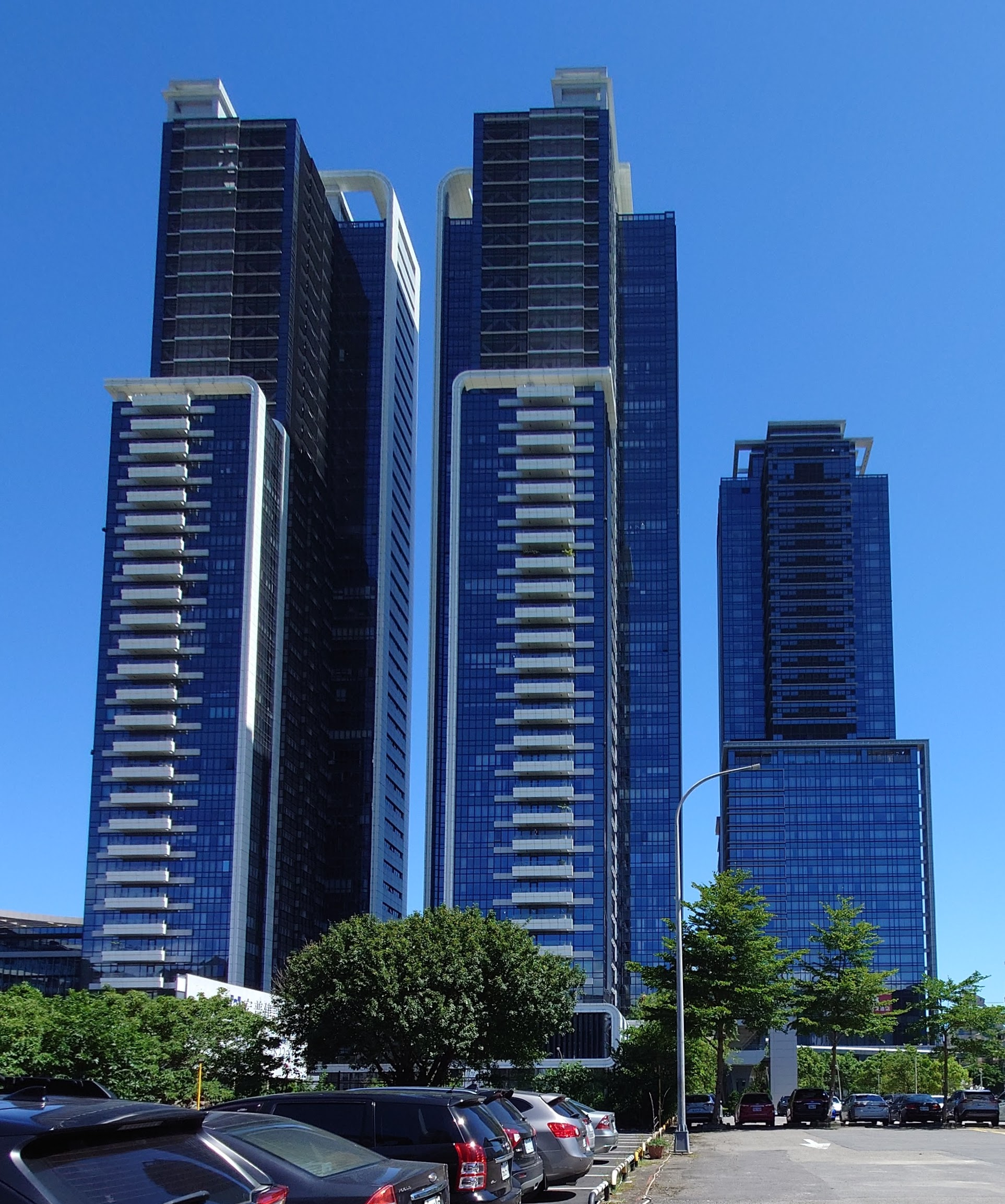
- Interactive map of the Yihwa International Complex 西華富邦 area

General information
- Status: Completed
- Type: Towers A & B: Residential; Tower C: hotel
- Location: Zhongshan District, Taipei, Taiwan
- Coordinates: 25°04′51″N 121°33′34″E
- Construction started: 2010
- Completed: 2014

Height
- Architectural: Towers A & B: 160 m (520 ft); Tower C: 150 m (490 ft)

Technical details
- Floor count: Towers A & B: 45; Tower C: 42
- Floor area: 203,963.86 m^{2} (2,195,448.7 sq ft)

Design and construction
- Architect: DBI Design Pty Ltd

The Yihwa International Complex (Chinese: 西華富邦; pinyin: Xīhuá Fù Bāng) is a complex of skyscrapers located in Zhongshan District, Taipei, Taiwan. The complex consists of three skyscrapers: Towers A and B are residential twin skyscrapers with a height of 160 m (520 ft) and each tower comprises 45 floors above ground with four basement levels; Tower C is a skyscraper hotel with a height of 150 m (490 ft) and comprises 42 floors above ground with four basement levels. They are completed in 2014 and are the tallest buildings in Zhongshan District as of December 2020.

Tower C houses Marriott Taipei, which is managed by the Yihwa International Hotel Corporation.

== See also ==
- List of tallest buildings in Asia
- List of tallest buildings in Taiwan
- List of tallest buildings in Taipei
