= List of tallest buildings in Taipei =

Skyline of Taipei Greater Taipei 台北天際線
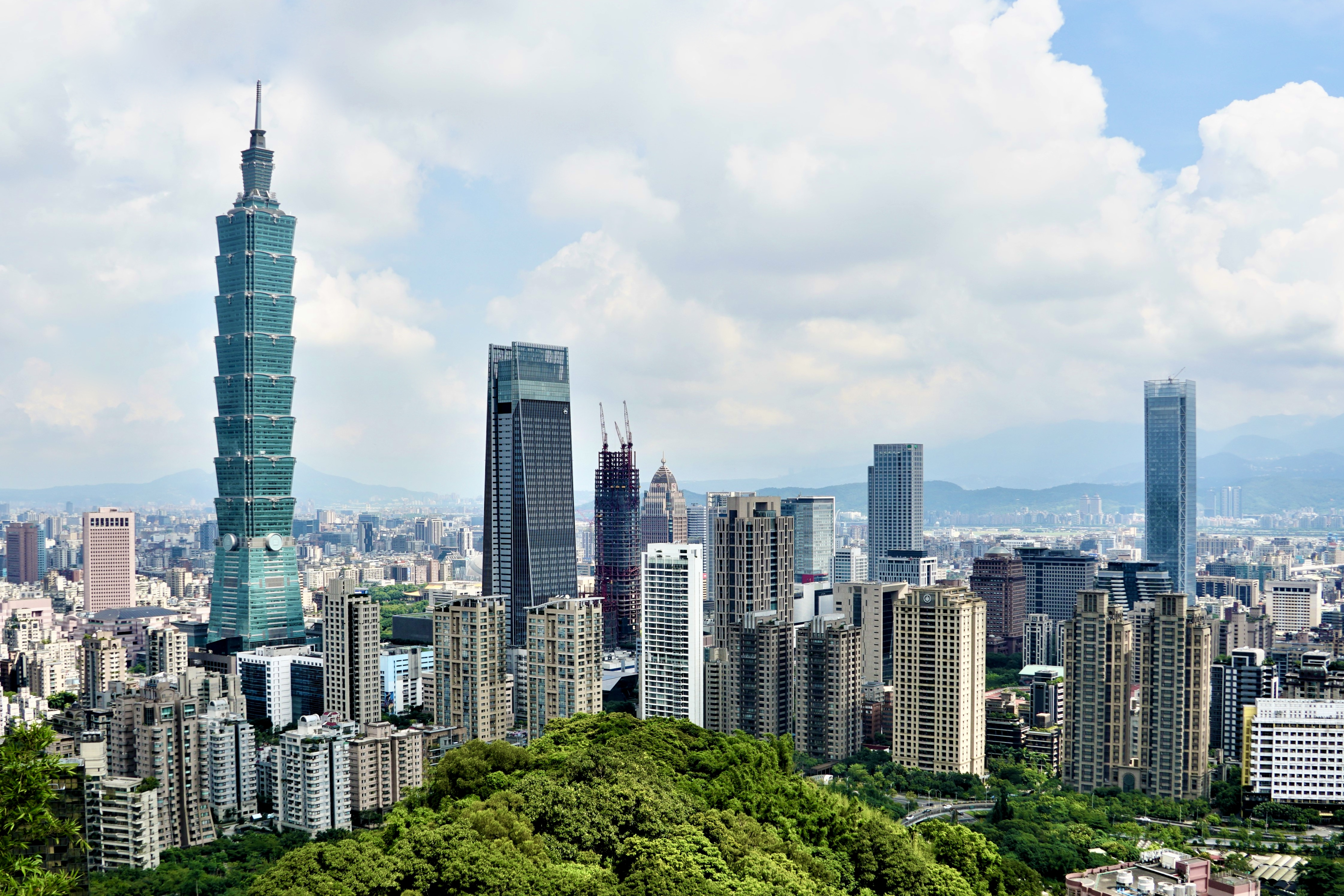
- Skyscrapers in Xinyi District
- Population: 7,034,084 (2019)
- Cities included: Taipei, New Taipei City
- Tallest building: Taipei 101 (2004)
- Tallest building height: 508 m (1,667 ft)
- Major clusters: Xinyi; See more
- First 150 m+ building: Shin Kong Life Tower (1993)

Number of tall buildings (2026)
- Taller than 100 m (328 ft): 236
- Taller than 150 m (492 ft): 39
- Taller than 200 m (656 ft): 8
- Taller than 300 m (984 ft): 1
- Taller than 400 m (1,312 ft): 1

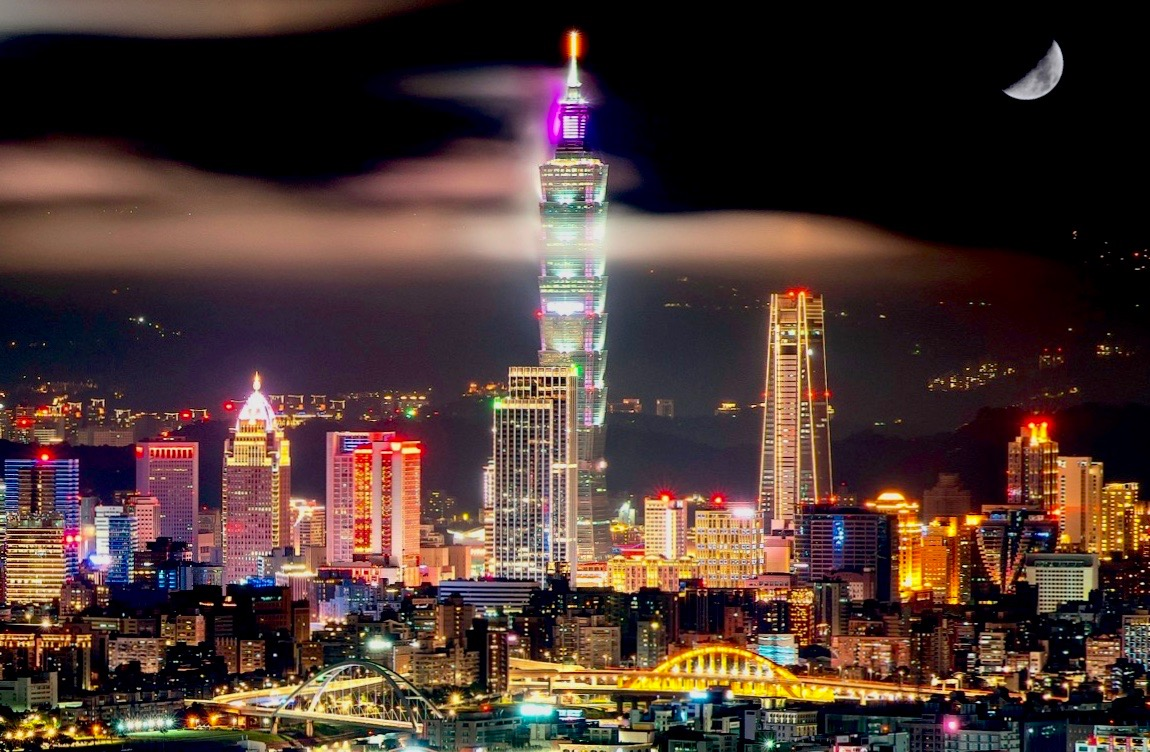
Skyline of Xinyi at night

Taipei is the capital of Taiwan, and its metropolitan area of Greater Taipei is the largest in the country, with a population of over 7 million as of 2019. Greater Taipei, hereafter simply known as Taipei, includes the municipalities of Taipei and New Taipei City, with the former being an enclave of the latter. As of 2026, Taipei contains 39 buildings above 150 metres (492 feet) in height, eight of which are taller than 200 m (656 ft). It is among the largest skylines in East Asia outside of China.

Taipei's skyline has a relatively early history by Asian standards. The first building in the city to surpass 150 m in height was the Shin Kong Life Tower, which was completed in the district of Zhongzheng in 1993 and is 244.8 m (803 ft) tall. This was followed a year later by the twin skyscrapers of Far Eastern Plaza in Daan. The focal point of the skyline would shift to Xinyi with the completion of the 101-storey Taipei 101 in 2004, which Taipei's skyline is still famous for today. The supertall skyscraper rises 508 metres (1,667 ft), and is known for its distinctive postmodernist architectural style, which evokes a traditional Asian pagoda. Taipei 101 surpassed the Petronas Towers in Kuala Lumpur to become the world's tallest building, a title it held until 2010. It remains the tallest building in Taiwan, and is currently Asia's 6th tallest building and the world's 10th tallest building.

The construction of new skyscrapers rose during the 2010s, with an increasing number of skyscrapers, primarily office towers, being built in Xinyi, as well as more residential skyscrapers throughout New Taipei. Both trends have continued into the 2020s. The district of Linkou, which was relatively rural until the 2010s, has seen an influx of skyscrapers and high-rises owing to high population growth. A further seven skyscrapers are under construction in Taipei as of 2026, including the Taipei Twin Towers, consisting of two skyscrapers in Zhongzheng. The tallest will reach a height of 369 m (1,210 ft), becoming the city's second supertall skyscraper and second tallest building.

Partly owing to the surrounding hilly terrain, Taipei's cityscape of the city is characterized by an abundance of residential high-rises throughout its urban area. The tallest buildings in Taipei are mainly concentrated in the central business district of Xinyi Planning District within Xinyi, and to a lesser extent, the business districts of Banqiao and Xinzhuang in New Taipei, and the traditional city centre of Zhongzheng District. However, skyscrapers can also be found in Daan, Linkou, Shilin, Xizhi, Zhongshan, and the northern seaside district of Tamsui. In addition, shorter high-rises are common in almost every district, resulting in a polycentric skyline.

== History ==
Number of buildings by height in Greater Taipei by the end of each year. Click on the legend to toggle a specific height on or off. View chart definition.

=== 1940s-1980s ===
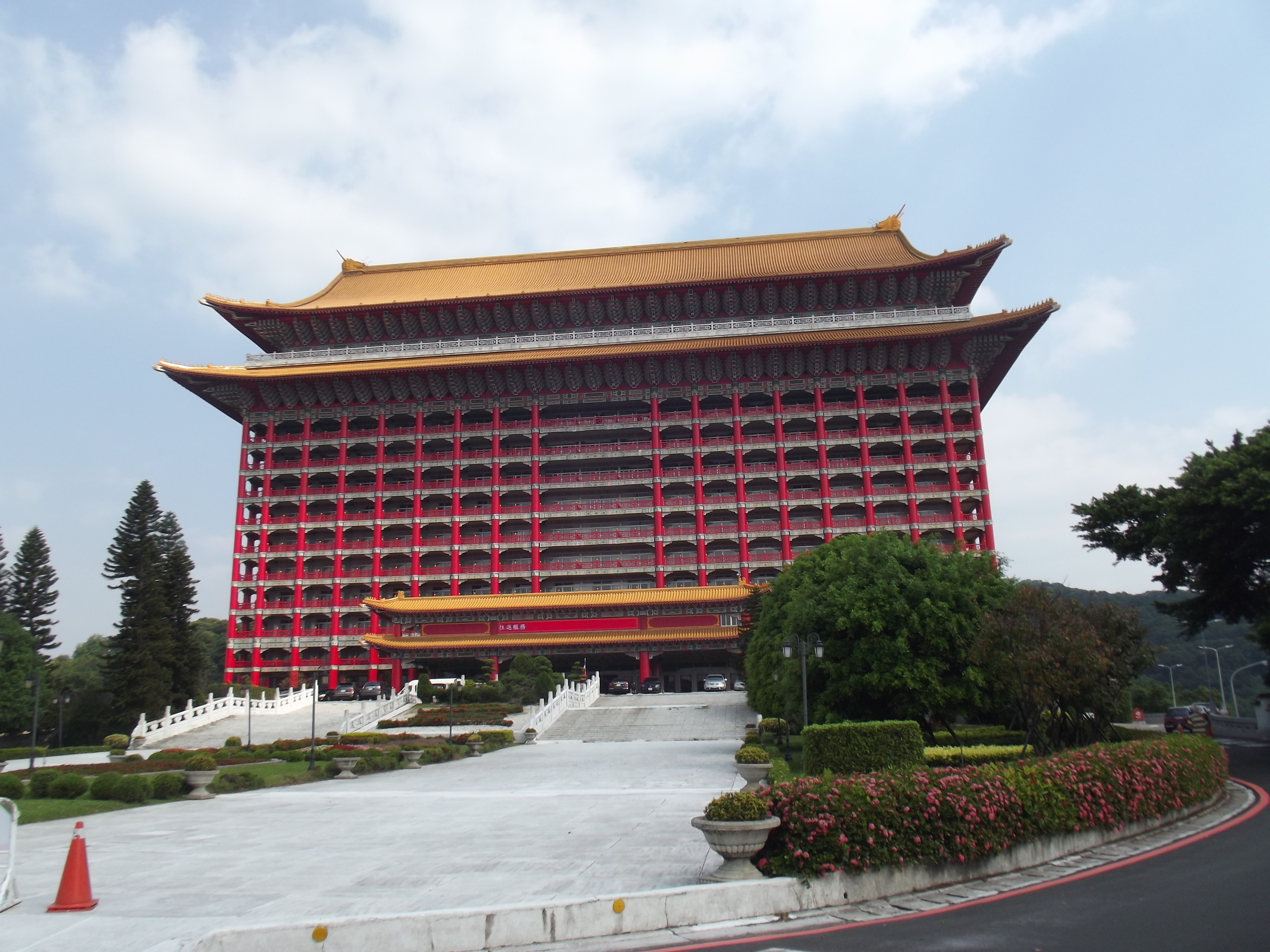
The classically-inspired Grand Hotel

Following the Chinese Civil War, the Republic of China was confined to the island of Taiwan. Taiwanese architects in the late 1940s focused on “de-Japanization” and “re-Sinicization” of Taiwan’s urban landscapes, with new buildings drawing influence from traditional Chinese architecture, particularly those of the Ming and Qing dynasties. One of the first high-rises to be built in Taipei is the 14-storey main building of the Grand Hotel. Inspired by the Hall of Supreme Harmony in Beijing, it became Taiwan's tallest building upon completion in 1973, at 87 metres tall. From the mid-1970s, commercial high-rise buildings and apartments began to appear, especially on Dunhua Road. Rapid urbanization and economic growth contributed to the growth of taller buildings; the Grand Hotel was overtaken by the First Commercial Bank Building in 1981, then by the Taiwan Power Building in 1983, the first building in Taiwan to exceed 100 m (328), housing the headquarters of the Taiwan Power Company. While the prior two buildings were built in the traditional city centre within Zhongzheng, the next record holder for the city's tallest building, TWTC International Trade Building, would be in the Xinyi Planning District, which had been a planned area for a new central business district since 1976.

=== 1990s ===
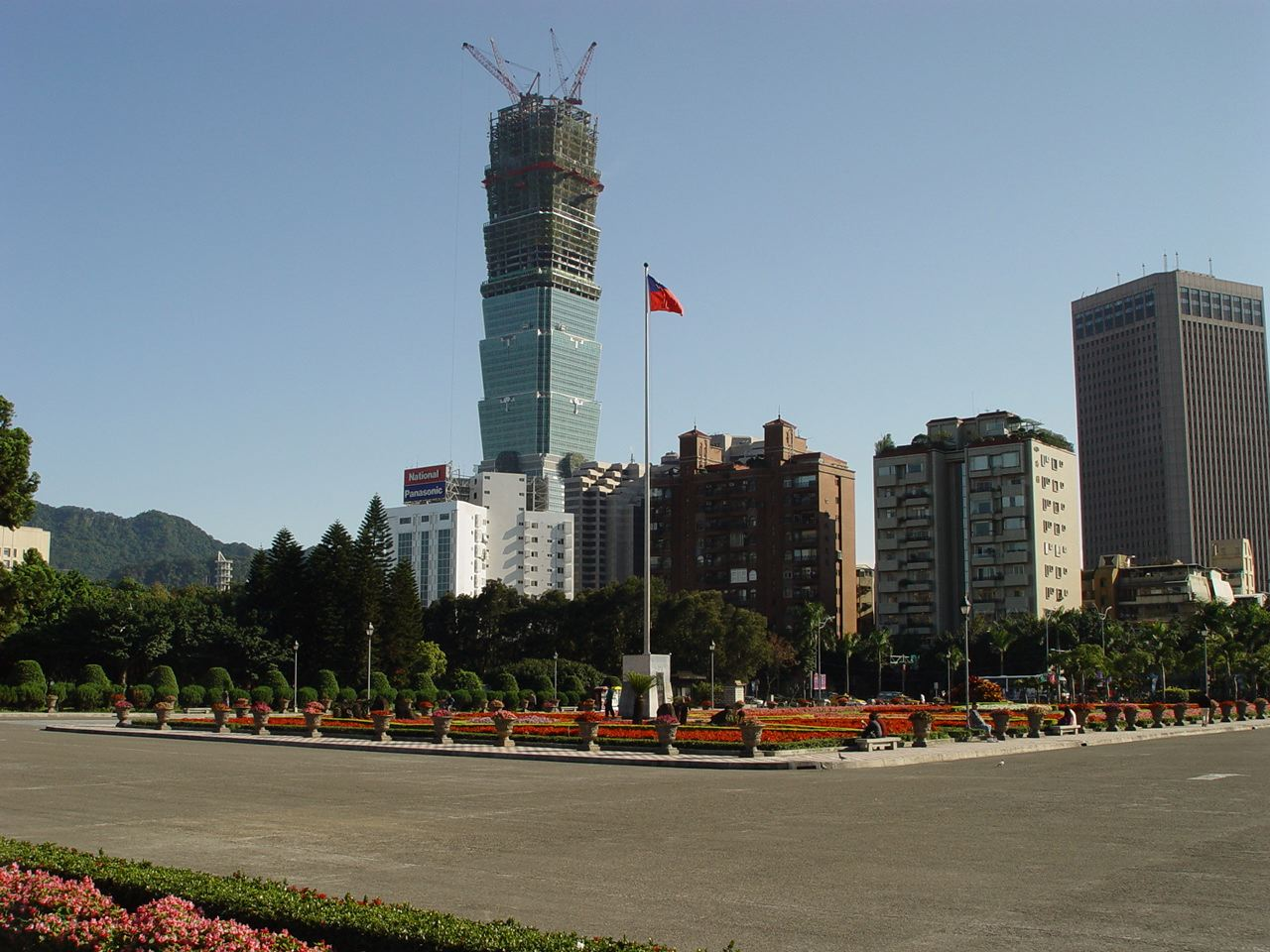
Taipei 101, seen under construction in 2003

Taipei's skyline grew considerably in height in the 1990s, particularly so with the Shin Kong Life Tower, the first building in Taiwan to exceed 150 m (492 ft) when it was completed in 1993. Besides serving as the headquarters of the eponymous Shin Kong Group, it hosted an observation deck on the 46th floor, which cost NT$120 and became popular with tourists. A year later, the Far Eastern Plaza, a twin skyscraper complex in Daan District, was built along the line of high-rises along Dunhua Road, a few blocks south of where Tuntex Tower had been built in 1990. Far Eastern Plaza are still the tallest buildings in Daan and the tallest twin towers in Taipei today. One of Taipei's earliest residential skyscrapers, Tuntex Highrise Building, was completed in 1998, becoming the tallest building in New Taipei at the time.

In 1997, planning began for a new skyscraper to be built in Xinyi near the city hall, an initiative conceived by then mayor of Taipei (and later President of Taiwan) Chen Shui-bian. Originally planned as a 66-storey building, the number of floors was increased to 101 as each planned tenant wanted to be in the main building. Construction on what would become Taipei 101 began in 1999, undeterred by the 1997 Asian Financial Crisis.

=== 2000s ===
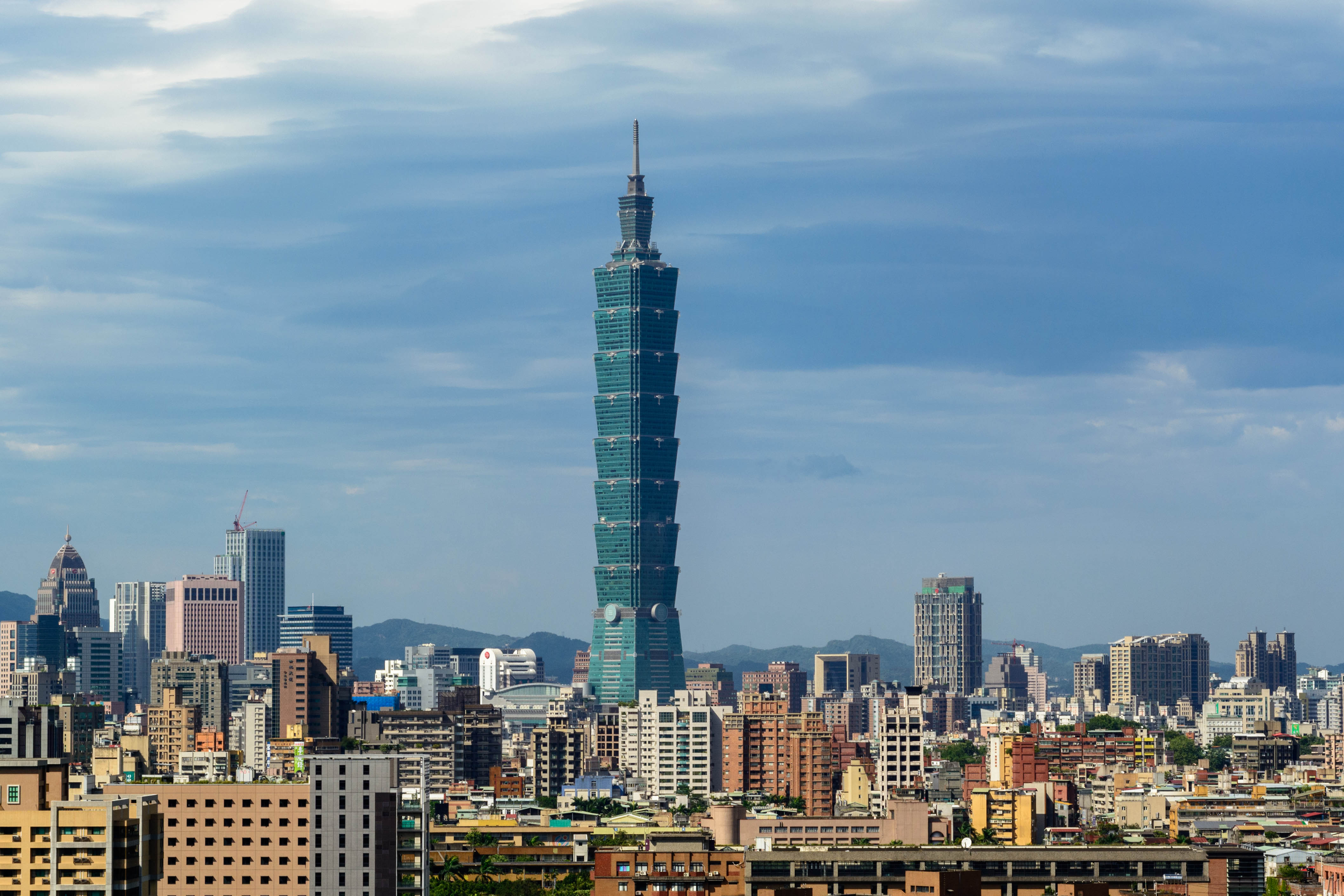
Even as recently as 2014, Taipei 101 is noticeably more isolated in Xinyi compared to today.

Taipei 101 topped out in 2003, and the building was completed in 2004, becoming the tallest building in Taiwan, Asia, and the world at a height of 508 m (1,667 ft), surpassing the Petronas Towers in Kuala Lumpur, Malaysia by over 50 m (164 ft). The building also broke several other records, such as containing the world's fastest lift and the largest, heaviest, and tallest tuned mass damper, to counteract seismic risks. Few new skyscrapers were completed in the 2000s, with the only other one in the city of Taipei being the Uni-President International Tower, which was completed in 2003—a year before Taipei 101. Until W Hotel was built in 2011, Taipei 101 was one of only two skyscrapers in Xinyi above 150 m (492 ft), being over three times taller than the next tallest building in the district.

=== 2010s ===
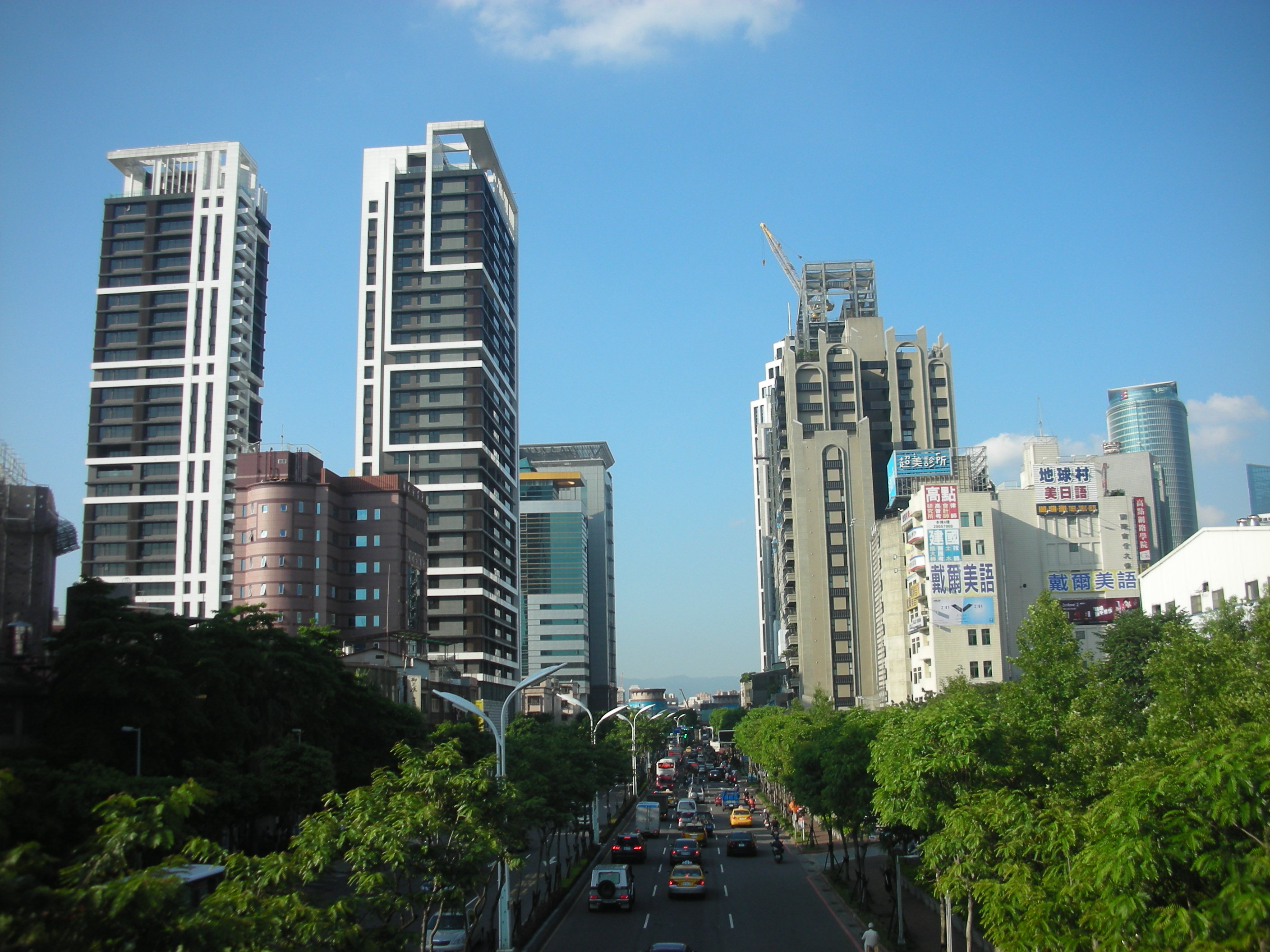
A cluster of skyscrapers in Banqiao in 2015

While not surpassing Taipei 101 in height, Taipei added a considerable number of skyscrapers during the 2010s, with many being built further from the central areas of Taipei, mainly in various districts across New Taipei. A cluster of high-rises had emerged around Banqiao Station throughout the 2000s, with developments such as the Panhsin Twin Towers (2009) and the Far Eastern Mega Tower (2013) forming new peaks in that cluster. Further north in Banqiao, the four-tower Neo Sky Dome residential complex was completed in 2010. Chicony Electronics Headquarters, serving as the headquarters of the namesake electronics manufacturer, became the tallest building in Sanchong in 2013 at 181 m (594 ft). In Xinzhuang, Farglory 95rich became the districts tallest building in 2017 at 184 m (604 ft), anchoring the later development of Xinzhuang Sub-city Center in the late 2010s and 2020s.

To the far east of Taipei's built-up area, the Farglory U-Town complex of four skyscrapers was completed in 2013, becoming the tallest buildings in Xizhi; the district is a relatively low-rise area otherwise. Other districts that received their first skyscraper above 150 m (492 ft)—and hence a new tallest building—include Zhongshan, with the Yihwa International Complex in 2014; Shilin, with Huaku Sky Garden in 2015; and the northern seaside district of Tamsui, with The Crystal Plaza in 2013. On a shorter scale, Yonghe has also gained more residential high-rises, with The Grand Twins (三輝雙子星), built in 2019, as a new tallest.

Meanwhile, the skyline of Xinyi continued to grow. The tallest new building in Taipei during the entire decade was Taipei Nan Shan Plaza, the city's current third tallest building, constructed by and named for Nan Shan Insurance. Other commercial buildings like Hua Nan Bank Headquarters and Cathay Landmark also helped to fill the Xinyi skyline around Taipei 101. In addition, while not taller than 150 m, the residential high-rse Tao Zhu Yin Yuan has earned praise for its twisting form. Elsewhere, Kee Tai Zhongxiao would become only the second skyscraper above 150 m (492 ft) in Zhongzheng, after Shin Kong Life Tower.

=== 2020s ===
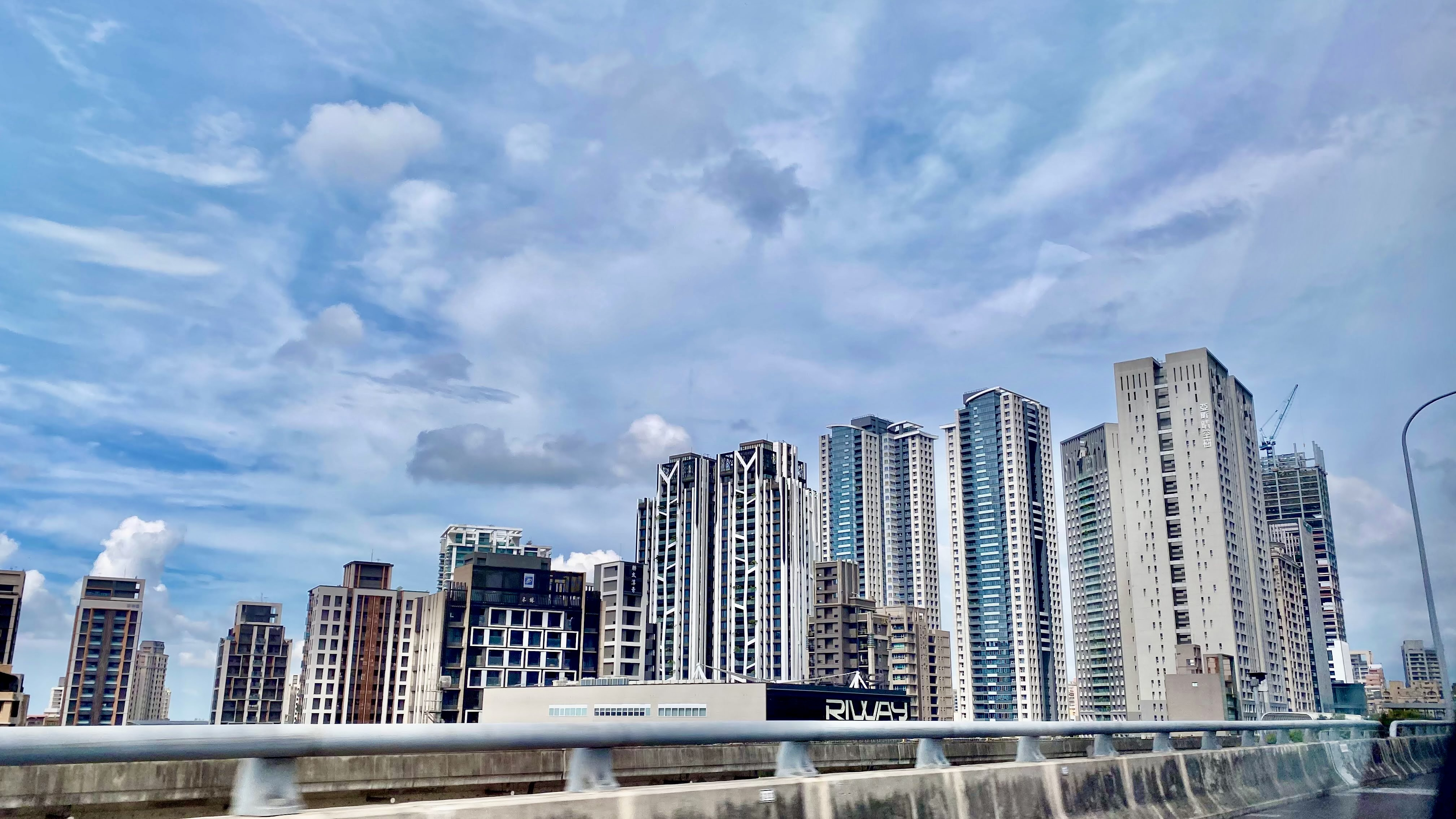
New high-rise buildings in Linkou

New additions to Xinyi in the 2020s have filled out its skyline, most notably with The Sky Taipei in 2022, a hotel that is the city's second tallest building at 280 m (920 ft); two more significant developments are Fubon Xinyi A25 (2022) and Four Seasons Hotel Taipei (2025). Zhongzheng's skyline will undergo a major transformation with the Taipei Twin Towers, two buildings that are planned to be 369 m (1,211 ft) and 289 m (948 ft) tall. Currently under construction, the taller building will be Taipei's second supertall skyscraper. The complex is meant to revitalize the area around Taipei Main Station. Completion is expected in 2027.

So far, the decade has also seen the spread taller residential high-rises to even more districts of Taipei and New Taipei. The twin skyscrapers of He-huan Landmark Towers, built in 2025, are now the tallest buildings in Xindian. The coastal district of Bali finished its tallest building, the 22-storey Kingdom Longjing, in 2022. Neihu received its current tallest building, The Diamond (長虹雲端科技大樓) in 2021, rising to 30 stories and 136 m (447 ft). Similarly, while not as built-up as other districts in Taipei, Songshan has also been getting taller with the completion of the 24-storey Sunrise Plaza (揚昇君苑) along the Keelung River in 2024. The district of Beitou is also seeing an influx of high-rises, with the current tallest, Tianmu Changyu A (天母常玉 A), built in 2025. The skyline around Beitou will be transformed by the now under construction New Kinpo Group Headquarters, which at 266 m (872 ft) will be more than twice the height of Tianmu Changyu A.

Perhaps the most dramatic shift in character can be seen in the district of Linkou. Separated from Taipei's main built-up area by hills, Linkou was largely underdeveloped until the 2010s. A growing population has led to the construction of numerous skyscrapers here, including the Sunland 41 development and currently culminating in the Eastern Group Headquarters, completed in 2025 as the ninth-tallest building in the city.

== Cityscape ==
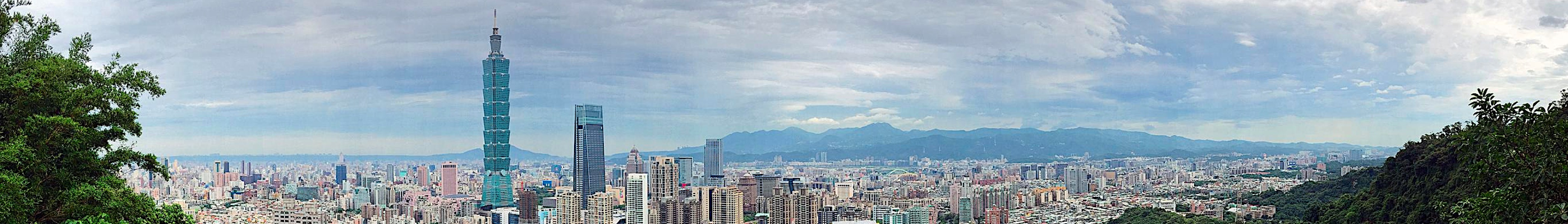
A panoramic view of Taipei from Elephant Mountain in 2018.
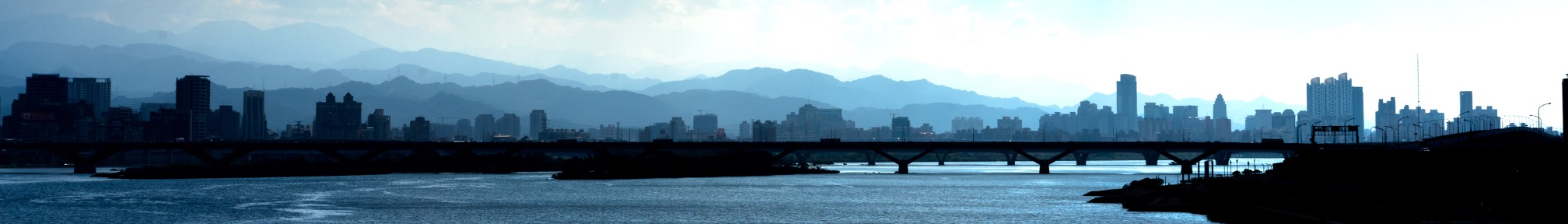
A panoramic view of New Taipei in 2016, across the Tamsui River

== Map of tallest buildings ==
=== Central Taipei ===
The following map shows the location of skyscrapers in the central districts of Xinyi, Zhongzheng, and Daan that are taller than 159 m (492 ft). Each marker is coloured by the decade of the building's completion.

Skyscrapers taller than 150 m (328 ft) in Xinyi, Zhongzheng, and Daan
- 1990s
- 2000s
- 2010s
- 2020s
1 Taipei 101
2 The Sky Taipei
3 Taipei Nan Shan Plaza
4 Fubon Xinyi A25
5 Shin Kong Life Tower
7 Cathay Landmark
8 Farglory Financial Center
15 Four Seasons Hotel Taipei
19 Far Eastern Plaza Tower 1
20 Far Eastern Plaza Tower 2
32 Hua Nan Bank Headquarters
33 Uni-President International Tower
37 Kee Tai Zhongxiao
38 W Hotel

=== Greater Taipei ===
The following map shows the location of skyscrapers in Greater Taipei that are taller than 150 m (492 ft). Each marker is coloured by the decade of the building's completion. Buildings included in the map above are not labelled here.

Skyscrapers taller than 150 m (328 ft) in Greater Taipei
- 1990s
- 2000s
- 2010s
- 2020s
6 Far Eastern Mega Tower
9 Eastern Group Headquarters
10 Neo Sky Dome Block B
11 Farglory 95rich
12 Chicony Electronics Headquarters
13 i-Tower
14 Panhsin Twin Towers
16 Neo Sky Dome Block C
17 Neo Sky Dome Block D
18 Le M Residence
21 Sunland 41 Tower A
22 Sunland 41 Tower B
23 Yihwa International A
24 Yihwa International B
25 Farglory U-Town Tower B
26 Farglory U-Town Tower C
27 The Crystal Plaza
28 He-huan Landmark Tower A
29 He-huan Landmark Tower B
30 Huaku Sky Garden
31 Neo Sky Dome Block A
34 Tuntex Highrise Building
35 Farglory U-Town Tower D
36 Farglory U-Town Tower A
39 Yihwa International Hotel

== Tallest buildings ==
This lists ranks completed skyscrapers in Taipei and New Taipei City that stand at least 150 m (492 ft) tall as of 2026, based on standard height measurement. This includes spires and architectural details but does not include antenna masts. The “Year” column indicates the year of completion. Buildings tied in height are sorted by year of completion with earlier buildings ranked first, and then alphabetically.

Was the tallest building in Taipei upon completion

Rank	Name	Image	Location	Height m (ft)	Floors	Year	Purpose	Notes
1	Taipei 101 (台北101)		Xinyi; Taipei; 25°02′01″N 121°33′53″E	508 (1,667)	101	2004	Office	The tallest building in the world from 2004 to 2010. Currently the 11th tallest in the world, 6th tallest in Asia and tallest in Taiwan. Tallest building completed in Taipei in the 2000s.
2	The Sky Taipei (台北天空塔)		Xinyi; Taipei; 25°02′12″N 121°33′58″E	280 (920)	56	2024	Hotel	Tallest hotel in Taipei. Tallest building completed in Taipei in the 2020s.
3	Taipei Nan Shan Plaza (臺北南山廣場)		Xinyi; Taipei; 25°02′04″N 121°34′02″E	272 (892)	48	2018	Office	Tallest building completed in Taipei in the 2010s.
4	Fubon Xinyi A25 (富邦信義A25總部)		Xinyi; Taipei; 25°02′22″N 121°34′13″E	266.3 (874)	54	2022	Office	
5	Shin Kong Life Tower (新光人壽保險大樓)		Zhongzheng; Taipei; 25°02′45″N 121°30′55″E	244.8 (803)	51	1993	Office	Tallest building in Taipei and Taiwan from 1993 to 1997. Tallest building completed in Taipei in the 1990s.
6	Far Eastern Mega Tower (百揚大樓)		Banqiao; New Taipei City; 25°00′47″N 121°28′01″E	220.6 (724)	50	2013	Mixed	Tallest building in Banqiao District and New Taipei.
7	Cathay Landmark (國泰置地廣場)		Xinyi; Taipei; 25°02′26″N 121°34′01″E	212 (696)	46	2015	Office	
8	Farglory Financial Center (遠雄金融中心)		Xinyi; Taipei; 25°02′23″N 121°33′51″E	208.3 (683)	32	2012	Office	
9	Eastern Group Headquarters (東森恩典大樓)		Linkou; New Taipei City; 25°03′59″N 121°21′50″E	199 (653)	38	2025	Office	Tallest building in Linkou District.
10	Neo Sky Dome Block B (新巨蛋 B棟)		Banqiao; New Taipei City; 25°01′25″N 121°28′09″E	188 (617)	46	2010	Residential	Tallest residential building in Taipei.
11	Farglory 95rich (遠雄九五)		Xinzhuang; New Taipei City; 25°03′36″N 121°27′07″E	184 (604)	42	2017	Mixed	Tallest building in Xinzhuang District.
12	Chicony Electronics Headquarters (群光電子總部大樓)		Sanchong; New Taipei City; 25°03′24″N 121°28′22″E	181 (594)	39	2015	Office	Tallest building in Sanchong District.
13	i-Tower (宏匯i-Tower)		Xinzhuang; New Taipei City; 25°03′30″N 121°27′33″E	180.6 (593)	39	2021	Office	
14	Panhsin Twin Towers (板信雙子星花園廣場)		Banqiao; New Taipei City; 25°00′44″N 121°27′48″E	180 (590)	34	2009	Office	
15	Four Seasons Hotel Taipei (臺北四季酒店)		Xinyi; Taipei; 25°01′56″N 121°33′51″E	179.6 (589)	31	2025	Hotel	
16	Neo Sky Dome Block C (新巨蛋 C棟)		Banqiao; New Taipei City; 25°01′24″N 121°28′10″E	177.5 (582)	46	2010	Residential	
16=	Neo Sky Dome Block D (新巨蛋 D棟)		Banqiao; New Taipei City; 25°01′24″N 121°28′11″E	177.5 (582)	46	2010	Residential	
18	Le M Residence (馥華艾美)		Banqiao; New Taipei City; 25°00′49″N 121°28′16″E	172 (564)	46	2025	Residential	
19	Far Eastern Plaza Tower 1 (遠企中心)		Daan; Taipei; 25°01′36″N 121°32′58″E	164.7 (540)	41	1994	Office	Tallest building in Daan district as well as the tallest twin towers in Taipei.
20	Far Eastern Plaza Tower 2 (遠企中心)		Daan; Taipei; 25°01′34″N 121°32′58″E	164.7 (540)	41	1994	Hotel	
21	Sunland 41 Tower A (森聯摩天41 A棟)		Linkou; New Taipei City; 25°04′02″N 121°21′38″E	160.8 (528)	41	2020	Residential	Tallest residential building in New Taipei.
22	Sunland 41 Tower B (森聯摩天41 B棟)		Linkou; New Taipei City; 25°04′05″N 121°21′39″E	160.8 (528)	41	2020	Residential	
23	Yihwa International Residential Tower A (宜華國際飯店住宅A)		Zhongshan; Taipei; 25°04′53″N 121°33′33″E	160 (520)	45	2014	Residential	Tallest building in Zhongshan District.
24	Yihwa International Residential Tower B (宜華國際飯店住宅B)		Zhongshan; Taipei; 25°04′53″N 121°33′36″E	160 (520)	45	2014	Residential	
25	Farglory U-Town Tower B (汐止遠雄U-TOWN B棟)		Xizhi; New Taipei City; 25°03′44″N 121°38′57″E	160 (520)	37	2014	Mixed	Tallest building in Xizhi District.
26	Farglory U-Town Tower C (汐止遠雄U-TOWN C棟)		Xizhi; New Taipei City; 25°03′43″N 121°38′55″E	160 (520)	37	2014	Mixed	
27	The Crystal Plaza (淡水水立方)		Tamsui; New Taipei City; 25°09′37″N 121°27′22″E	160 (520)	41	2012	Residential	Tallest building in Tamsui District. Also known as Water Cube.
28	He-huan Landmark Tower A (合環Landmark A棟)		Xindian; New Taipei City; 24°58′32″N 121°32′44″E	157 (515)	42	2025	Residential	Joint tallest building in Xindian District.
29	He-huan Landmark Tower B (合環Landmark B棟)		Xindian; New Taipei City; 24°58′33″N 121°32′41″E	157 (515)	42	2025	Residential	Joint tallest building in Xindian District.
30	Huaku Sky Garden (華固天鑄)		Shilin; Taipei; 25°07′04″N 121°31′53″E	156.7 (514)	38	2016	Residential	Tallest building in Shilin District.
31	Neo Sky Dome Block A (新巨蛋 A棟)		Banqiao; New Taipei City; 25°01′25″N 121°28′08″E	156 (512)	40	2010	Residential	
32	Hua Nan Bank Headquarters (華南銀行總行世貿大樓)		Xinyi; New Taipei City; 25°02′03″N 121°34′09″E	154.5 (507)	27	2014	Office	
33	Uni-President International Tower (統一國際大樓)		Xinyi Taipei 25°02′23″N 121°33′55″E	154 (505)	30	2003	Office	Also known as President Enterprise Corporation Tower
34	Tuntex Highrise Building (摩天東帝市)		Zhonghe; New Taipei City; 24°59′33″N 121°30′58″E	153 (502)	41	1998	Residential	Tallest building in Zhonghe District.
35	Farglory U-Town Tower D (汐止遠雄U-TOWN D棟)		Xizhi; New Taipei City; 25°03′43″N 121°38′52″E	151.8 (498)	37	2014	Mixed	
36	Farglory U-Town Tower A (汐止遠雄U-TOWN A棟)		Xizhi; New Taipei City; 25°03′44″N 121°38′59″E	151.8 (498)	37	2014	Mixed	
37	Kee Tai Zhongxiao (基泰忠孝)		Zhongzheng; Taipei; 25°02′48″N 121°30′50″E	151.5 (497)	37	2019	Mixed	
38	W Hotel (市府轉運站)		Xinyi; Taipei; 25°02′26″N 121°33′54″E	151 (495)	31	2011	Office	
39	Yihwa International Hotel (宜華國際觀光旅館C)		Zhongshan; Taipei; 25°04′51″N 121°33′32″E	150 (492)	42	2014	Hotel	

== Tallest under construction or proposed ==
=== Under construction ===
The following table ranks skyscrapers that are under construction in Taipei and New Taipei City that are expected to be at least 150 m (492 ft) tall as of 2026, based on standard height measurement. The “Year” column indicates the expected year of completion. Buildings that are on hold are not included. A dash (–) indicates the information is unknown or has not been released.

=== Proposed ===
The following table ranks proposed and approved skyscrapers in Taipei and New Taipei City that are expected to be at least 150m (492 ft). The “Year” column indicates the expected year of completion. A dash (–) indicates the information is unknown or has not been released.

Rank	Name	Location	Height m (ft)	Floors	Year	Status
1	Hongsheng Residential and Commercial Building Project (宏盛建設-石牌142案)	Beitou	216.4 (710)	58	–	Proposed
2	CHP Tower (中華郵政塔)	Zhongzheng	203.5 (668)	44	2032	Proposed
3	Junfu International Ximending Project (駿富國際西門町案)	Zhongzheng	167 (548)	46	–	Proposed
4	Taiwan Rail Towers E1 (臺鐵 E1)	Zhongzheng	–	42	–	Proposed
5	Taiwan Rail Towers E2 (臺鐵 E2)	Zhongzheng	–	30	–	Proposed

== Timeline of tallest buildings ==
Name	Image	Period	Height m (ft)	Floors	District
Office of the Governor-General of Taiwan/ Office of the President of the Republic of China (臺灣總督府/中華民國總統府)		1919–1932	60.0	9	Zhongzheng
Kikumoto department store (菊元商行)		1932–1973	Unknown	6	Zhongzheng
Hilton Hotel Taipei (臺北希爾頓大飯店)		July 15–October 10, 1973	71	20	Zhongzheng
Grand Hotel (圓山大飯店)		Oct. 10, 1973–1981	87	12	Zhongshan
First Commercial Bank Building (第一銀行總行大樓)		1981–1983	87.7	22	Zhongzheng
Taiwan Power Building (台電大樓)		1983–1988	127.4	27	Zhongzheng
TWTC International Trade Building (國貿大樓)		1988–1990	142.6	33	Xinyi
Tuntex Tower (敦南東帝士大樓)		1990–1993	143.4	38	Daan
Shin Kong Life Tower (新光人壽保險大樓)		1993–2004	244.8	51	Zhongzheng
Taipei 101 (臺北101)		2004–present	508	101	Xinyi

== Skylines ==
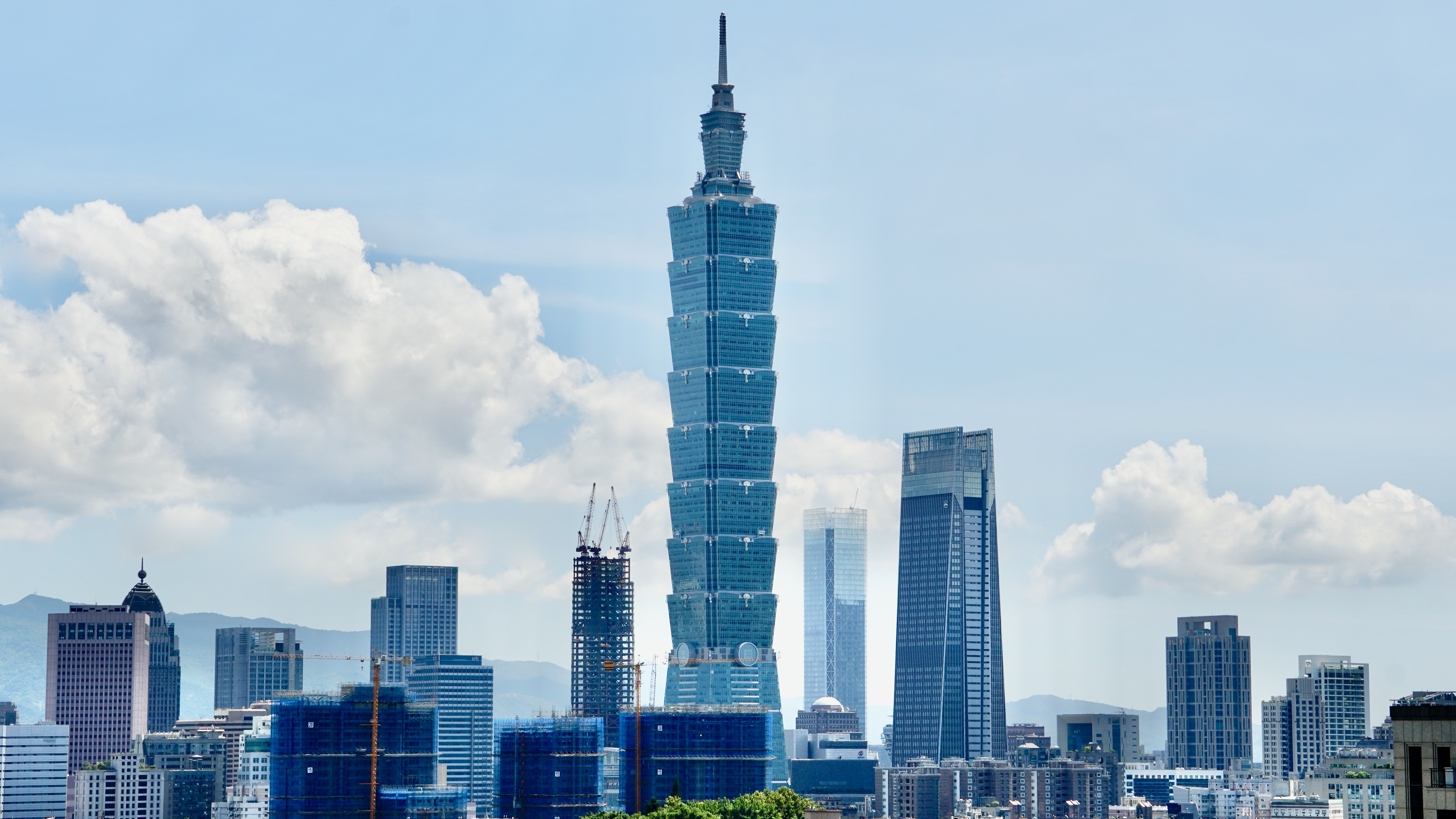
Xinyi

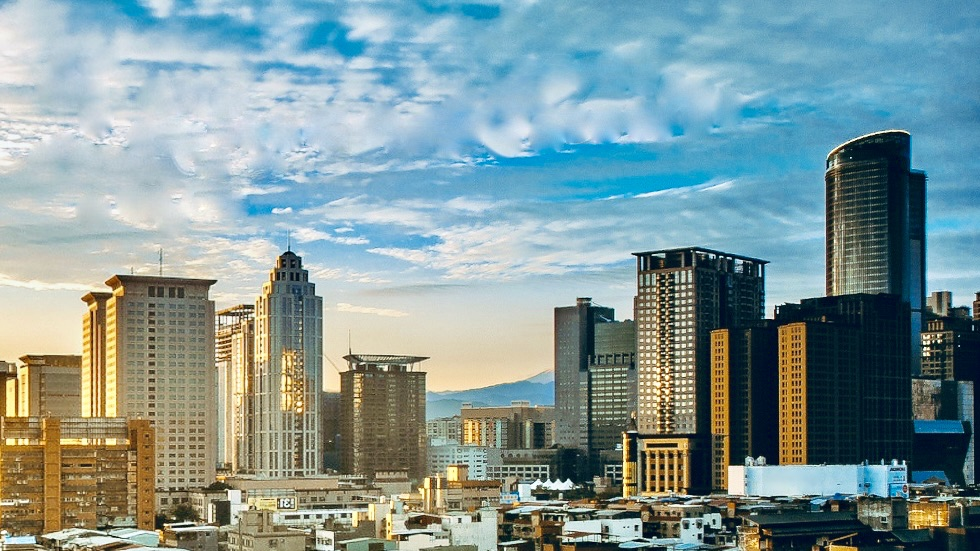
Banqiao

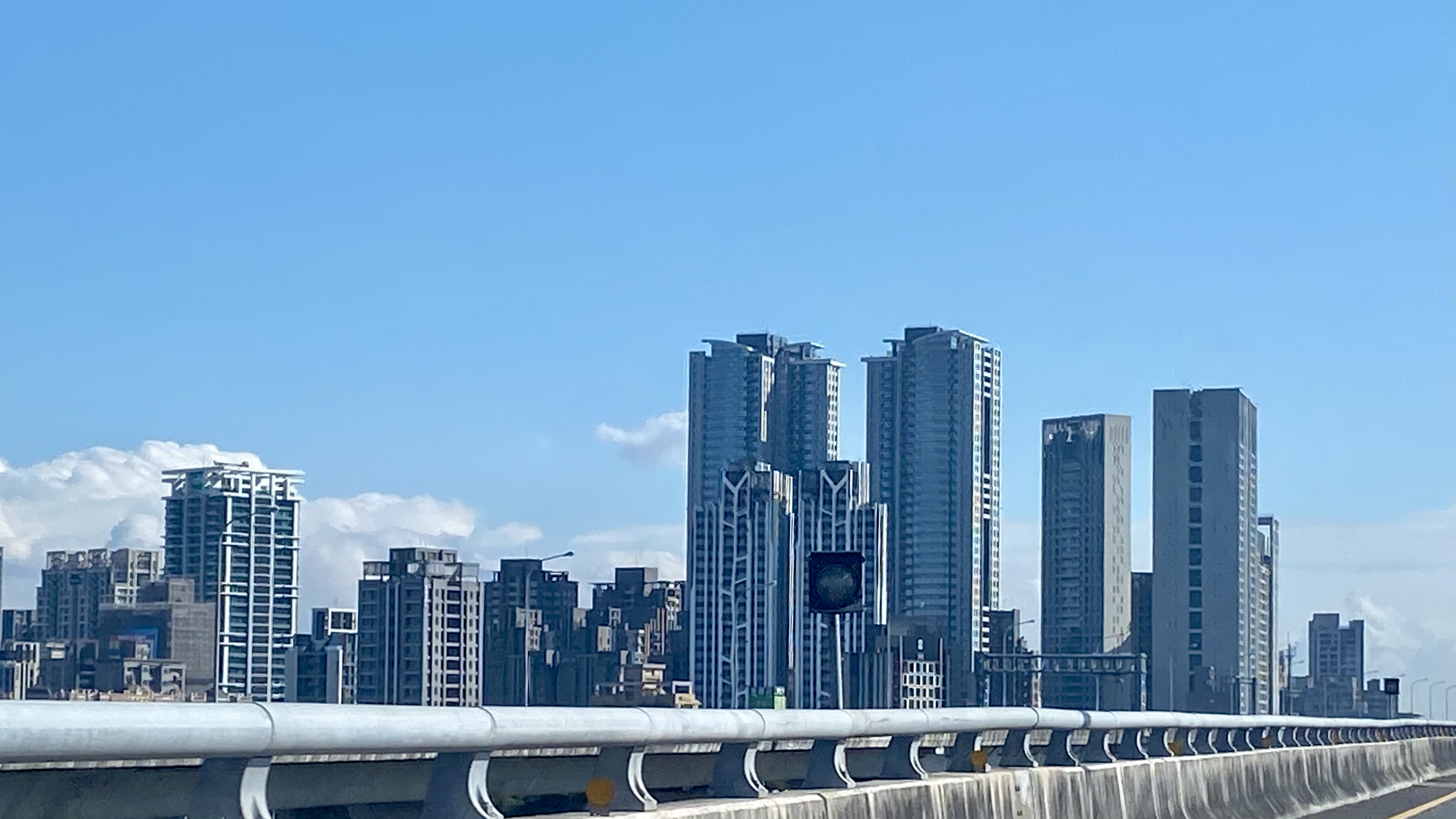
Linkou

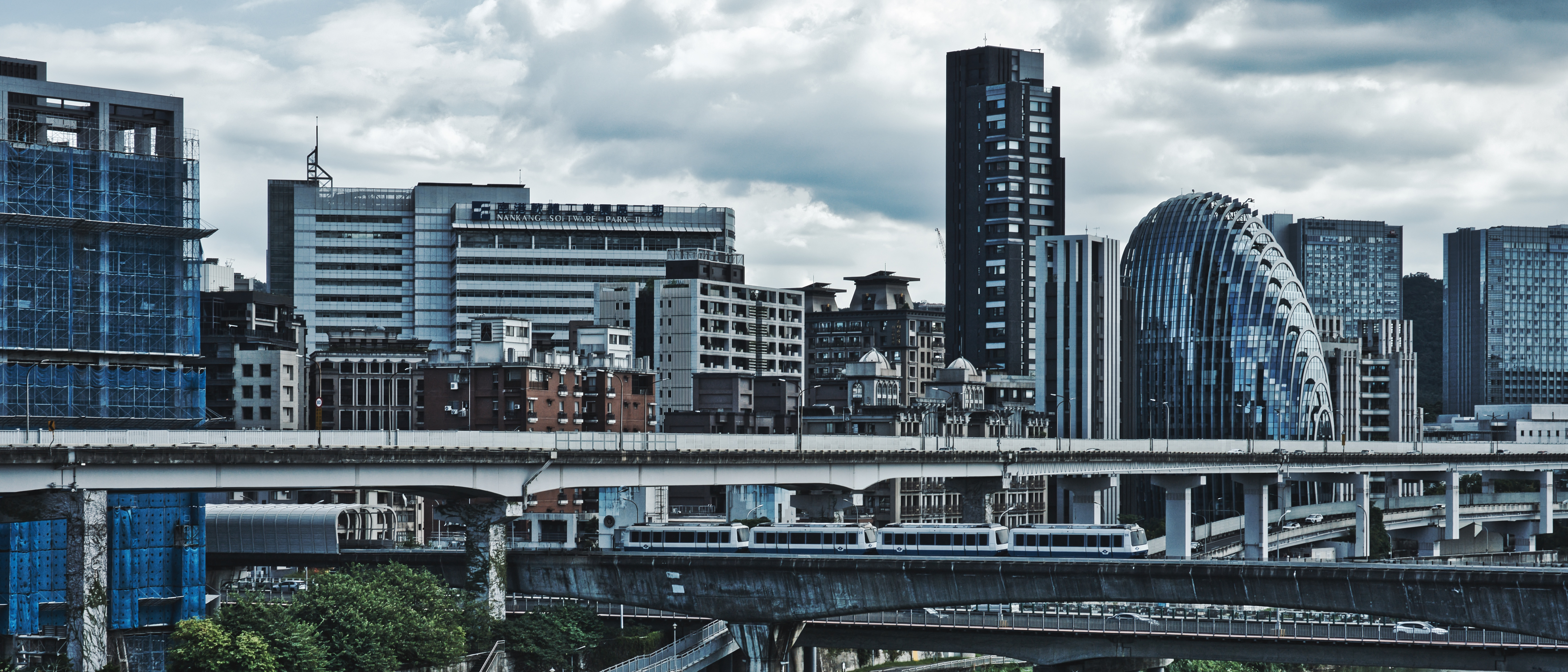
Nangang

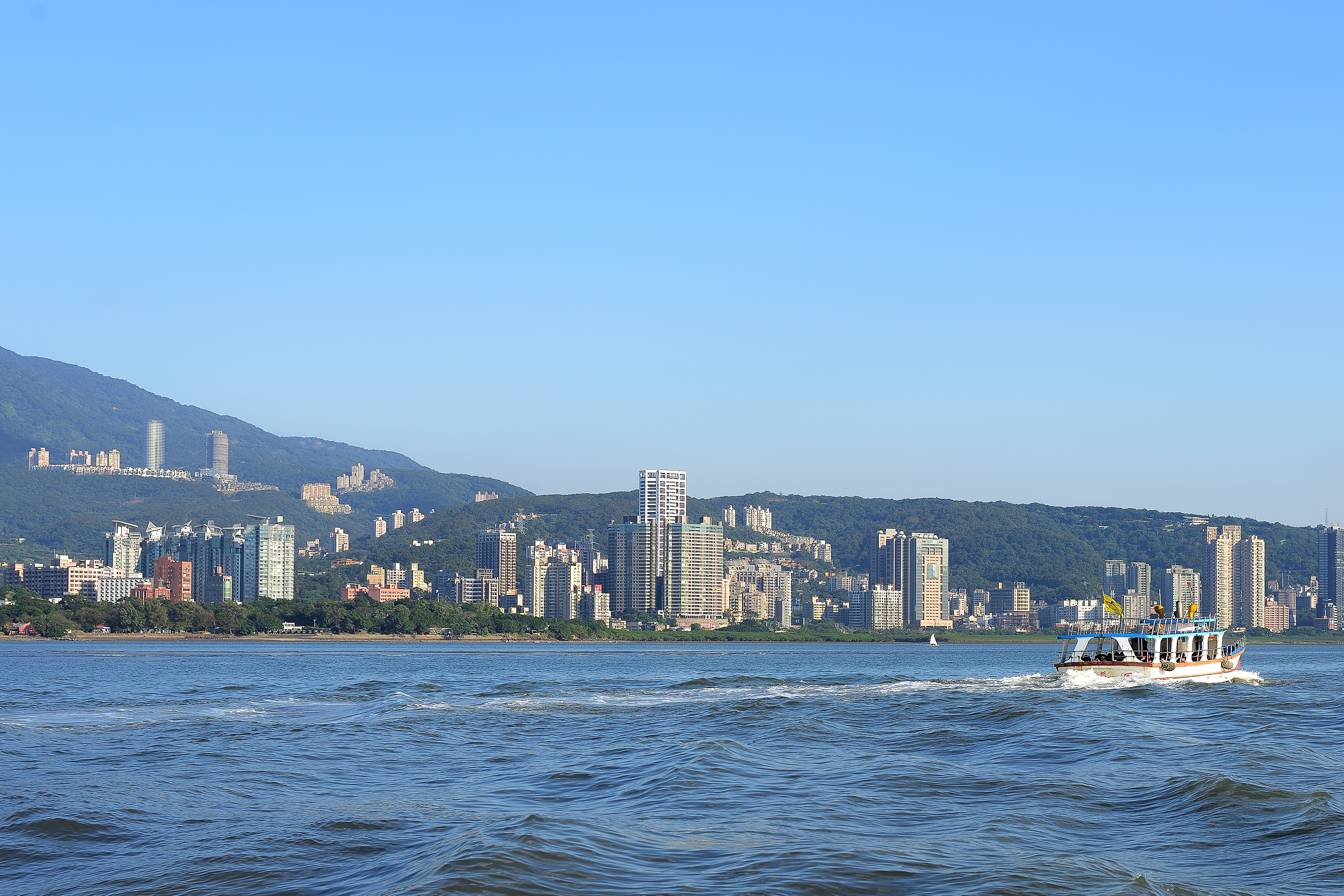
Tamsui

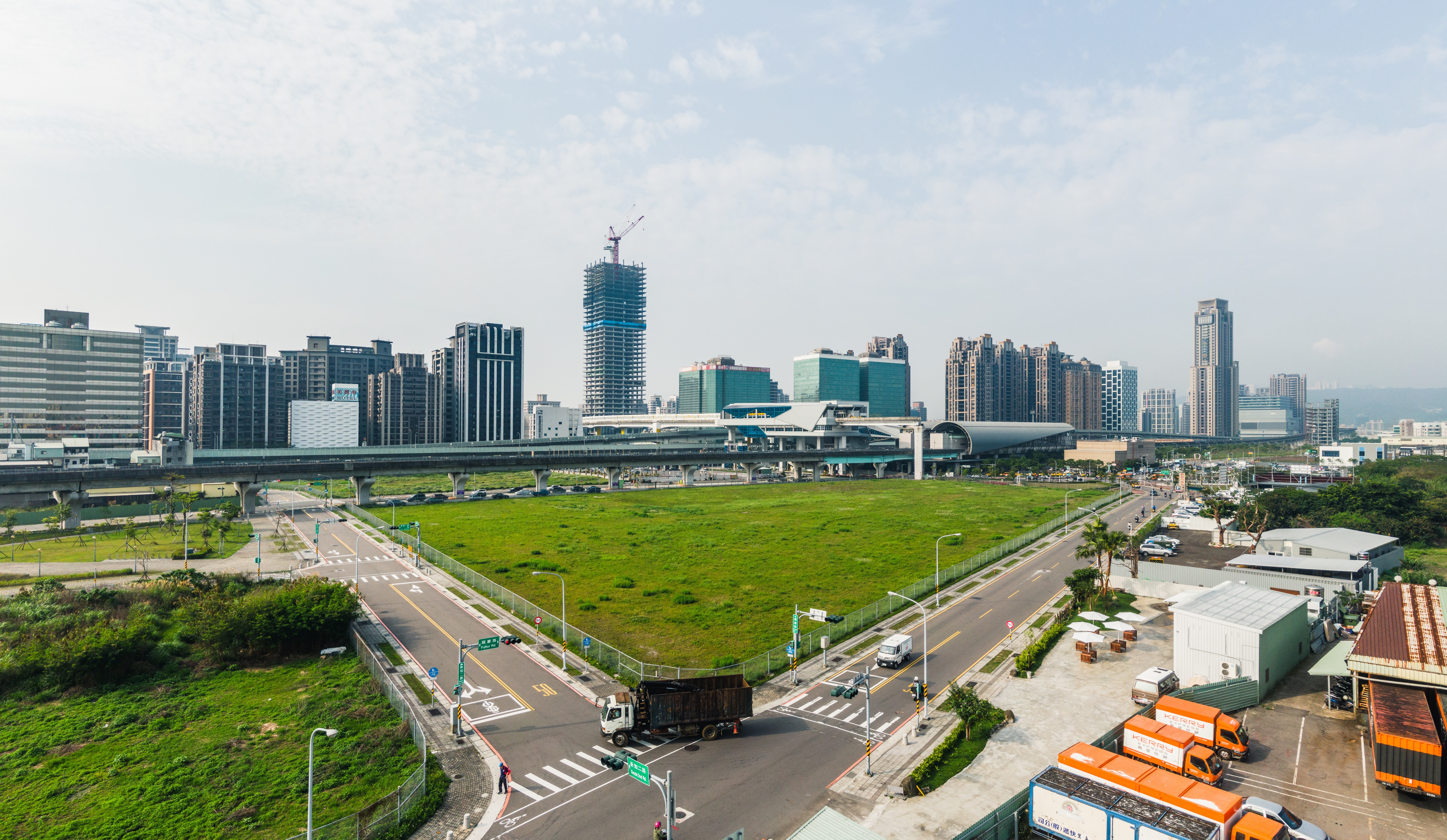
Xinzhuang

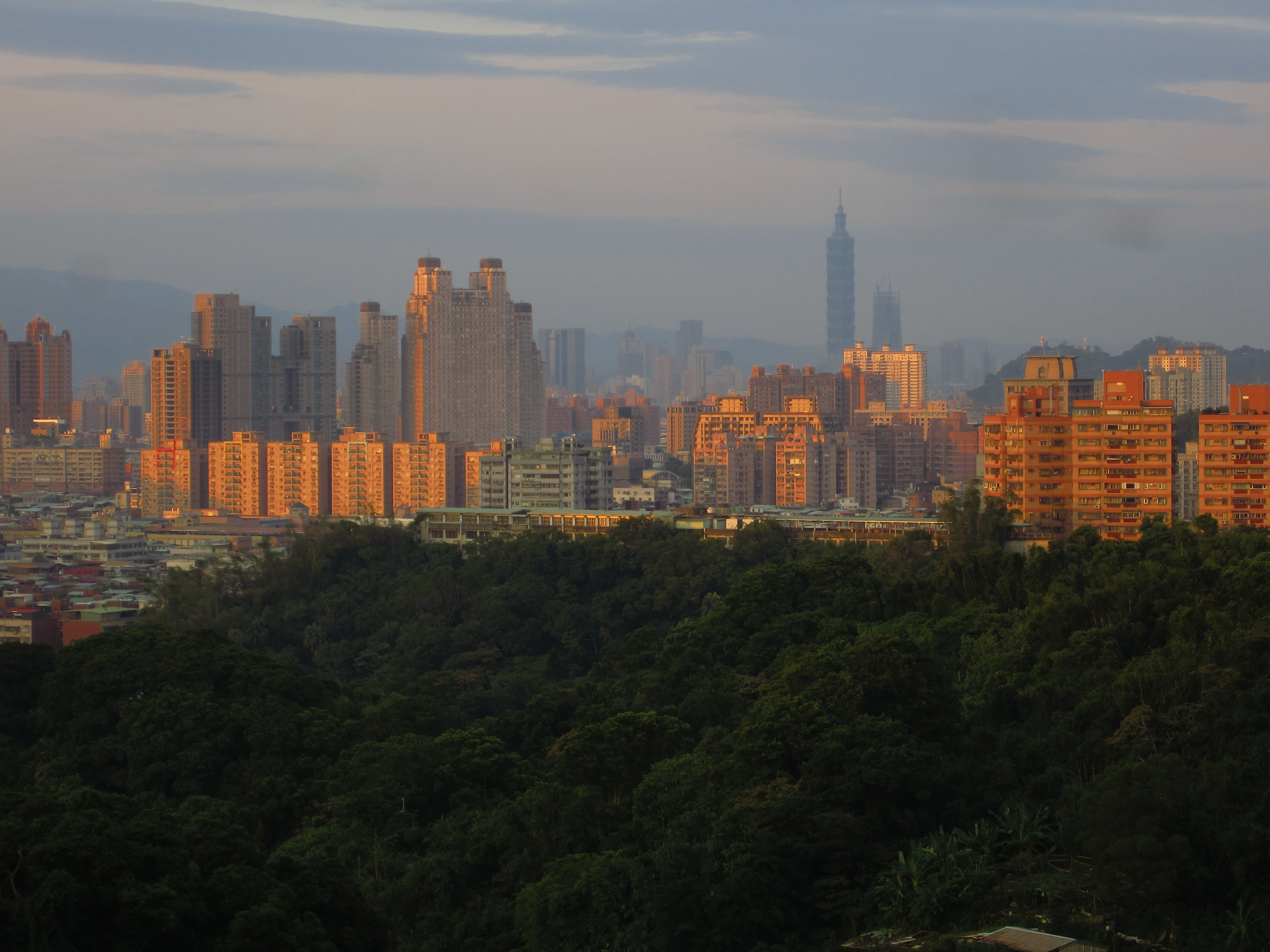
Zhonghe

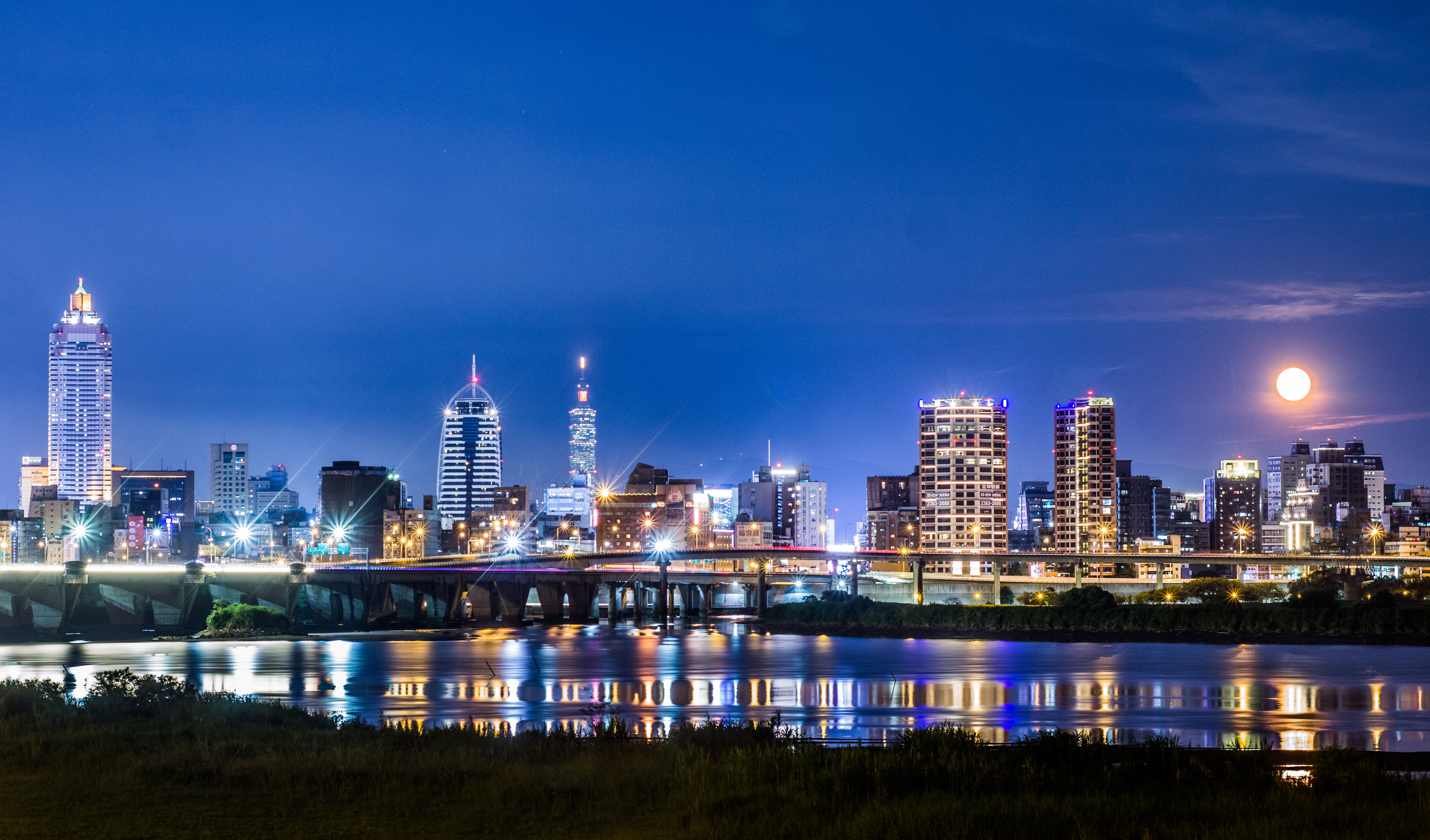
Zhongzheng

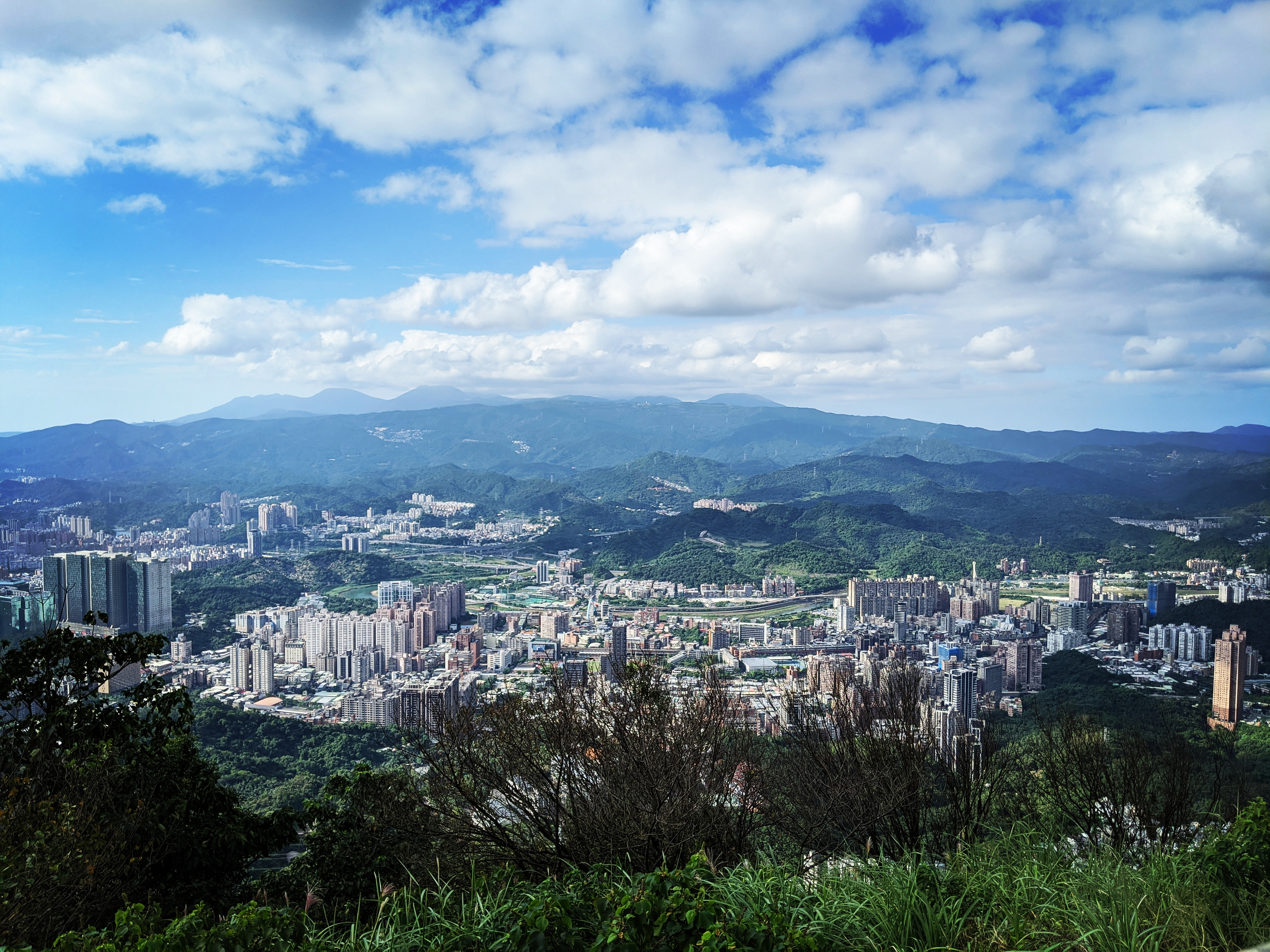
Xizhi

== See also ==
- Architecture of Taiwan
- List of tallest buildings
- List of tallest buildings in Taiwan
- List of tallest buildings in Taichung
- List of tallest buildings in Kaohsiung
