= Eastern Media Group Headquarters =

Skyscraper in New Taipei, Taiwan

- 東森恩典大樓
- Eastern Group Headquarters under construction in January 2025
- Alternative names: Grace Tower

General information
- Status: Topped-out
- Type: Skyscraper
- Location: No. 1, Section 1, Wenhua 2nd Road, Linkou District, New Taipei, Taiwan
- Coordinates: 25°03′59″N 121°21′50″E
- Groundbreaking: 13 April 2022; 4 years ago
- Topped-out: 22 November 2024; 23 months ago
- Completed: December 2026 (estimated)
- Cost: NT$14 billion (US$446.9 million)
- Owner: Eastern Media Group

Height
- Height: 199.0 m (653 ft)

Technical details
- Floor count: 38

Eastern Media Group Headquarters (Chinese: 東森恩典大樓; pinyin: Dōngsēn Ēndiǎn Dàlóu), is a topped-out, 199 m (653 ft), 38-storey skyscraper office building located in Linkou District, New Taipei, Taiwan. The ground breaking ceremony of the building was held on 13 April 2022. It will become the second tallest building in New Taipei and the 13th tallest in Taiwan upon its estimated completion in December 2026. Upon completion, the building will serve as the new headquarters for the Eastern Group. The project hopes to develop the surrounding area into the "Cannes" of Asia by building multifunctional performance and exhibition centers, hotels, enterprise headquarters and commercial facilities on the site. The Eastern Group will introduce new technologies to the park, including artificial intelligence and the Internet of Things, to create a "circle of life" dominated by the audiovisual and music sectors.

== Gallery ==
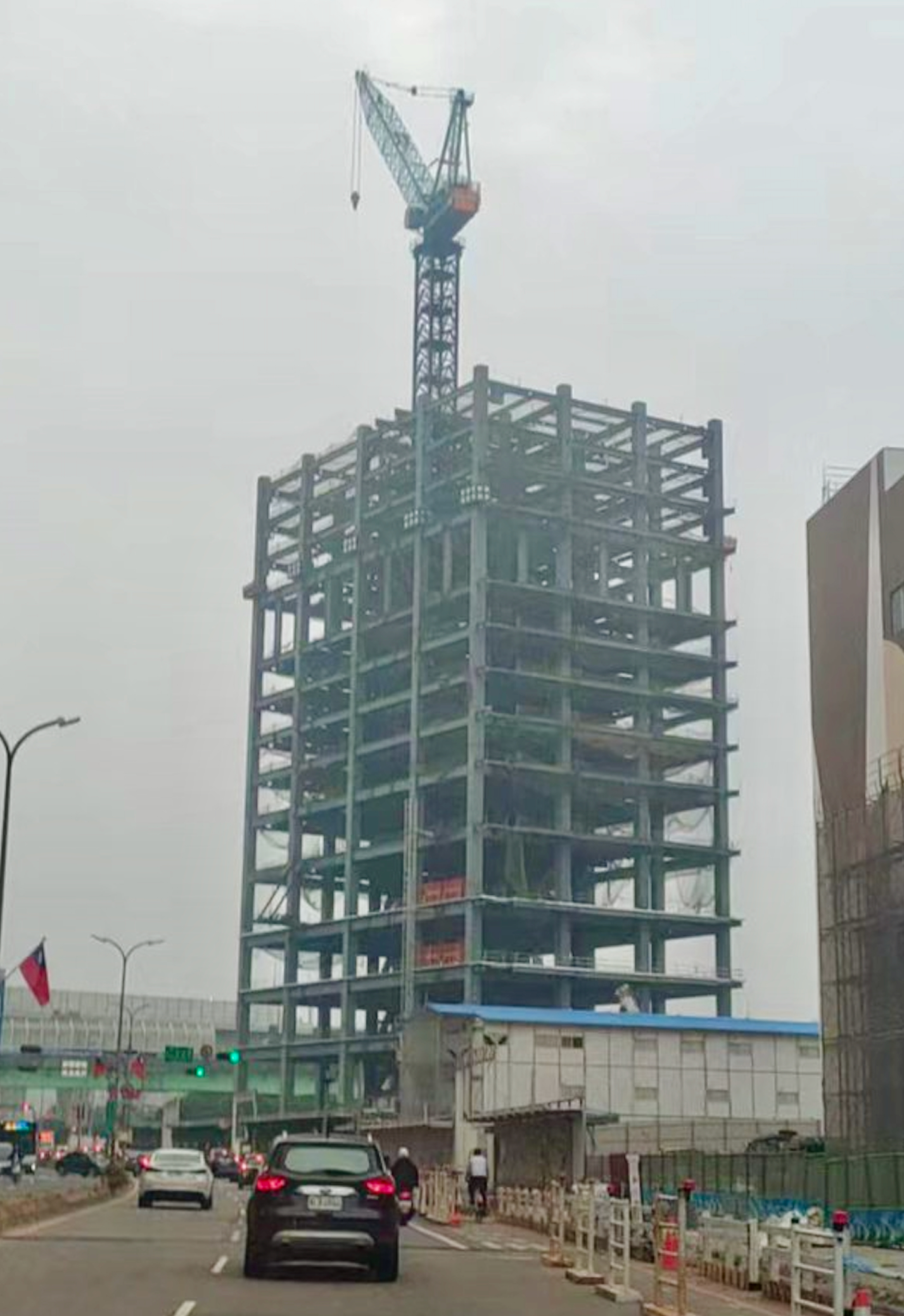
October 2023

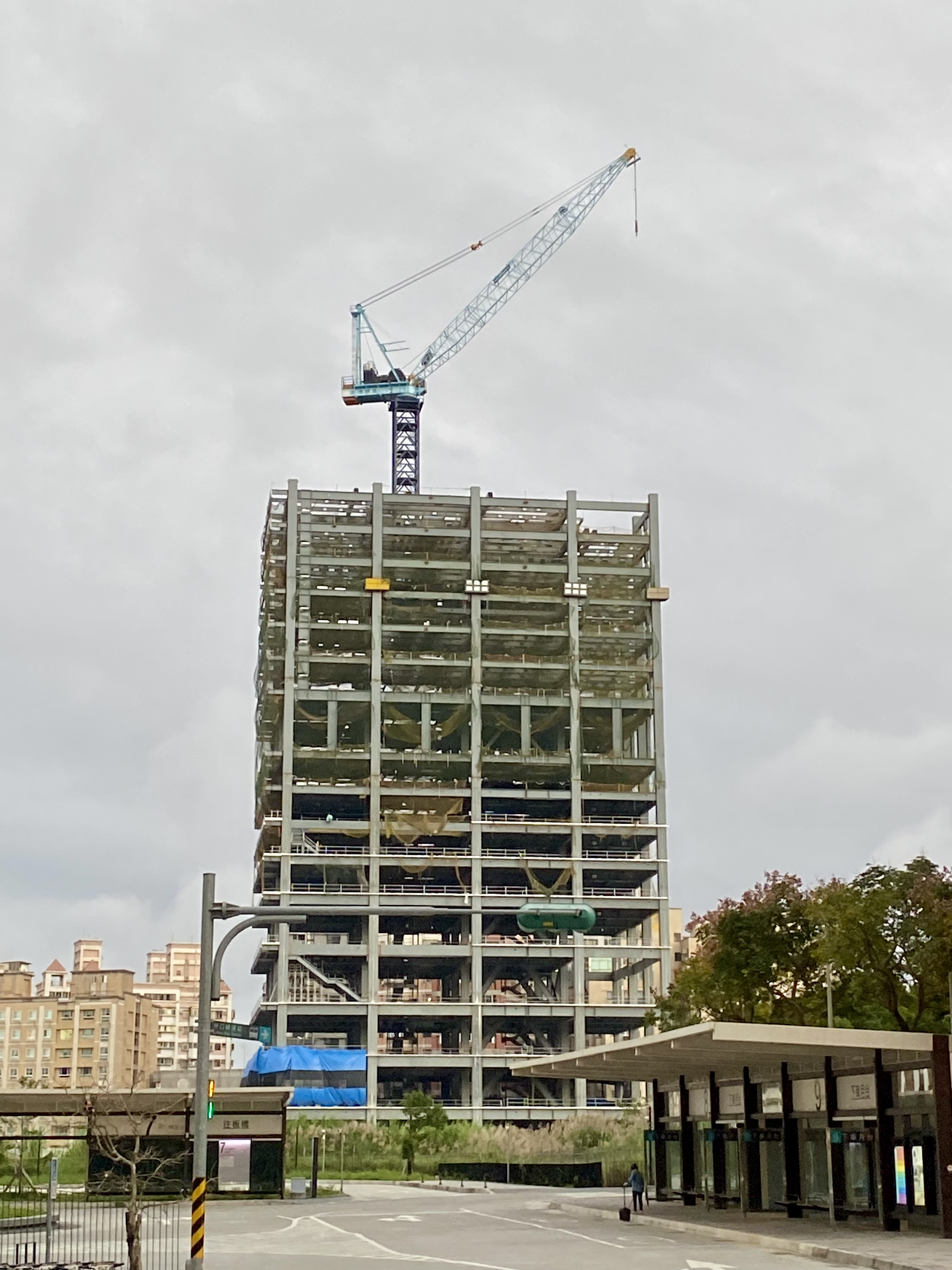
November 2023

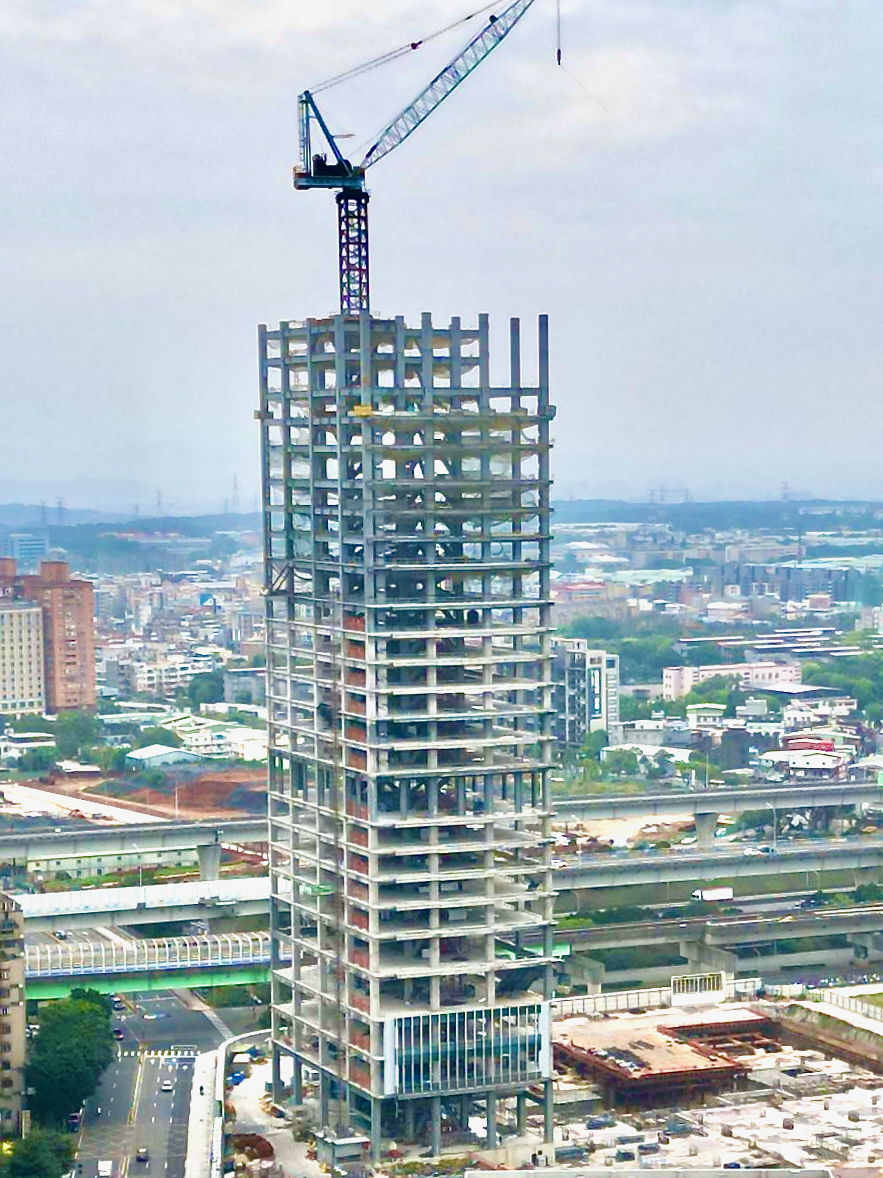
March 2024

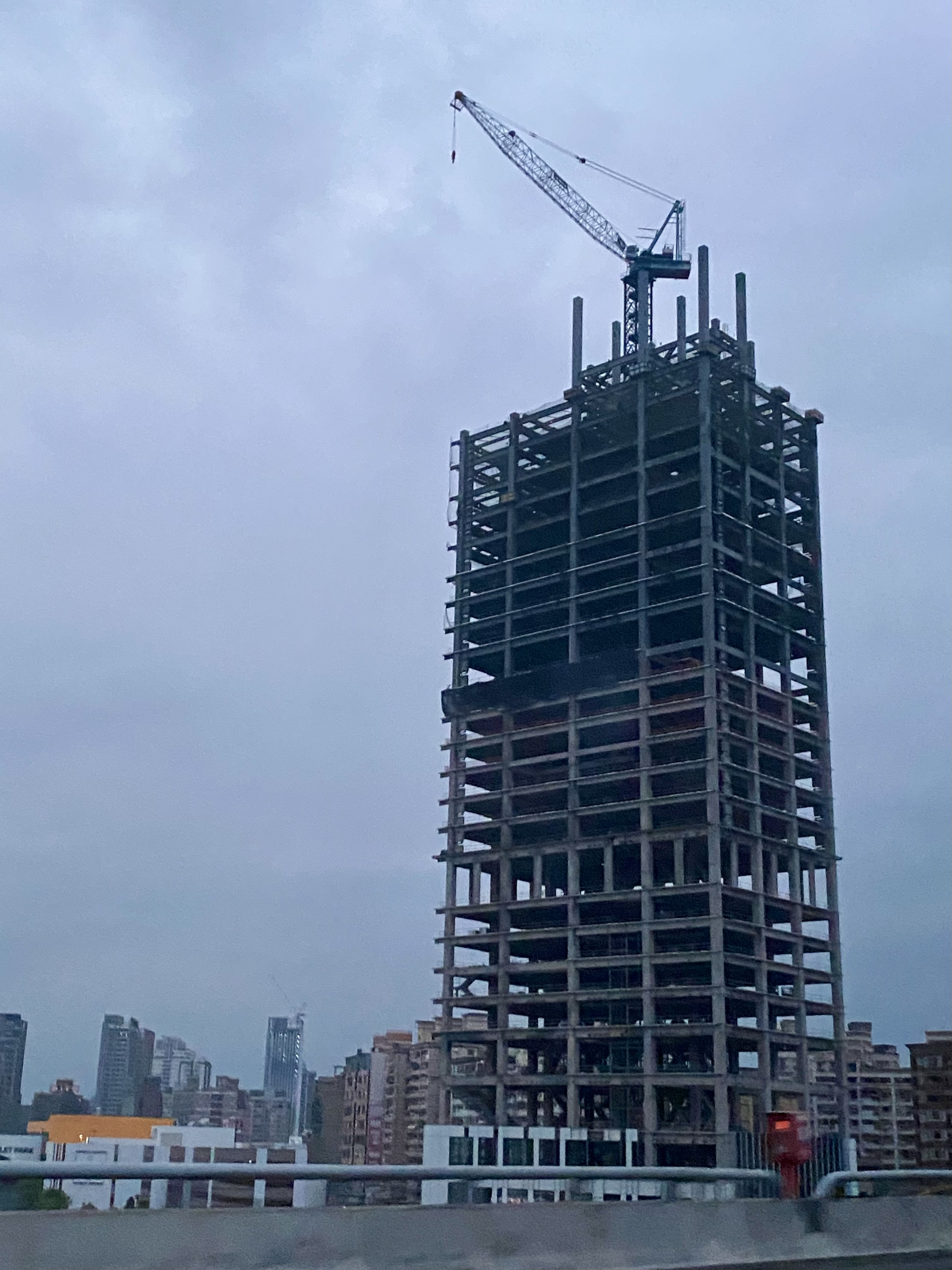
April 2024

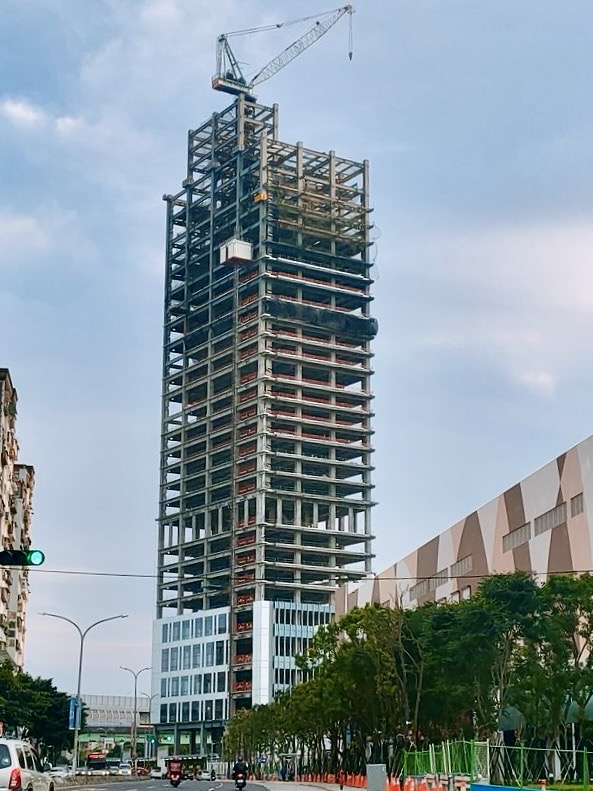
May 2024

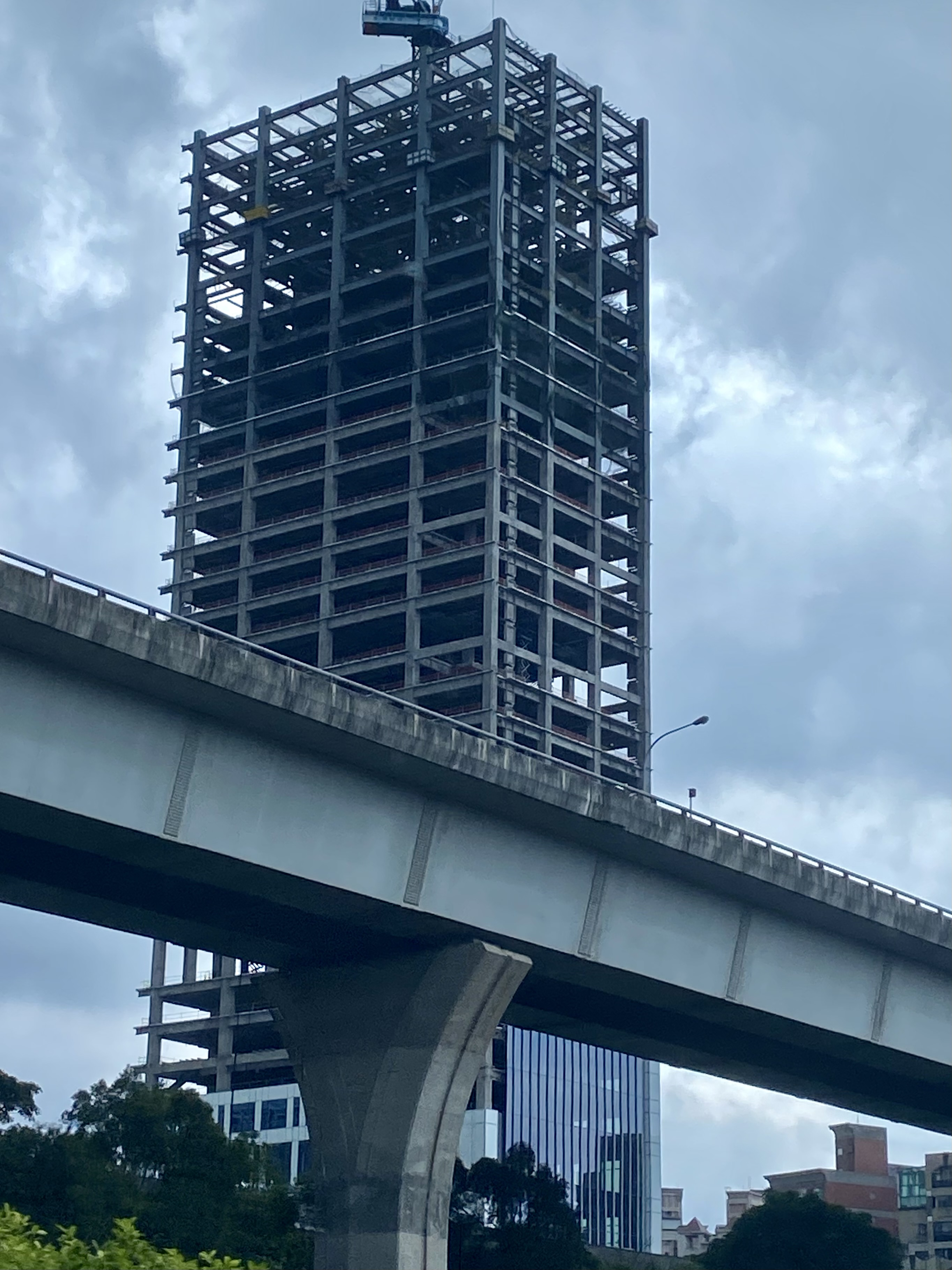
June 2024

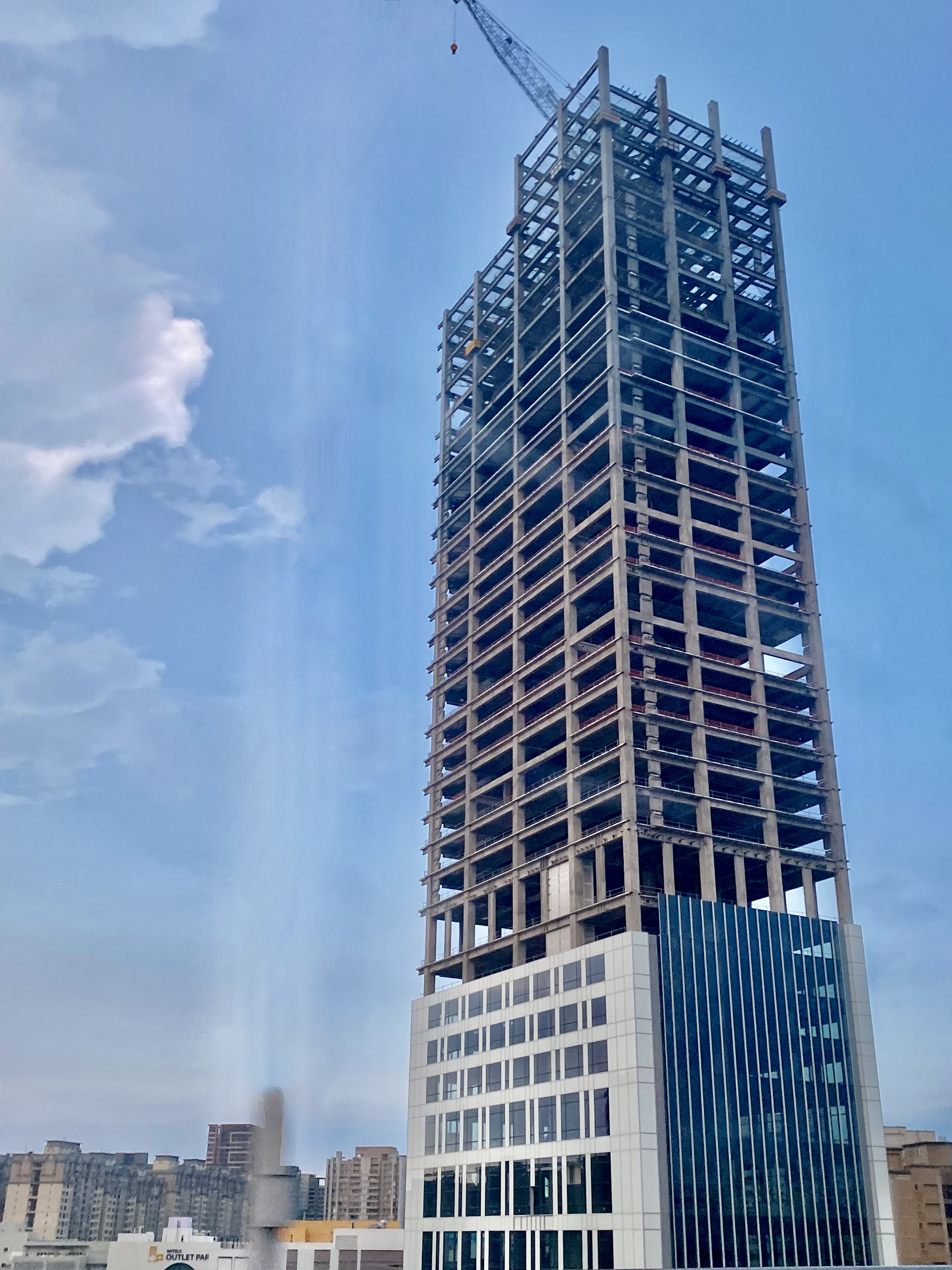
July 2024

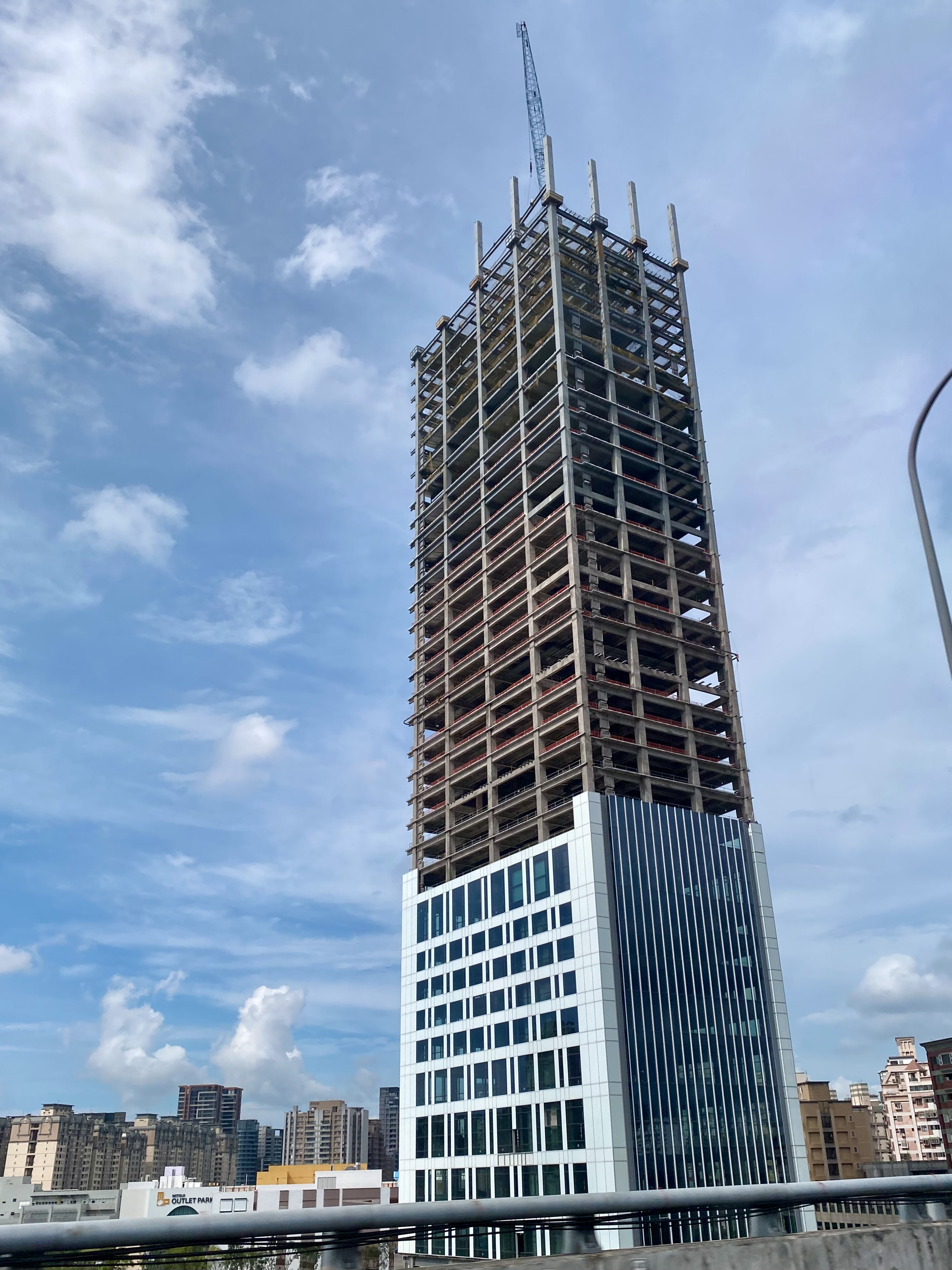
August 2024

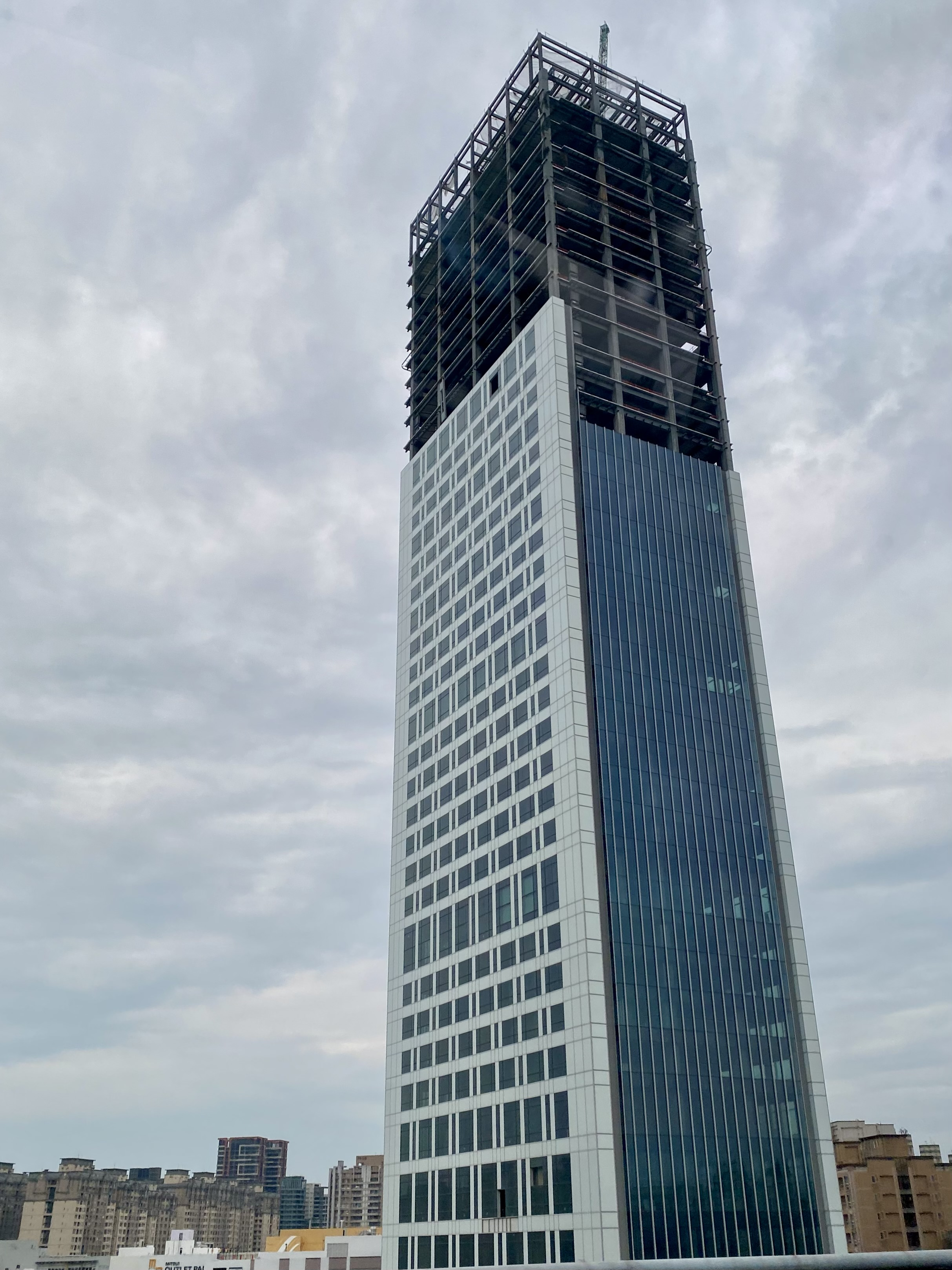
January 2025

November 2026

== See also ==
- List of tallest buildings in Taiwan
- List of tallest buildings in New Taipei
