= Huaku Sky Garden =

Residential skyscraper in Shilin District of Taipei, Taiwan

Huaku Sky Garden 華固天鑄
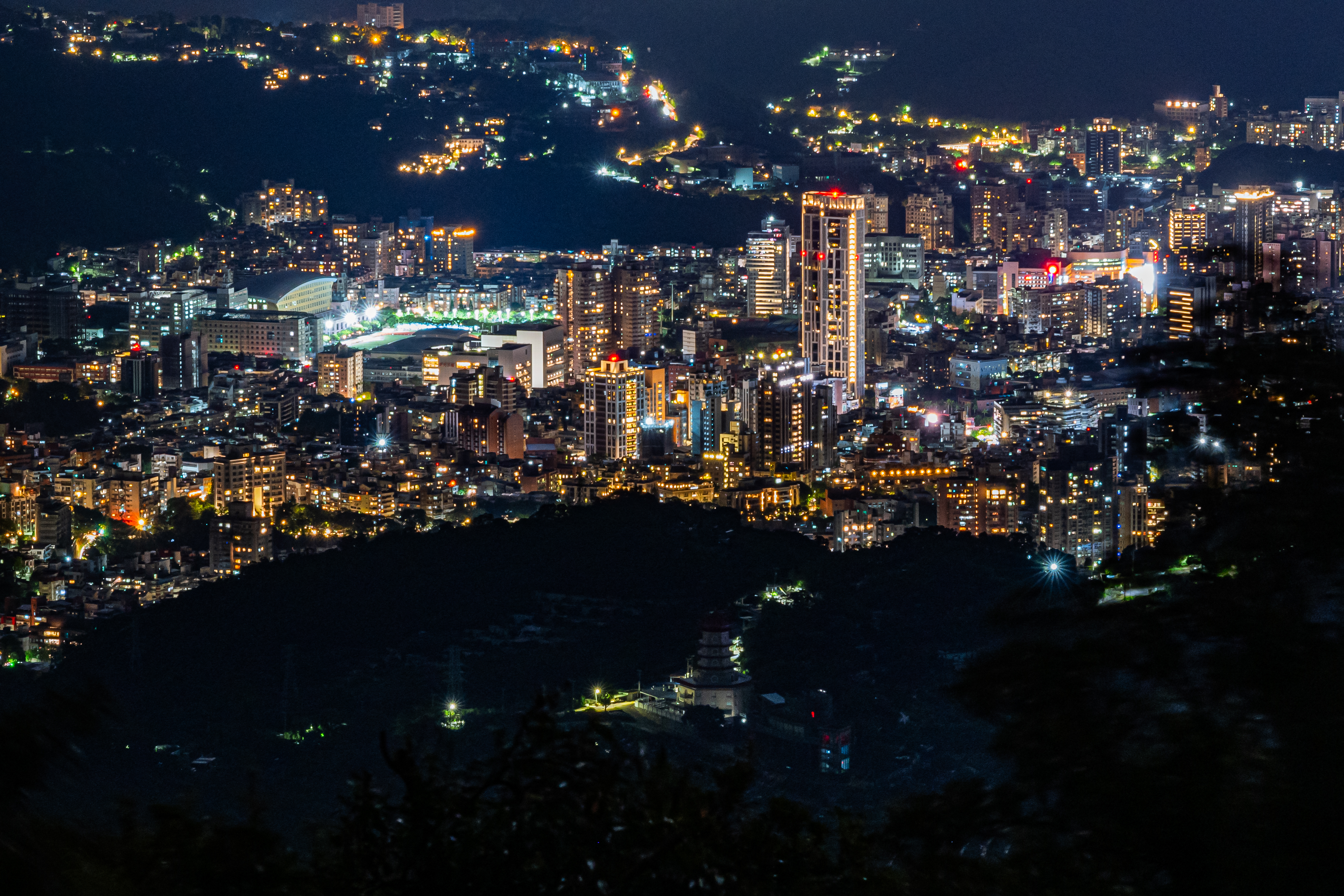
- Huaku Sky Garden (tallest building, center-right) dominating the skyline of Shilin
- Interactive map of the Huaku Sky Garden 華固天鑄 area

General information
- Status: Completed
- Type: Residences
- Location: 8 Tianmu East Road, Shilin District, Taipei, Taiwan
- Coordinates: 25°07′03″N 121°31′51″E
- Completed: 2017

Height
- Tip: 156.7 metres (514 ft)

Technical details
- Floor count: 38
- Floor area: 47,132 m^{2}

Design and construction
- Architect: WOHA

The Huaku Sky Garden (Chinese: 華固天鑄; pinyin: Huá gù tiān zhù) is a residential skyscraper located in Shilin District, Taipei, Taiwan. It is the tallest building in Shilin District, the 46th tallest building in Taiwan and one of the tallest residential buildings in Taipei. The height of the building is 156.7 m (514 ft), the floor area is 47,132 m^{2} (507,320 sq ft), and it comprises 38 floors above the ground, as well as 4 basement levels.

== Design ==
Designed by the Singapore and WOHA architectural team, under the requirements of preventing earthquakes and typhoons common in Taiwan, the symmetrical structural frame was adopted to promote a multi-scale Taiwanese-style folding screen, presented with a super-large structural frame and metal filigree. Each household in the building has an open balcony with a ceiling height of more than seven meters. There is also an indoor heated swimming pool located on the 2nd floor.

== See also ==
- List of tallest buildings in Taiwan
- List of tallest buildings in Taipei
