= Longshan Temple Underground Shopping Mall =

- 龍山寺地下街
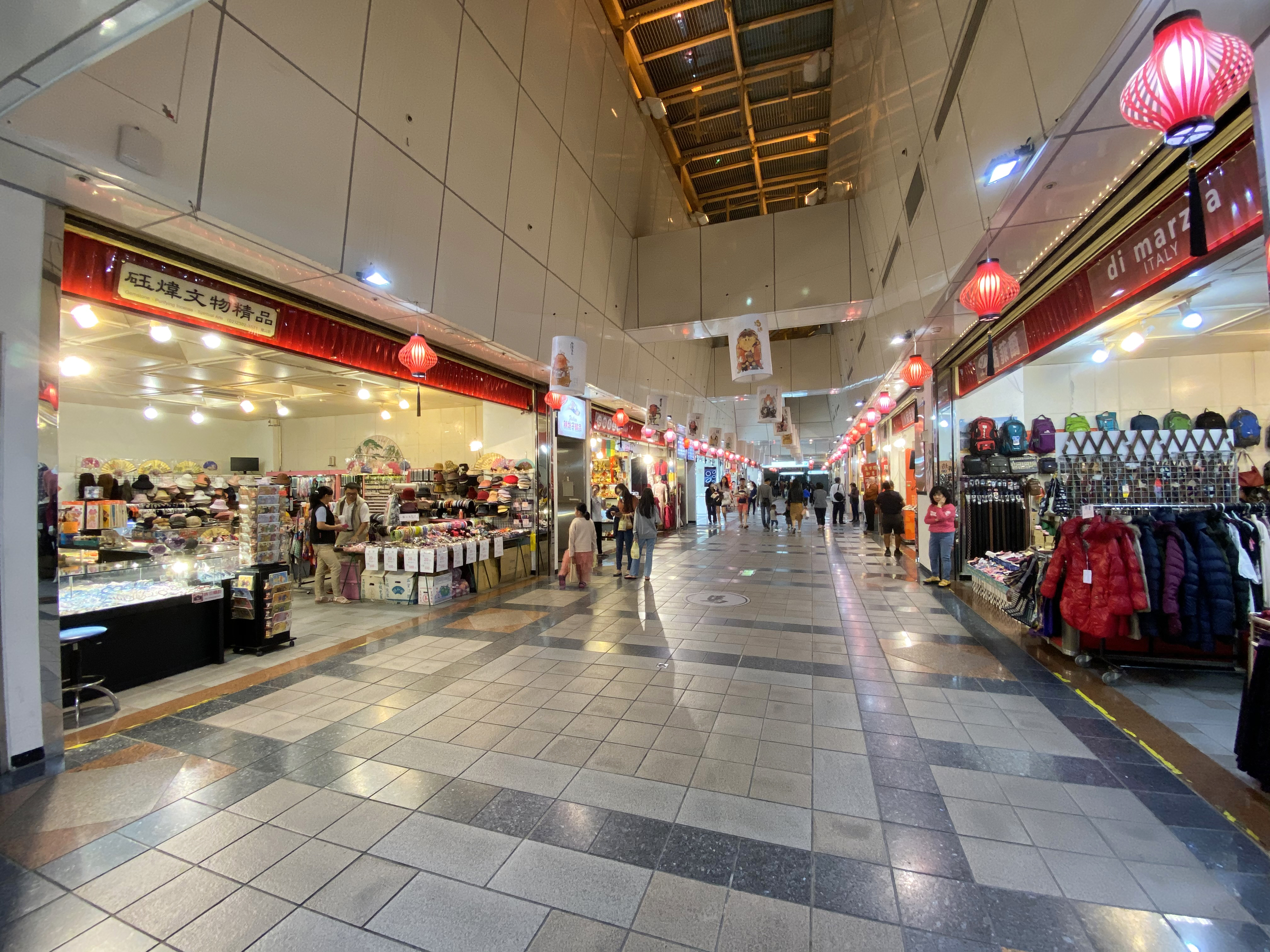
- Location: No.145, Section 1, Xiyuan Road, Wanhua District, Taipei, Taiwan
- Coordinates: 25.03886614489204°N 121.5000045840673°E
- Opened: September 17, 2005
- Floors: 4 floors
- Public transit: Longshan Temple metro station

Longshan Temple Underground Shopping Mall (Chinese: 龍山寺地下街; pinyin: Lóngshānxì Dìxiàjiē) is an underground shopping center located in Wanhua District, Taipei, Taiwan. It is located directly below Bangka Park and is connected with Longshan Temple metro station. There are a total of 7 entrances to access the shopping mall from the ground floor. The mall has four levels. Level B1 is a famous fortune-telling street, where some stores also sell lucky charms and daily necessities; level B2 sells a variety of commodities, such as exquisite cultural goods and snacks, souvenirs, etc. Levels B3 and B4 are used as a public parking lot.

== History ==
- Longshan Temple Underground Shopping Mall officially started operation on September 17, 2005.
- The mall underwent a large renovation starting from January 15, 2019, and reopened at the end of January 2021.

== Gallery ==
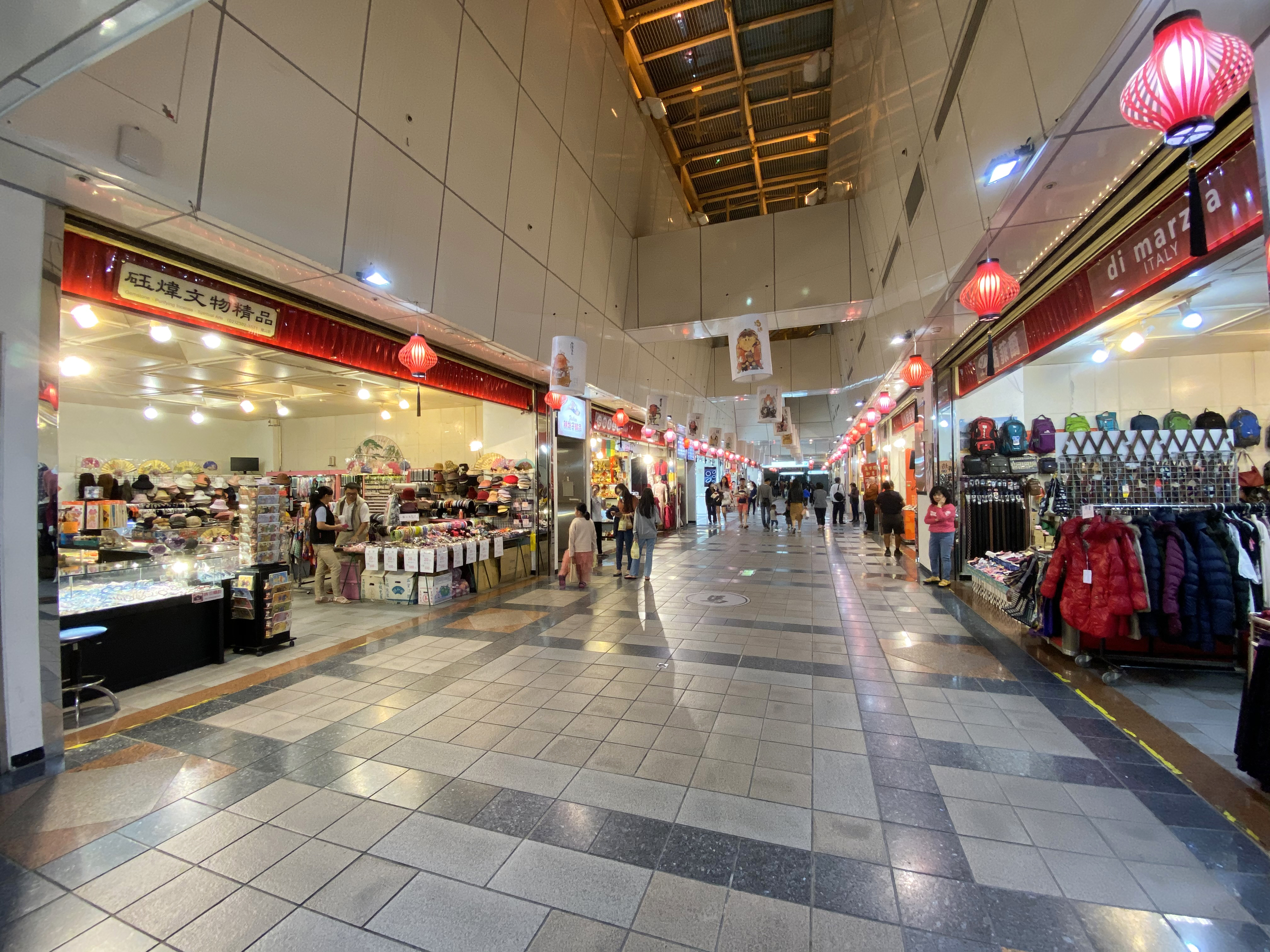
Interior

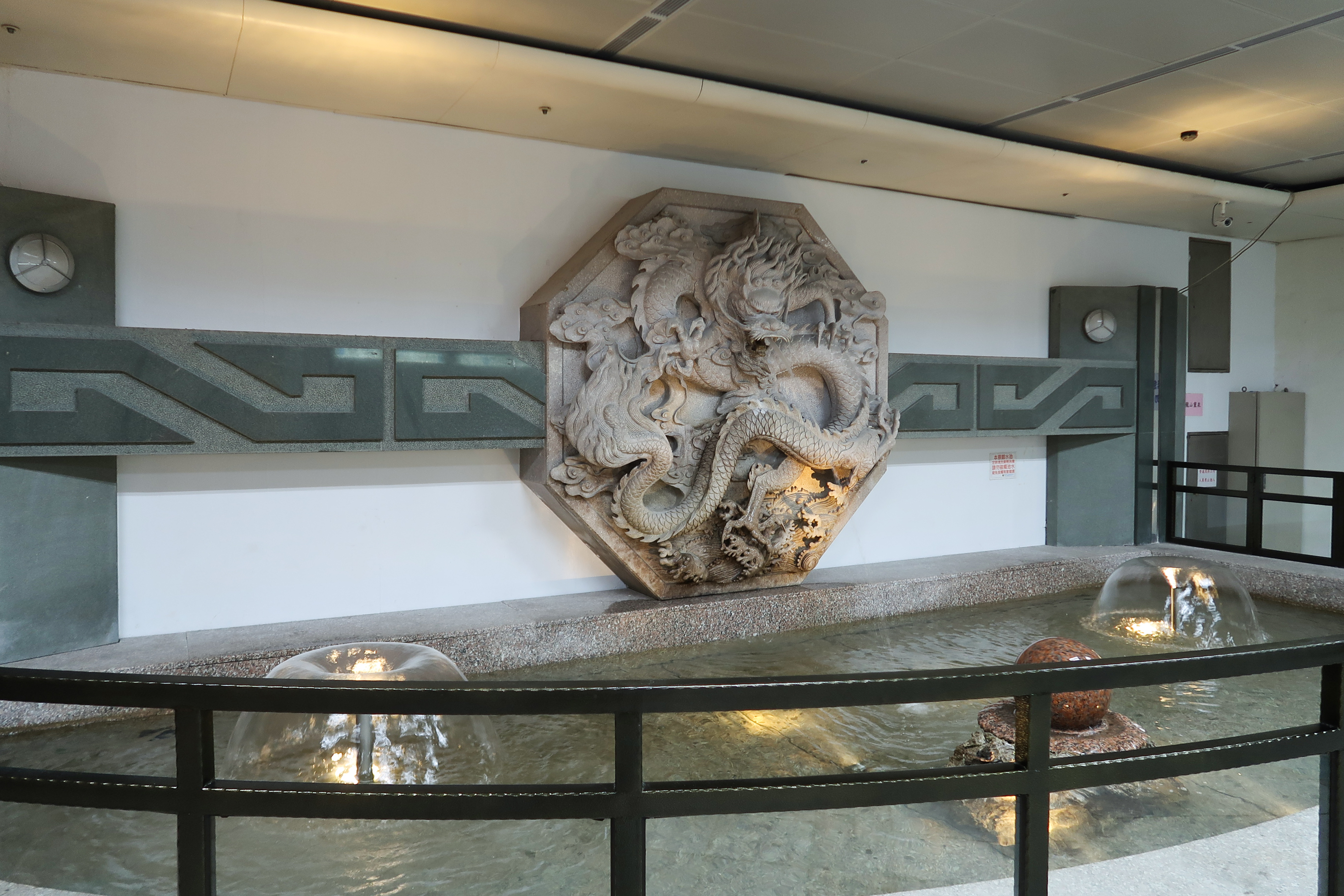
Fountain

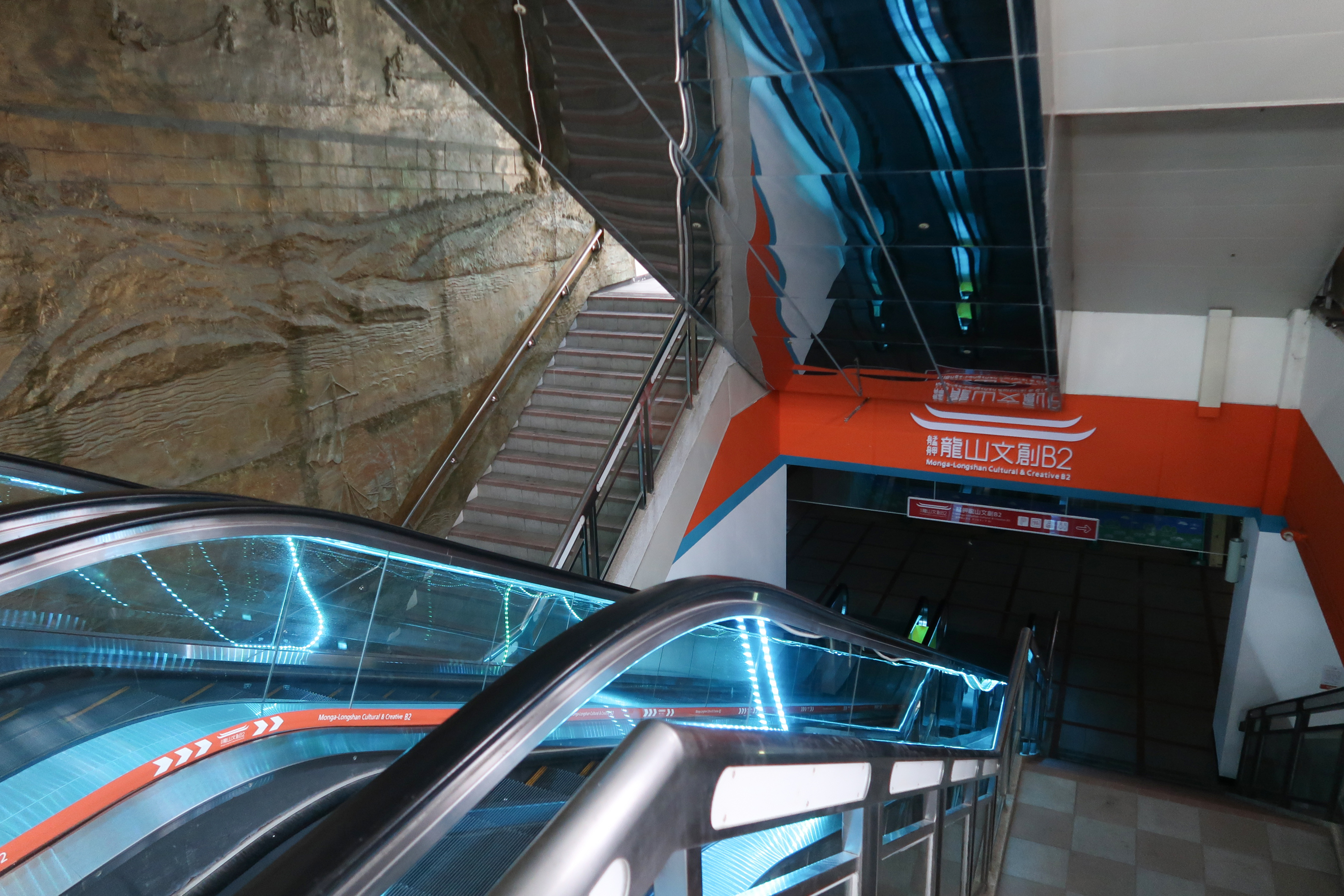
Level B2 closed for renovation

== See also ==
- Zhongshan Metro Mall
- Taipei City Mall
- East Metro Mall
- Ximen Metro Mall
- Station Front Metro Mall
- List of shopping malls in Taipei
