= List of shopping malls in Taipei =

This is a list of notable shopping malls/shopping centres in Taipei, Taiwan.

== Eastern District ==
=== Zhongxiao E. Rd. ===
- Pacific Sogo (Zhongxiao Branch)
- Pacific Sogo (Fuxing Branch)
- Ming Yao Department Store
- Breeze II
- Tonlin Plaza
- East Metro Mall

=== Fuxing S. Rd. ===
- Breeze Center
- Sunrise Department Store
- Howard Boutiques

=== Dunhua Rd. ===
- Pacific Sogo (Dunhua Branch)
- Asiaworld Shopping Mall
- Eslite Dunnan Branch
- Momo
- The Mall

=== Xinyi District ===
- Shin Kong Mitsukoshi Xinyi Place - A4, A8, A9, A11
- Vieshow Cinemas
- Taipei 101
- BELLAVITA
- FEDS Xinyi A13
- Neo19
- Eslite Xinyi Flagship Store
- ATT 4 FUN
- Citylink Songshan
- Hankyu Department Store
- Breeze Nanshan
- Breeze Song Gao
- Breeze Xinyi
- Dream Plaza
- Garden City

=== Nangang District ===
- Citylink Nangang
- CTBC Financial Park Mall
- Global Mall Nangang Station
- Mitsui Shopping Park LaLaport Taipei Nangang

== Western District ==
=== Nanjing W. Rd. ===
- Shin Kong Mitsukoshi Nanxi
- Idee Department Store
- Breeze Nan Jing
- Shin Shin Department Store

=== Zhongxiao W. Rd. ===
- Shin Kong Mitsukoshi (Taipei Station Branch)
- KMall
- Longshan Temple Underground Shopping Mall
- Nova
- Breeze Taipei Station
- Qsquare
- Syntrend Creative Park
- Station Front Metro Mall
- Taipei City Mall
- Ximen Metro Mall
- Zhongshan Metro Mall

=== Ximending ===
- Eslite Ximen Branch
- Eslite Wuchang Branch
- Eslite 116
- FE21 Department Store
- Jun Plaza

=== Dazhi ===
- ATT e Life
- Miramar Entertainment Park
- NOKE

== Northern District ==
- Citylink Neihu

=== Tianmu ===
- Shin Kong Mitsukoshi Tianmu
- Dayeh Takashimaya
- Pacific Sogo (Tianmu Branch)

== Southern District ==
=== Jingmei ===
- Edora Park

=== Muzha ===
- Zoo Mall

== See also ==
- List of tourist attractions in Taiwan
