= Ximen Metro Mall =

- 西門地下街
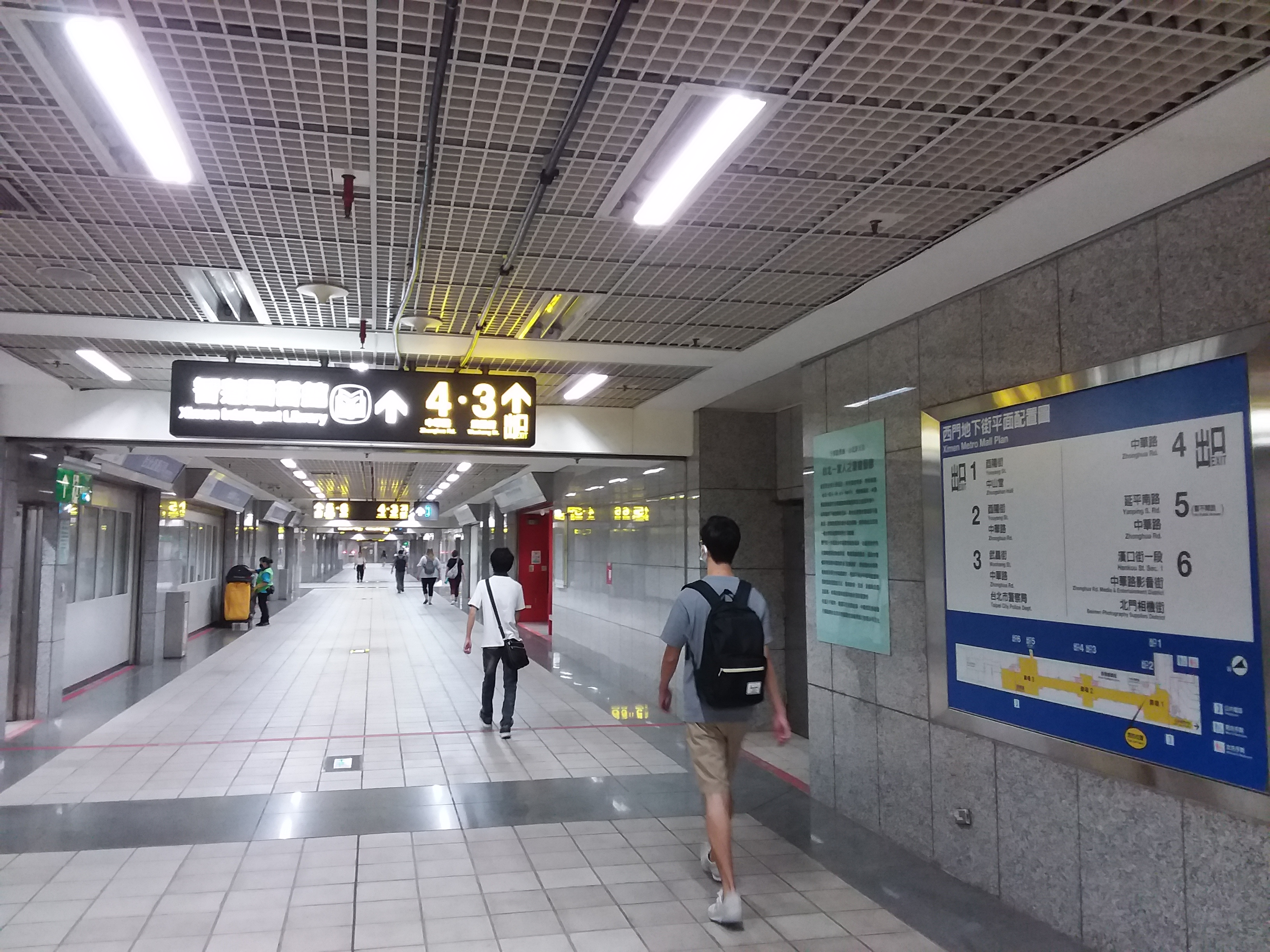
- Location: No. 51-1, Section 1, Zhonghua Road, Wanhua District, Taipei, Taiwan
- Coordinates: 25.045152265419283°N 121.50940264093714°E
- Opened: December 1, 2002
- Floor area: 3,080 m^{2} (33,200 sq ft)
- Public transit: Ximen metro station

Ximen Metro Mall (Chinese: 西門地下街; pinyin: Xīmén Dìxiàjiē) is an underpass located in Wanhua District, Taipei, Taiwan. It is located directly underneath Zhonghua Road and is connected with Ximen metro station.

== History ==
- In 1999, the construction of Ximen Metro Mall was complete.
- Ximen Metro Mall officially started operation on December 1, 2002.

== Structure ==
The total length of the underpass is 182 m (597 ft), with 6 entrances and exits, a total floor area is 3,080 m^{2} (33,200 sq ft) and a maximum capacity of 1520 people.

== Gallery ==
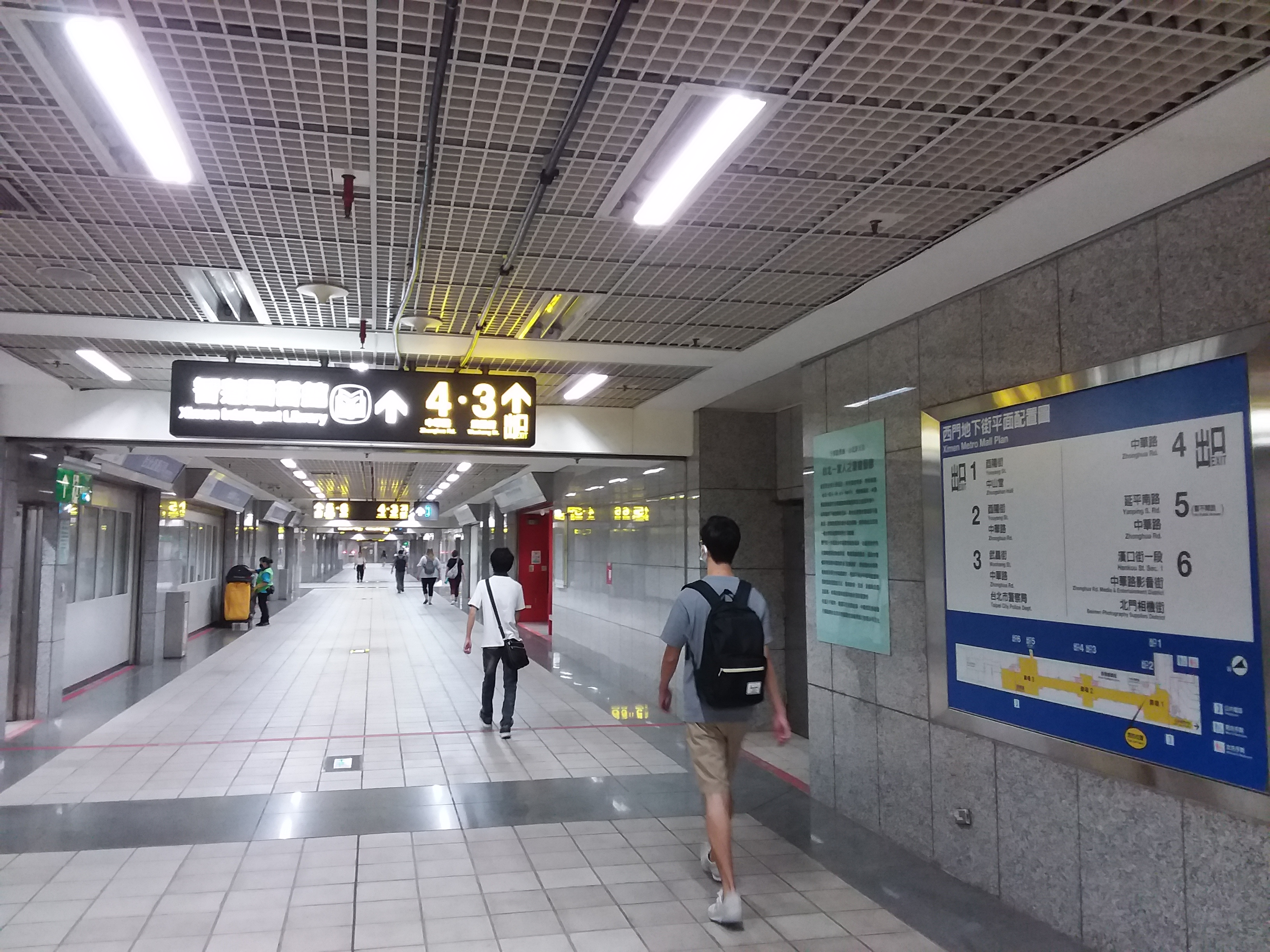
Interior

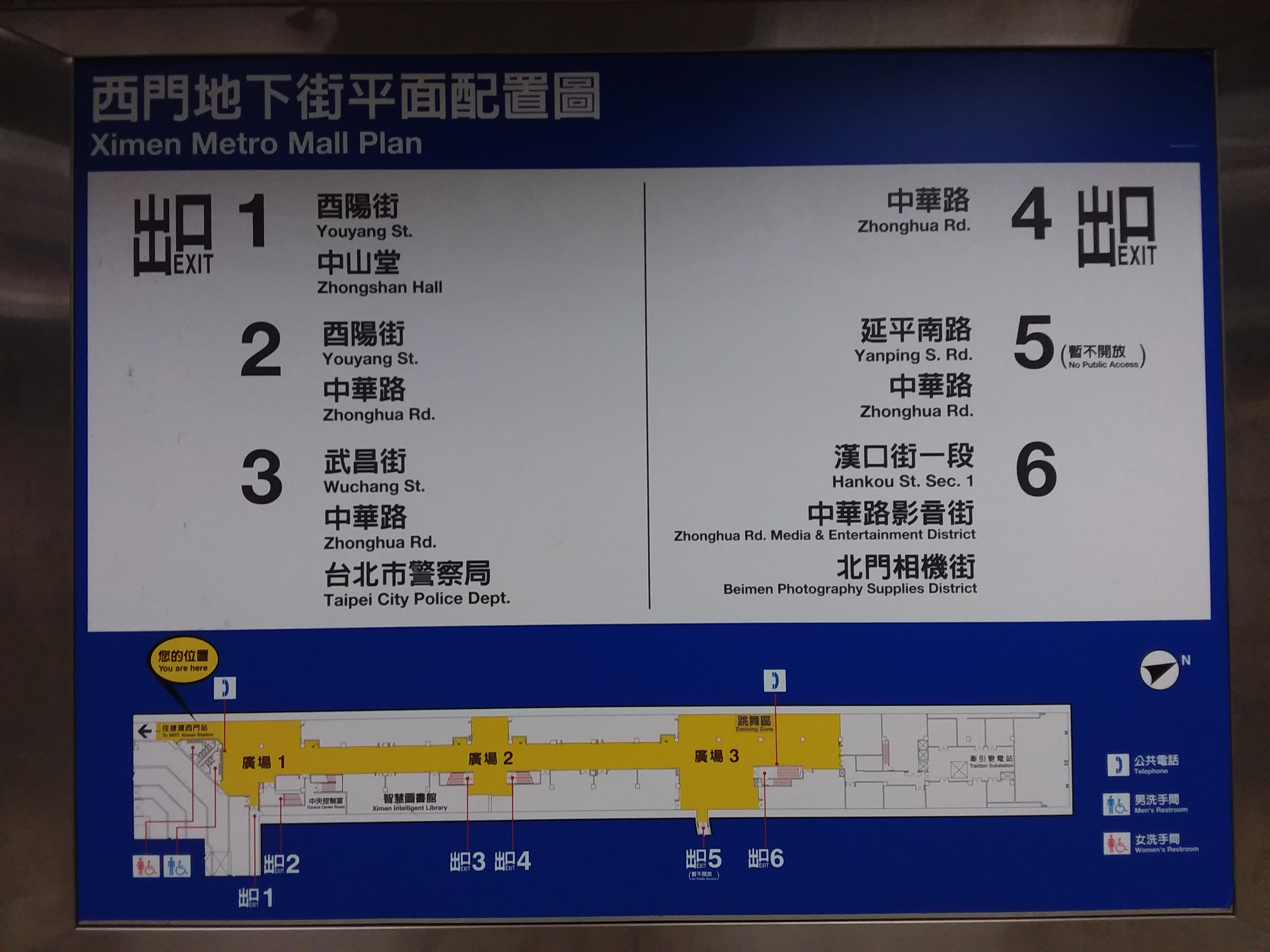

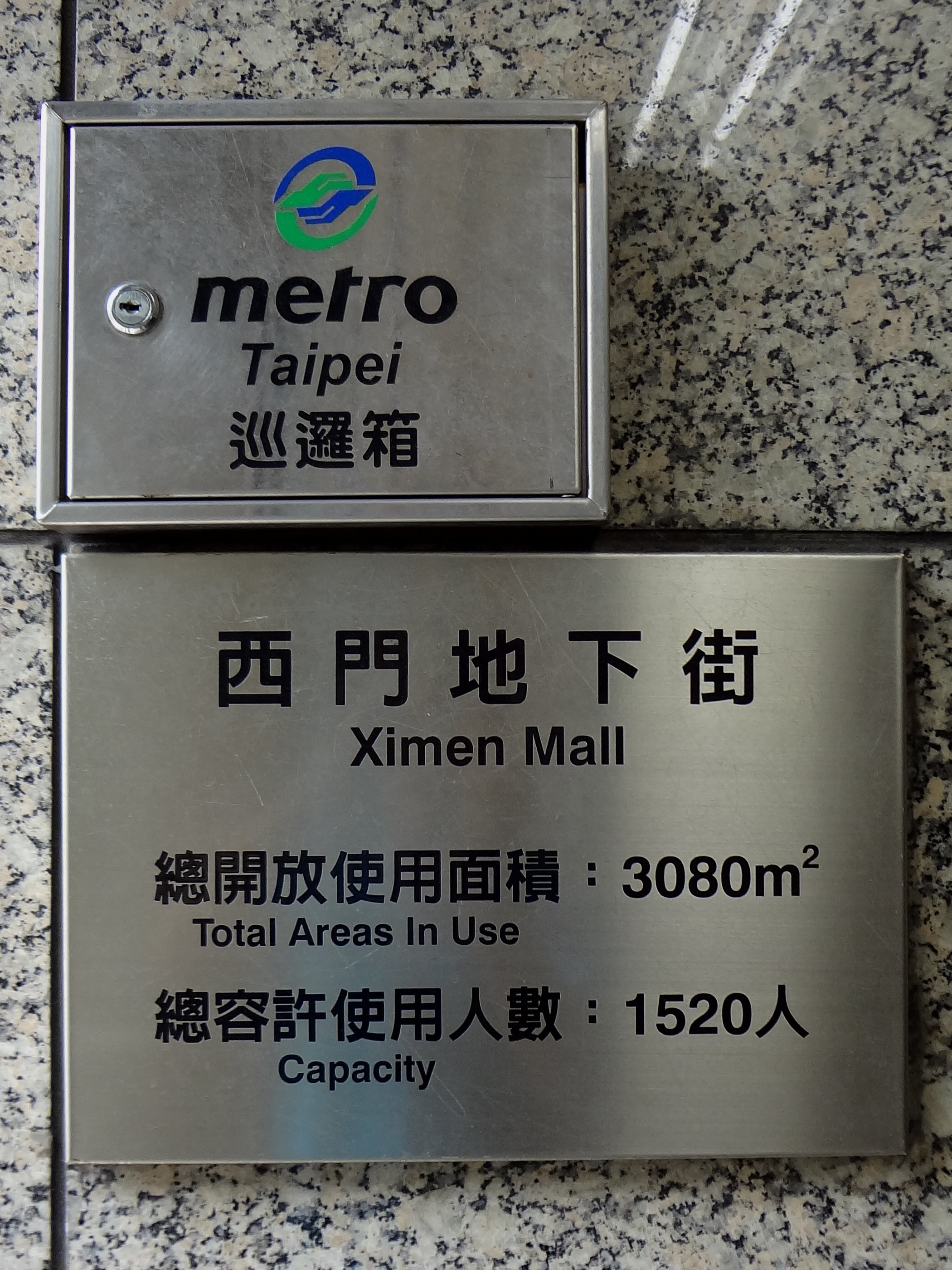

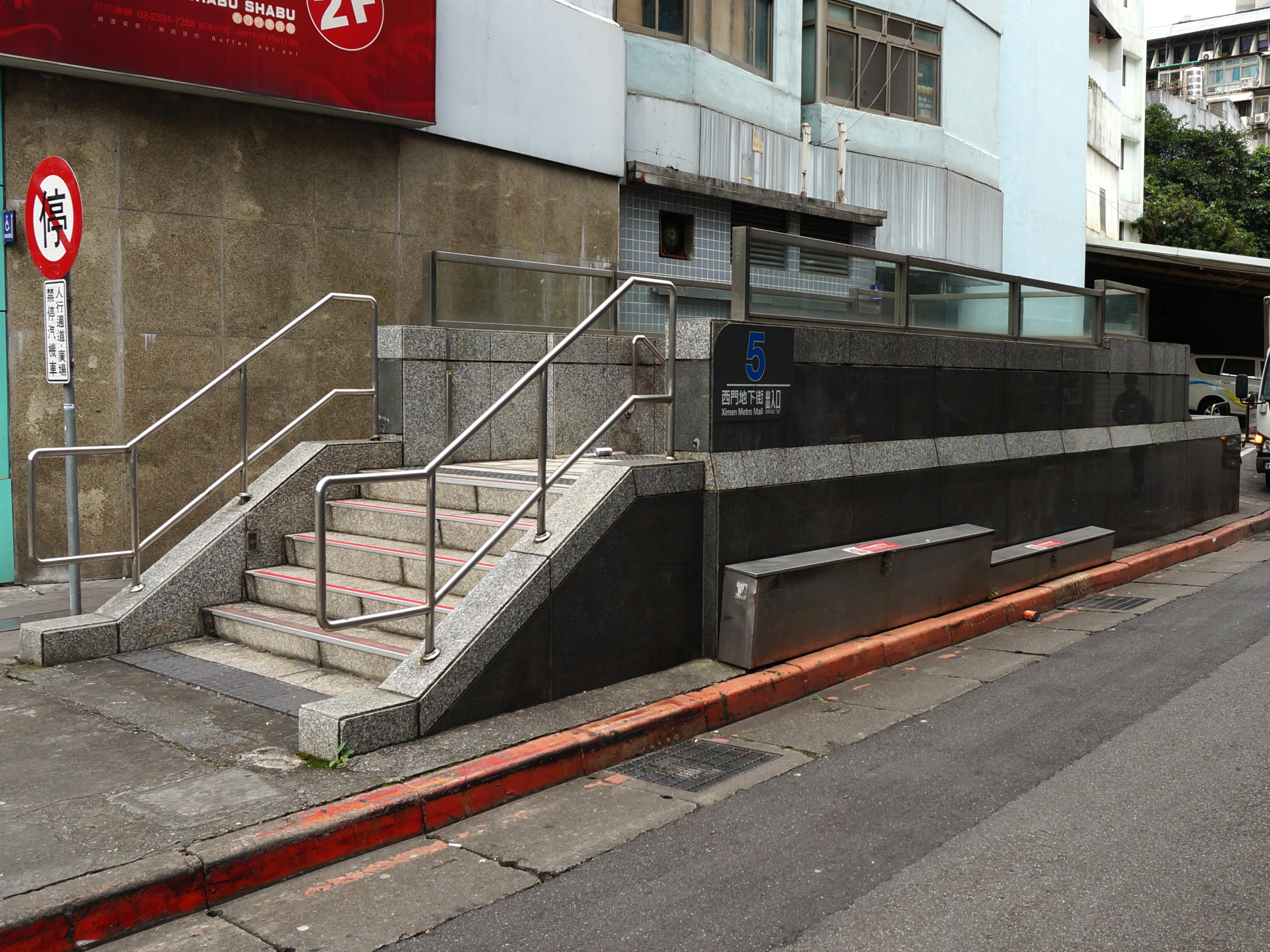
Exit 5

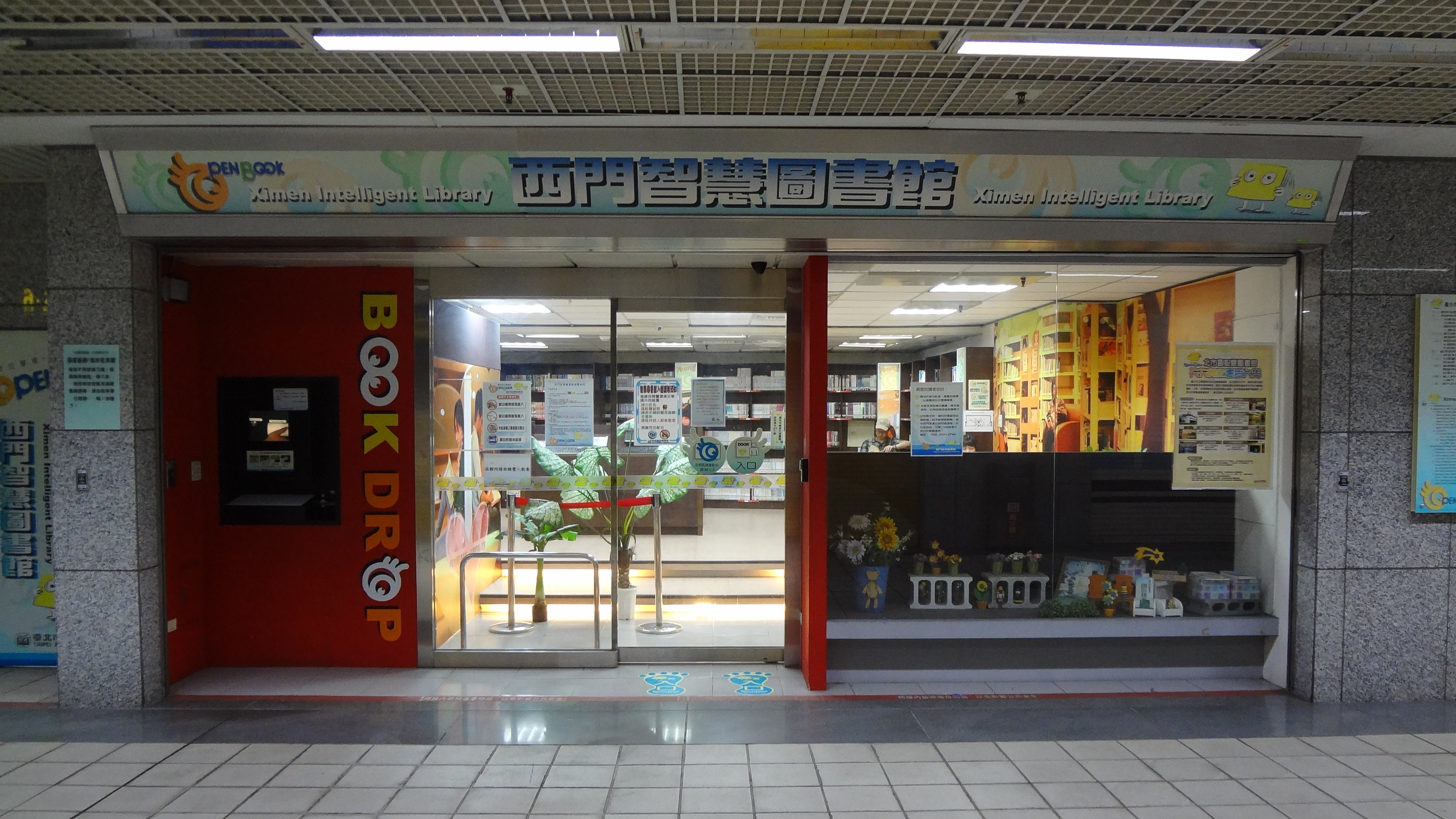
Ximen Intelligent Library

== See also ==
- Zhongshan Metro Mall
- Taipei City Mall
- East Metro Mall
- Station Front Metro Mall
