= Pacific Sogo =

Department store chain

遠東 Sogo
- Type: Retail
- Number of locations: 7 stores

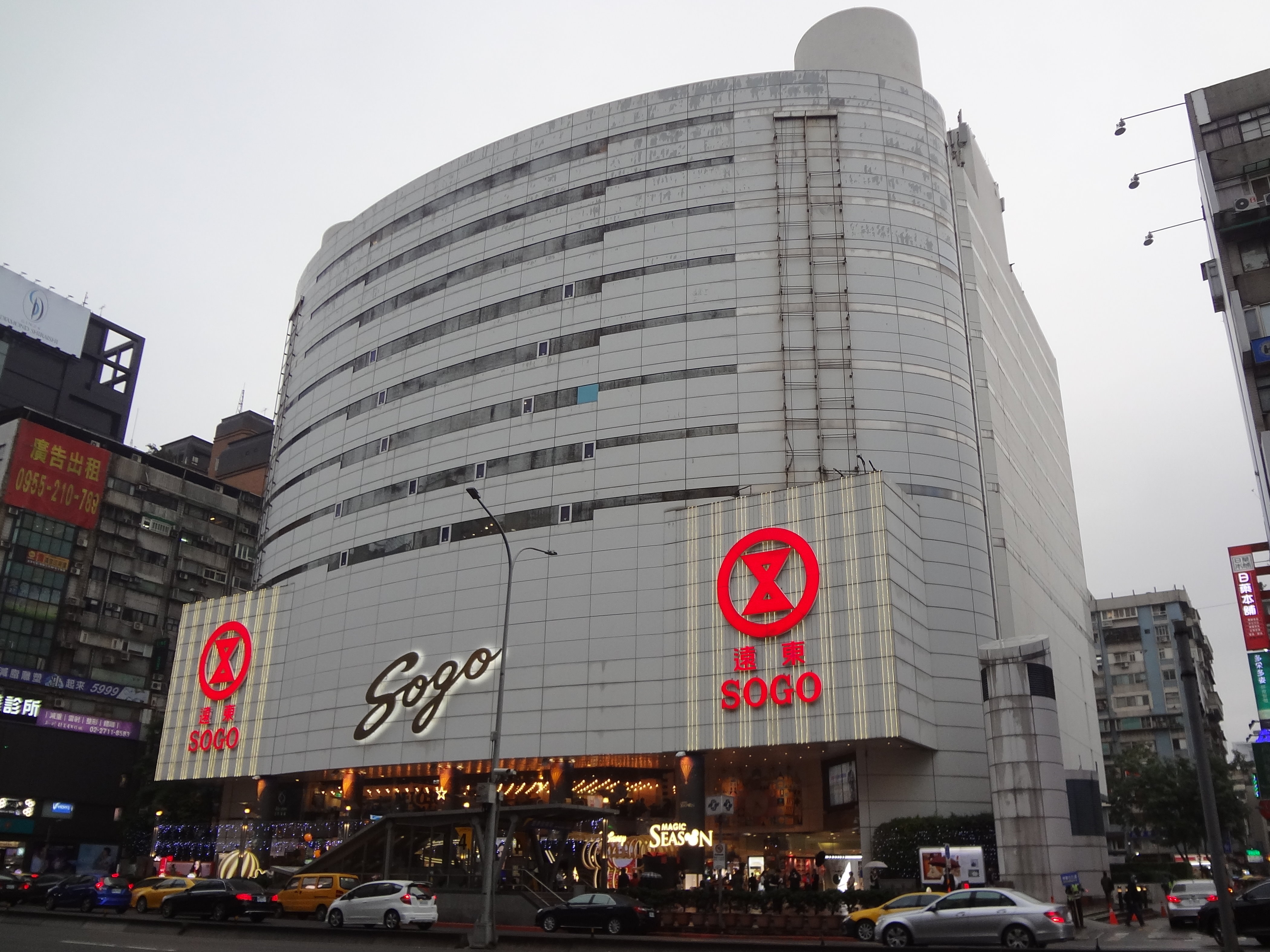
Pacific Sogo Zhongxiao Store

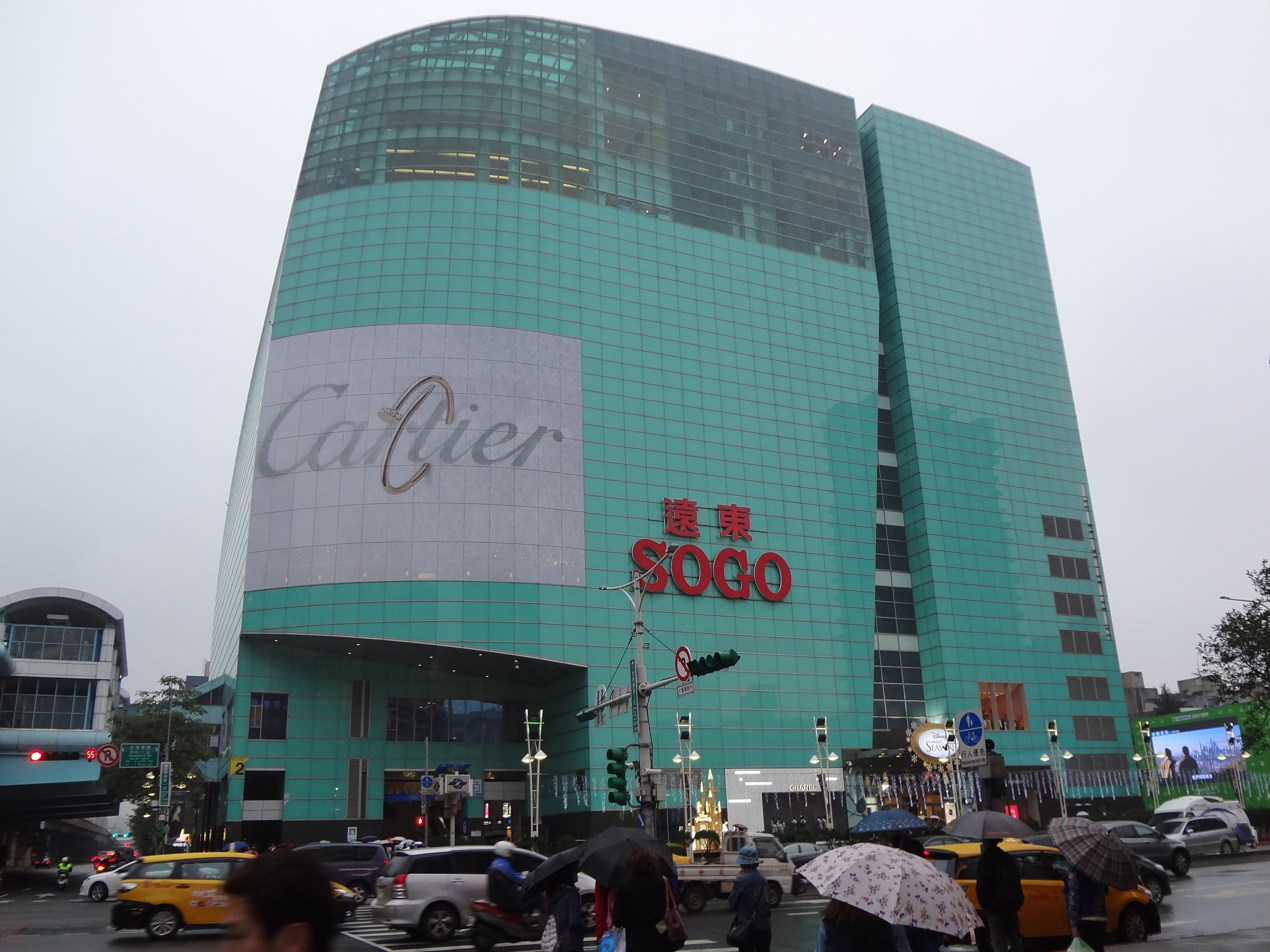
Pacific Sogo Fuxing Store

Pacific Sogo (Chinese: 太平洋崇光百貨) is a department store chain, headquartered in Taipei, Taiwan. It owns seven stores in Taiwan and five stores in China.

Pacific Sogo started its business in 1986 as a joint venture between Taiwan's Pacific Construction and Japan's Sogo, and in 1987 opened its first department store in Taipei. Later, as Pacific Construction went through economic difficulties, its shares were obtained by Far Eastern Group, which also owns the Far Eastern department store chain. The chain later renamed as Far Eastern Sogo (FE Sogo) following ownership change in 2016, while the corporate name is still named Pacific Sogo Department Stores Co., Ltd.

In 2025, Far Eastern Sogo closed its Taipei Dunhua store and will relocate to Garden City in 2026.

Kuang San Sogo, located in Taichung, is not related to Far Eastern Sogo.

== See also ==
- Sogo
- List of shopping malls in Taipei
- List of department stores in Asia
