= Far Eastern Garden City =

- 遠東Garden City
- Location: No. 505, Section 4, Zhongxiao East Road, Xinyi District, Taipei, Taiwan
- Coordinates: 25°2′39″N 121°33′31″E
- Opened: August 22, 2026
- Manager: Far Eastern Group
- Floor area: 119,008 m^{2} (1,280,990 sq ft)
- Floors: 8 floors above ground 2 floors below ground
- Public transit: Sun Yat-sen Memorial Hall metro station
- Website: https://www.gardencity.com.tw/

Far Eastern Garden City (Chinese: 遠東Garden City) is a shopping mall located in Xinyi District of Taipei, Taiwan, that started trial operations on August 22, 2026, and officially opened on September 16, 2026. The mall is a part of a joint development complex along with Taipei Dome, which is owned and operated by the Far Eastern SOGO Department Stores.

The shopping mall is one of the largest malls in Taipei with a total floor area of 36,000 ping (approximately 119,008 m^{2} (1,280,990 sq ft)) and 8 floors above ground and 2 floors below ground. Accommodating more than 500 brands, including 150 restaurant brands, the mall boasts Taiwan's first over 8 m (26 ft) tall perfume fountain.

== Public Transportation ==
The mall is located in close proximity to Sun Yat-sen Memorial Hall metro station, which is served by the Bannan line of Taipei Metro.

== See also ==
- List of shopping malls in Taiwan
- List of shopping malls in Taipei
- List of tourist attractions in Taiwan
- Big City (shopping mall)
- Mega City (shopping mall)
- Top City
