= Citylink (Taiwanese shopping malls) =

Taiwanese shopping mall chain

- Location: Taiwan
- Owner: Ruentex Development Co., Ltd.
- Website: https://www.citylink.tw

Citylink (styled as CITYLINK) is a chain of shopping malls in Taiwan. It has four branches in Taipei, and a fifth branch in New Taipei is under planning. All of the malls are connected to mass transit stations. The malls are owned by Ruentex Development Co. (潤泰新), which opened the first Citylink mall in 2012 as part of the redevelopment of Songshan station.

== Branches ==
=== Songshan store ===
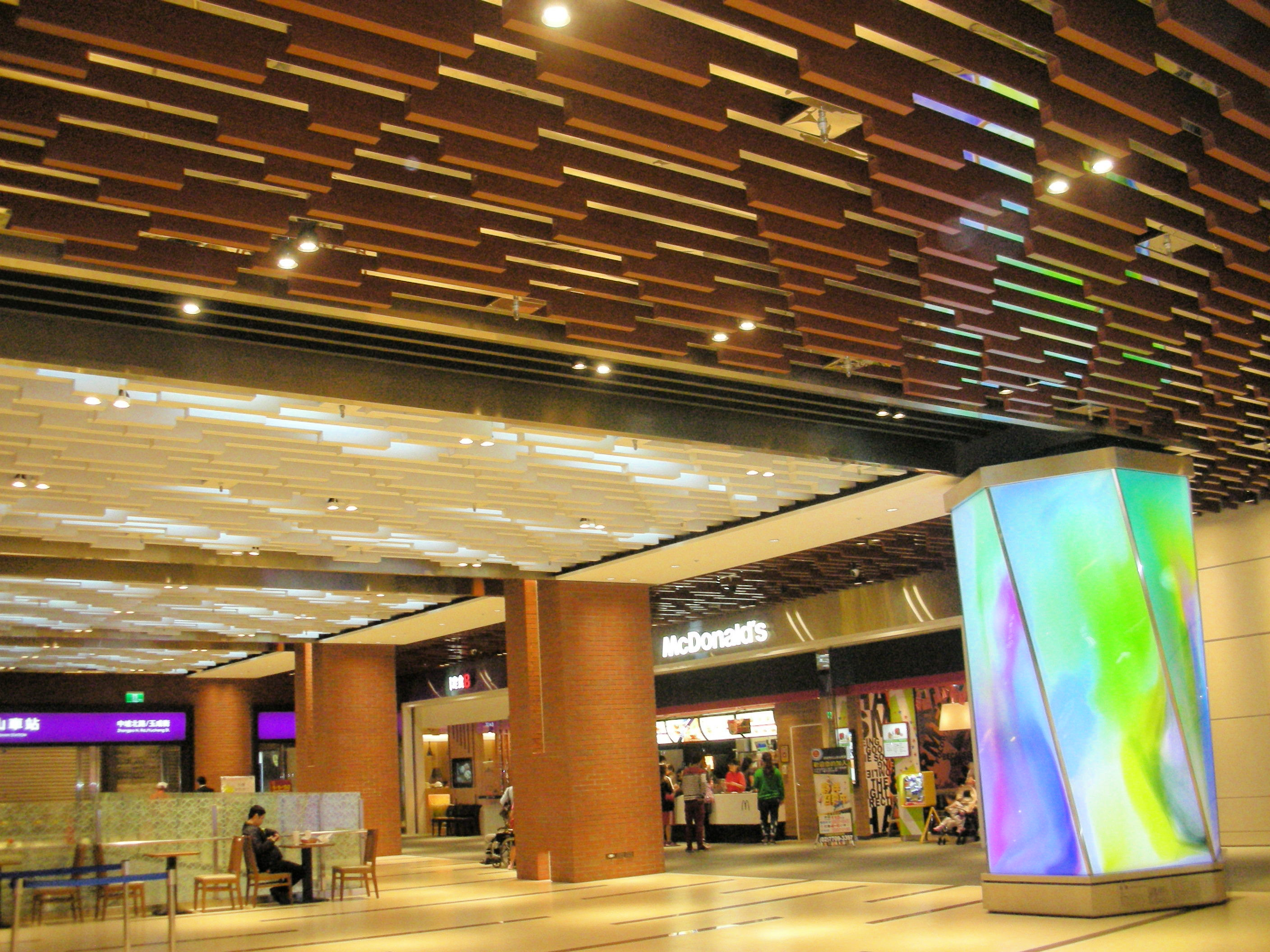
Citylink Songshan

Citylink Songshan (Chinese: CITYLINK 松山店) is a shopping mall in Xinyi District, Taipei, that opened on 18 December 2012. The mall occupies levels 1 to 3 of Songshan station. The main core stores of the mall include Muji, Uniqlo, Hsin Tung Yang and various themed restaurants.

=== Nangang store ===
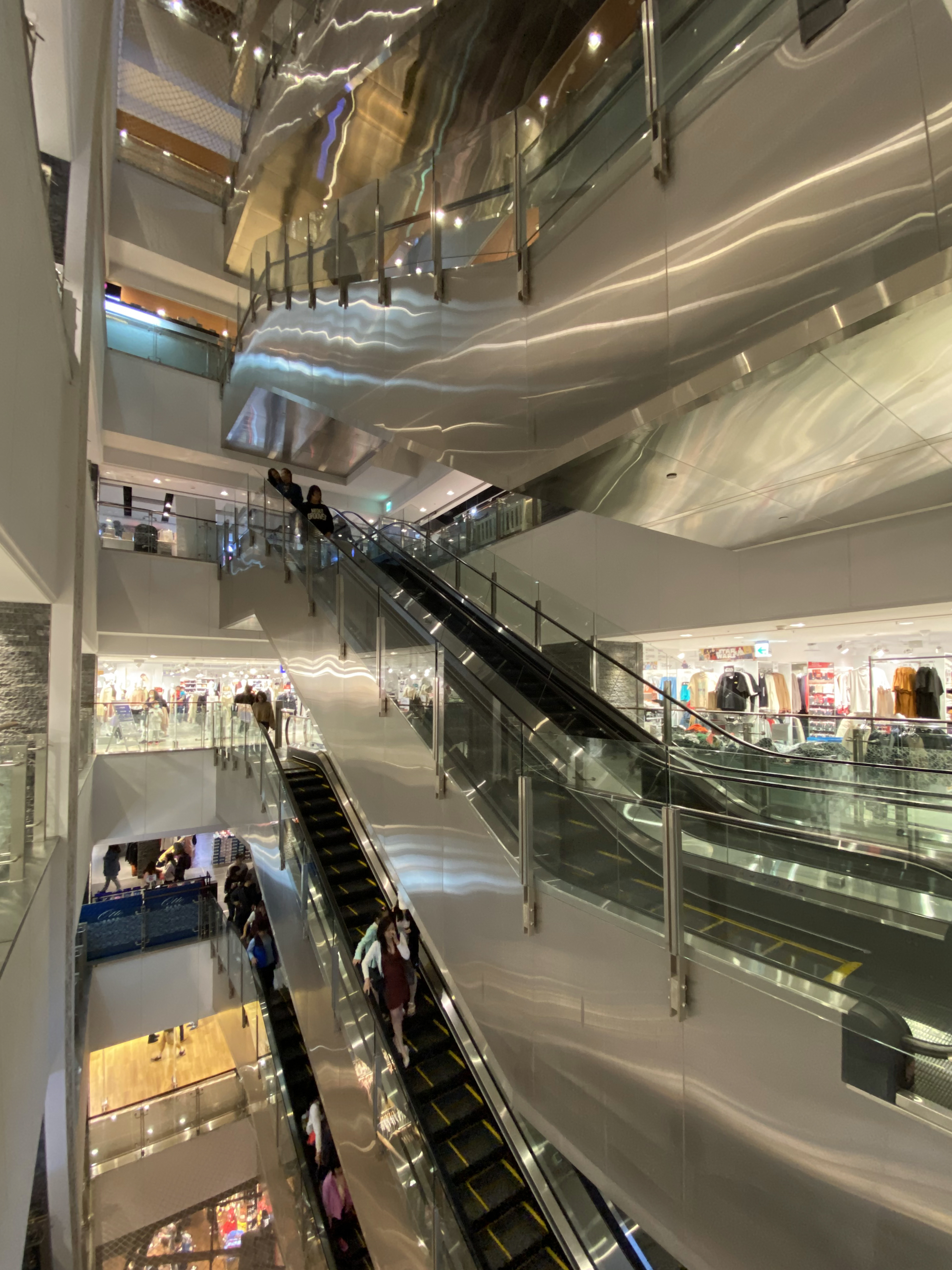
Escalator void of Citylink Nangang, 2020

Citylink Nangang (Chinese: CITYLINK南港店) is a shopping mall in Nangang District, Taipei, that opened on 19 December 2014. The mall occupies levels 1 to 10 of Block C of the Ruentex Nangang Station Complex. Main core stores of the mall include Tsutaya Bookstore, Uniqlo, Century Asia Cinemas, and various themed restaurants.

=== Neihu store ===
Citylink Neihu (Chinese: CITYLINK內湖店) is a shopping mall in Neihu District, Taipei, that opened on 29 March 2018. The mall occupies levels 1 and 2 of the Neihu metro station complex. Main core stores of the mall include Tsutaya Bookstore, Uniqlo, and various themed restaurants.

=== Sanchong store ===
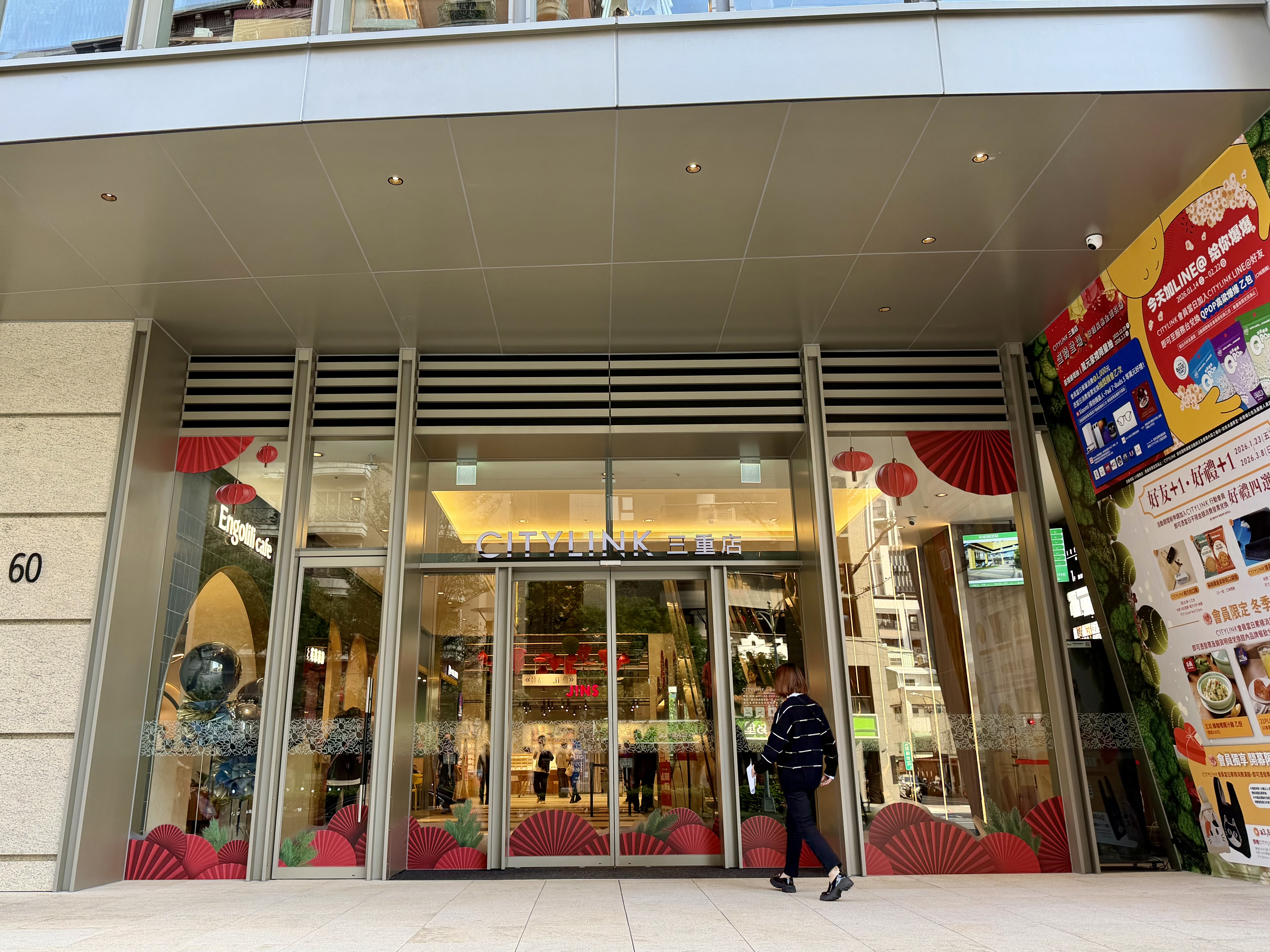
CITYLINK Sanchong Store 2026.

Citylink Sanchong (Chinese: CITYLINK 三重店) is connected to Sanchong metro station in New Taipei and the mall occupies levels 1 and 2 of the Ruentex City Park complex. The mall opened on 20 December 2025, and its main core stores include Sushiro, Introstem, Starbucks, 2nd Street, Milksha, Ichibanya, Matsumoto Kiyoshi, Xiaomi, etc. It is the first shopping mall in Sanchong District, with a retail area totalling approximately 6,600 m^{2} (71,000 sq ft).
