= Milksha =

Taiwanese bubble tea shop chain

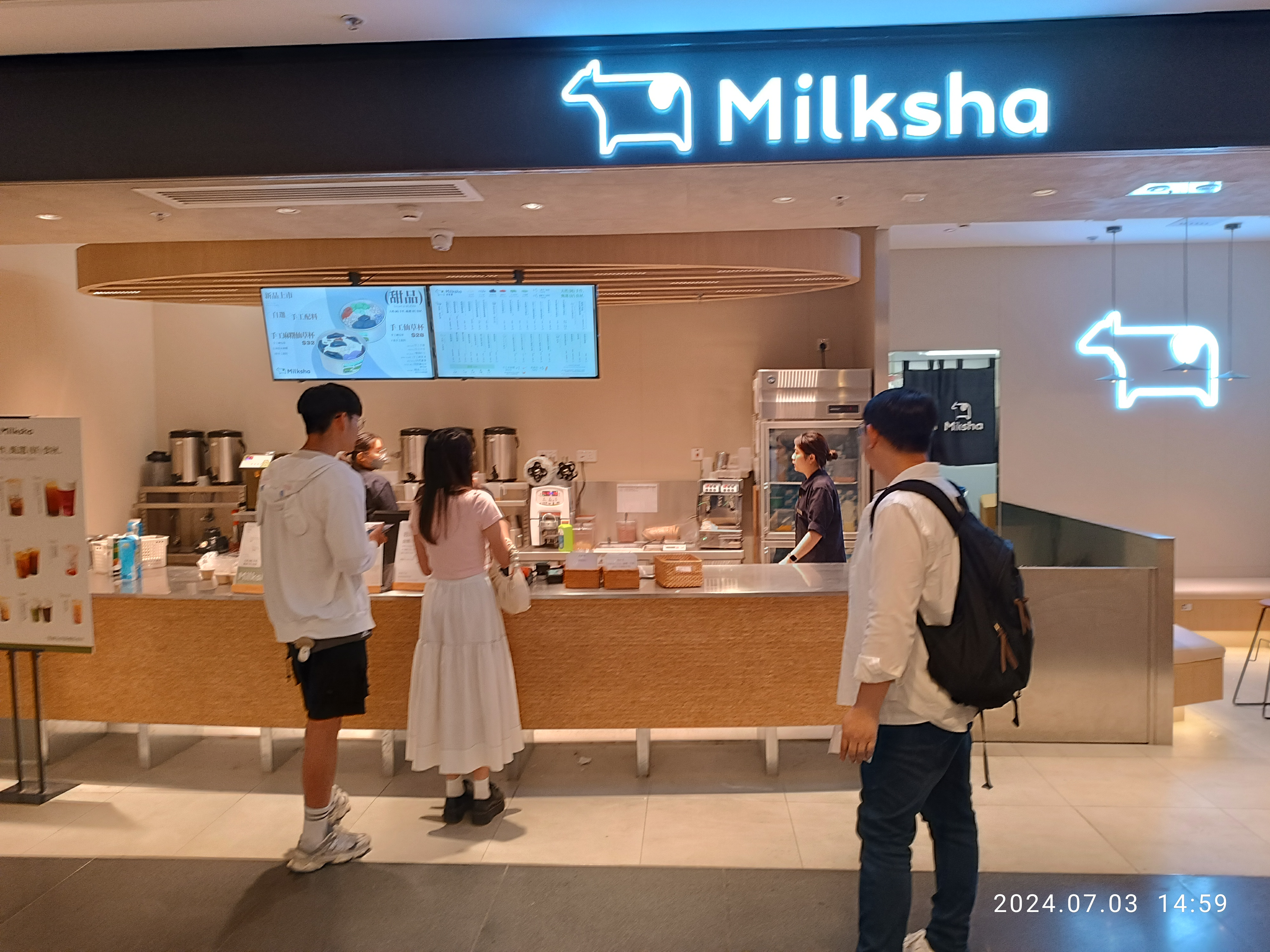
- Shop in Hong Kong
- Native name: 迷客夏
- Industry: Bubble tea
- Founded: 2007

Milksha (Chinese: 迷客夏) is a Taiwan-based chain of bubble tea shops. The business was established in 2007 in Jiali District, Tainan, Taiwan.
