= Taipei City Mall =

Shopping mall in Taipei, Taiwan

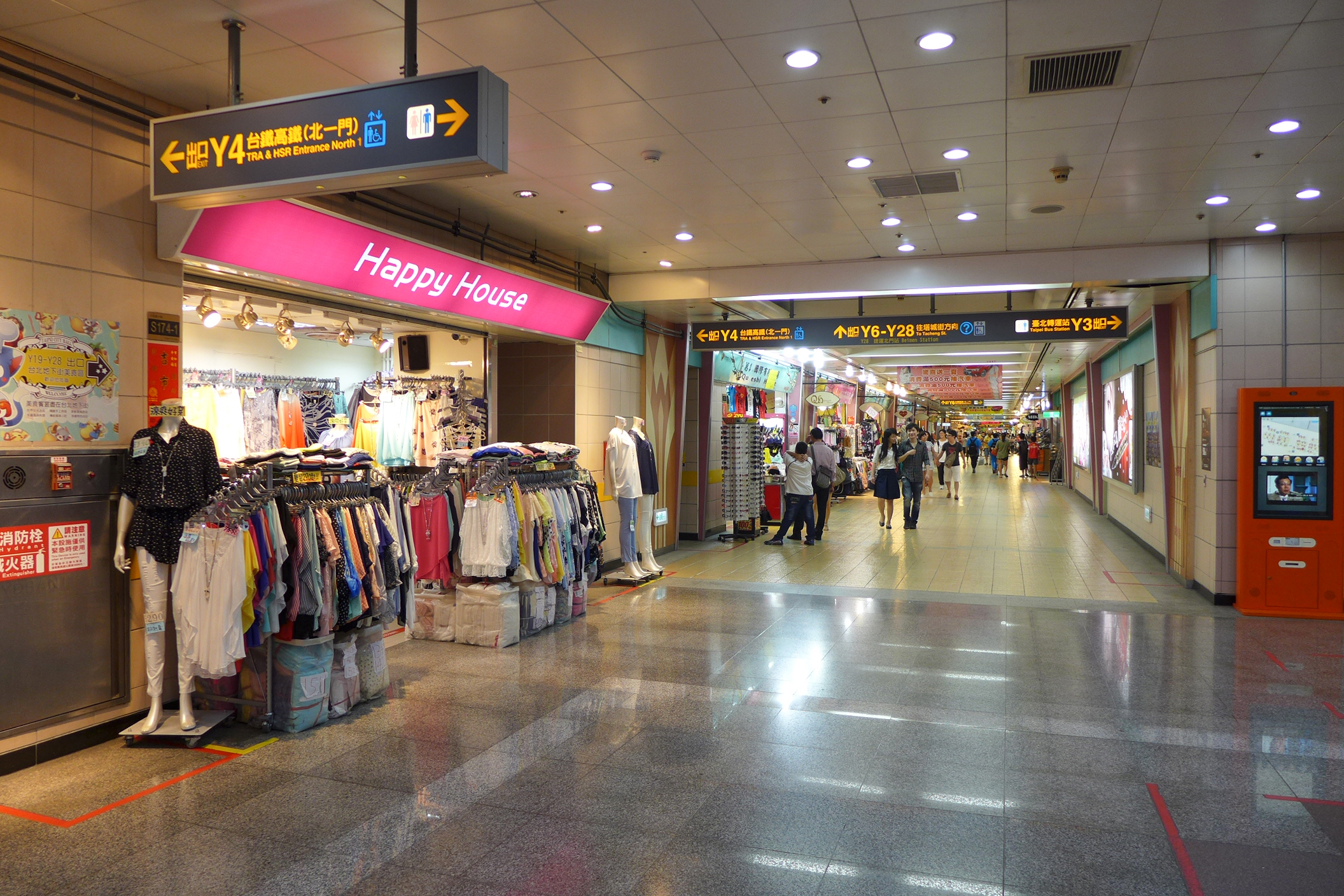
Taipei City Mall

Taipei City Mall (Chinese: 台北地下街; pinyin: Táiběi Dìxiàjiē) is a shopping center located at the intersection of the Datong and Zhongzheng districts in Taipei, Taiwan. It is the first underground market in Taipei City. It is located under Civic Boulevard (市民大道 Shìmín Dàdào), Section 1.

== Structure ==
It is about 825 meters long, and has 28 exits/entrances, 14 each on the north and south sides. It is connected with Taipei Main Station for Taipei Metro, Taiwan Railway, Taiwan High Speed Rail, and the Taoyuan Airport MRT, and the Shin Kong Life Tower. At the west end of the market is Beimen Station. There are a total of 187 shops in the market.

The first floor underground consists of shops, while the second floor underground is a parking lot. The mall is divided up into 3 main sections: clothing, electronics, and food.

== History ==
- October 1992: Taipei City Government decided to demolish the Chunghwa Market (中華商場 Zhōnghuá Shāngchǎng).
- 29 March 2000: Taipei City Mall was opened with shops made available for 810 of the original tenants of the demolished market.
- 15 March 2004: The Station Front Metro Mall was re-opened, allowing the rest of the 254 tenants of the original Chunghwa Market to open for business there.

== See also ==
- ACG
- Zhongshan Metro Mall
- East Metro Mall
- Station Front Metro Mall
- List of shopping malls in Taipei
