= East Metro Mall =

Shopping mall in Da'an, Taipei, Taiwan

- 東區地下街
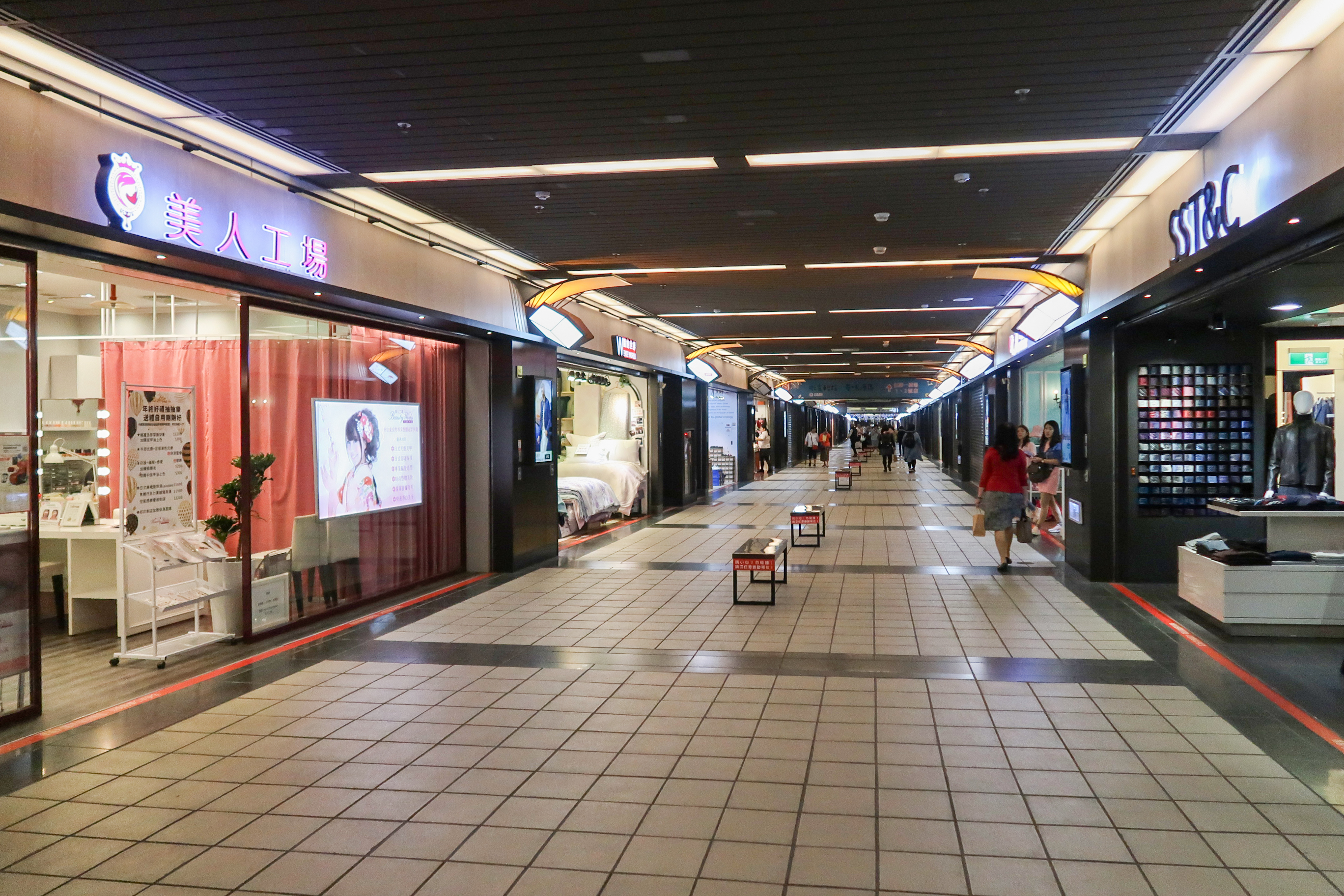
- Location: Da'an District, Taipei, Taiwan
- Coordinates: 25.041773251496824°N 121.54924843989555°E
- Opened: July 19th, 2002
- Floor area: 10,446 m^{2} (112,440 sq ft)
- Public transit: Zhongxiao Dunhua metro station, Zhongxiao Fuxing metro station

East Metro Mall (Chinese: 東區地下街; pinyin: Dōngqū Dìxiàjiē) is a shopping center located in Da'an District, Taipei, Taiwan. It is the first underground mall in the Eastern District of Taipei, connecting Zhongxiao Dunhua metro station and Zhongxiao Fuxing metro station.

== History ==
- East Metro Mall officially started operation on July 19, 2002.

== Structure ==
The East Metro Mall is located under Zhongxiao East Road, starting from the east of Zhongxiao Fuxing metro station in the west, and reaching the east of Zhongxiao Dunhua metro station in the east. The floor area on the west of the mall is equal to the subterranean floor of Zhongxiao Fuxing metro station, and the floor area on the east is slightly higher than the underground of Zhongxiao Dunhua metro station. The total length is 725 m (2,379 ft), the floor area is 10,446 m^{2} (112,440 sq ft), and the maximum capacity of occupants is 4,047. There are 17 entrances and exits in the underground mall, among which exits 1-8 are the entrances and exits of Zhongxiao Dunhua metro station; the west side is connected with Zhongxiao Fuxing metro station by a long corridor.

== Gallery ==
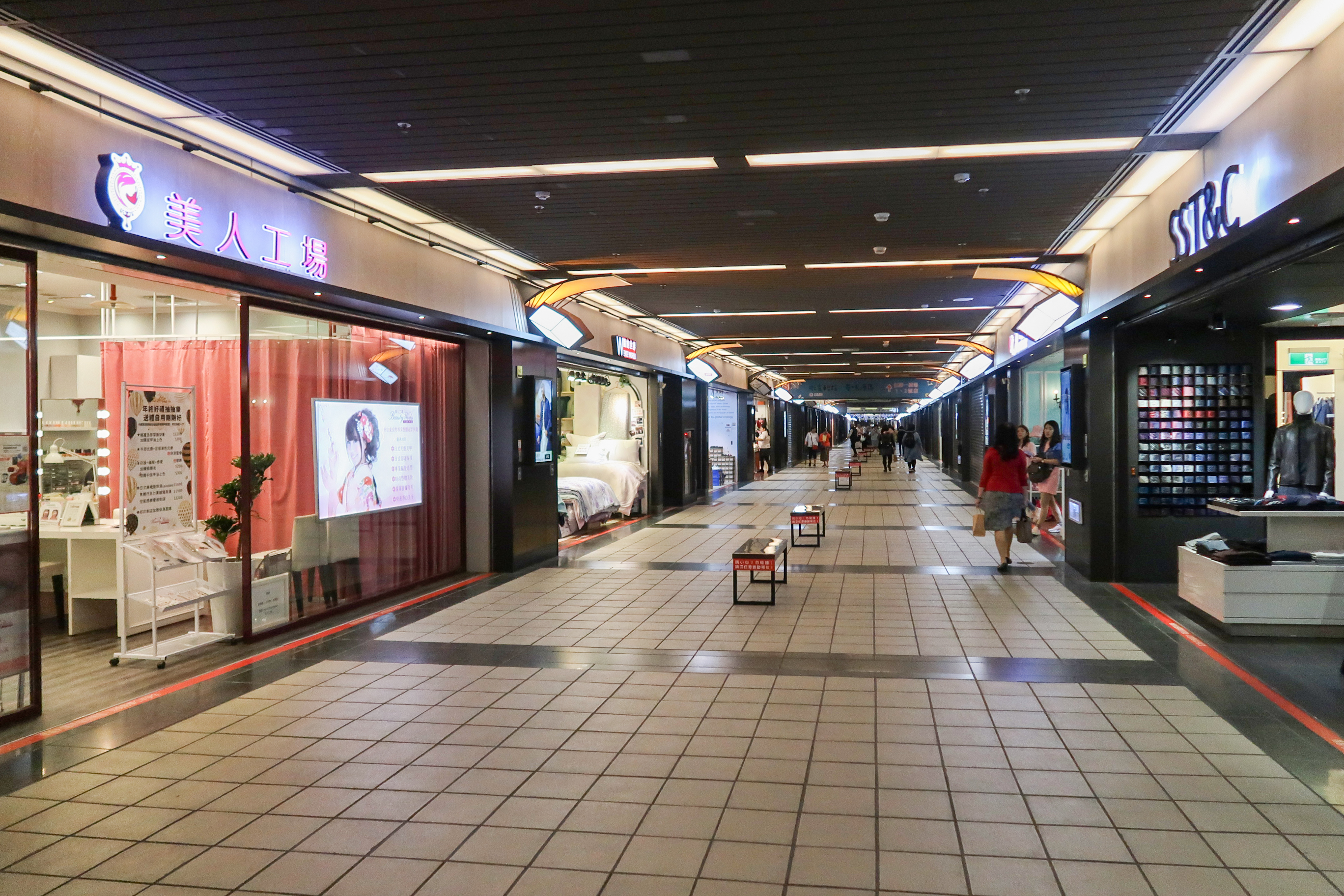
Interior

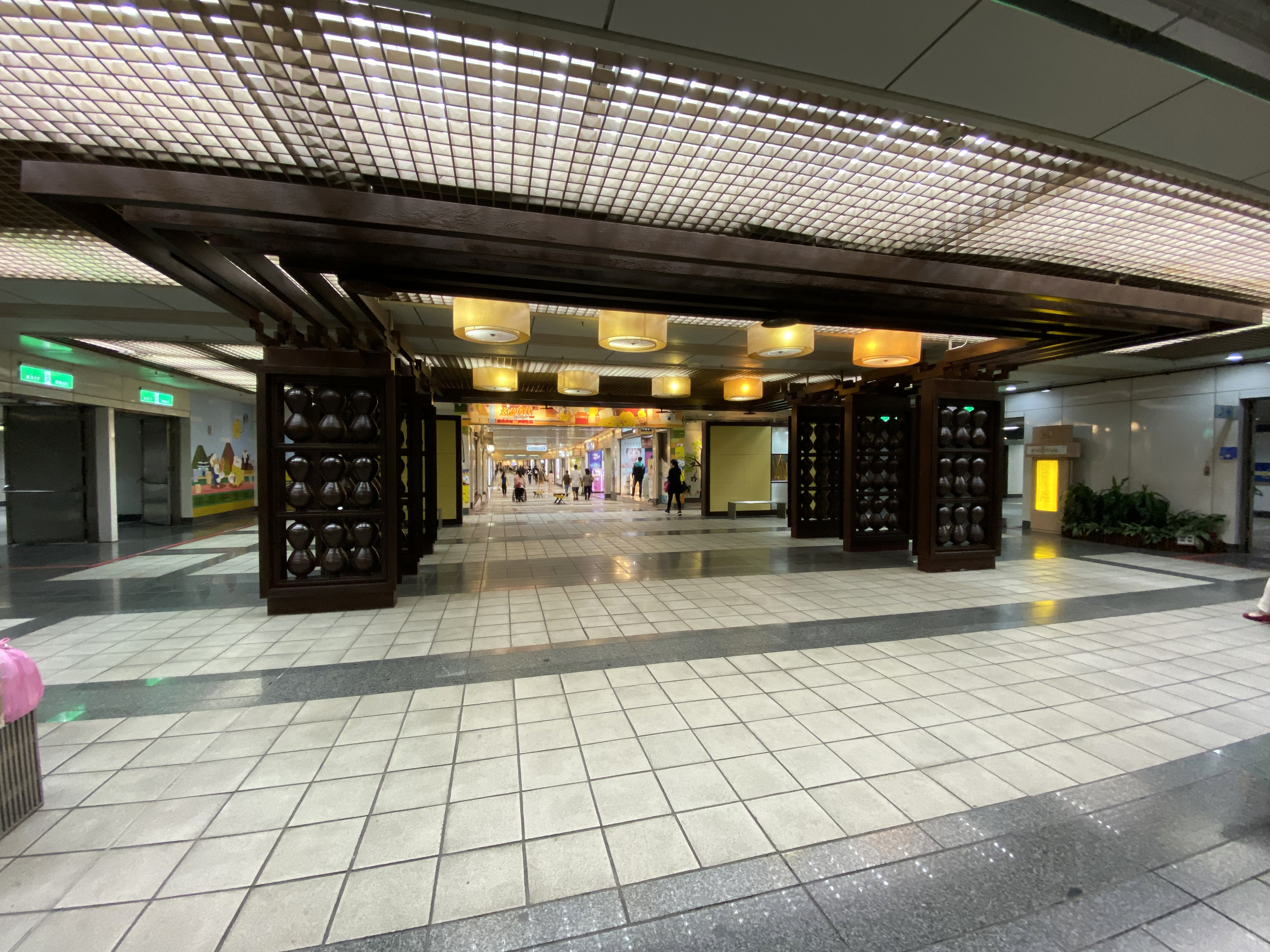
Plaza 5

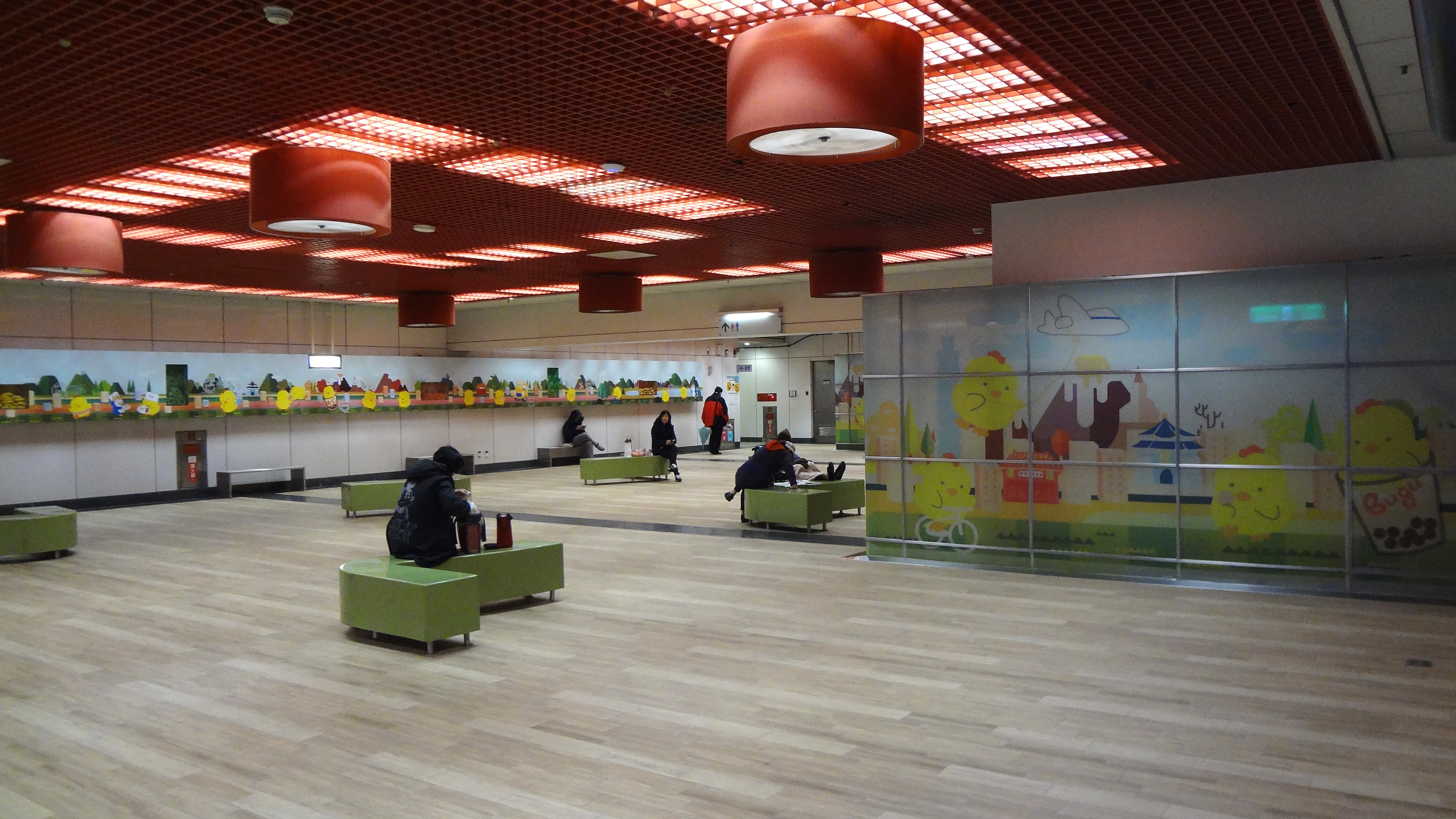
Plaza 7

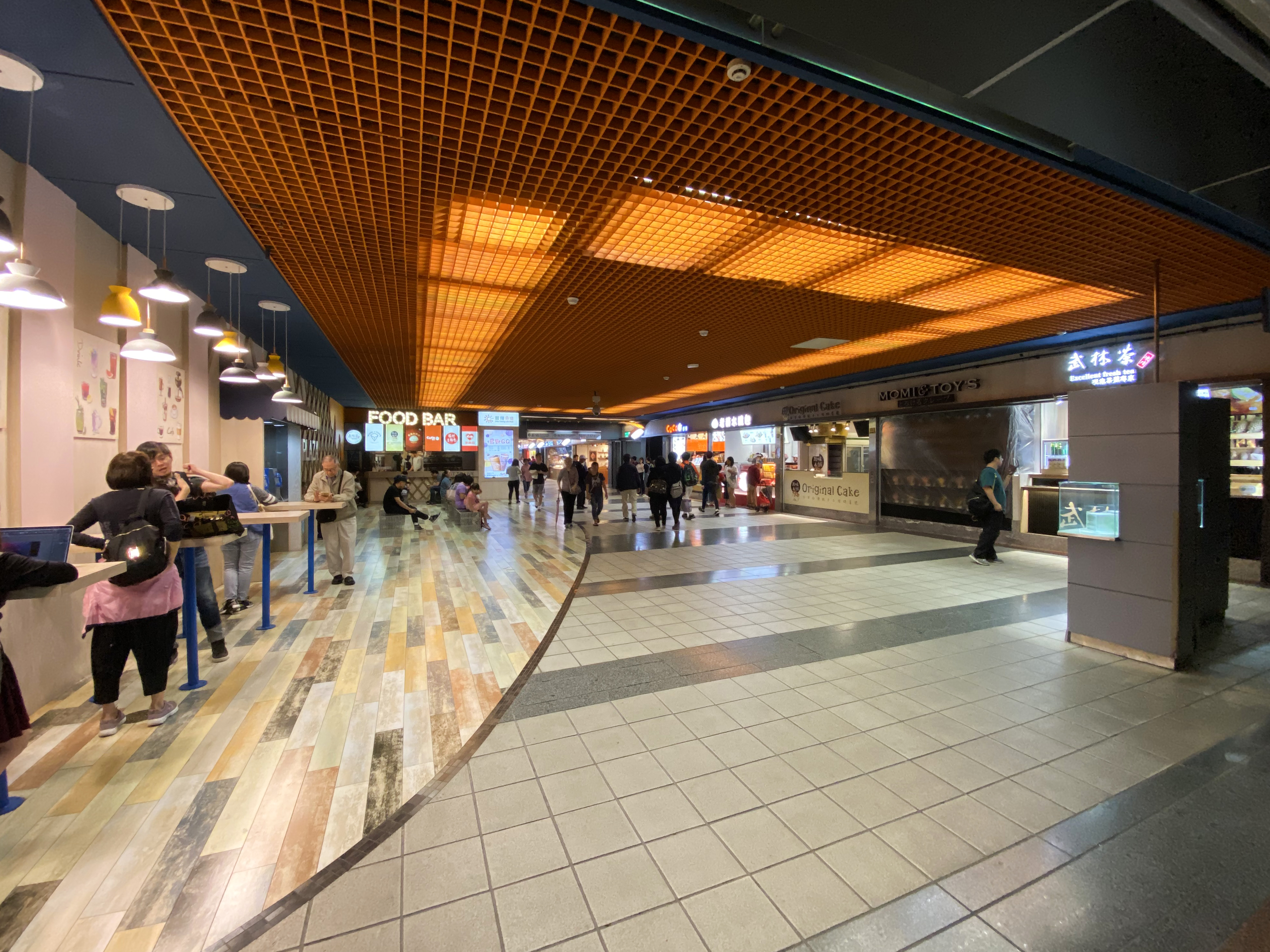
Food Hall

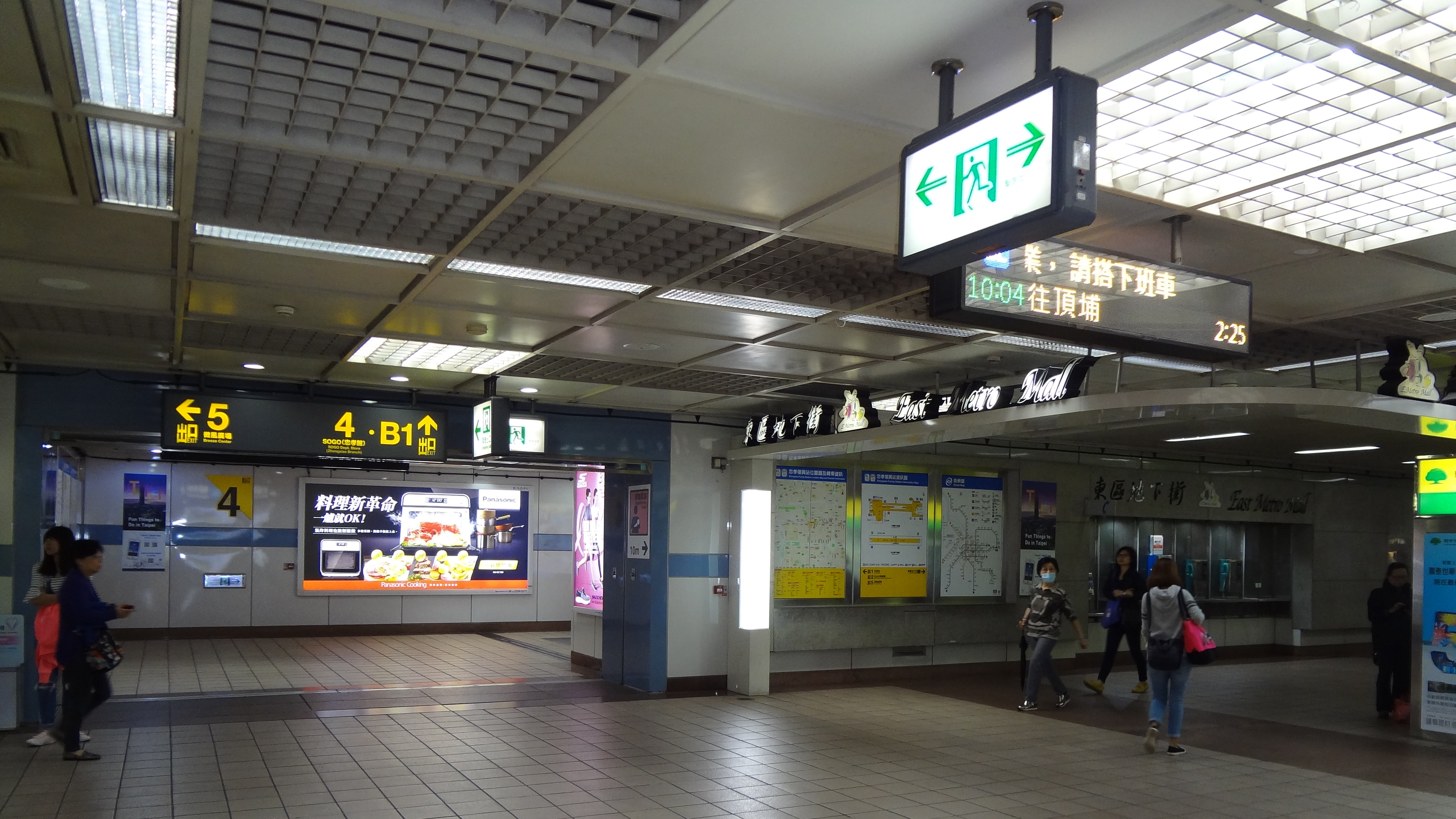
Entrance from Zhongxiao Fuxing metro station

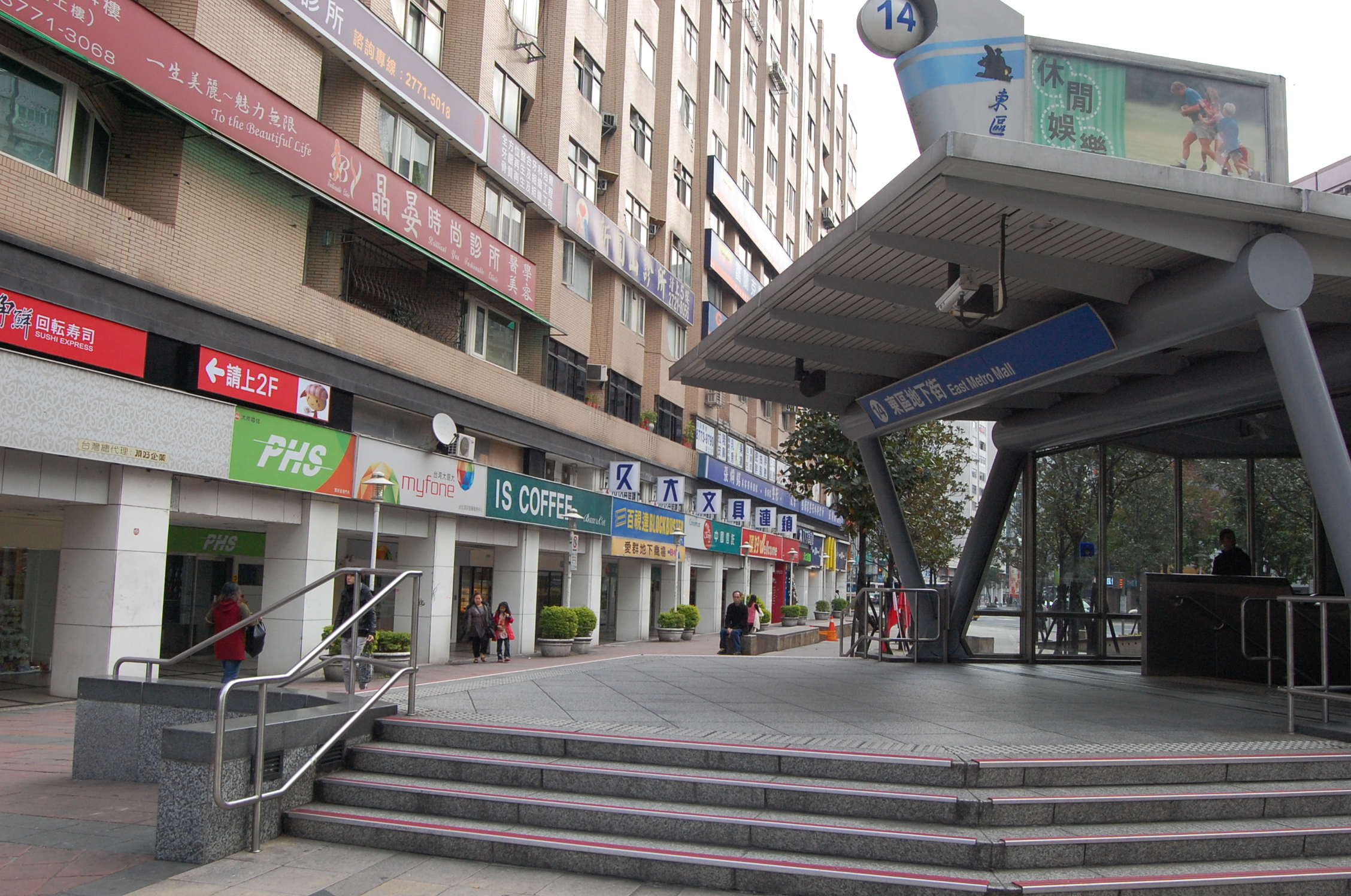
Exit 14

== See also ==
- Zhongshan Metro Mall
- Taipei City Mall
- Station Front Metro Mall
- List of shopping malls in Taipei
