= Station Front Metro Mall =

Shopping mall in Zhongzheng, Taipei, Taiwan

- 站前地下街
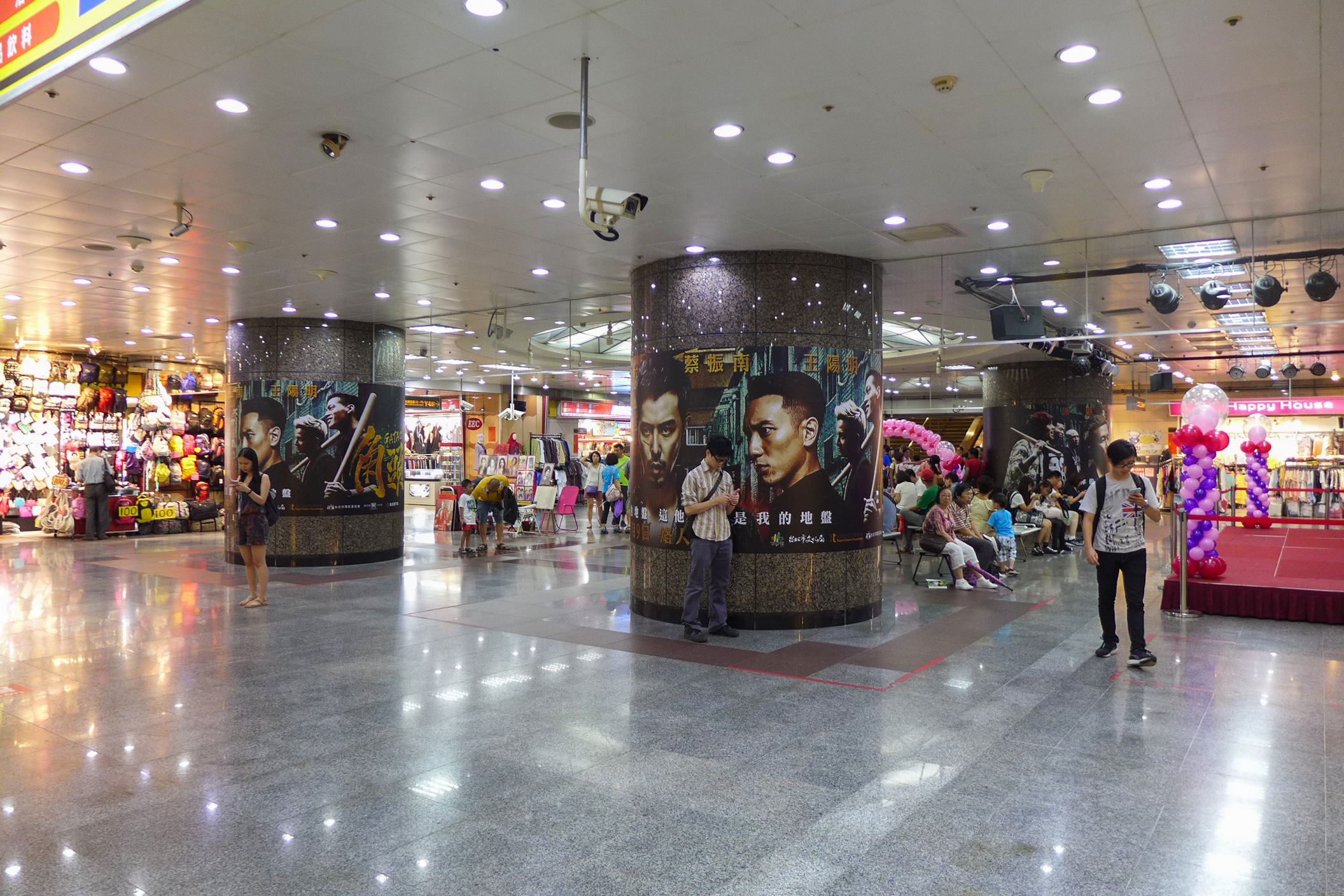
- Location: No. 50-1, Section 1, Zhongxiao West Road, Zhongzheng District, Taipei, Taiwan
- Coordinates: 25.047422561659523°N 121.51487445442925°E
- Opened: March 15, 2004
- Floor area: 9,220 m^{2} (99,200 sq ft)
- Public transit: Taipei Main Station
- Website: http://www.sfmm.org.tw/

Station Front Metro Mall (Chinese: 站前地下街; pinyin: Zhànqián Dìxiàjiē) is an underground shopping center located in Zhongzheng District, Taipei, Taiwan. It is located directly underneath Zhongxiao West Road and is connected with Taipei Main Station.

== History ==
- October 1992: Taipei City Government decided to demolish the Chunghwa Market (中華商場 Zhōnghuá Shāngchǎng).
- Station Front Metro Mall officially started operation on March 15, 2004, allowing 254 tenants of the original Chunghwa Market to open for business there.

== Structure ==
The total length of the underground mall is 343 m (1,125 ft), with 10 entrances and exits, 6 comprehensive squares, 3 elevators, 2 toilets on the east and west sides (to the MRT and exit Z7), and 1 unmanned bank (Ruixing Bank). The total floor area is 9,220 m^{2} (99,200 sq ft) with a maximum capacity of 4370 people.

- Zhongxiao W. Rd S Exit：

Exit	Info
Z2	Shin Kong Mitsukoshi, Nanyang St., Caesar Park Hotel Taipei
Z4	Guanqian Rd., Shin Kong Mitsukoshi, National Taiwan Museum
Z6	Guanqian Rd., National Taiwan Museum
Z8	Huaining St., Taipei Square Building
Z10	Taipei Post Office, Chongqing S Rd., Futai St. Yanglo, Cheng-En Gate / Beimen

- Zhongxiao W. Rd N Exit：

Exit	Info
Z1	ChengDe Rd., Taoyuan Airport MRT, Taipei Main Station / TRA HSR
Z3	Guanqian Rd.
Z5	Chongqing N Rd.
Z7	Chongqing N Rd., Taoyuan Airport MRT
Z9	Chongqing N Rd., Taoyuan Airport MRT, Taiwan Governor General's Bureau of Transportation

== Gallery ==
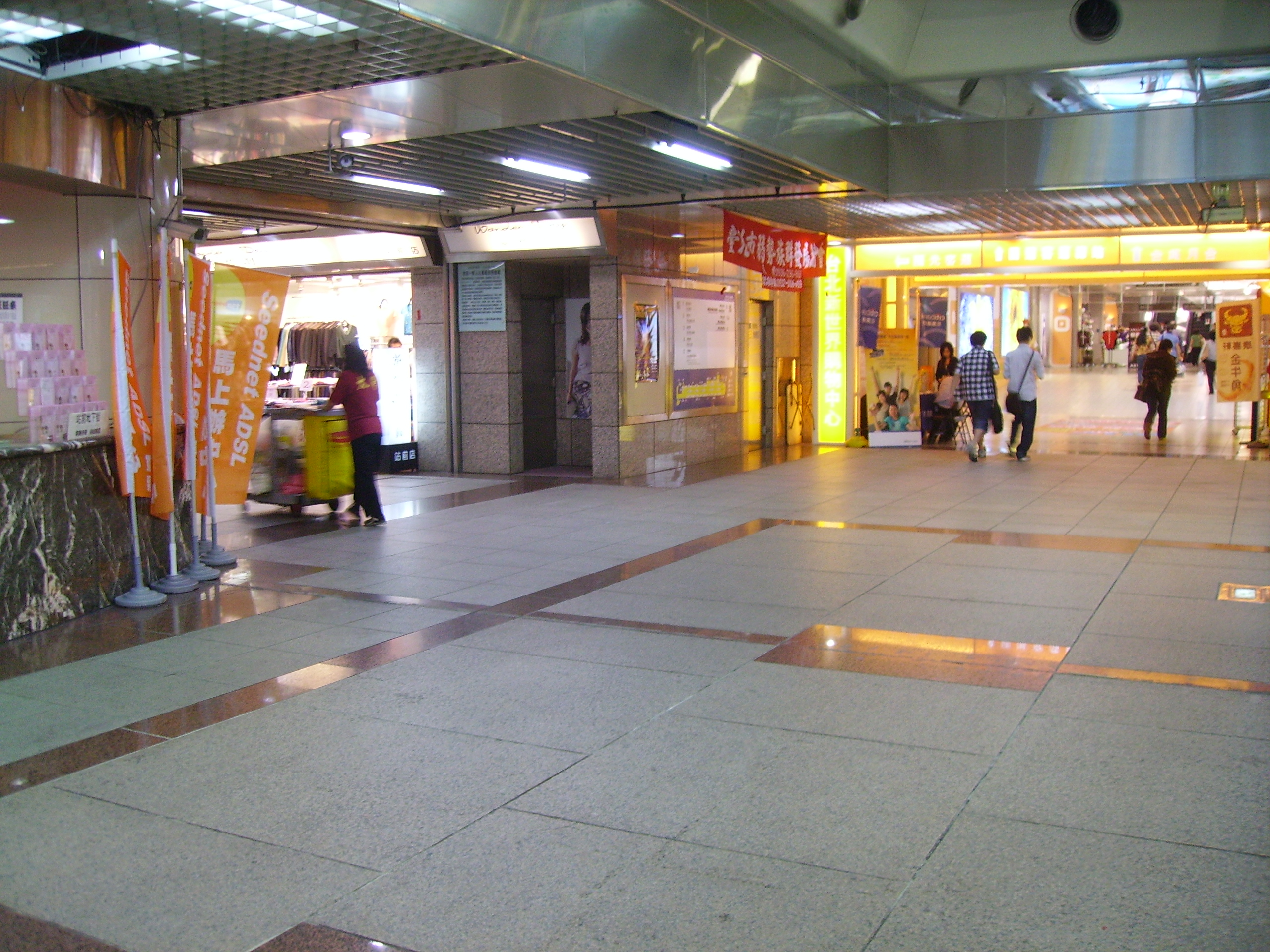
Interior

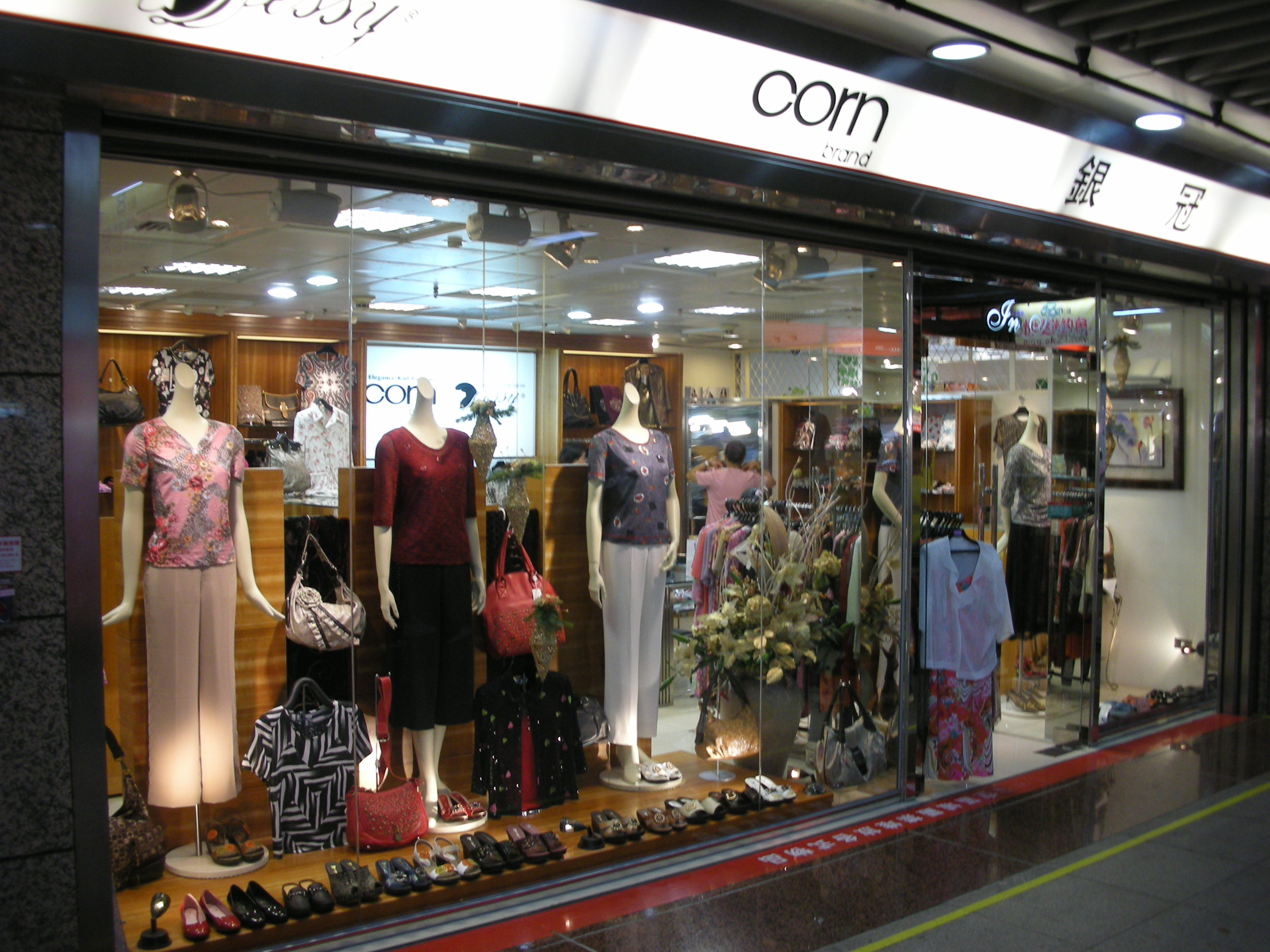

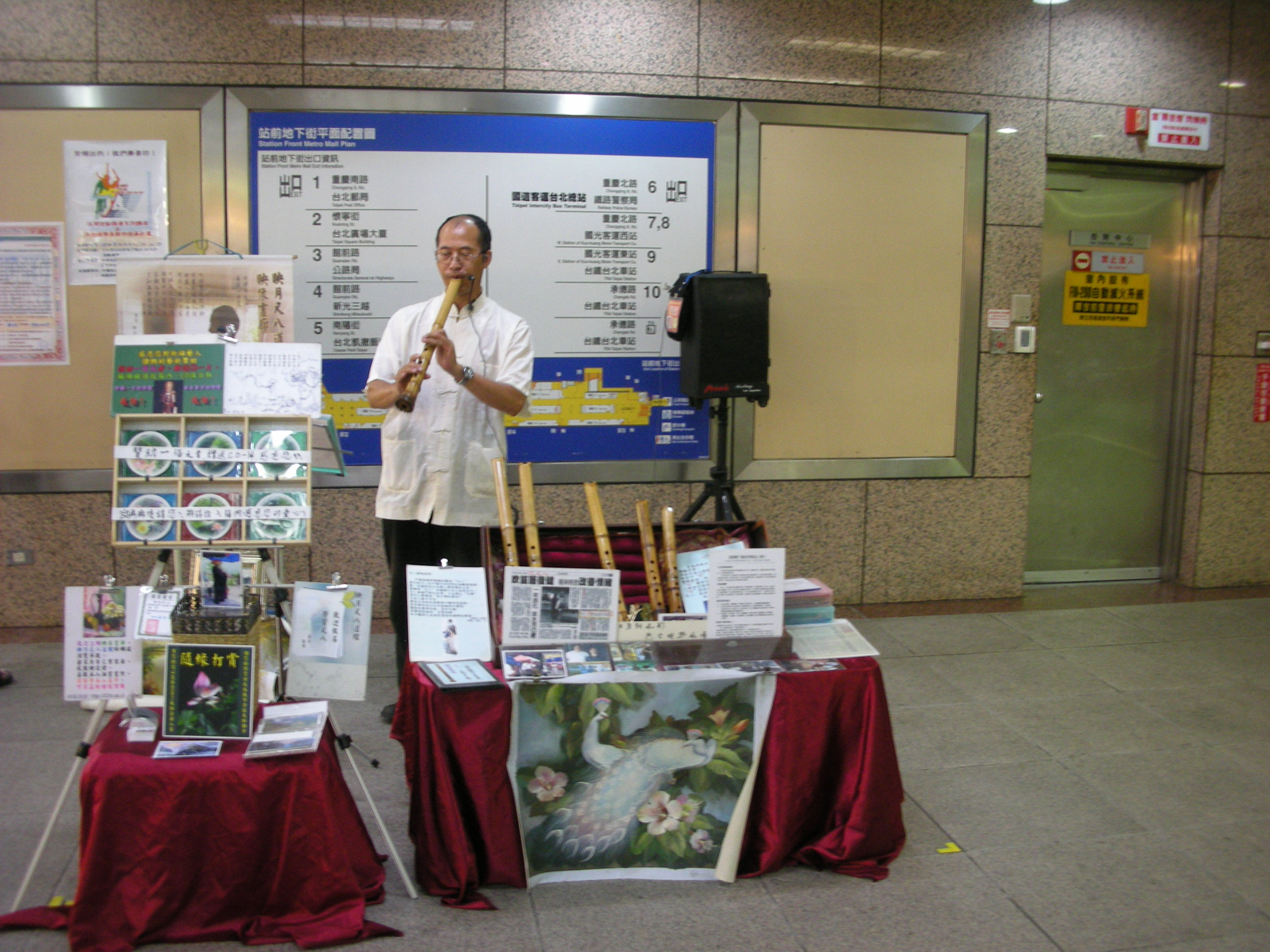
Street Musician

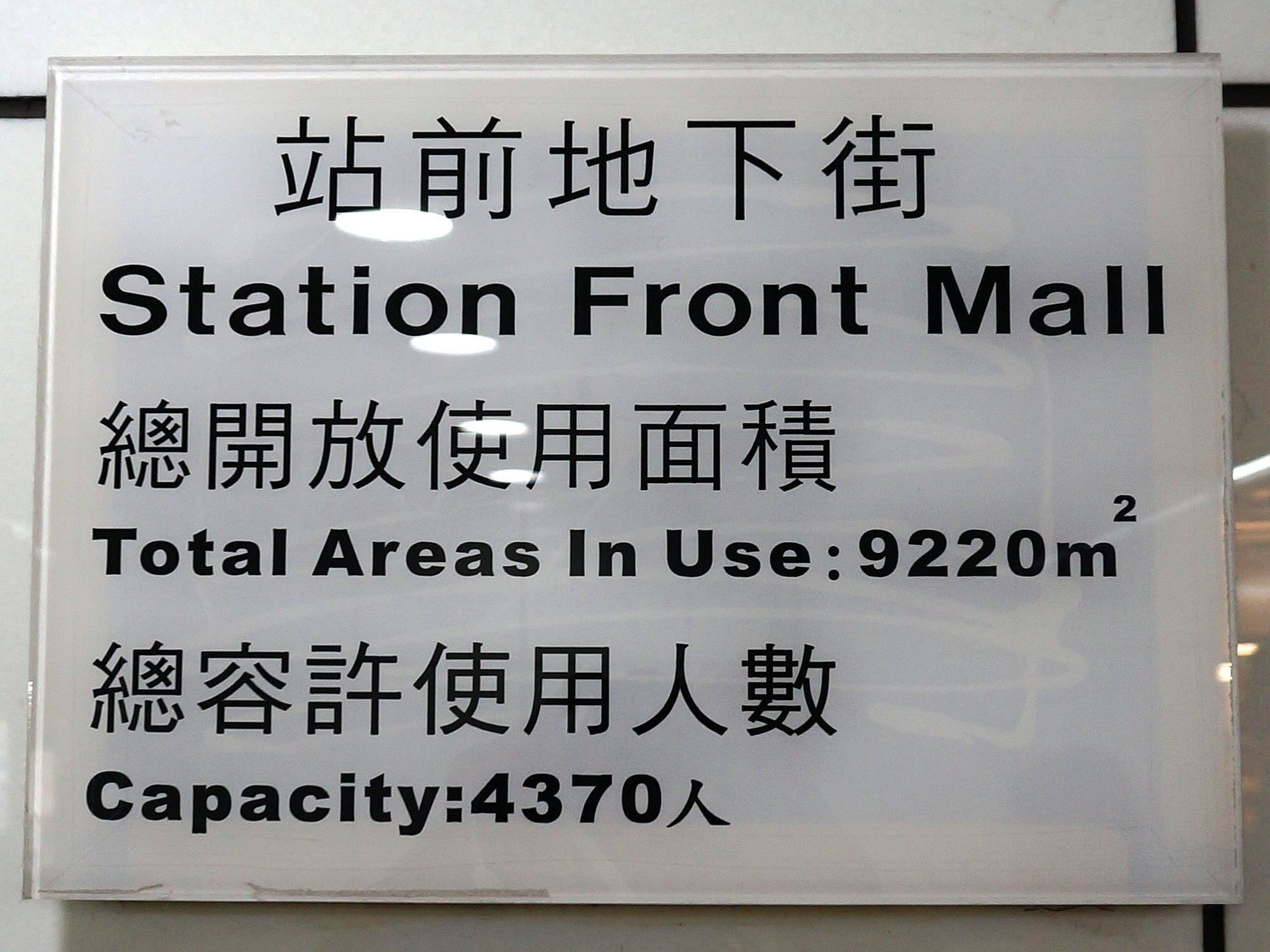

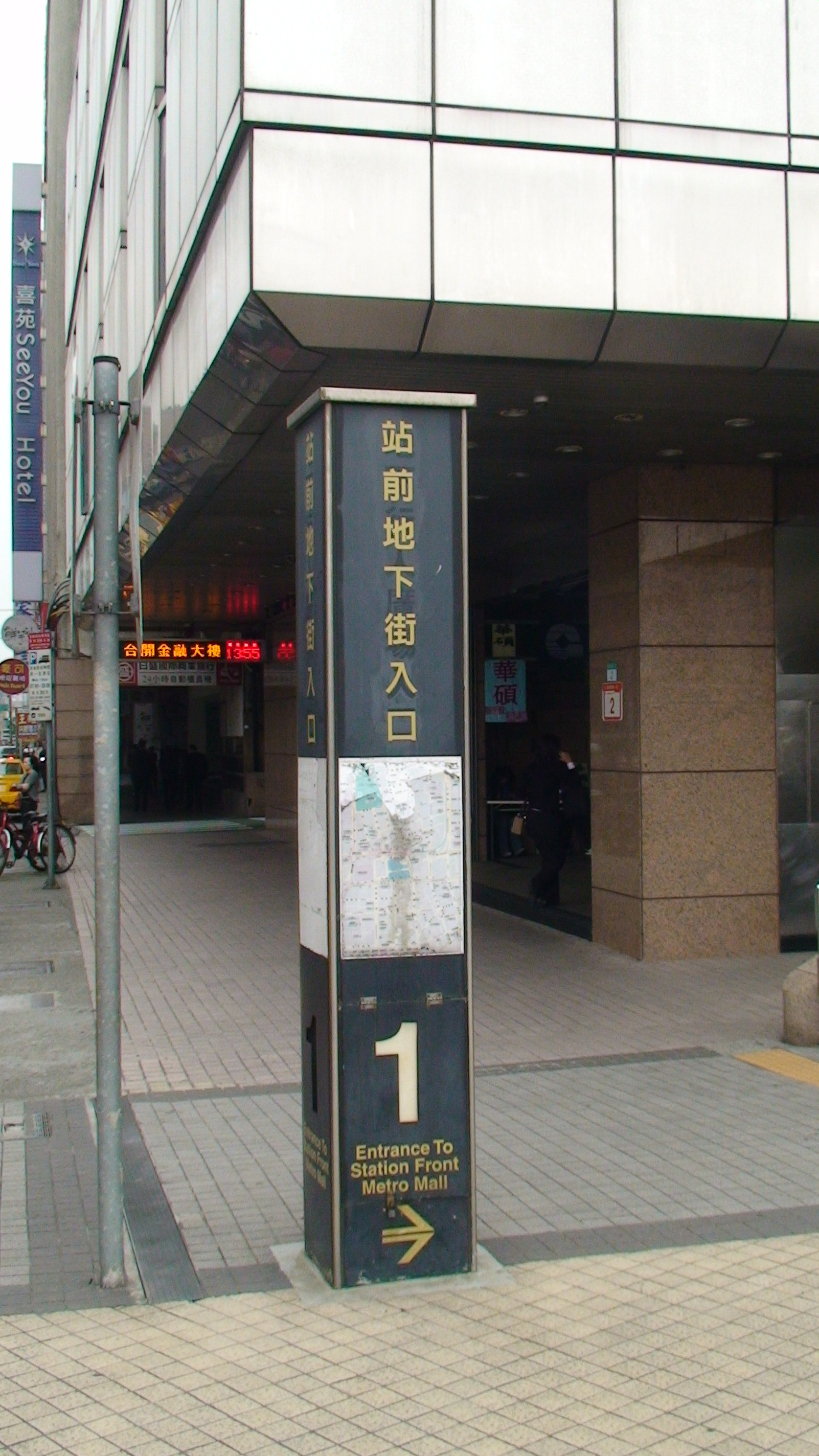
Entrance 1

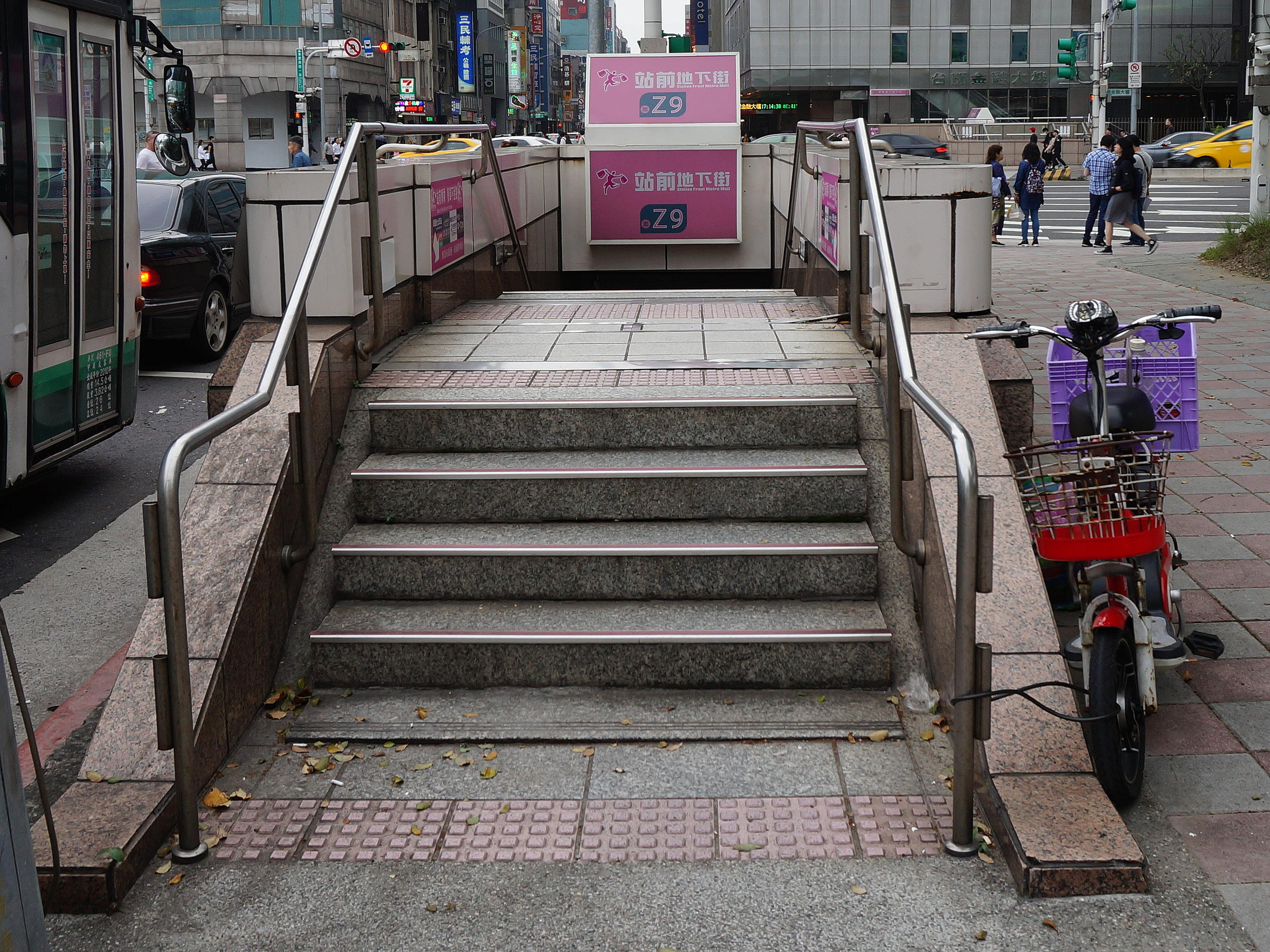
Exit Z9

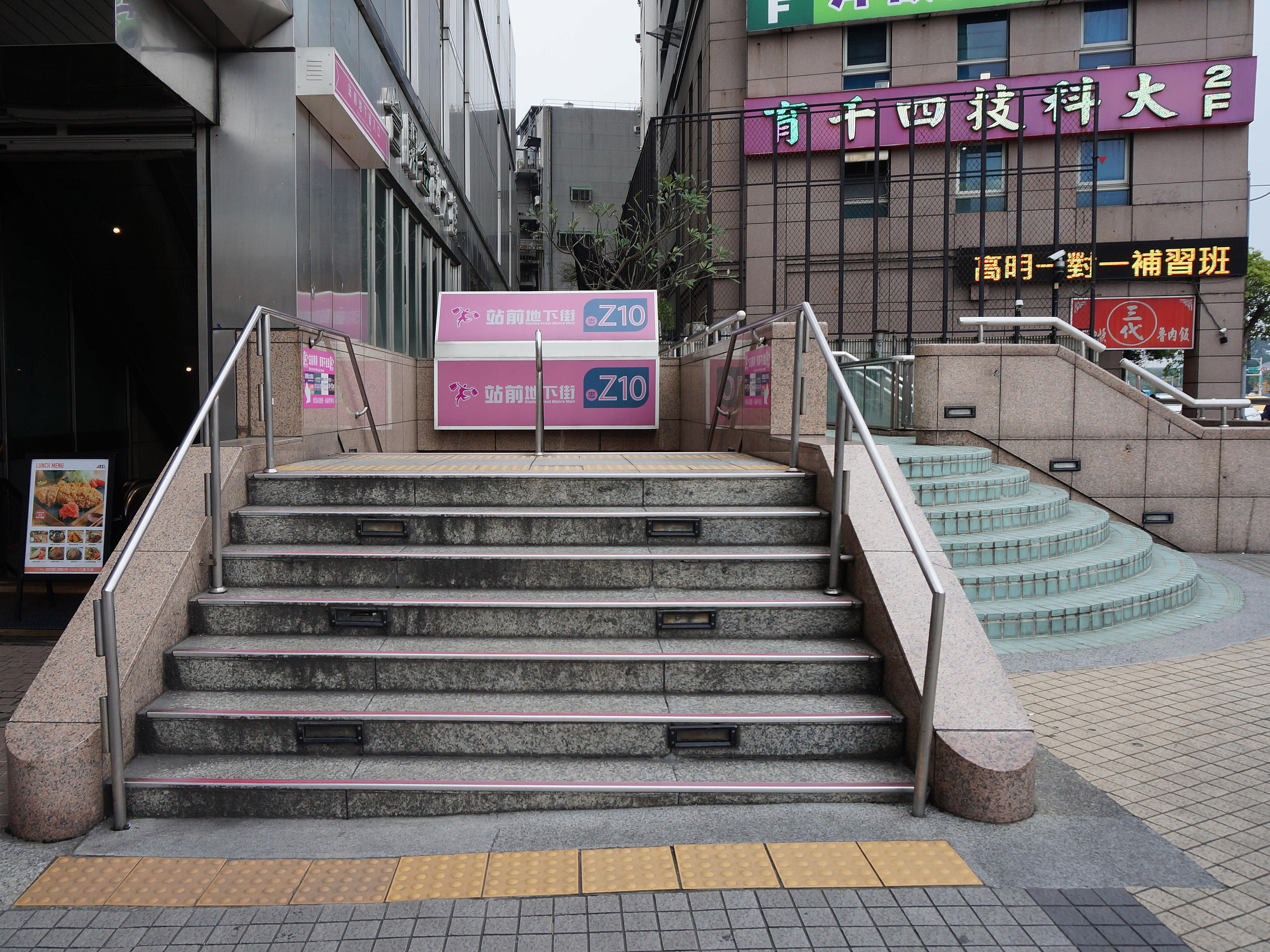
Exit Z10

== See also ==
- Zhongshan Metro Mall
- Taipei City Mall
- East Metro Mall
- List of shopping malls in Taipei
