= Zhongshan Metro Mall =

Shopping mall in Taipei, Taiwan

- 中山地下街
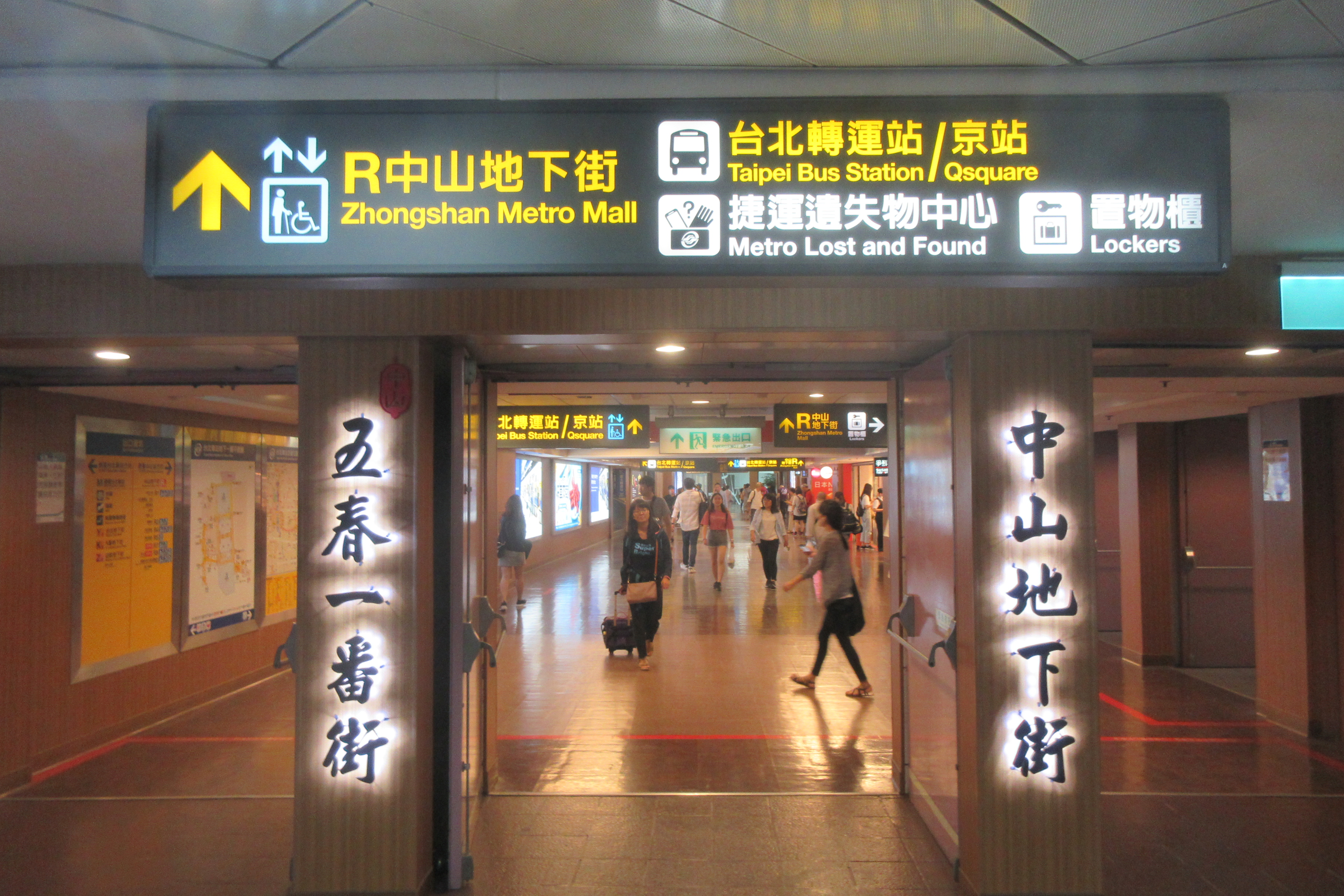
- Location: Zhongshan and Datong in Taipei, Taiwan
- Coordinates: 25.0504°N 121.5201°E
- Num. of stores: 81
- Public transit: Taipei Station; Zhongshan Station; Shuanglian Station

The Zhongshan Metro Shopping Mall (Chinese: 中山地下街; pinyin: Zhōngshān Dìxiàjiē) is an extensive underground shopping mall in Zhongshan District and Datong District, Taipei, Taiwan. It is located at Changan West Rd., No. 52-1. The mall stretches from Taipei Main Station in the south to Shuanglian Station in the north.

== Overview ==
The entire mall is 815 meters long and has 10 exits (plus 4 emergency exits). It was the first underground mall in Taipei. It has 81 shops.

== See also ==
- Zhongshan Station
- Taipei Underground Market
- Station Front Metro Mall
- East Metro Mall
- Taipei City Mall
