= Marriott Taipei =

Hotel in Zhongshan, Taipei, Taiwan

- 台北萬豪酒店
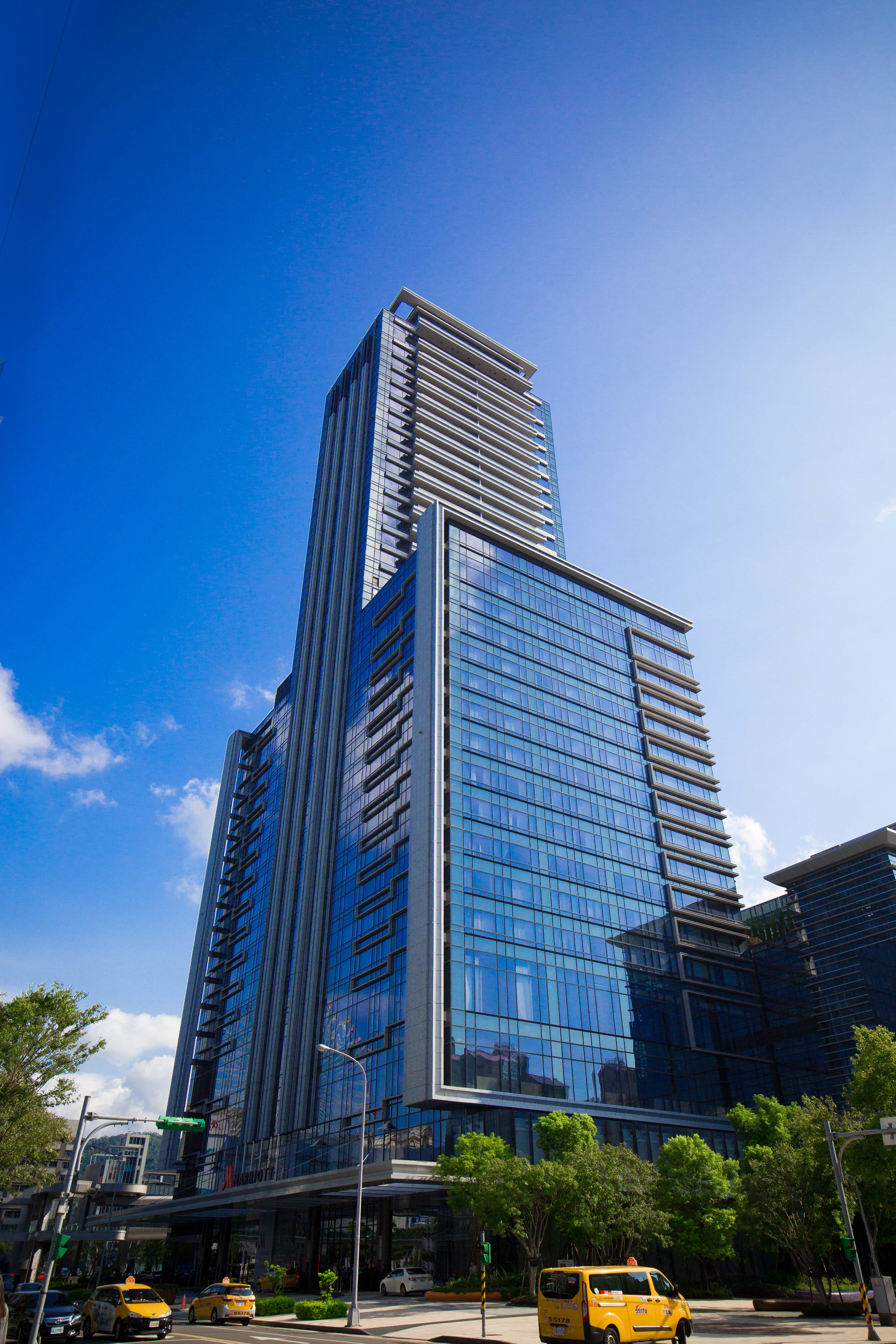
- Interactive map of the Marriott Taipei area

General information
- Status: Completed
- Type: hotel
- Location: 199 Lequn 2nd Road, Zhongshan District, Taipei, Taiwan
- Coordinates: 25°04′51″N 121°33′34″E
- Opened: 28 September 2015
- Owner: Marriott Hotel

Other information
- Number of rooms: 502
- Number of restaurants: 5
- Public transit: Jiannan Road metro station

Website
- Official website

Marriott Taipei is a hotel on Lequn 2nd Road, Zhongshan District, Taipei, Taiwan. The hotel is located in Block C of the Yihwa International Complex and is the first Marriott Hotel in Taiwan. With a total of 502 rooms and 5 restaurants, the hotel started trial operations on August 24, 2015, and officially opened on September 28, 2015. The hotel features a unique view of the Taipei skyline from the rooms and is one of the top luxury hotels in the city. The lower floors of the building houses a shopping center TM Midtown, which opened on 10 November 2017.

== Location ==
The closest metro station to the hotel is Jiannan Road metro station located on the Wenhu line of Taipei Metro. The hotel is within walking distance of Miramar Entertainment Park, ATT e Life, NOKE shopping center and Grand Mayfull Hotel Taipei.

== See also ==
- ATT e Life
- Grand Mayfull Hotel Taipei
- Hotel Indigo Taipei North
