= Hotel Indigo Taipei North =

Hotel in Zhongshan, Taipei, Taiwan

- 臺北大直英迪格酒店
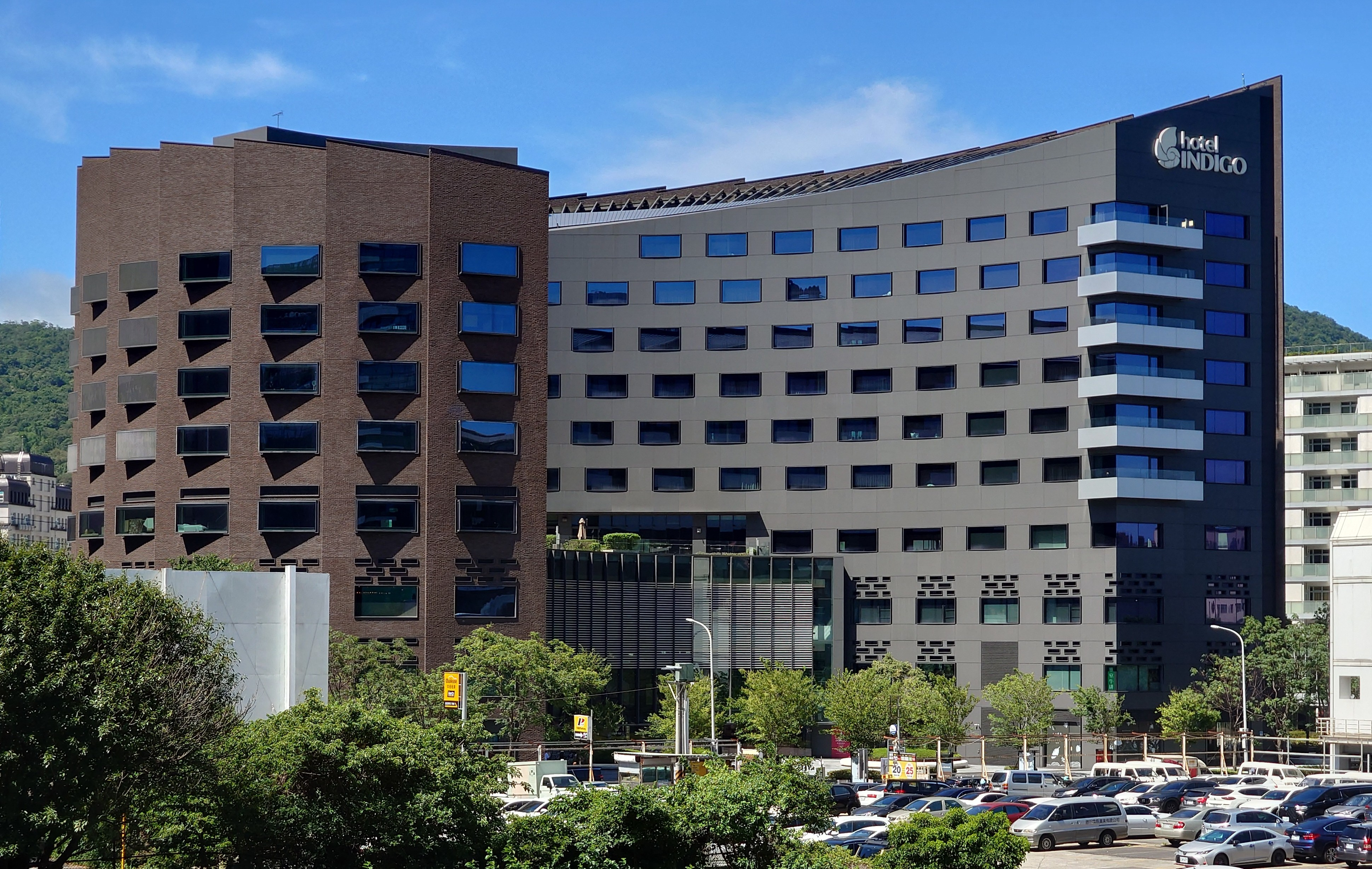
- Interactive map of the Hotel Indigo Taipei North area

General information
- Status: Completed
- Type: Hotel
- Location: 200 Zhifu Road, Zhongshan District, Taipei, Taiwan
- Coordinates: 25°04′59″N 121°33′36″E
- Opened: 12 February 2020
- Owner: Hotel Indigo

Other information
- Number of rooms: 149
- Public transit: Jiannan Road metro station

Website
- Official website

Hotel Indigo Taipei North is located on Zhifu Road, Zhongshan District, Taipei, Taiwan. In 2016, it became part of the Hotel Indigo chain. It was developed and constructed by Yonghong Group, and is operated and managed by the InterContinental Hotel under the Hotel Indigo brand. It is the ninth business base of InterContinental Hotel in Taiwan, and the third Indigo brand hotel. With a total of 149 rooms, the hotel started trial operations on 1 January 2020, and officially opened on 12 February 2020. The lower floors of the building houses a shopping center Chun Place, which opened in September 2020.

== See also ==
- ATT e Life
- Grand Mayfull Hotel Taipei
- Marriott Taipei
