= NOKE =

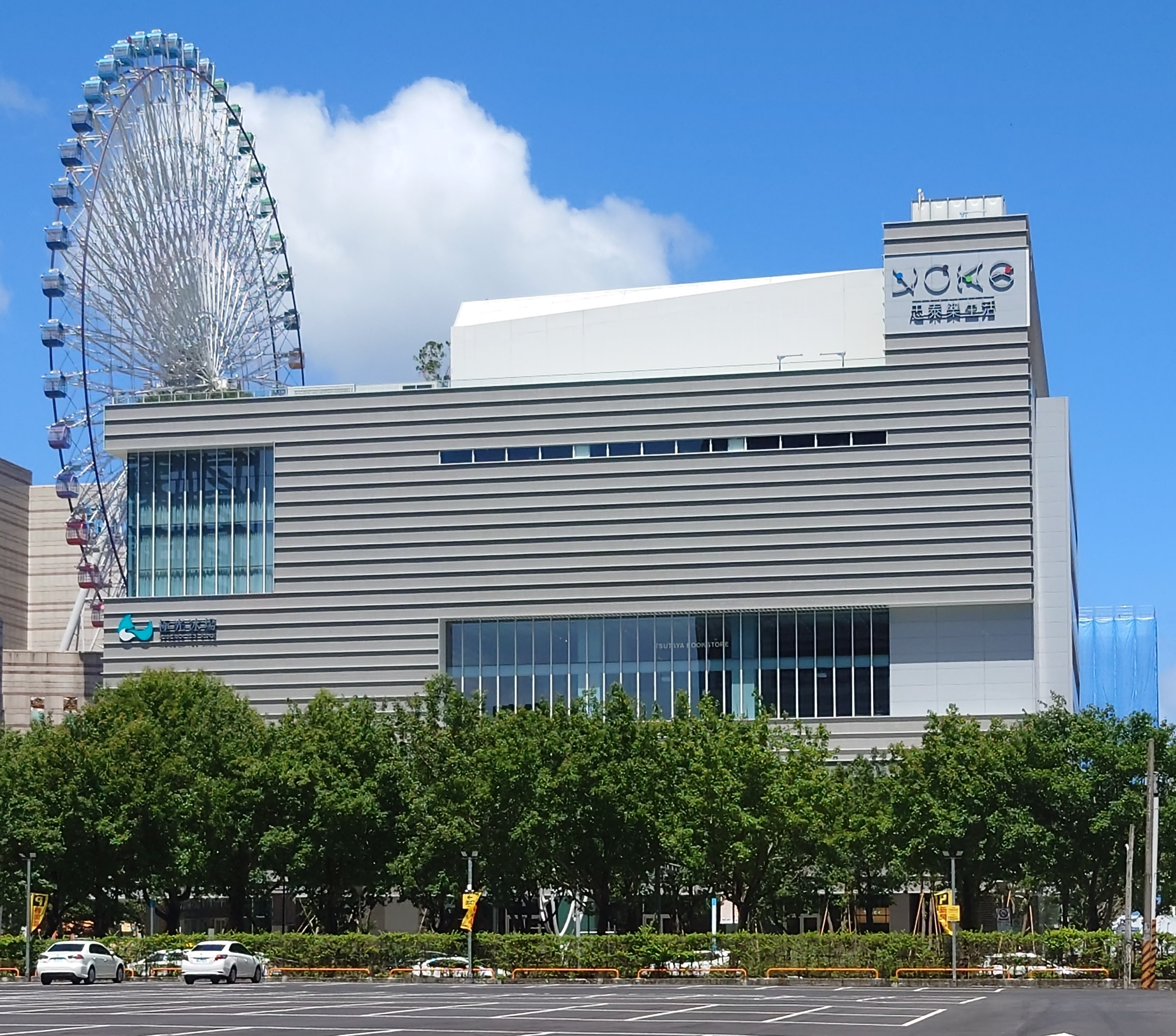
- Location: No. 200, Lequn 3rd Road, Zhongshan District, Taipei, Taiwan
- Coordinates: 25°4′56″N 121°33′26″E
- Opened: 29 April 2023
- Num. of stores: 100
- Floors: 7 floors above ground 3 floors below ground
- Public transit: Jiannan Road metro station
- Website: https://retail.jut.com.tw/

NOKE (Chinese: NOKE忠泰樂生活) is a shopping mall in the Dazhi area of Zhongshan District, Taipei, Taiwan that began trial operations on 29 April 2023. With a total floor area of 36,300 m^{2} (391,000 sq ft), it has 7 floors above ground and 3 floors below ground. Main core stores include Tsutaya Bookstore, Michelin restaurant La Vie, Apu Jan, Onibus and Aurora Ice Rink. The proportion of shopping malls is 48% for retail, 34% for catering, and 18% for entertainment.

== Transportation ==
The mall can be accessed via the Jiannan Road metro station on the Wenhu line of Taipei Metro.

== See also ==
- List of tourist attractions in Taiwan
- List of shopping malls in Taipei
- ATT e Life
- Miramar Entertainment Park
