= ATT 4 FUN =

Shopping mall in Xinyi, Taipei, Taiwan

- Location: No. 12, Songshou Road, Xinyi, Taipei, Taiwan
- Coordinates: 25.03548°N 121.56600°E
- Opened: 29 August 2011
- Manager: ATT4FUN CO., LTD
- Architect: Kris Yao
- Floors: 10 floors above ground 3 floors below ground
- Public transit: Taipei 101–World Trade Center metro station
- Website: http://www.att4fun.com.tw/

ATT 4 FUN is a shopping mall in Xinyi Planning District, Taipei, Taiwan that opened on August 29, 2011. The name "ATT" stands for "attractive". Using the homonym of "FOR", the letters are changed to the number "4", which represents the four major industries of fashion, cultural creation, entertainment, and food. "FUN" combines fashion shopping with eating, drinking, playing, and fun, bringing all-round joy to a better life.

== History ==
The building ATT 4 FUN currently occupies was originally operated by New York New York Shopping Center, which opened in March 2000. However, in August 2010, due to a cumulative loss of NT$1.8 billion since its opening 9 years, the operation of the mall was closed for refurbishment and reopened under the name ATT 4 FUN on August 29, 2011. ATT 4 FUN introduced international fashion brands, American and Japanese street fashion brands, lifestyle design styles, international themed restaurants, a performing arts hall, Sky Lounge Bar and other facilities. The seventh to eighth floors above the ground are stationed by the group's own brand "ATT Show Box". The main venue on the seventh floor covers an area of about 3,300 m^{2} (36,000 sq ft), with a ceiling height of 9 m (30 ft), with more than 2,000 spectator seats. A lift for cars to enter and exit is suitable for large-scale exhibitions, pop music, and art performances.

In September 2014, the "Dream Dessert Paradise" on the fourth level opened. The well-known Japanese space design team planned and designed the theme of Alice in Wonderland. The project was the first in Taiwan to convert the entire mall floor into a dessert area. In 2016, ATT 4 FUN's annual revenue exceeded 5 billion yuan. There are skybridges connecting the second floor of the ATT 4 FUN shopping mall with Taipei Xinyi Vieshow Studios, Taipei Nan Shan Plaza, and Taipei 101.

== Gallery ==
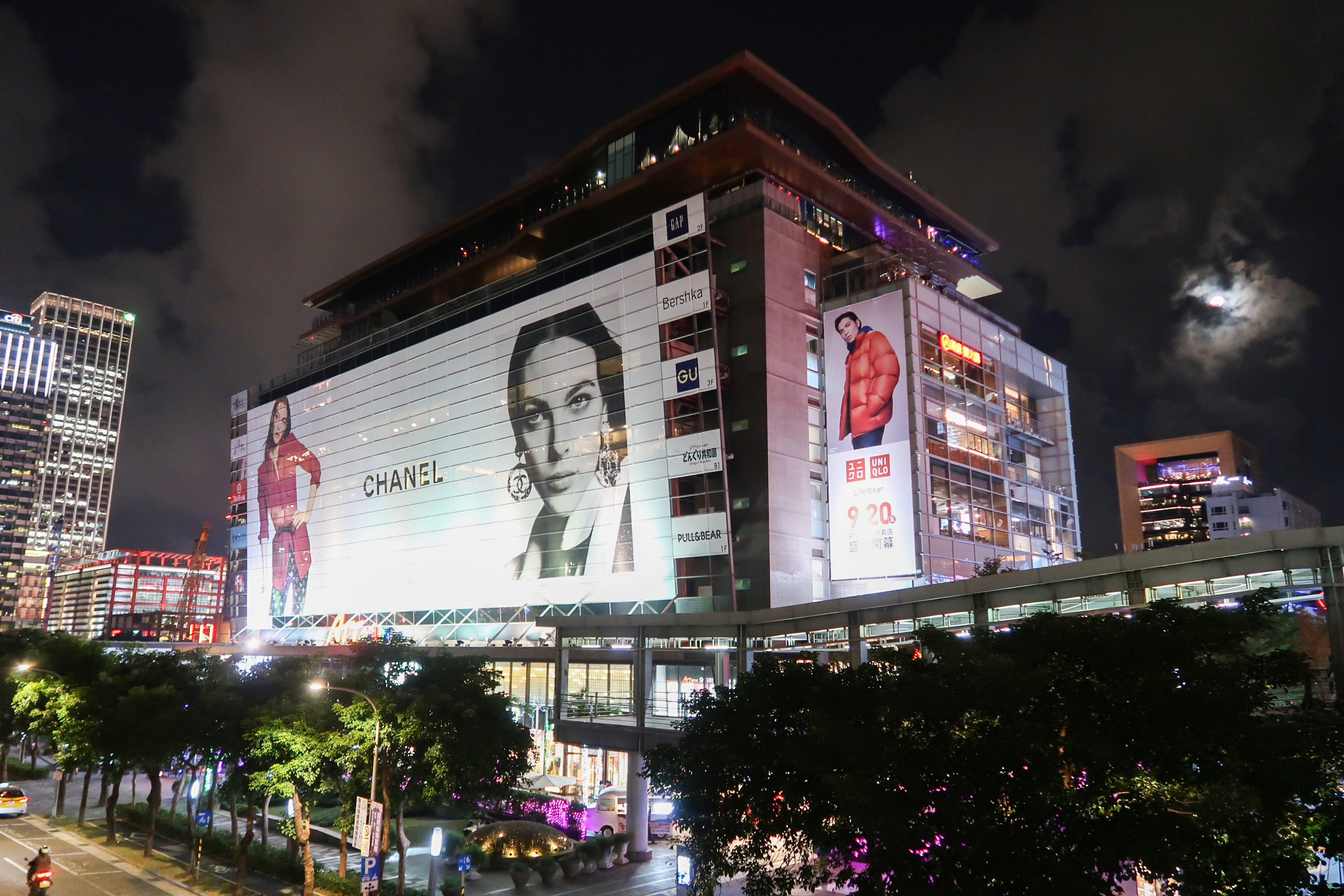
At night

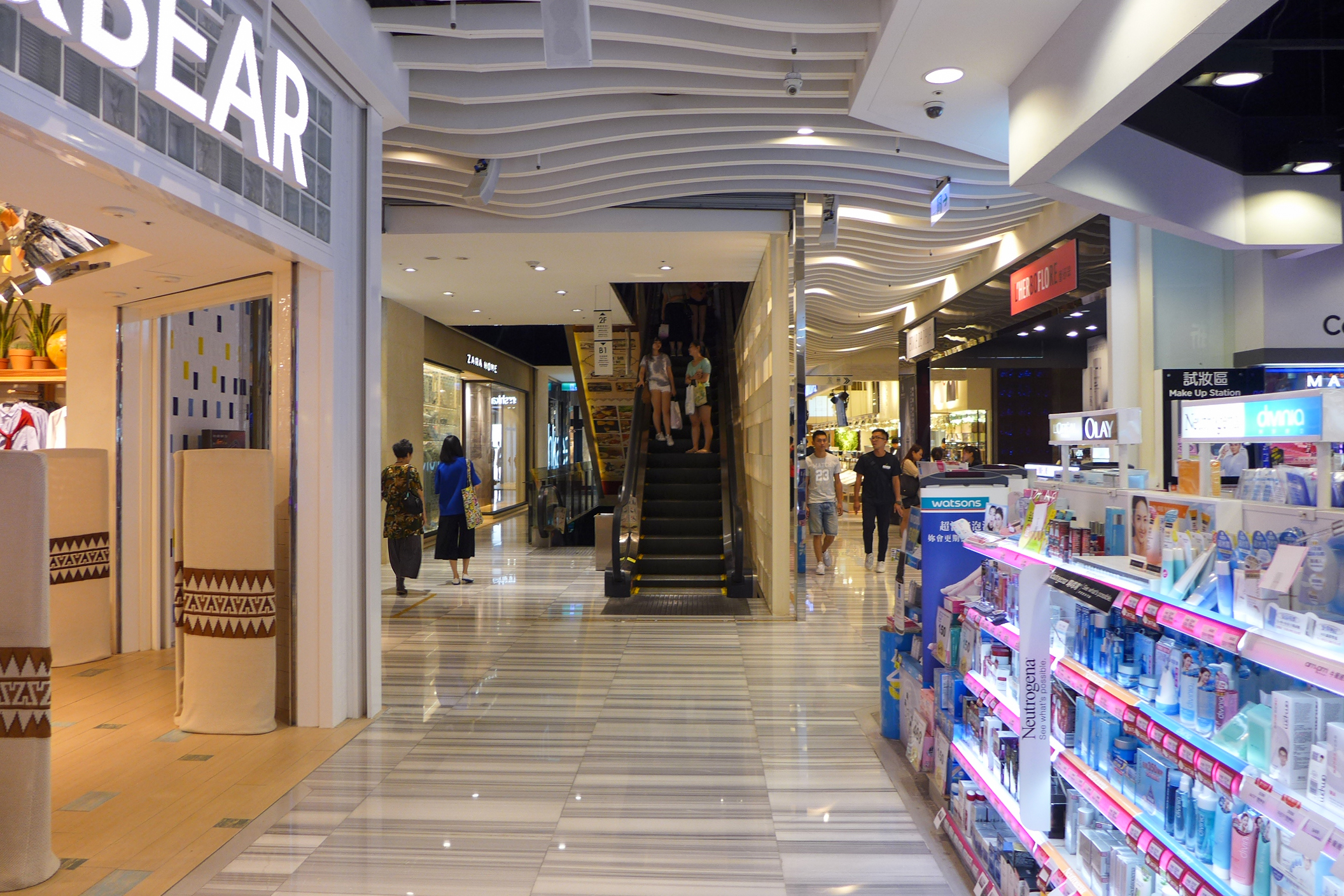
Level 1

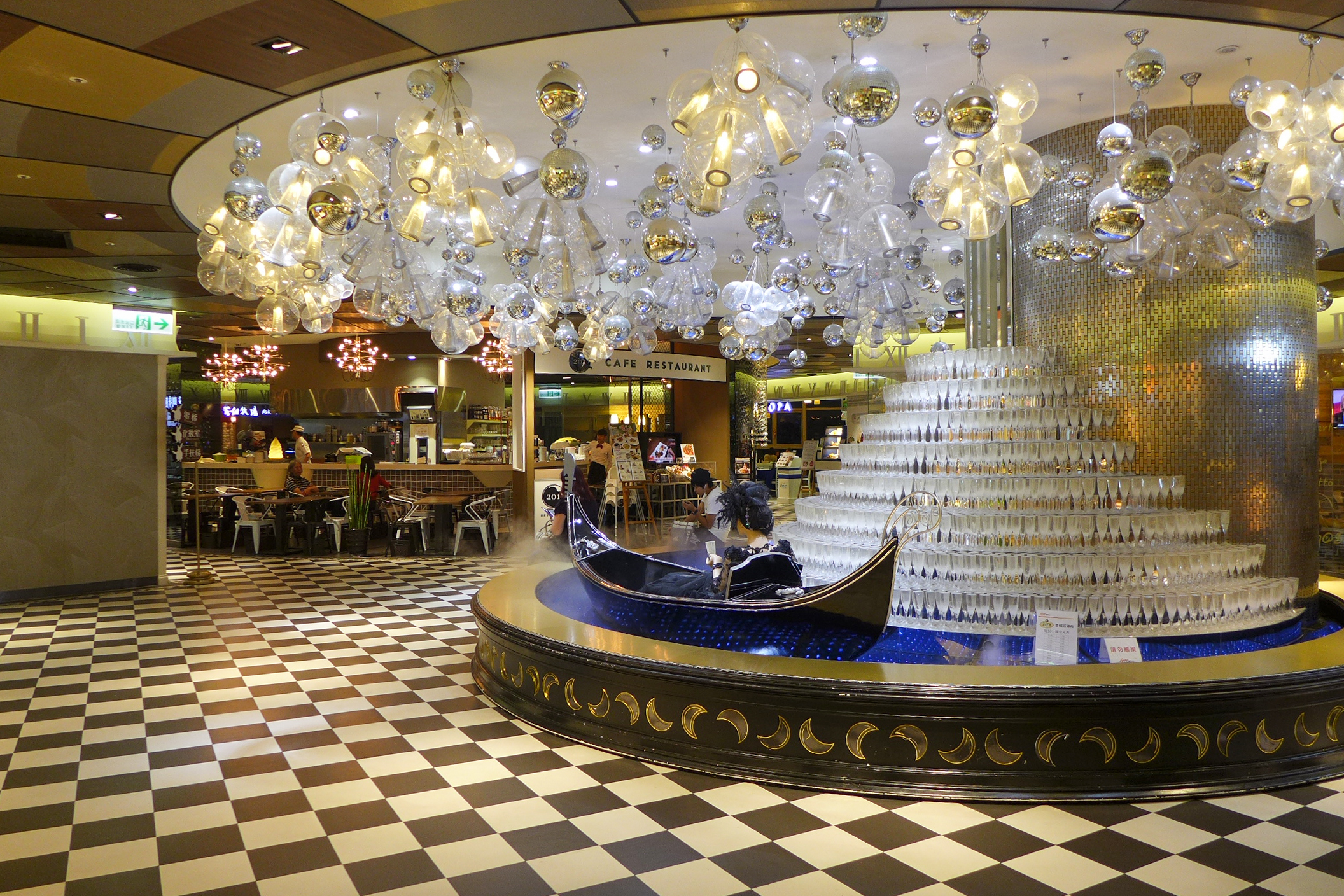
Level 4

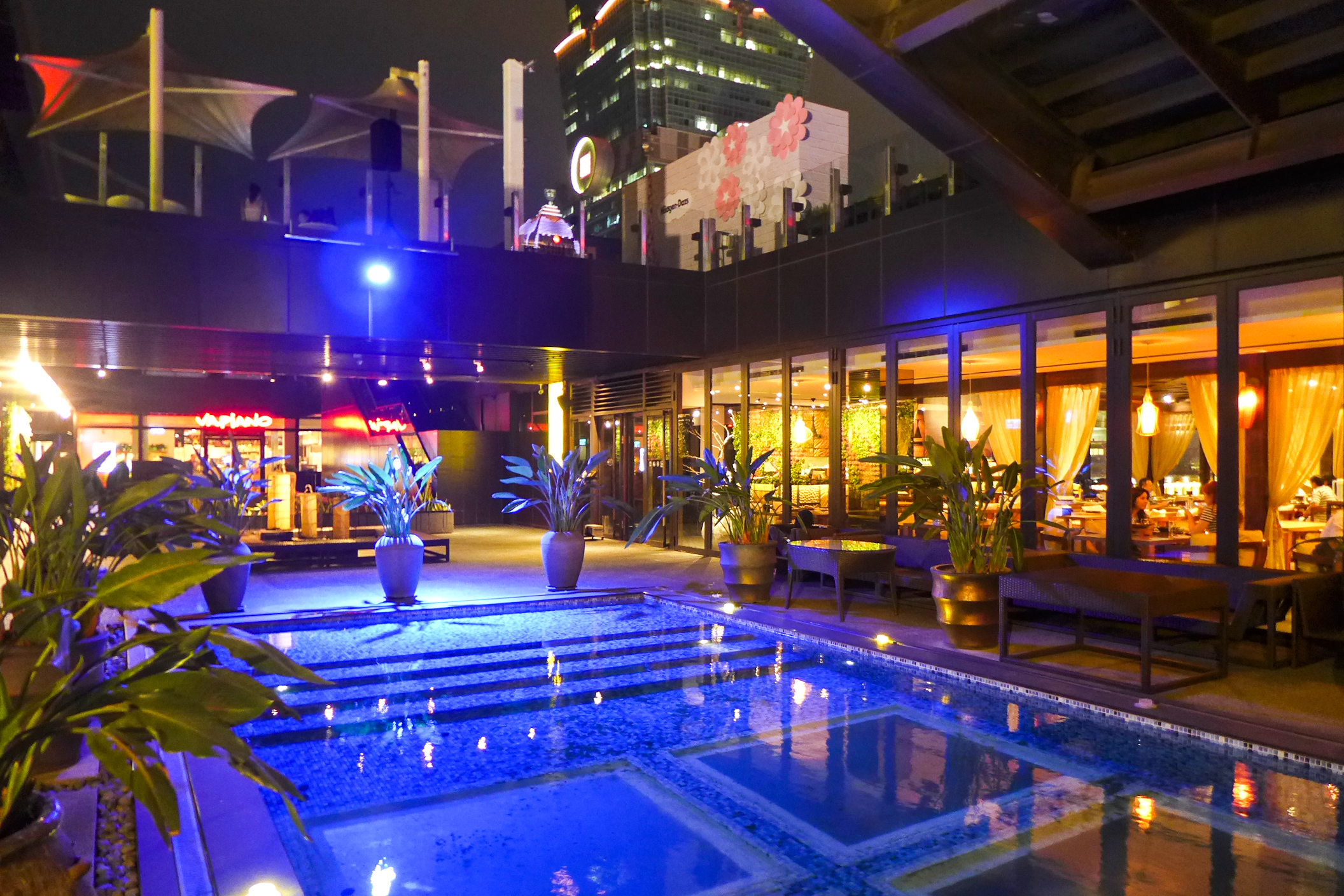
Level 10 Outdoor Terrace

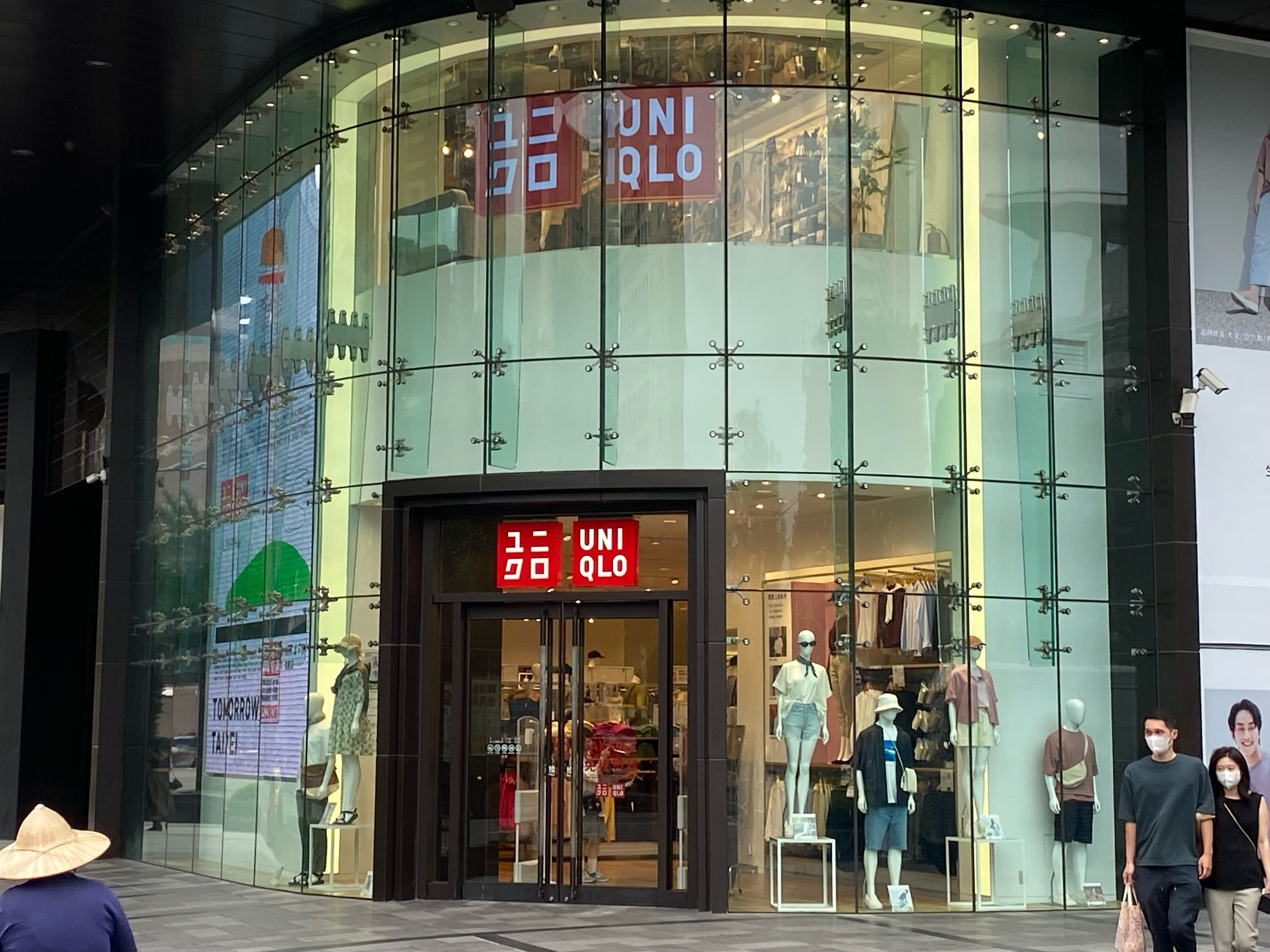
Uniqlo store

== See also ==
- List of tourist attractions in Taiwan
- List of shopping malls in Taipei
- ATT 4 Recharge
