= Taipei Nan Shan Plaza =

Office building, department store in Xinyi, Taipei, Taiwan

- 臺北南山廣場
- Taipei Nan Shan Plaza in 2019 from Taipei 101
- Interactive map of the Taipei Nan Shan Plaza area

General information
- Type: Office building, department store
- Location: Xinyi District, Taipei, Taiwan
- Coordinates: 25.0344°N 121.5669°E
- Construction started: 17 December 2014
- Opened: 11 June 2018

Height
- Height: 272 meters (892 ft)

Technical details
- Floor count: 48 (and 4 basement floors)
- Floor area: 193,843 m^{2} (2,086,510 sq ft)

Design and construction
- Architecture firm: Mitsubishi Jisho Sekkei Inc.

Website
- 臺北南山廣場.台灣

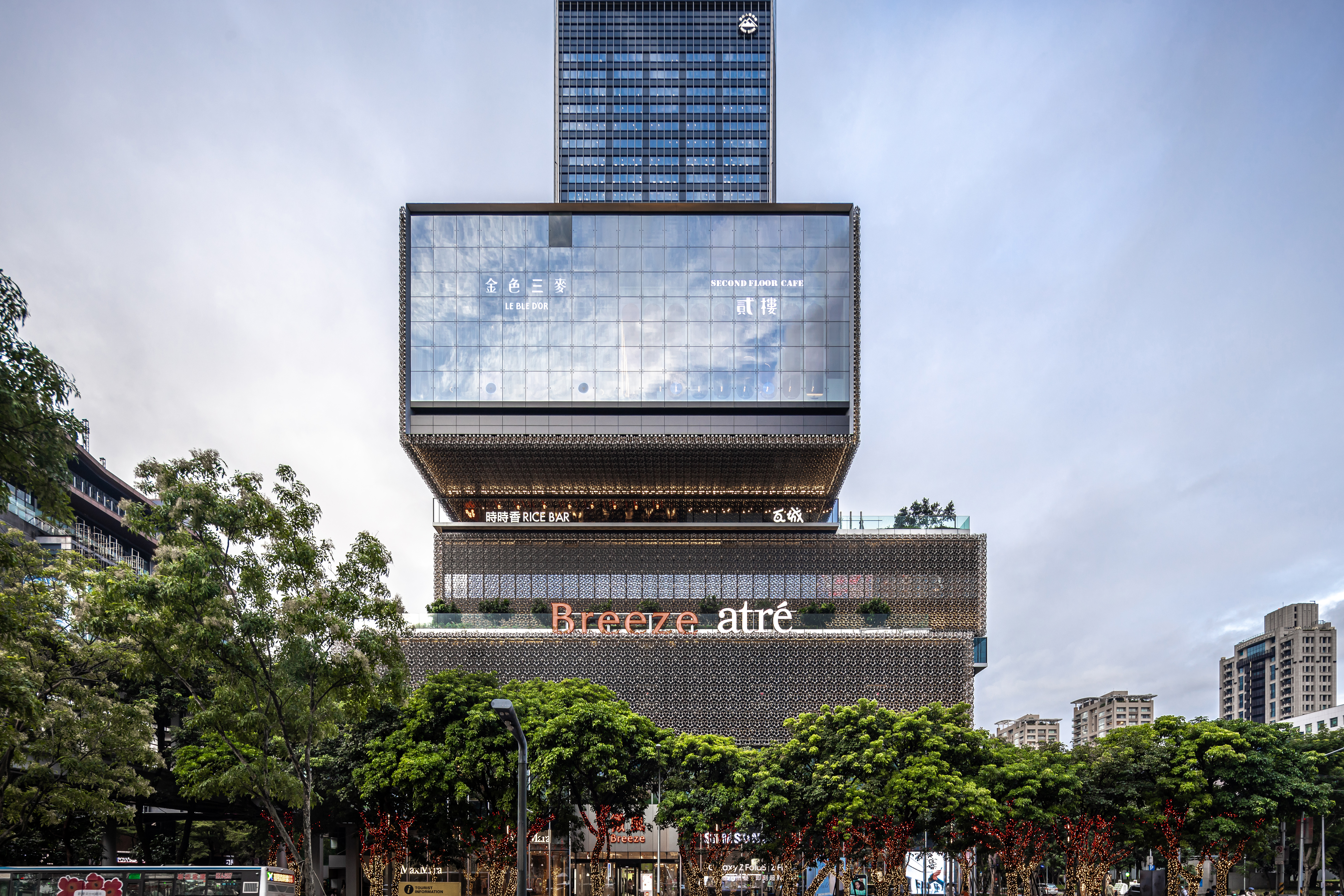
Taipei Nan Shan in 2023

Taipei Nan Shan Plaza (Chinese: 臺北南山廣場; pinyin: Táiběi Nánshān Guǎngchǎng) is a skyscraper in Xinyi Special District, Xinyi, Taipei, Taiwan. It is the third tallest building in Taipei (after Taipei 101 and The Sky Taipei) and the fourth tallest building in Taiwan (after Taipei 101, 85 Sky Tower and The Sky Taipei). As of 2019, it is the 146th-tallest building in Asia and 248th-tallest building in the world. The building was constructed by and named for Nan Shan Insurance.

== Architecture ==
It was designed by Japanese architecture firm Mitsubishi Jisho Design Inc. The height of building is 272 m (892 ft), the floor area is 192,154.99 m^{2} (2,068,339.1 sq ft), and it comprises 48 floors above ground, as well as 5 basement levels. The lower level shopping mall is operated by Breeze Center.

The architectural plan of Taipei Nan Shan Plaza consists of three parts: a 7-story complex mall, a 48-story tower, and a diamond-shaped entrance building with an open art space. The 272-meter-tall tower is now the third tallest building in Taipei, and will be the highest-ranking office building in East Asia, with the aim of becoming the first choice for multinational companies to set up corporate headquarters.

The complex shopping mall is from the 3rd floor to the 7th floor. It introduces international fashion brands, which are expected to drive the fashion trend of Taipei. The wide and traversable shopping malls ease the dense visuals of skyscrapers in the Xinyi Special District as well as providing an open view for the public. At the same time, the basement will plan 31 parking spaces for buses and large vehicles, in order to effectively solve issues with parking.

As for the diamond-type architectural design of Songren Road in the east, considering the requirements of Taipei as a global city, Taipei Nan Shan Plaza includes public art spaces of about 1600m^{2}. After completion, it will be used as an important venue for receiving foreign guests and important ceremonies. The use of fundraising activities can also be provided to public welfare arts and cultural activities or small-scale commercial activities, art exhibitions, etc., which can inject more art and culture into the Xinyi District where financial and commercial gatherings are concentrated.

In addition, the surroundings of the tower will be planned with a number of open green public spaces, combined with parks, sidewalks and bicycle lanes, with benches between the mall and the office building.

Another major feature of Taipei Nan Shan Plaza is that it will connect the surrounding buildings such as Taipei 101, ATT 4 FUN and Vieshow Cinema with underground passages or pedestrian bridges, and connect the core area of Xinyi Business Circle into a three-dimensional pedestrian network. The existing flat walkway and plaza space allow the public to directly transfer from the MRT "Taipei 101/World Trade Center" via Taipei Nanshan Plaza and the Xinyi Business Circle to the Taipei City Hall Bus Station. It will also cooperate with Taipei 101 after its completion to create an even better New Year's fireworks show.

Level	Use
43	Pfizer
42	Pfizer
41	Hoffmann-La Roche
40	Hoffmann-La Roche
39	Chanel
38	VMware
37	The Executive Centre
36	Teng Yun Technology Pte. Ltd.
35	Facebook
34	The Executive Centre
33	E.SUN Commercial Bank
32	Apple Taiwan
31	Apple Taiwan
30	Dentsu Taiwan
29	Dentsu Taiwan
28	BlackRock
27	Deloitte Consulting (Pacific) Limited
26	Reuters/LSEG FTSE Russell
25	Mechanical layer
24	Mechanical layer
23	Aifuyue Singapore
22	Deloitte & Touche
21	Deloitte & Touche
20	Deloitte & Touche
19	Deloitte & Touche
18	Deloitte & Touche
17	Deloitte & Touche
16	Deloitte & Touche
15	Seiko Epson Taiwan
14	
13	
12	Amazon Taiwan
11	TSAR & TSAI LAW FIRM
10	Dentsu Taiwan
9	Dentsu Taiwan
8	Dentsu Taiwan
7	Deloitte & Touche
6	Mitsubishi Estate Taiwan

== Gallery ==
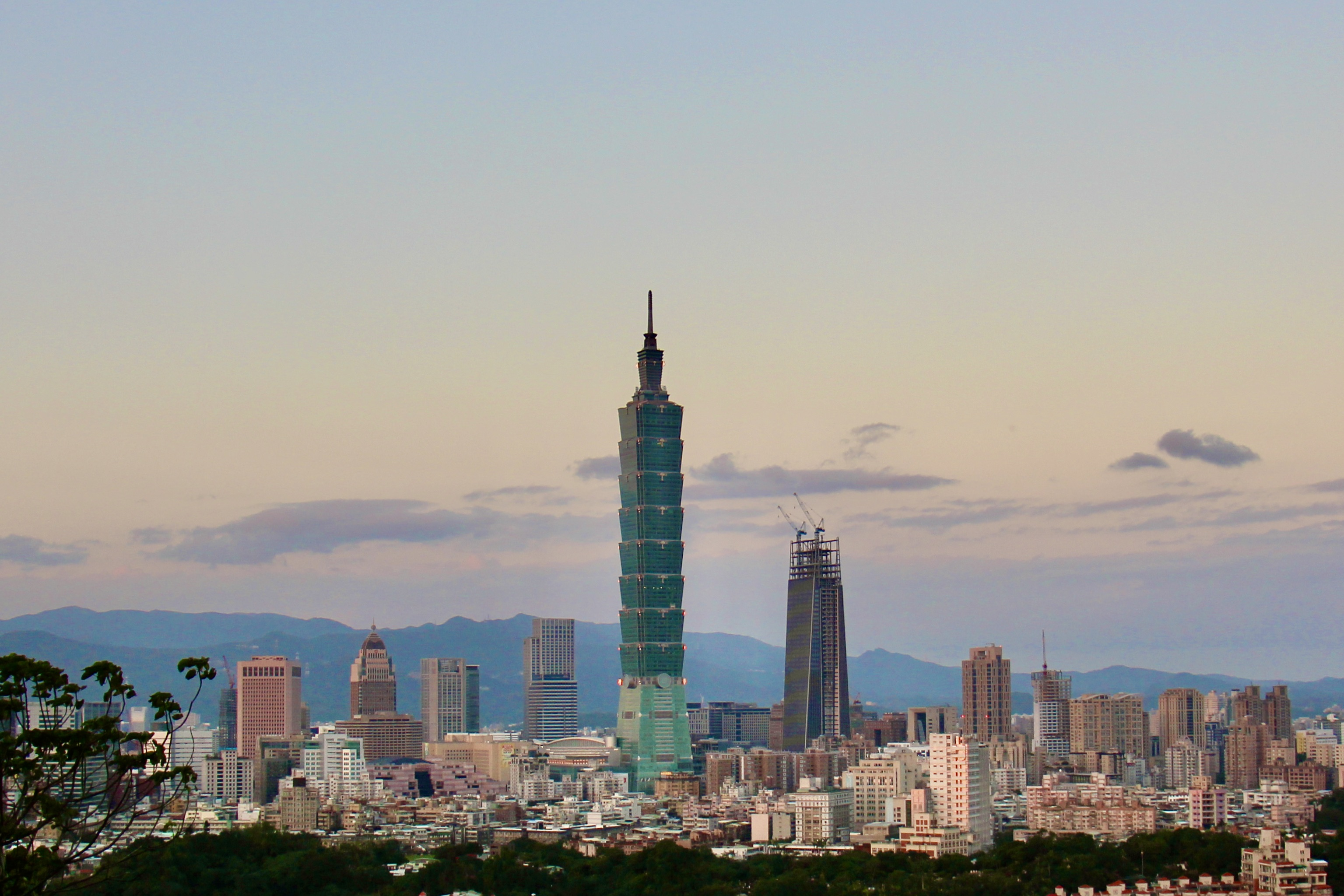
Taipei Nan Shan Plaza, visible on the right of Taipei 101.

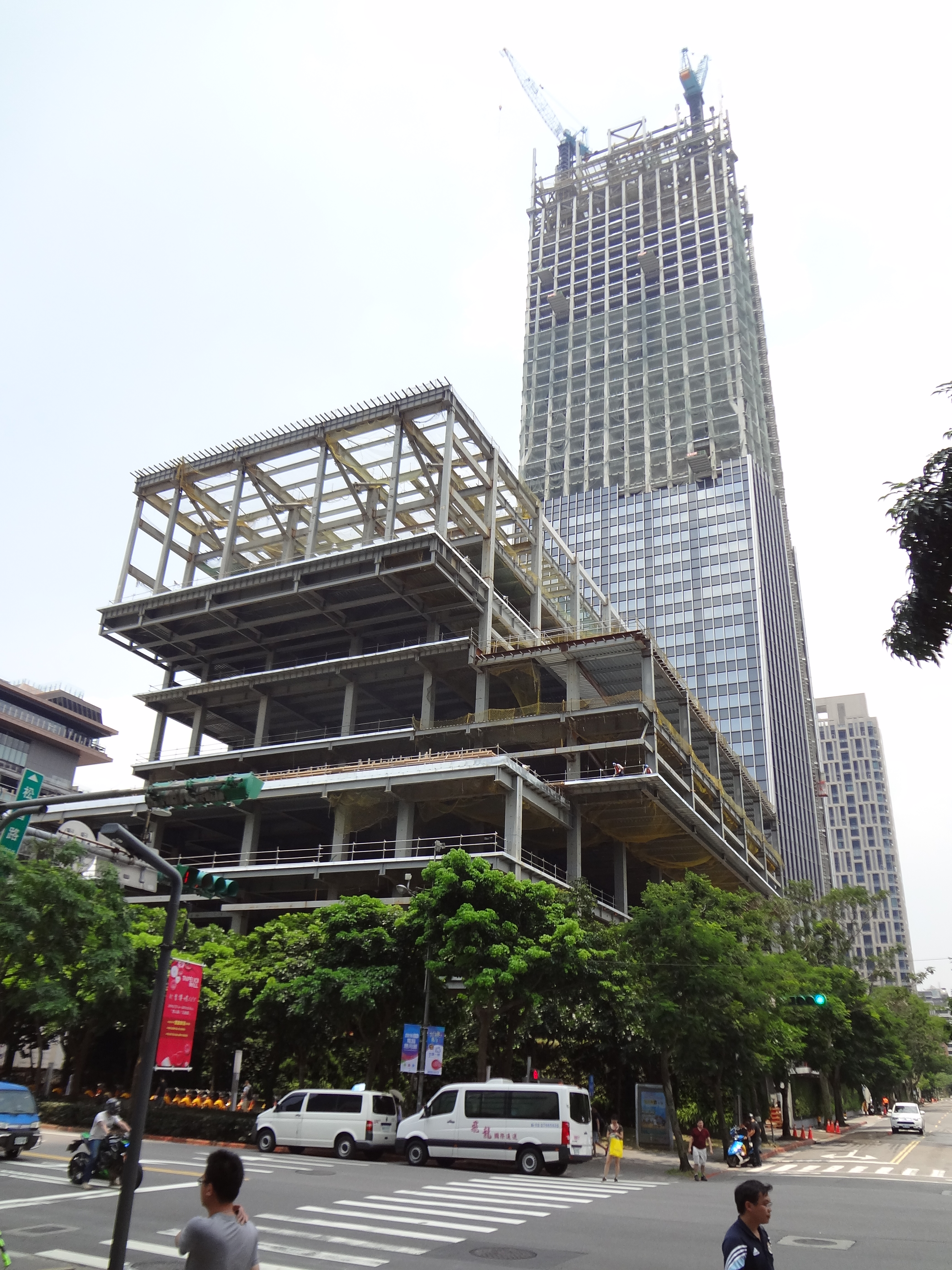
Taipei Nan Shan Plaza under construction in 2016.

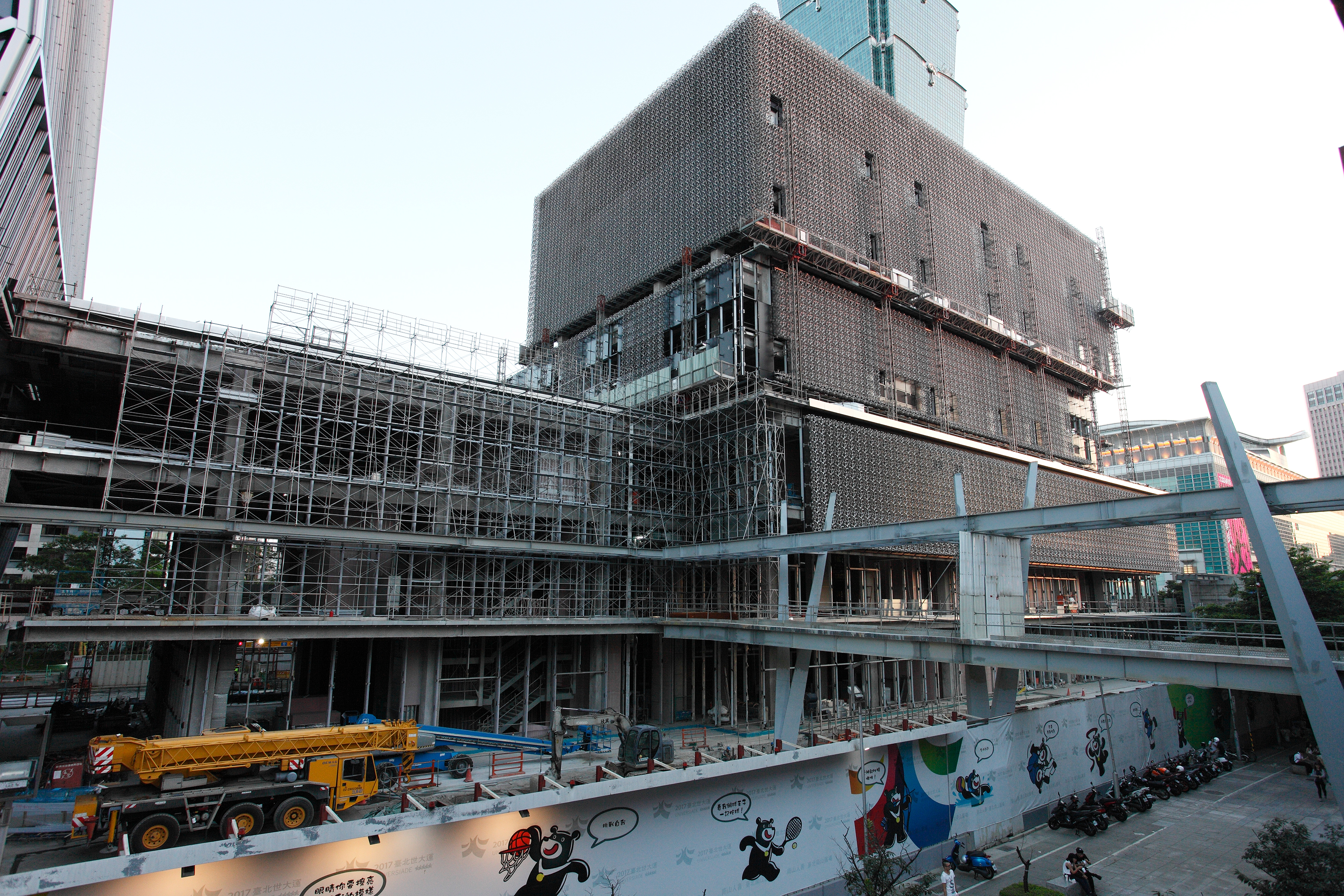
Taipei Nan Shan Plaza under construction in 2017.

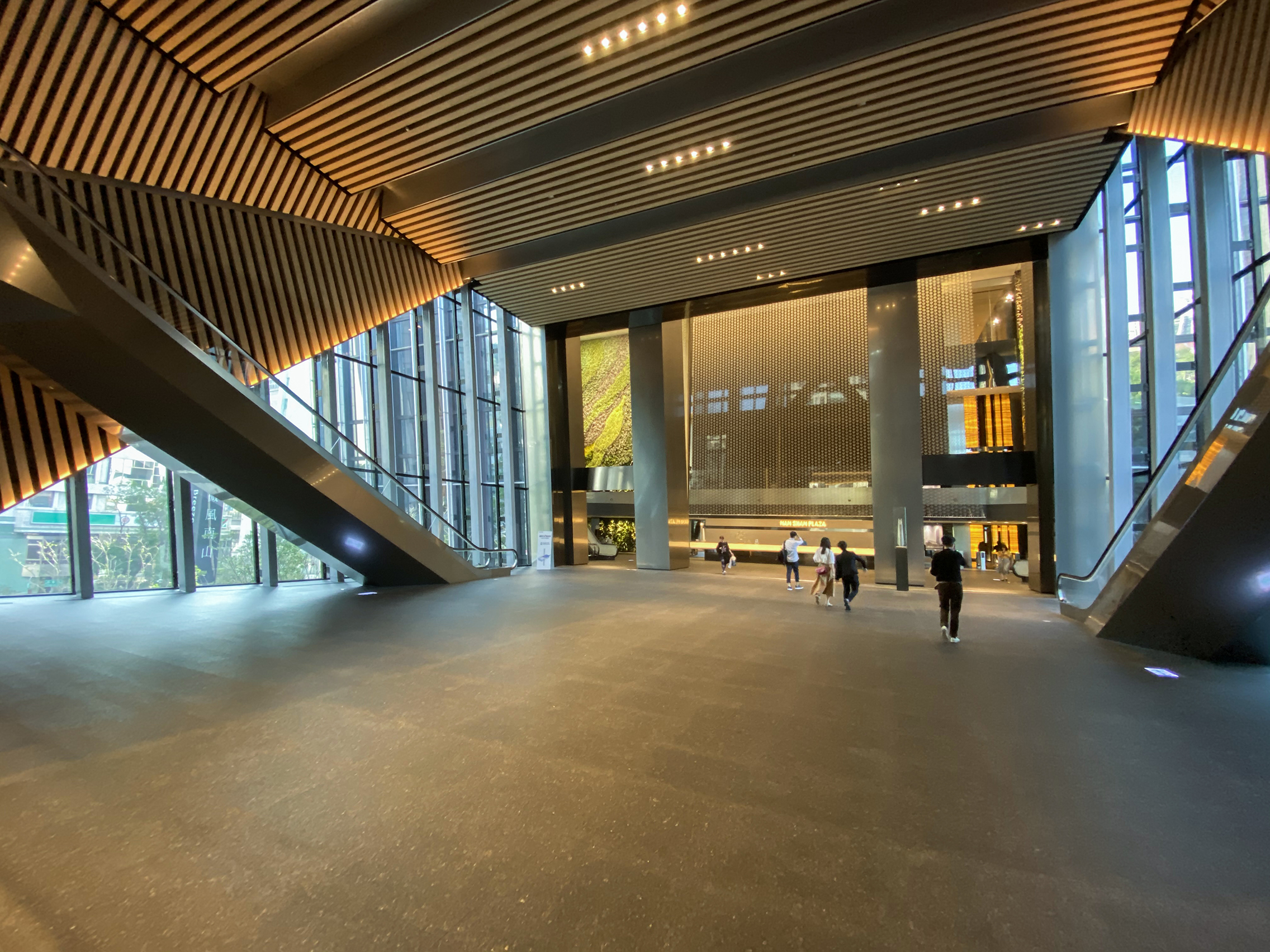
Taipei Nan Shan Plaza Office lobby

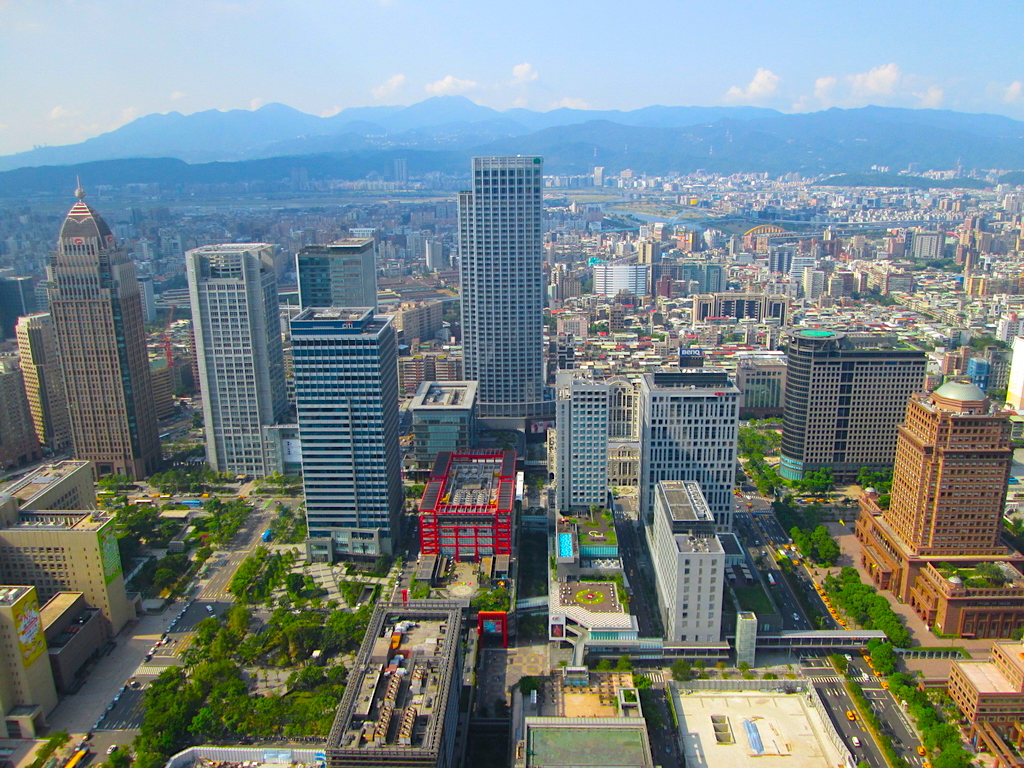
Aerial view of other skyscrapers in Xinyi Special District, Taipei from the Taipei Nan Shan Plaza Observatory.

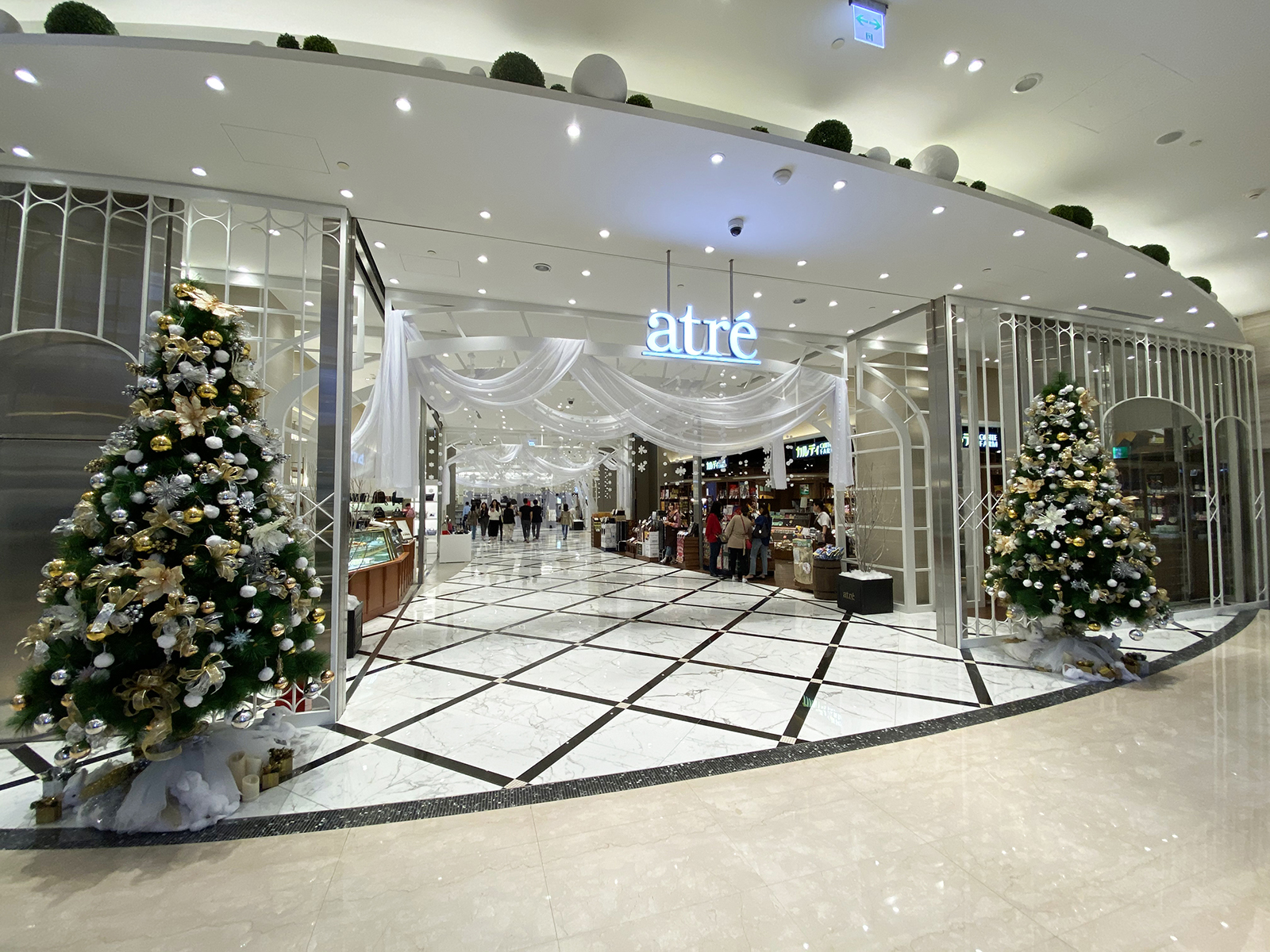
arte department store inside Breeze NAN SHAN

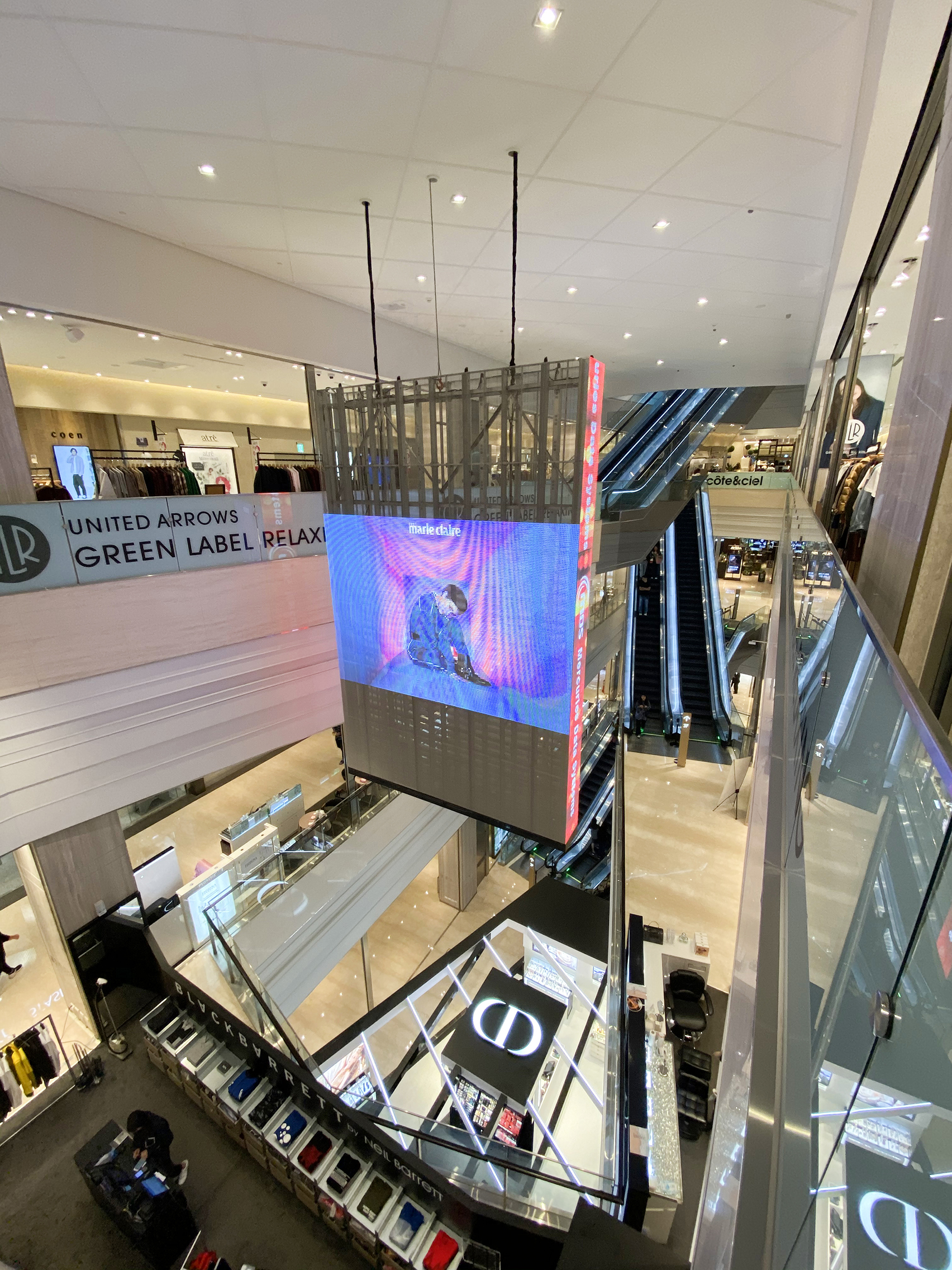
Breeze NAN SHAN Atrium

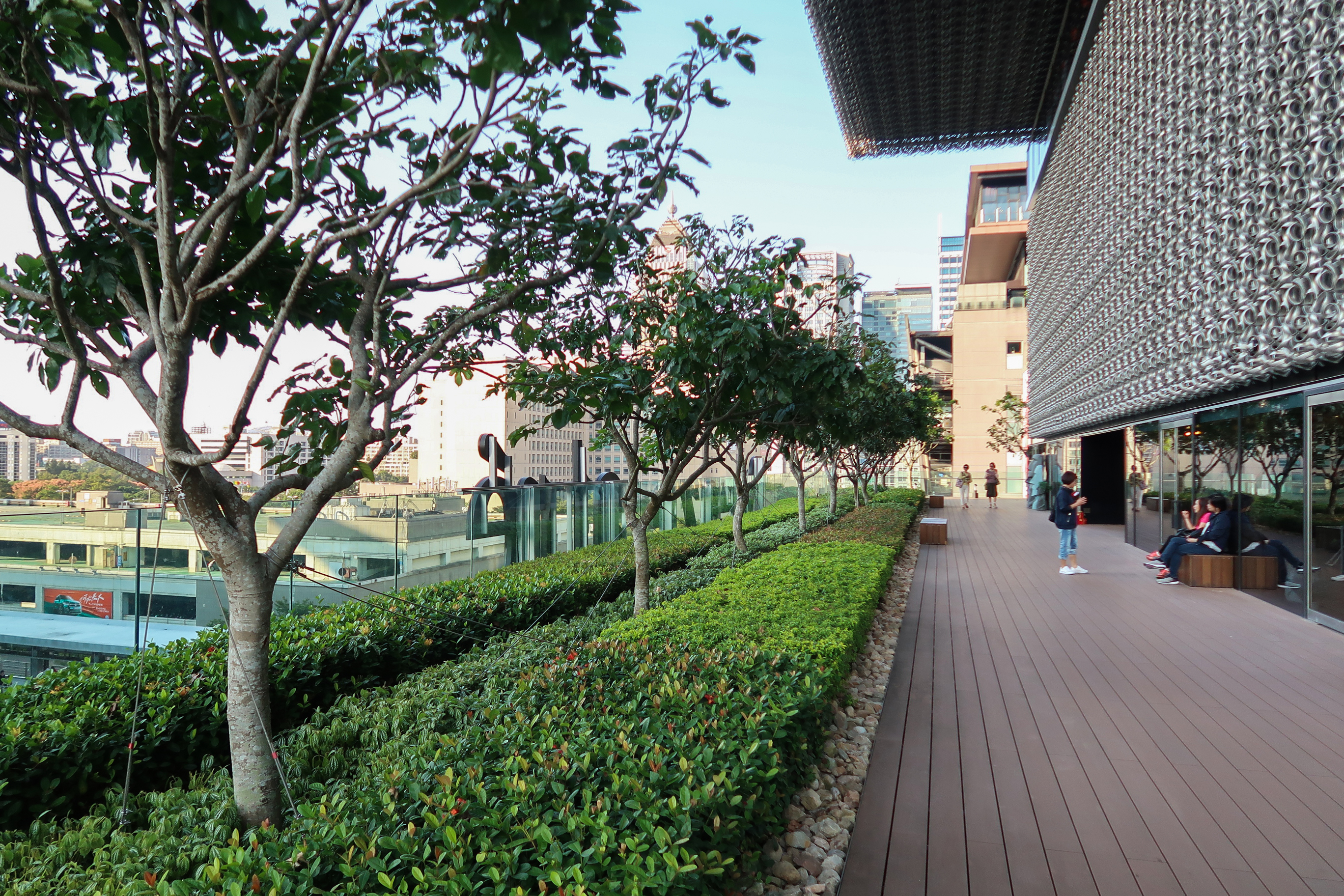
Breeze NAN SHAN Level 4 podium garden

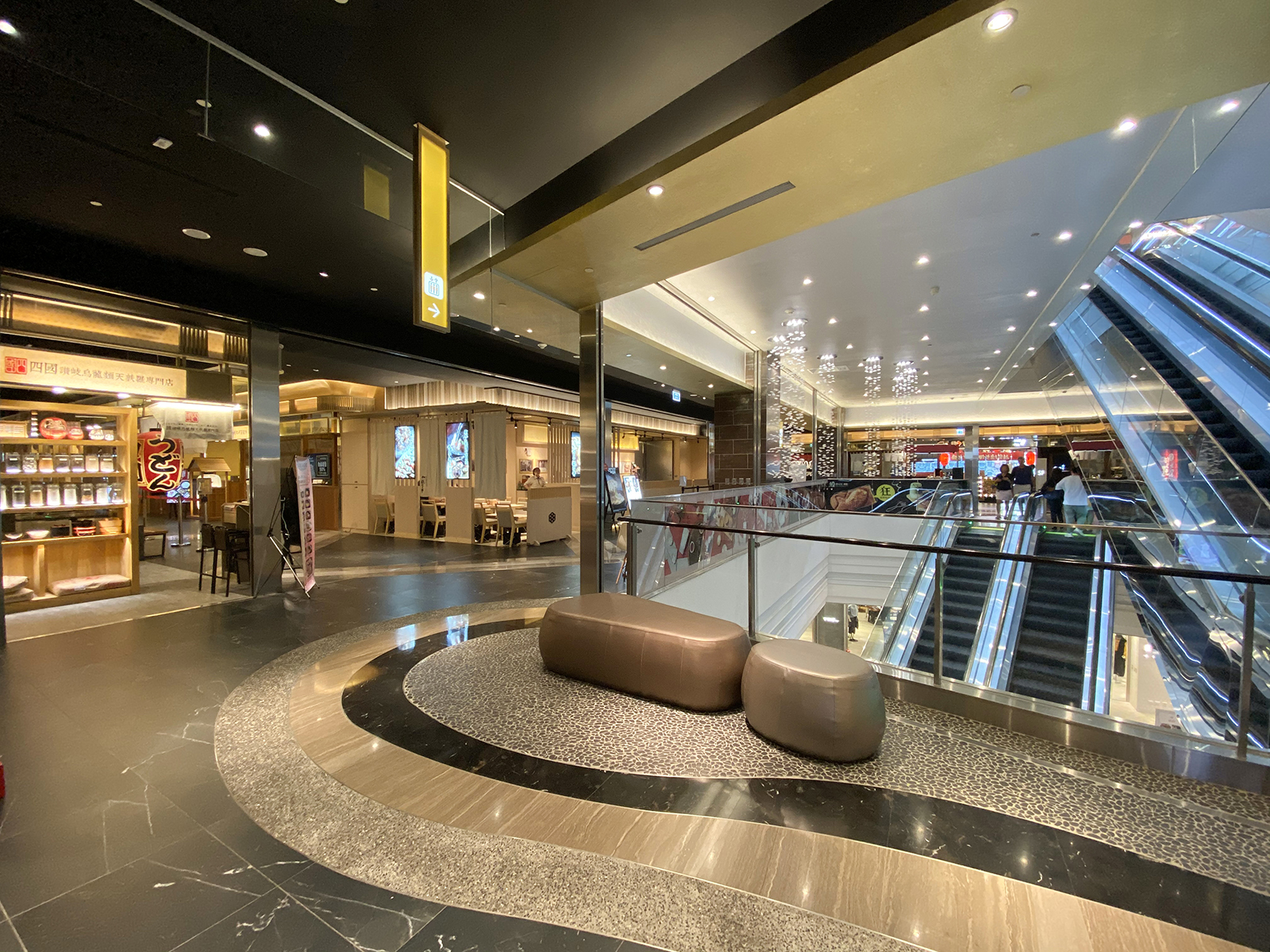
Breeze NAN SHAN Level 5 restaurants

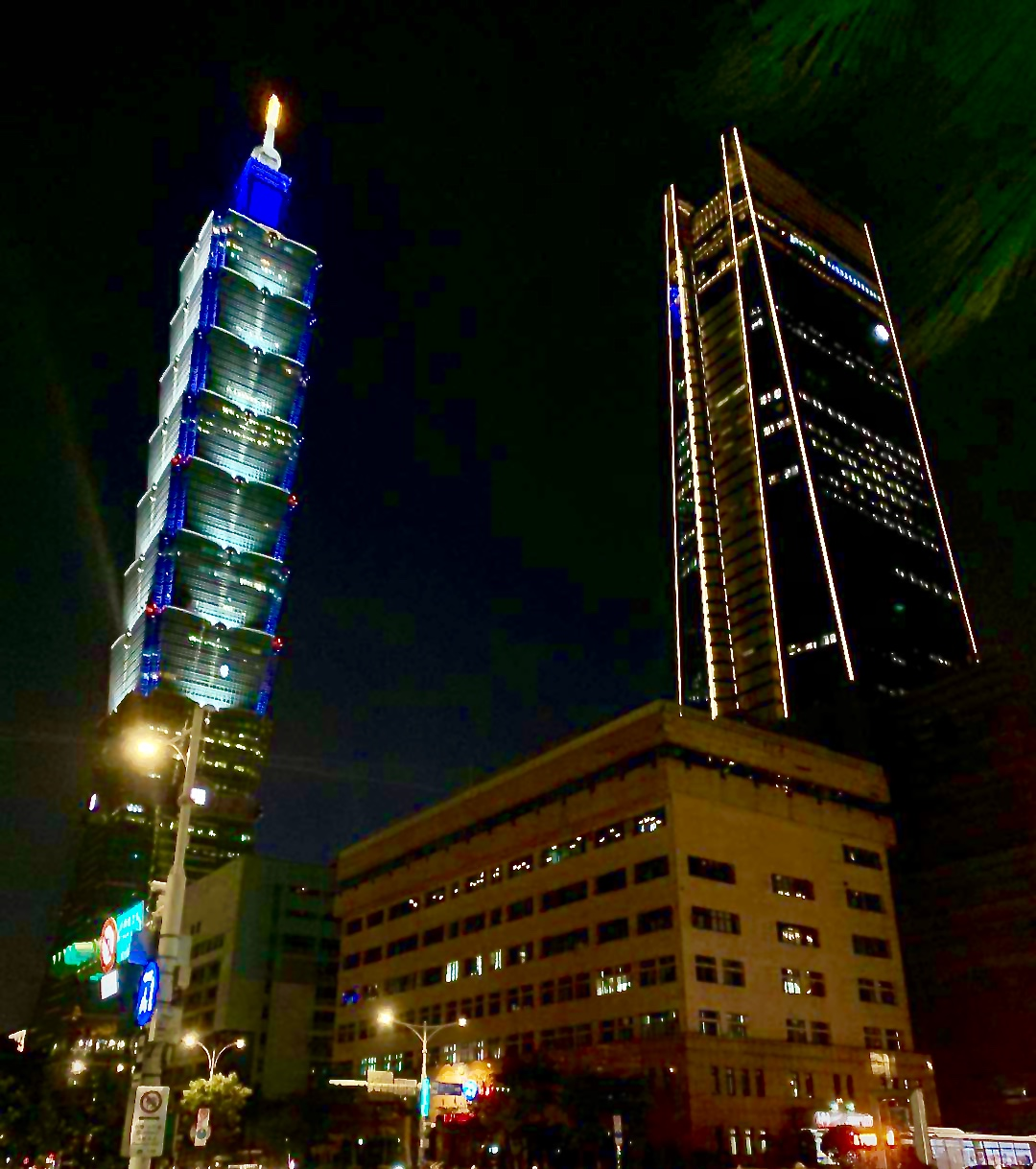
Taipei Nan Shan Plaza and Taipei 101 at night.

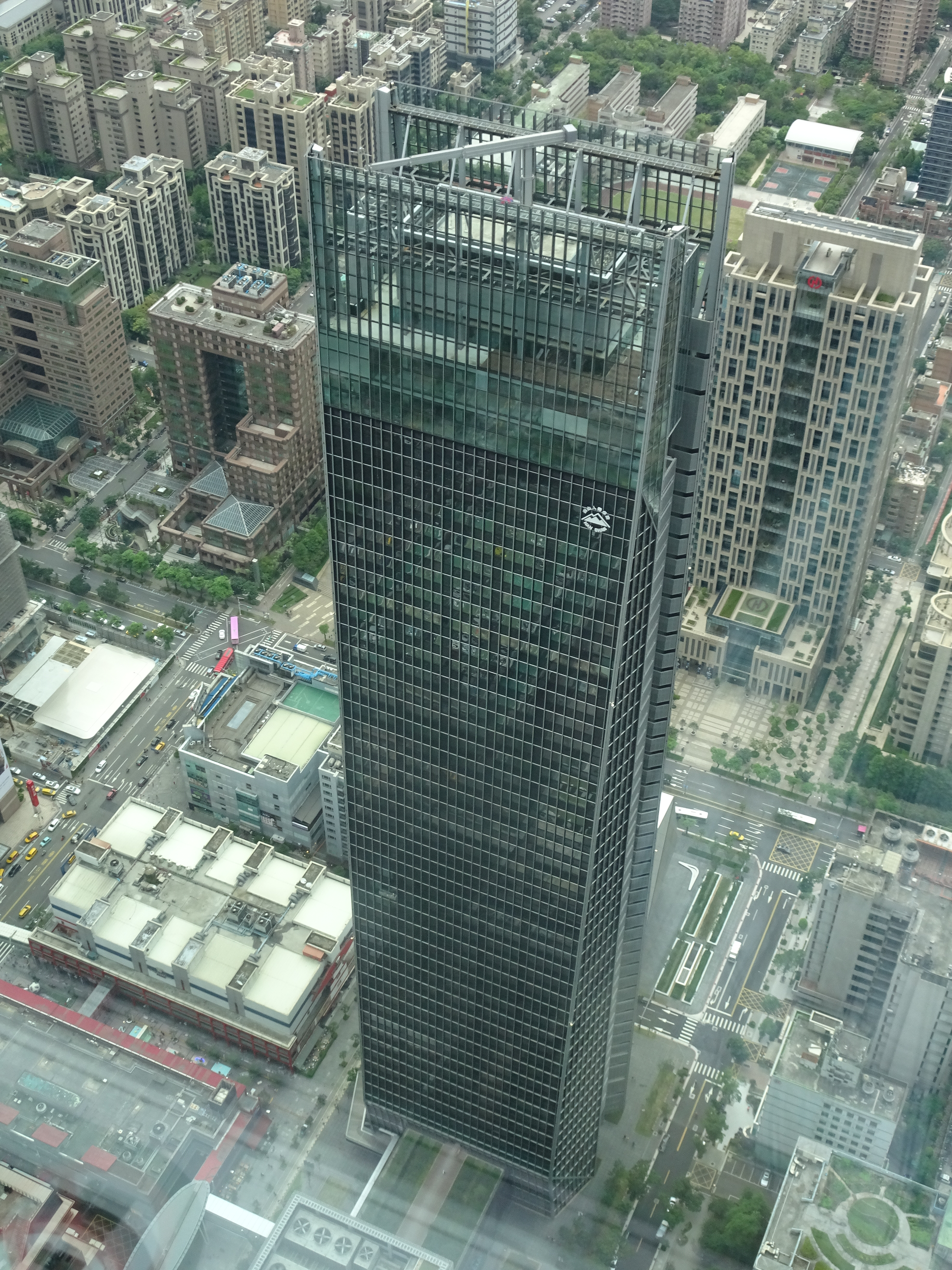
Taipei Nan Shan Plaza - View from top of Taipei 101 Tower

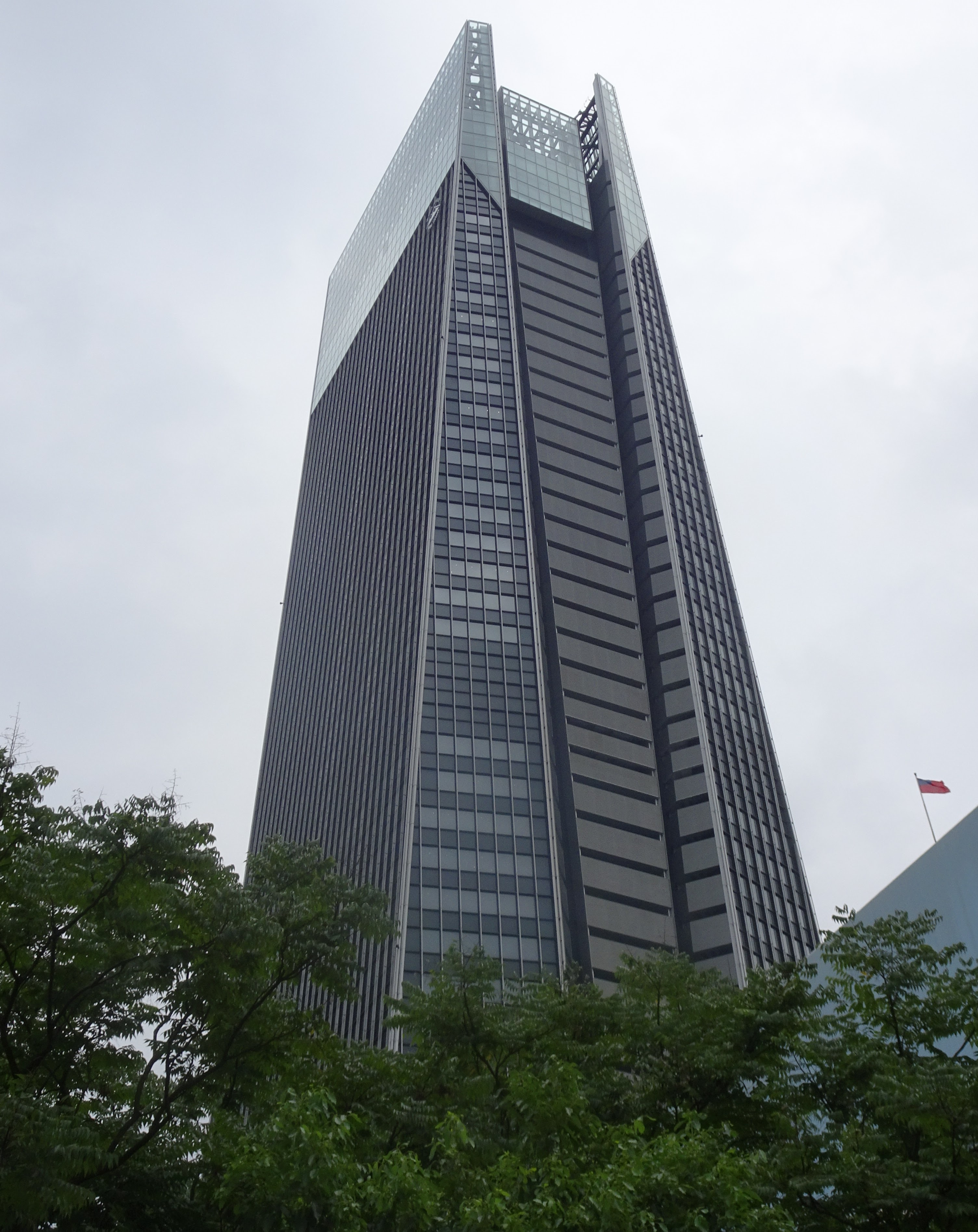
Taipei Nan Shan Plaza seen from ground View

== See also ==
- Shin Kong Life Tower
- Taipei 101
- Gate of Taipei
- Taipei Century Plaza
- List of tallest buildings in Taiwan
- List of tallest buildings in Taipei
