= ATT e Life =

Shopping mall in Zhongshan, Taipei, Taiwan

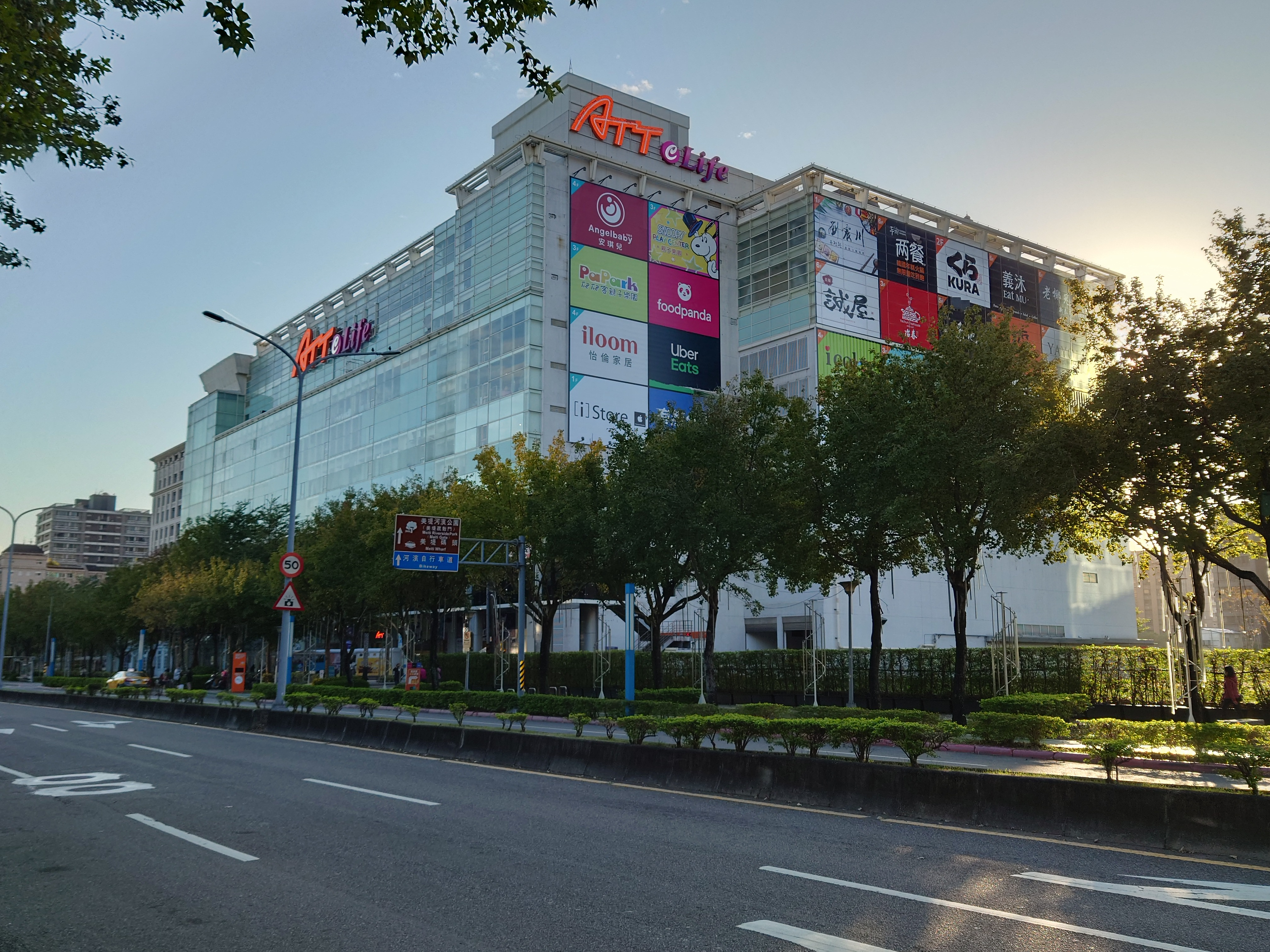
- Location: No. 123, Jingye 3rd Road, Zhongshan District, Taipei, Taiwan
- Coordinates: 25.081376099632415°N 121.55604365470413°E
- Opened: 23 December 2018
- Closed: 7 May 2023
- Floors: 8 floors above ground 1 floors below ground
- Public transit: Jiannan Road metro station
- Website: http://www.attelife.com.tw/

Former brand

ATT e Life, formerly ATT 4 Recharge, was a shopping mall in Zhongshan District, Taipei, Taiwan that opened on 23 December 2018. The name "ATT" stands for "attractive". Using the homonym of "FOR", the letters are changed to the number "4", which represents the four major industries of fashion, cultural creation, entertainment, and food. "Recharge" combines fashion shopping with eating, drinking, playing, and fun, bringing all-round joy to a better life. The building in which the mall is located originally houses A.mart.

At the beginning of 2017, ATT took over the original store building subordinate to Hongtai Group. The theme of the shopping mall was based on the four elements of life, fashion, food, and family. The main types of stores include catering, outdoor leisure stores and family/home life. Trial operations of the mall commenced on 15 December 2018, and it officially opened on 23 December 2018. The mall changed its name to ATT e Life on 20 July 2021. On 20 February 2023, ATT e Life announced that they would close the building on 7 May of the same year due to the COVID-19 pandemic.

== Transportation ==
The mall is situated in close proximity to the Miramar Entertainment Park and can be accessed via the Jiannan Road metro station on the Wenhu line of Taipei Metro.

== Gallery ==
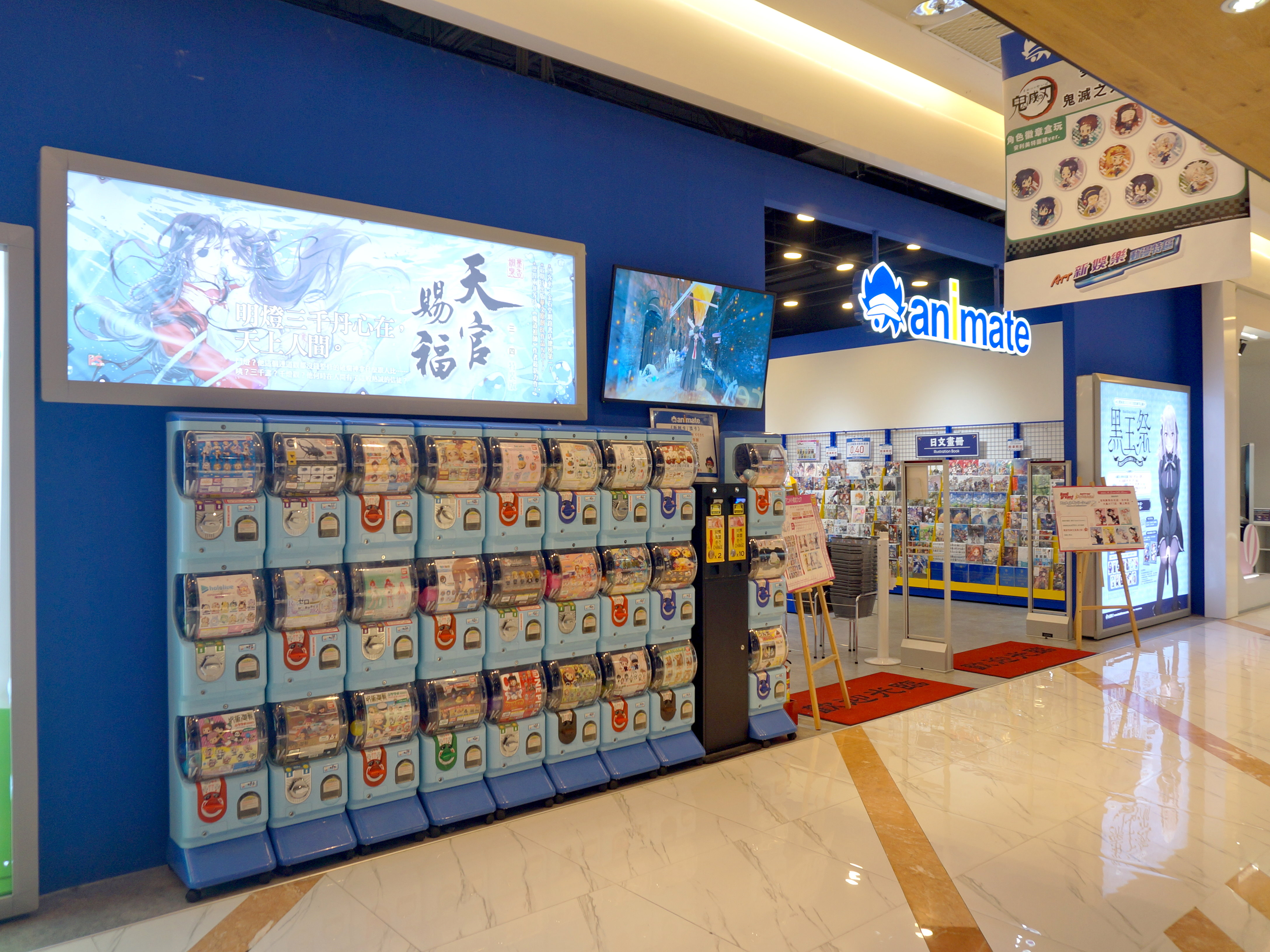
Animate Store

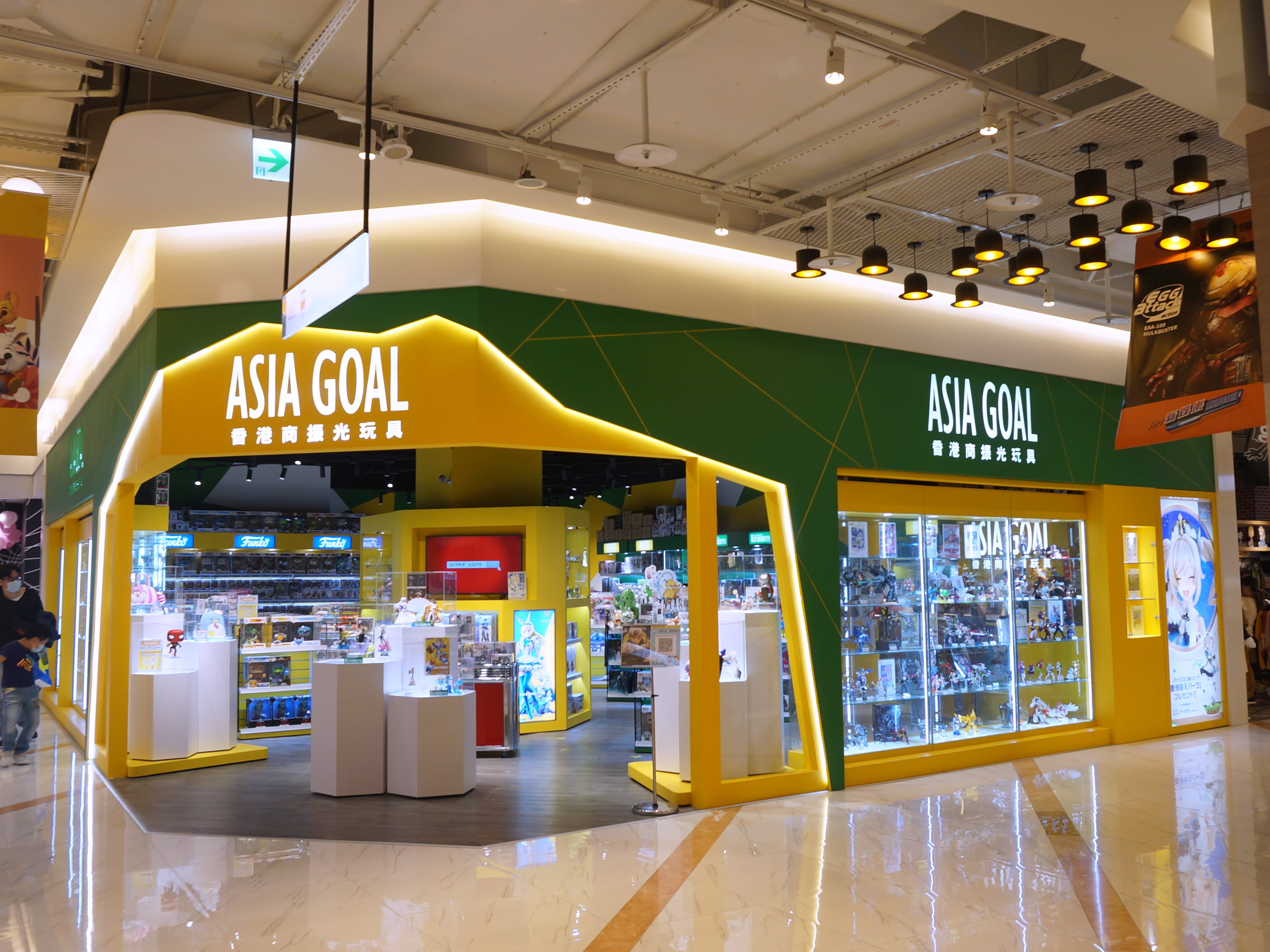
Asia Goal

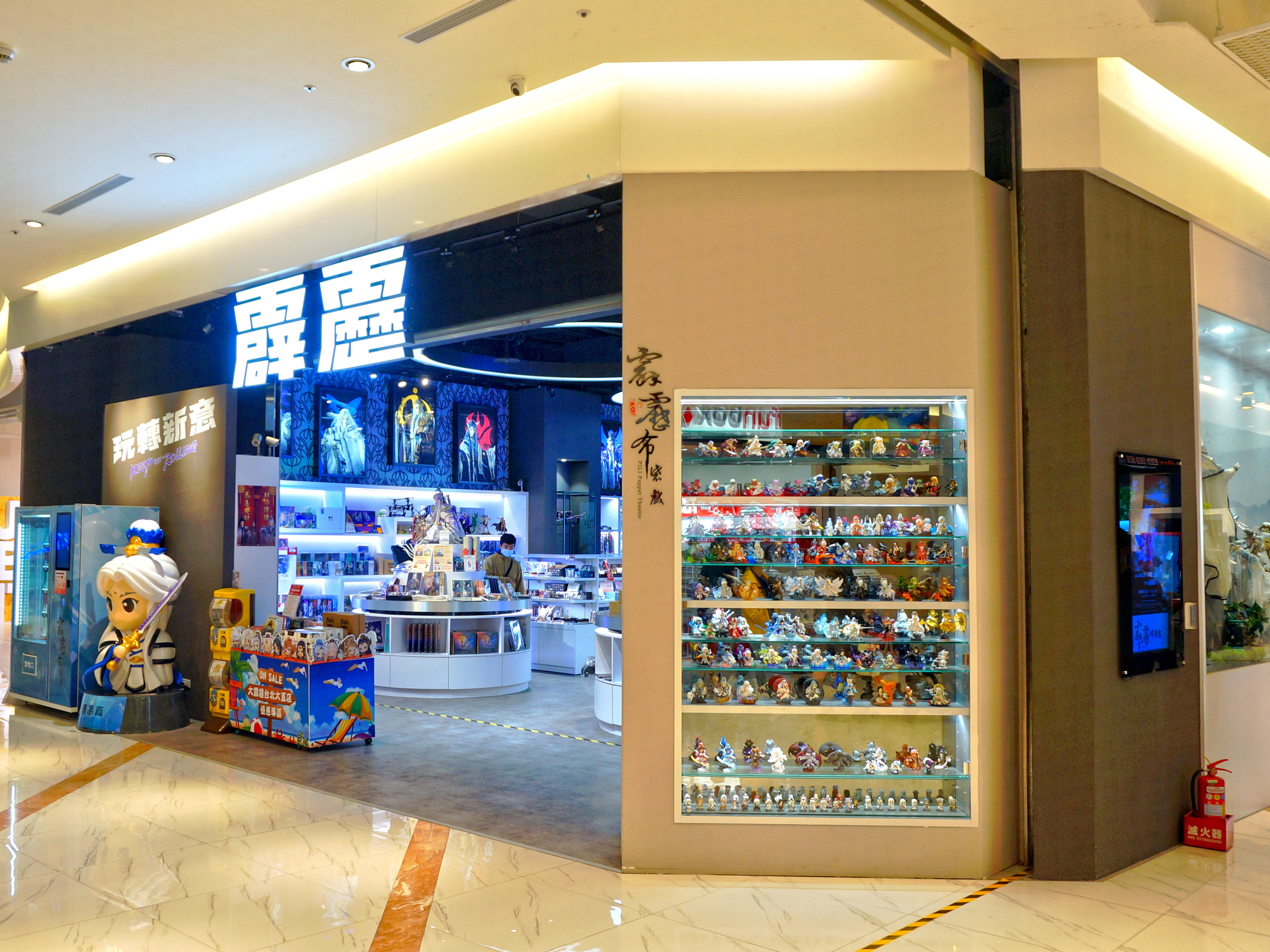
Pili Store

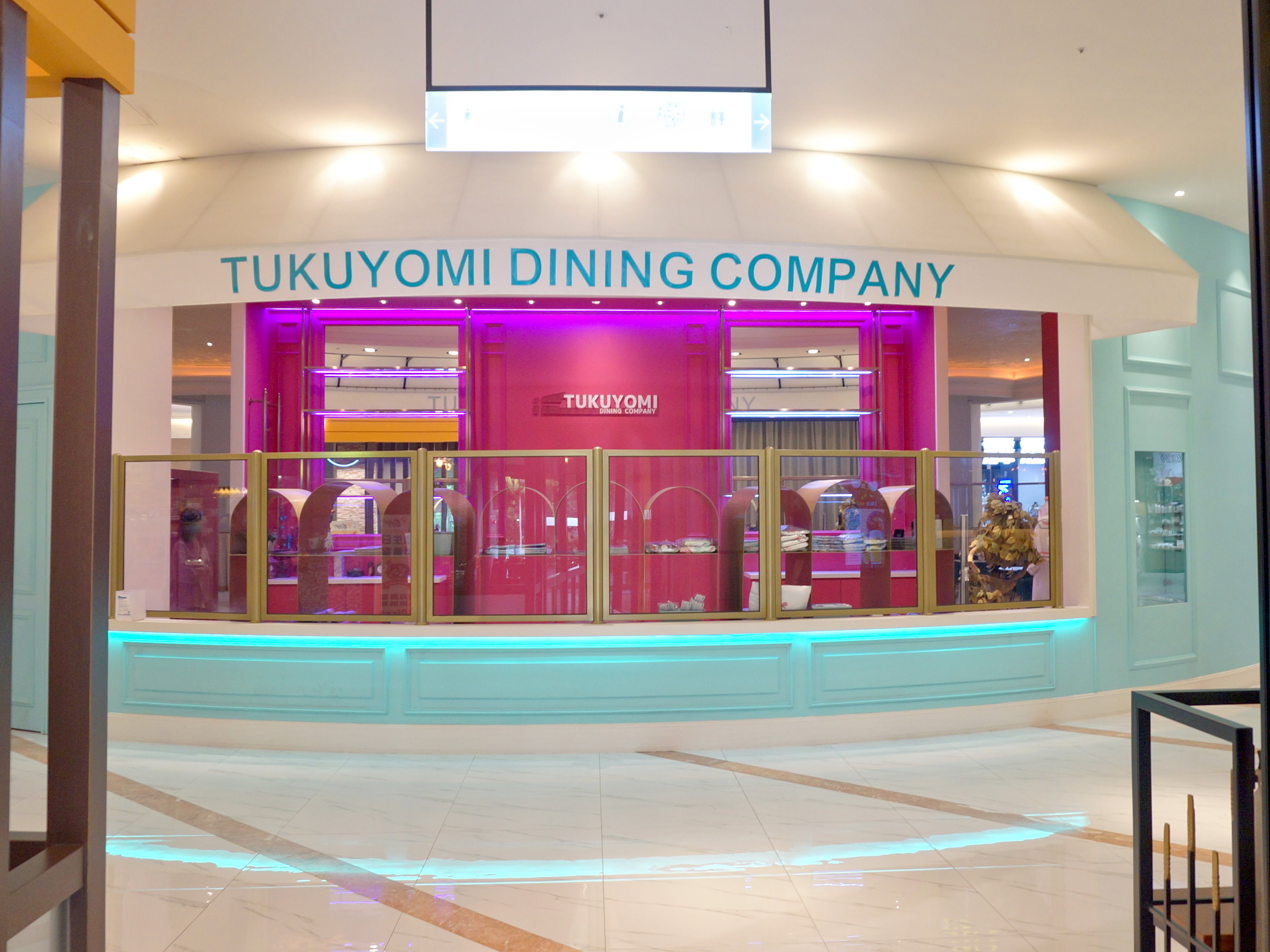
Tukuyomi Maid Café

== See also ==
- List of tourist attractions in Taiwan
- List of shopping malls in Taipei
- ATT 4 FUN
- Miramar Entertainment Park
