= Grand Mayfull Hotel Taipei =

Hotel in Zhongshan, Taipei, Taiwan

Grand Mayfull Hotel Taipei 美福大飯店
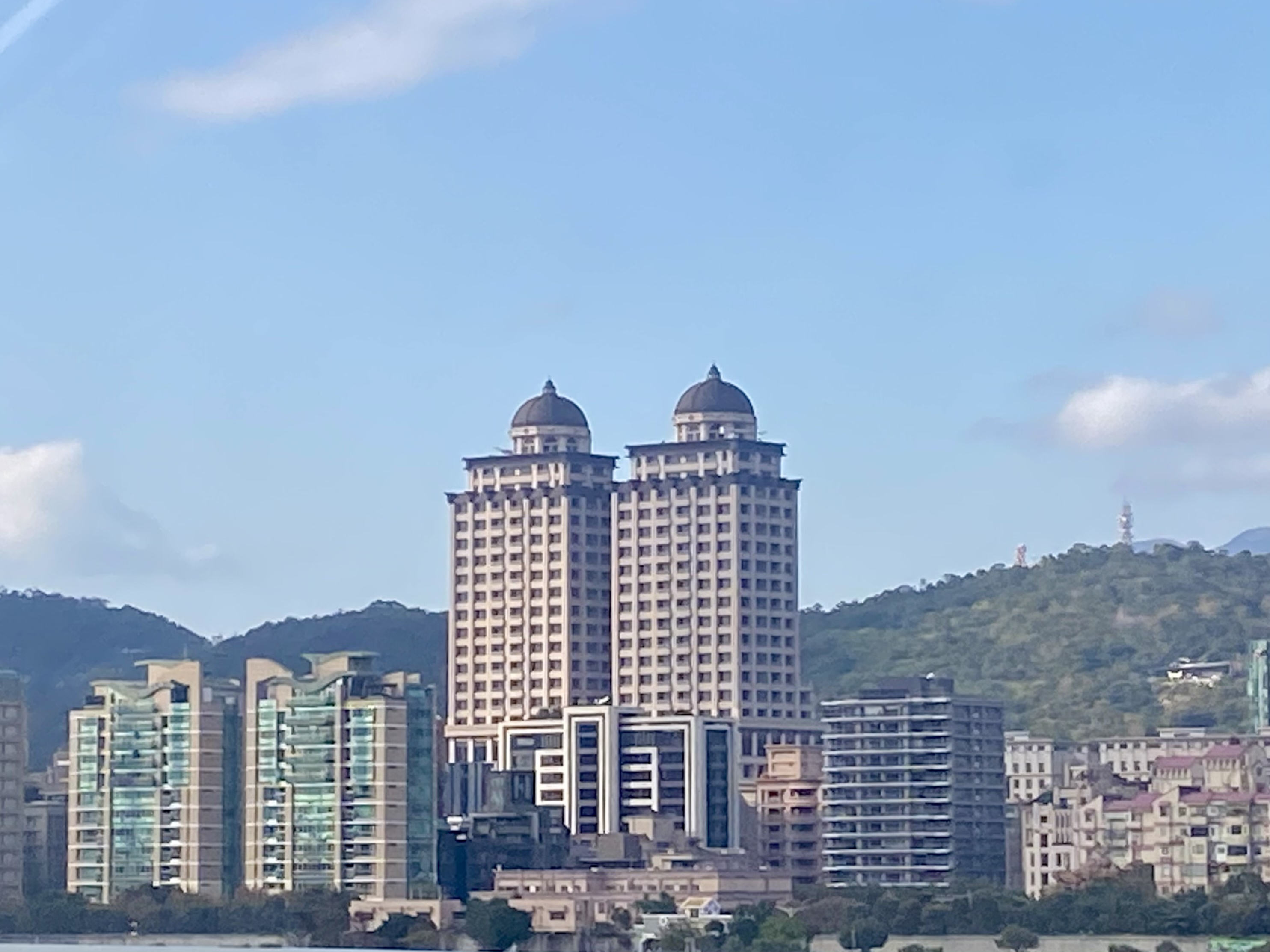
- The two tallest buildings in the image
- Interactive map of Grand Mayfull Hotel Taipei 美福大飯店

General information
- Type: Hotel
- Location: No.55, Lequn 2nd Road, Zhongshan District, Taipei, Taiwan
- Completed: 2015

Height
- Architectural: 143 m (469 ft)

Technical details
- Floor count: 25

The Grand Mayfull Hotel Taipei (Chinese: 美福大飯店) is skyscraper hotel completed in 2015 in Zhongshan District, Taipei, Taiwan. The architectural height of the building is 143 m (469 ft) and it comprises 25 floors above ground and five basement levels.

== The Hotel ==
The hotel has a total of 146 rooms including 20 premium suites, 5 themed restaurants, one café and a bar. It also offers a grand ballroom with a 7-meter high ceiling and a heated outdoor swimming pool with sauna overlooking the Taipei 101. The hotel was classified as one of Taiwan's leading hotels by the World Travel Awards in 2017 and was dubbed by the Michelin Guide as one of the top three luxury hotels in Taipei in both 2018 and 2019.

=== Restaurants & Bars ===
- Palette: Buffet offering cuisines from around the globe.
- CHIU YUET FONG: Cantonese restaurant featuring traditional Cantonese & Teochew cuisines, as well as Dim Sum.
- MIPON: Restaurant offering Taiwanese cuisine that has received commendations from the Michelin Guide in 2018 and 2019.
- HARUYAMA: Japanese restaurant
- GMT Italian Restaurant
- Cocoon Poolside Bar: A poolside bar with a view of the Taipei skyline
- Moment café & bakery: Offers freshly baked breads and beverages

== See also ==
- Mandarin Oriental, Taipei
- Regent Taipei
