= Miramar Entertainment Park =

Shopping mall in Zhongshan, Taipei, Taiwan

Miramar Entertainment Park 美麗華百樂園

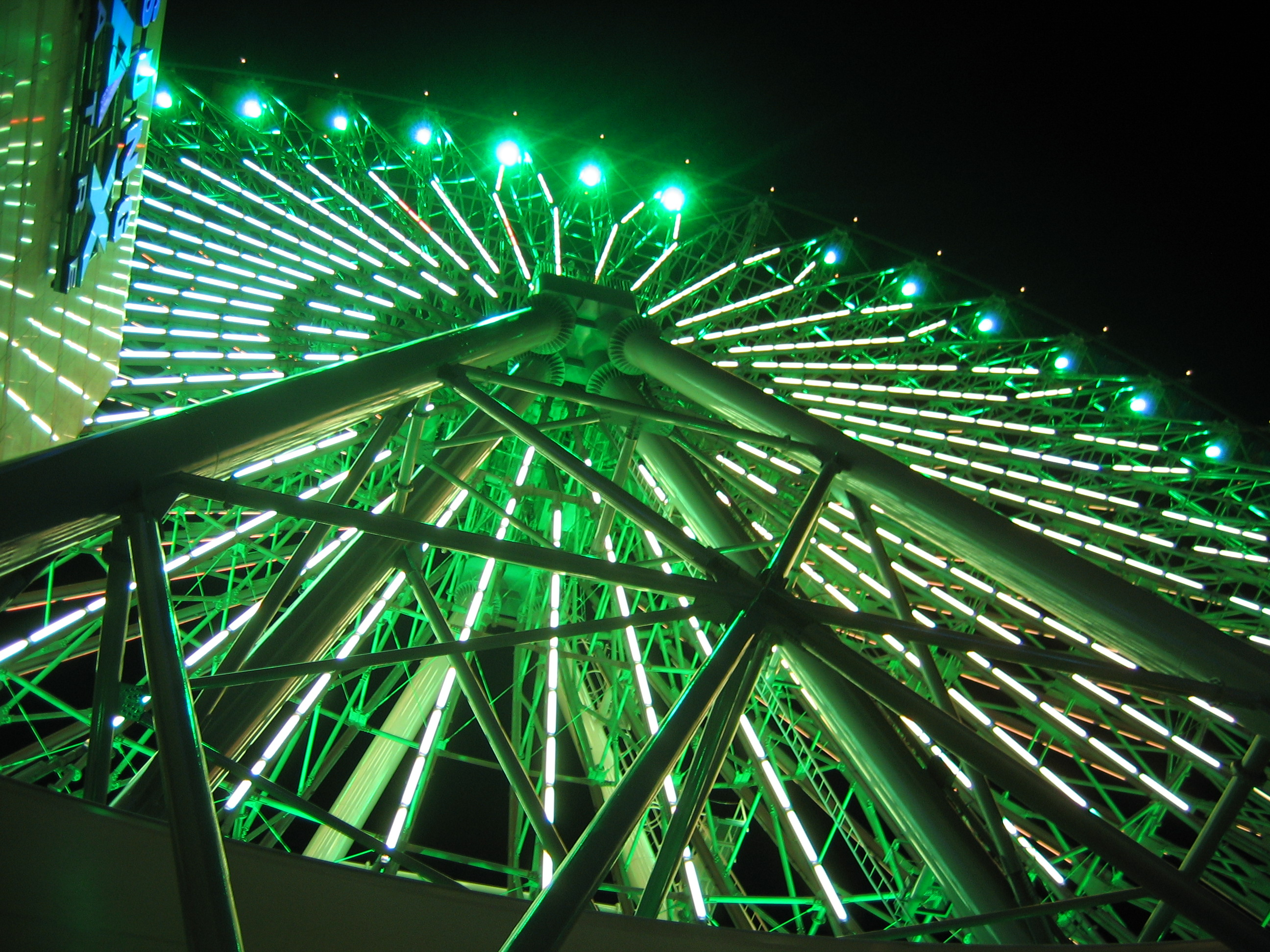
- The rooftop Ferris wheel
- Location: Taipei, Taiwan
- Coordinates: 25.08282°N 121.557541°E
- Opened: 19 November 2004
- Developer: Miramar City Development Holdings Ltd.
- Manager: Miramar City Development Holdings Ltd.
- Owner: Miramar City Development Holdings Ltd.
- Floor area: 82,645 m^{2} (889,580 sq ft)
- Floors: 6
- Parking: 1255
- Website: www.miramar.com.tw/miramar (in Chinese)

Miramar Entertainment Park (Chinese: 美麗華百樂園; pinyin: Měilìhuá Bǎilèyuán) is a shopping mall located in the Dazhi area in Zhongshan District of Taipei, Taiwan.

The shopping mall contains an IMAX theater. With 28m × 21m dimensions, its movie screen is the largest in Asia for screening commercial films.

== Ferris wheel ==
On the roof of Miramar Entertainment Park is a 70 meters (230 ft) tall ferris wheel, third tallest in Taiwan after the 88 meters (289 ft) Sky Wheel at Janfusun Fancyworld and Sky Dream in Lihpao Land. The building and wheel combined have a total overall height of 100 meters (330 ft), making it previously the highest overall in Taiwan, but now superseded by the Dream Mall ferris wheel (Kaohsiung Eye) in Kaohsiung, a smaller 50 meters (160 ft) diameter wheel on a taller building which opened in May 2007.

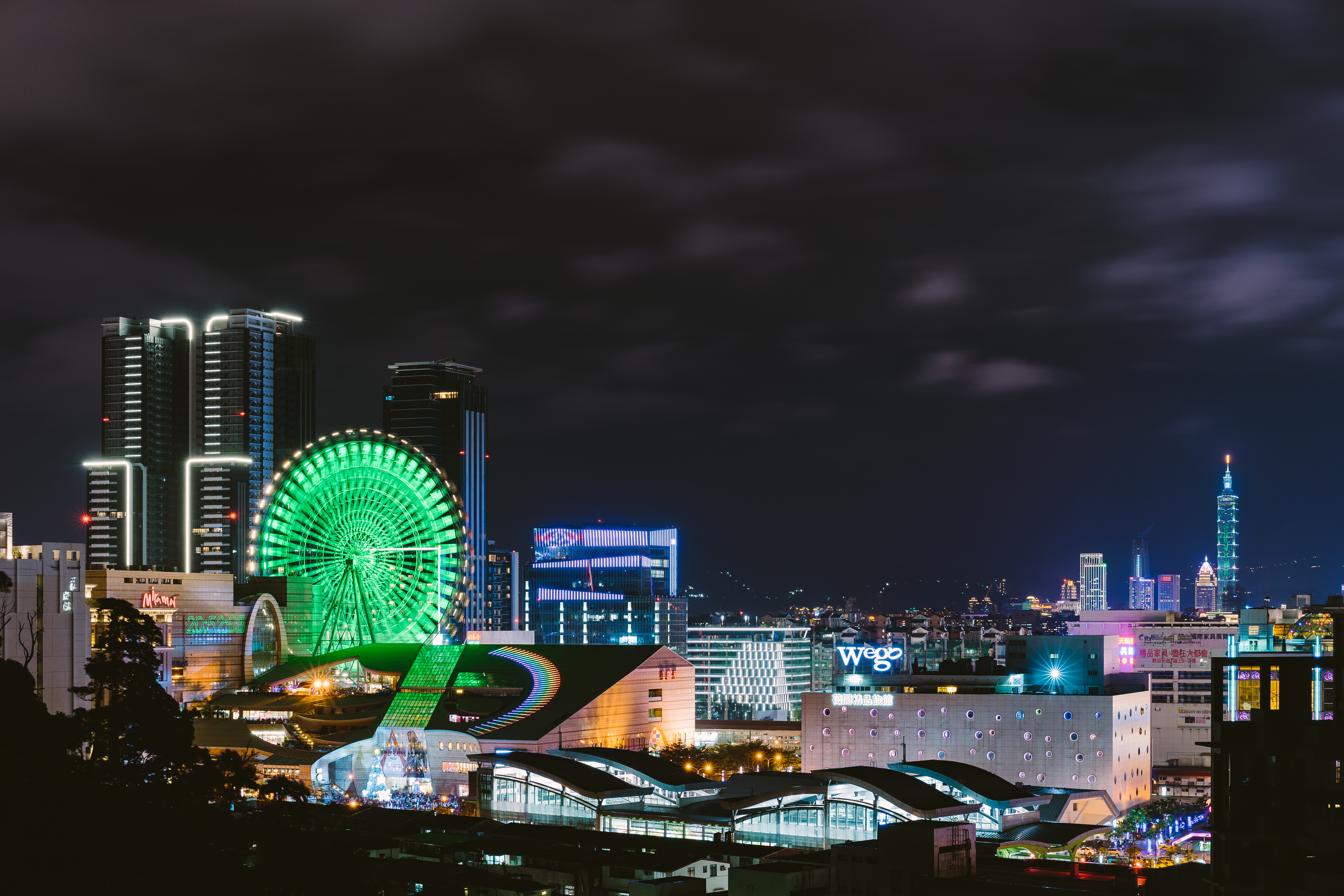
Skyline of Taipei from Miramar Entertainment Park

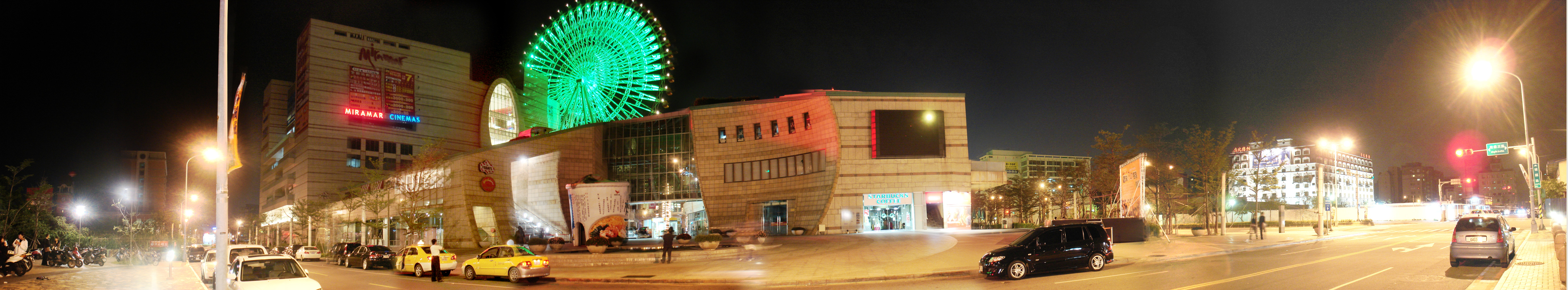
Full panoramic view of Miramar Entertainment Park

== Transportation ==
The Wenhu line of the Taipei Metro has a station next to the mall.

== See also ==
- List of tourist attractions in Taiwan
