= Jiannan Road metro station =

Metro station in Taipei, Taiwan

Jiannan Rd. /Y32 劍南路
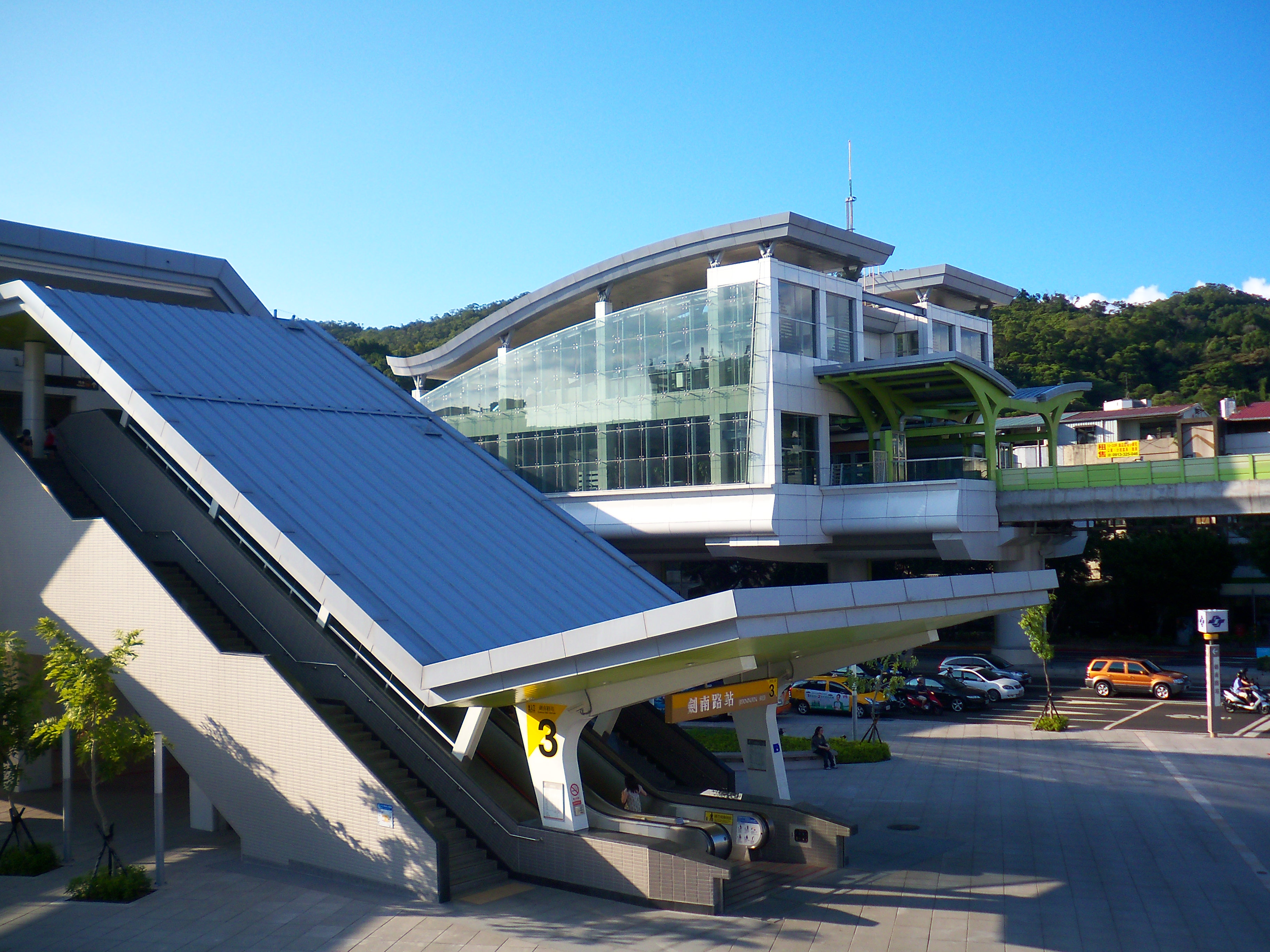
- Jiannan Road station

Chinese name
- Traditional Chinese: 劍南路
- Simplified Chinese: 剑南路
Transcriptions
Standard Mandarin
- Hanyu Pinyin: Jiànnán Lù
- Bopomofo: ㄐㄧㄢˋ ㄋㄢˊ ㄌㄨˋ
Hakka
- Pha̍k-fa-sṳ: Kiam-nàm-lu
Southern Min
- Tâi-lô: Kiàm-lâm-lōo

General information
- Other names: Miramar; 美麗華
- Location: No. 798, Bei'an Rd. Zhongshan, Taipei; Taiwan
- Coordinates: 25.08486°N 121.555567°E
- Operator: Taipei Metro
- Lines: Wenhu line (BR15); Circular line (Y32)
- Connections: Bus stop

Construction
- Structure type: Elevated

Other information
- Station code: / Y32

History
- Opened: 4 July 2009

Passengers
- daily (December 2024) (Ranked of 119)
- Rank: 68 out of 109

Services
Preceding station	Taipei Metro	Following station
Dazhi towards Taipei Zoo	Wenhu line	Xihu towards Nangang Exhib Center
Future services
Preceding station	New Taipei Metro	Following station
National Palace Museum towards Taipei Zoo	Circular line after Phase 2	Terminus
Location

The Taipei Metro Jiannan Road station is located in the Zhongshan District in Taipei, Taiwan. It is a station on Wenhu line and a future transfer station to the Circular line as part of the second phase.

== Station overview ==
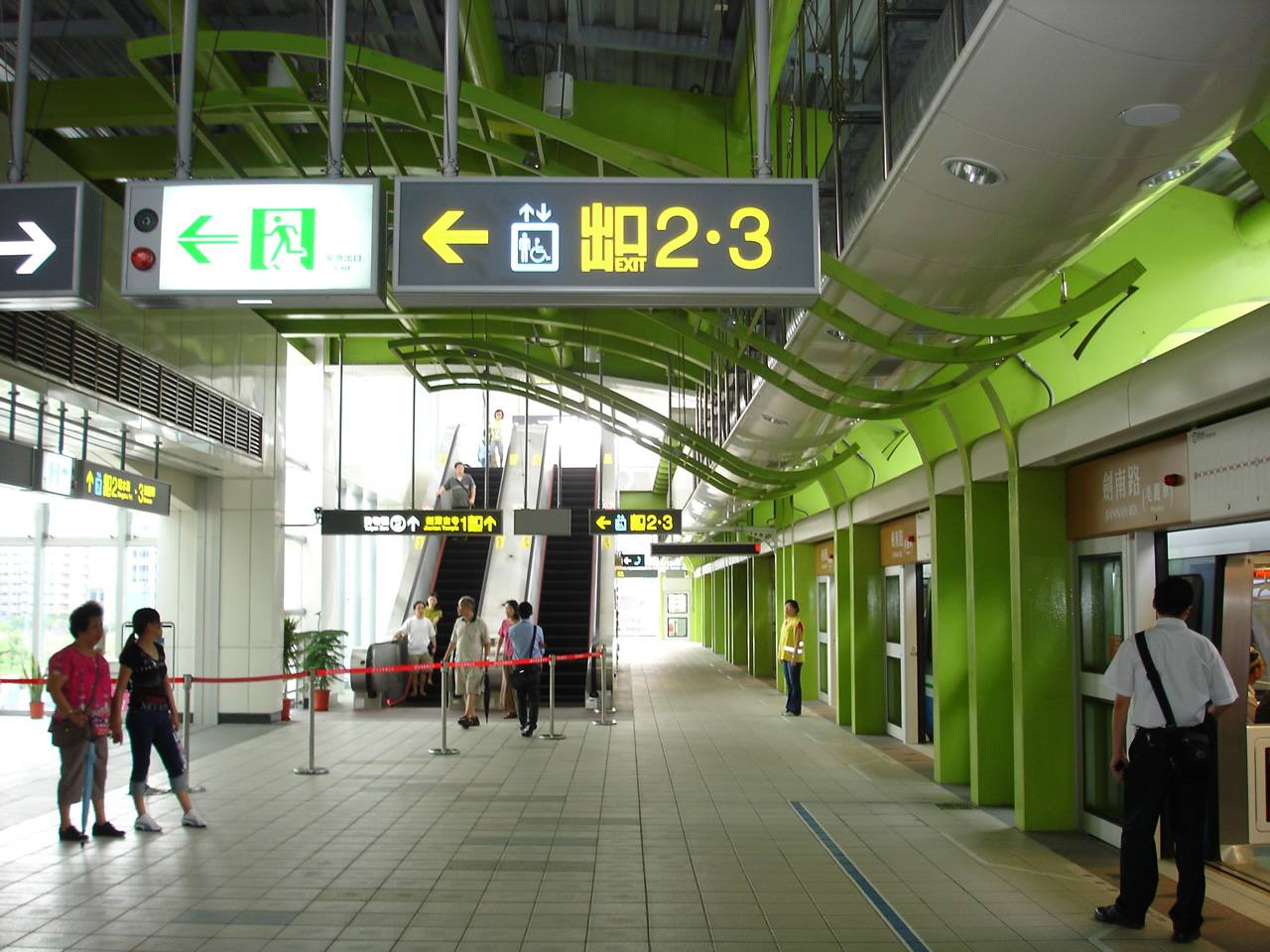
Jiannan Road station platform 1

This three-level, elevated station is equipped with two side platforms, three exits, and a platform elevator located on the north side of the concourse level. It is 83 meters in length and 24 meters in width.

Public art at the station is titled "The Sky of Frog", situated on the ceiling of the station at ground level. At a cost of NT$6,000,000, the piece depicts three sets of landscapes: flowing water, mountains, and a pond scene, each depicted from both a man and a frog's perspective.

== History ==
- April 2003: Construction begins on the station.
- 22 February 2009: Jiannan Road station construction is completed.
- 4 July 2009: Begins service with the opening of the Brown line. Celebrations for the opening of the new line are held at this station.
- June 2031: The station is scheduled to become a transfer station with the Circular line.

== Station layout ==
4F	Connecting level	Overpass for platform connection
3F
3F	Concourse （to Platform 1）
3F	Concourse （to Platform 1）	Lobby, information desk, automatic ticket dispensing machines One-way faregates, restrooms
3F	Side platform, doors will open on the right
3F	Platform 1	← Wenhu line toward Taipei Nangang Exhibition Center (BR16 Xihu)
3F	Platform 2	→ Wenhu line toward Taipei Zoo (BR14 Dazhi) →
3F	Side platform, doors will open on the right

1F	Street level	Entrance/exit

== Nearby places ==
- Miramar Entertainment Park
- Jiantan Temple
- Military History and Translation Office, MND
