= Hutou Mountain Park =

Park in Taoyuan City, Taiwan

- 虎頭山公園
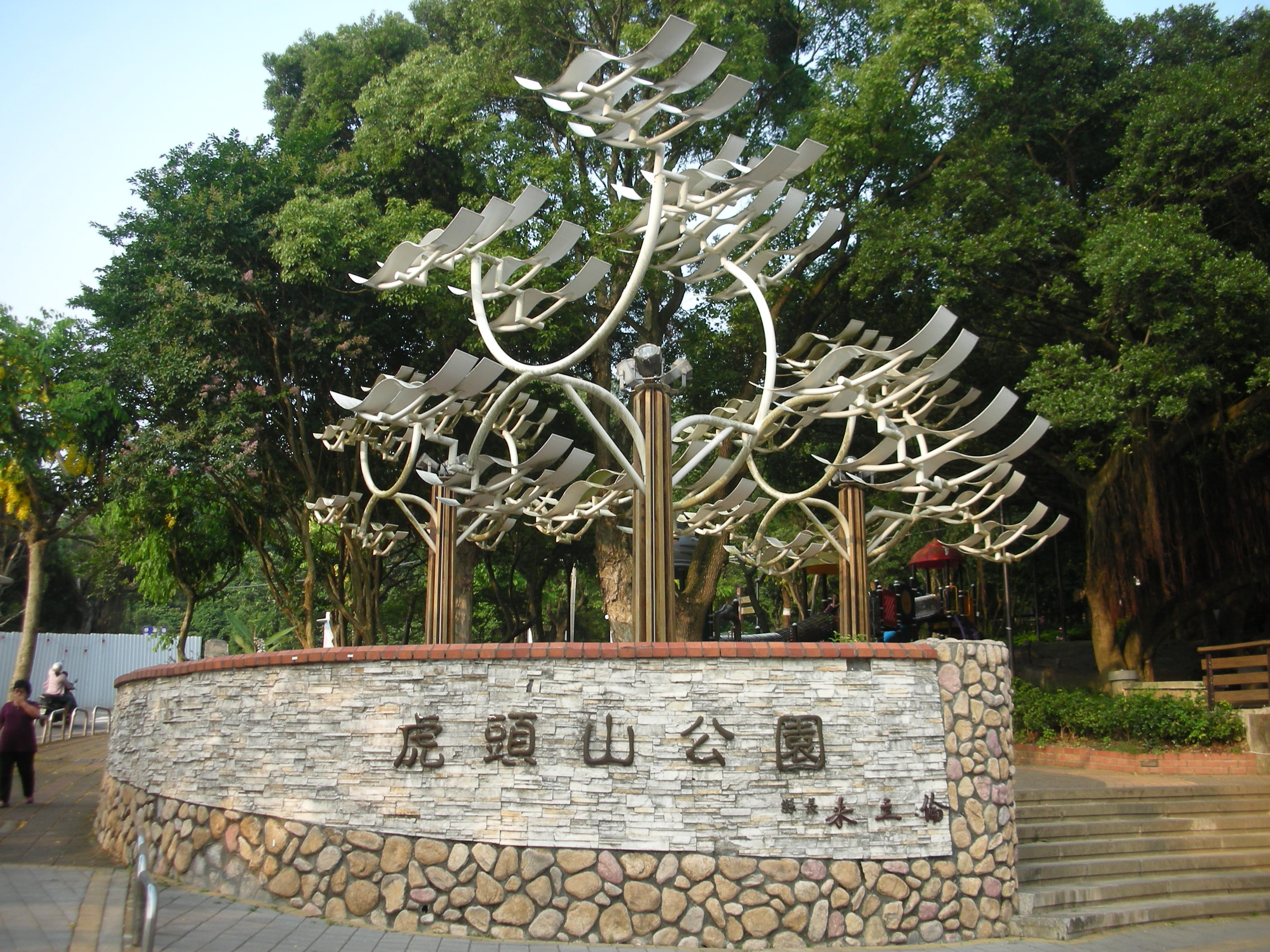
- Interactive map of Hutou Mountain Park
- Type: Urban park
- Location: Guishan District and Taoyuan District of Taoyuan City, Taiwan
- Coordinates: 25°00′06.1″N 121°19′49.2″E
- Elevation: 251 meters
- Etymology: Mountain shape resembling a tiger's head
- Administrator: Taoyuan City Government
- Hiking trails: Seven hiking trails
- Water: Lotus pond
- Plants: Cherry trees, plum trees, bamboo, tung trees
- Public transit: Taoyuan Station
- Facilities: Playgrounds, barbecue areas, pavilions

Hutou Mountain Park (traditional Chinese: 虎頭山公園; simplified Chinese: 虎头山公园; pinyin: Hǔtóushān Gōngyuán), also known as Hutoushan Park, is an urban park in Guishan District and Taoyuan District of Taoyuan City, Taiwan. Situated near downtown Taoyuan at an elevation of 251 metres (823 ft), the park serves as a popular recreational area for local residents and is often called the "backyard of Taoyuan".

== Name and geography ==
The name Hutou (虎頭) means "tiger head" in Chinese. The mountain range is so named because its shape resembles a crouching tiger. At 251 metres (823 ft) above sea level, Hutou Mountain is the highest point in Taoyuan's urban area and offers panoramic views of the Taoyuan Tableland and the city below.

The park spans parts of both Guishan District and Taoyuan District. The terrain includes forested hillsides, ponds, and various themed gardens connected by hiking trails.

== Features ==
=== Hiking trails ===
The park contains seven interconnected hiking trails: the Scenic Health Trail, Forest Experience Trail, Sun Pavilion Trail, Cherry Blossom Trail, Plum Garden Trail, Ecological Interpretation Trail, and Martyrs' Shrine Trail. The trails are lined with pavilions and rest areas built in traditional Chinese architectural style, many offering views of the surrounding cityscape.

=== Owl Forest School ===
The Owl Forest School (Chinese: 奧爾森林學堂; pinyin: Ào'ěr Sēnlín Xuétáng) is a children's recreation area opened in 2012 by the Taoyuan City Government. The facility features wooden skywalks connecting three tree houses built among ficus trees, designed to minimize disturbance to the natural landscape. The name derives from the owls that inhabit the forest during winter months. The area includes children's playgrounds and serves as a popular destination for families.

=== Jingguo Plum Garden ===
Jingguo Plum Garden (Chinese: 經國梅園; pinyin: Jīngguó Méiyuán) was established by Taoyuan County Government following the death of President Chiang Ching-kuo in 1988. The garden features over 40 species of bamboo, as well as plum trees, cherry trees, and tung trees. The white-walled, blue-tiled entrance gate is built in a classical Chinese style. The garden is known for plum blossoms in late winter and tung tree flowers (known locally as "May snow") in April and May.

=== Temples and shrines ===
Sansheng Temple (Chinese: 三聖宮; pinyin: Sānshèng Gōng) is dedicated to the three heroes of the Oath of the Peach Garden from the classical novel Romance of the Three Kingdoms: Liu Bei, Guan Yu, and Zhang Fei. The temple commemorates the legendary oath of brotherhood that took place in a peach garden—fitting for Taoyuan, whose name means "peach garden".

The Taoyuan Martyrs' Shrine, located within the park, was originally built in 1938 as the Taoyuan Shinto Shrine (桃園神社) during the Japanese colonial period. The structure was designed in Tang dynasty-inspired architecture and is considered one of the best-preserved Shinto shrines outside Japan. After World War II, the Kuomintang government repurposed it as a martyrs' shrine to honor Chinese war heroes, including statues of Koxinga and tablets commemorating figures such as Liu Yongfu. The shrine was designated as a historic site in 1994.

The Taoyuan Confucius Temple (Chinese: 桃園孔廟; pinyin: Táoyuán Kǒngmiào), constructed in 1989, is situated on the slopes of Hutou Mountain adjacent to the Owl Forest School. It is the newest of Taiwan's thirteen principal Confucius temples and is notable for being the only Confucius temple in Taiwan to contain a statue of Confucius, as other temples follow the Ming Dynasty tradition of using only spirit tablets.

=== Environmental Park ===
The Hutoushan Environmental Park (Chinese: 虎頭山環保公園; pinyin: Hǔtóushān Huánbǎo Gōngyuán), covering approximately 2.5 hectares, was converted from a former landfill into a green park. The park features solar and wind power installations, including a windmill at the entrance, demonstrating eco-friendly engineering methods. The elevated location provides 360-degree panoramic views of Taoyuan, making it a popular destination for viewing the night sky and city lights.

=== Other facilities ===
Additional park amenities include a lotus pond, children's playgrounds, barbecue areas, and an outdoor amphitheater that can accommodate over 200 people for small performances. Cherry blossom trees throughout the park bloom in spring, attracting visitors during the flowering season.

== Transportation ==
The park is located approximately 2.5 kilometres (1.6 mi) northeast of Taoyuan Station on the Taiwan Railway. Taoyuan Bus Company routes 5, 105, 125, and 707A serve the park, with stops at Hutoushan, Sansheng Temple, and the Martyrs' Shrine.

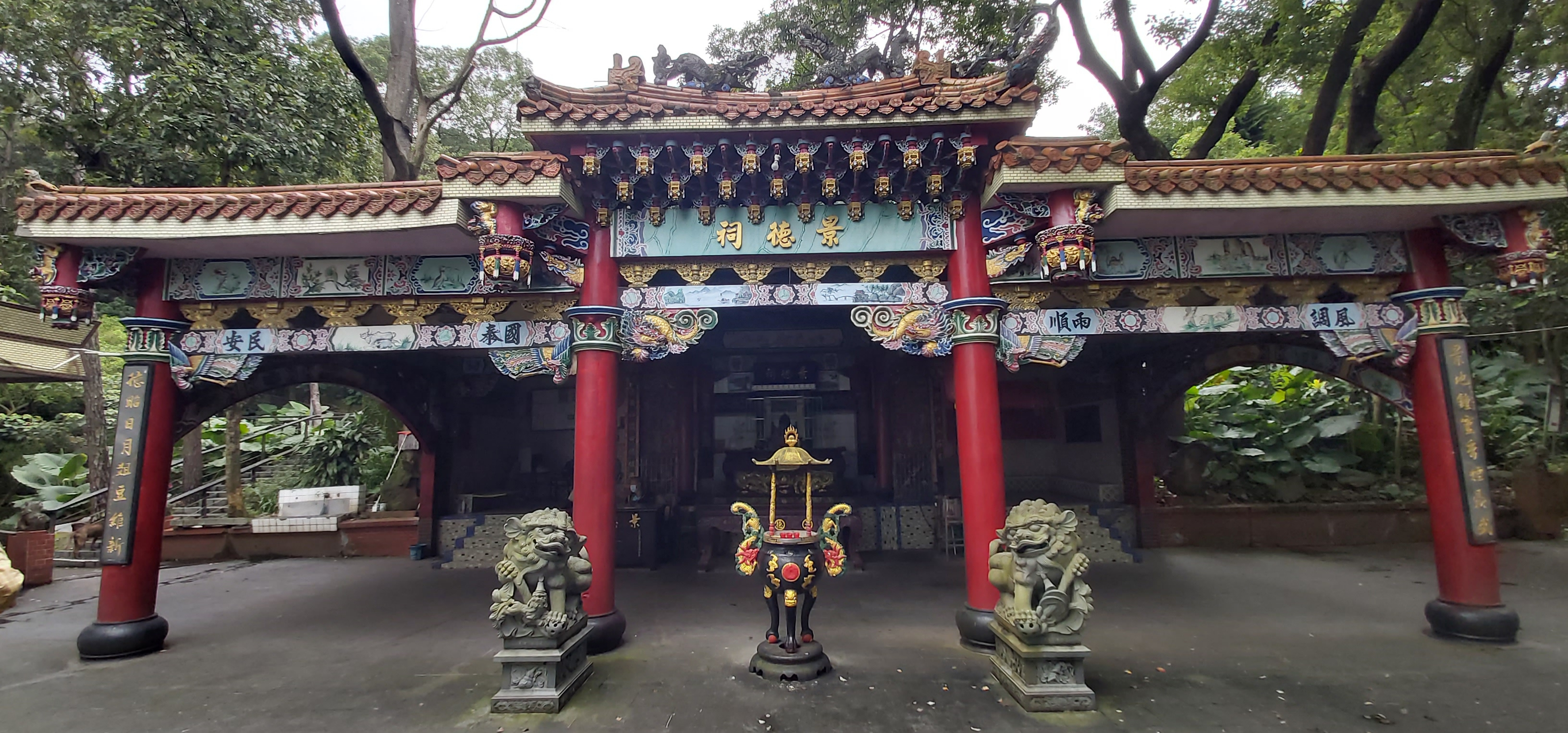
Jingde Shrine

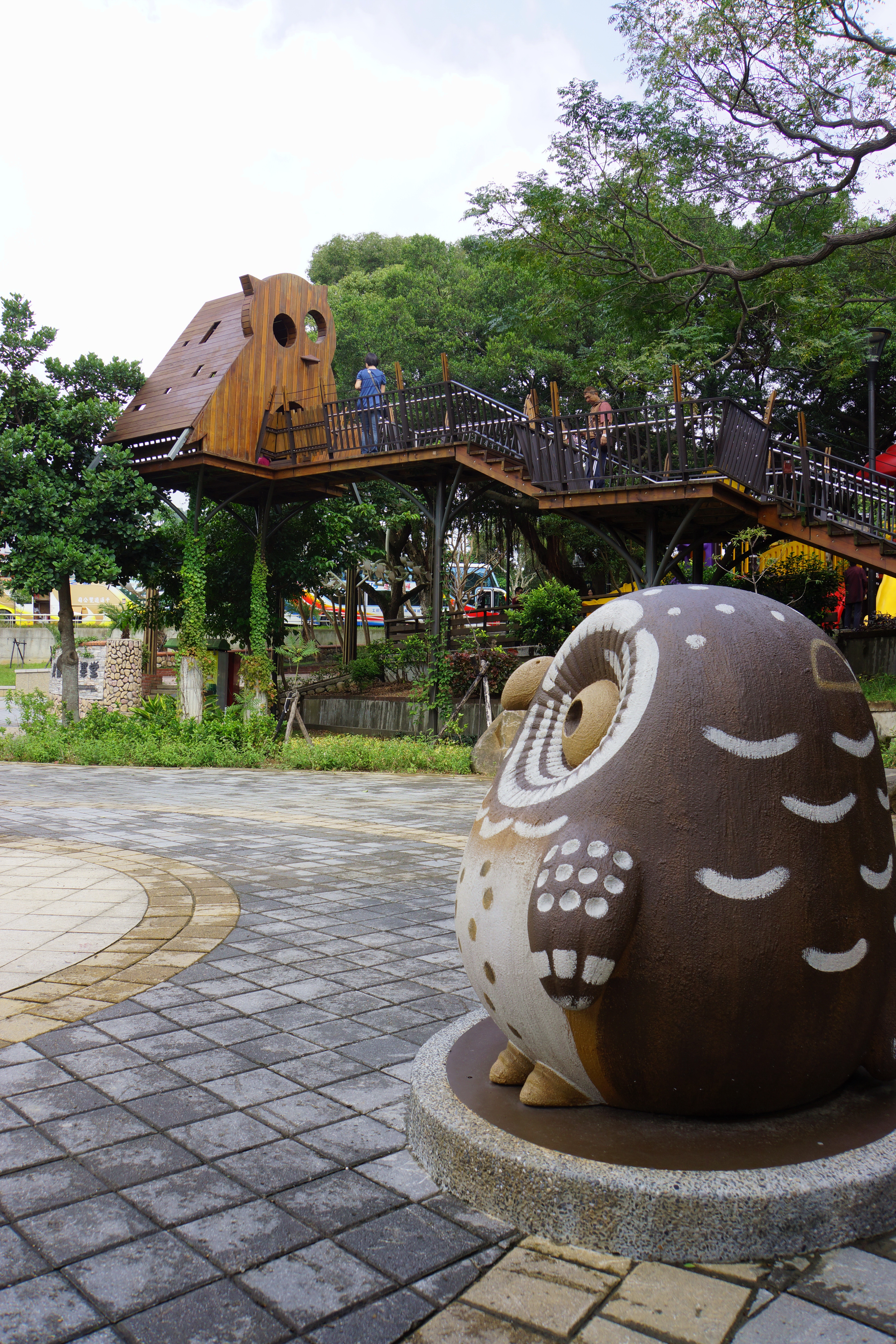
Owl Forest School

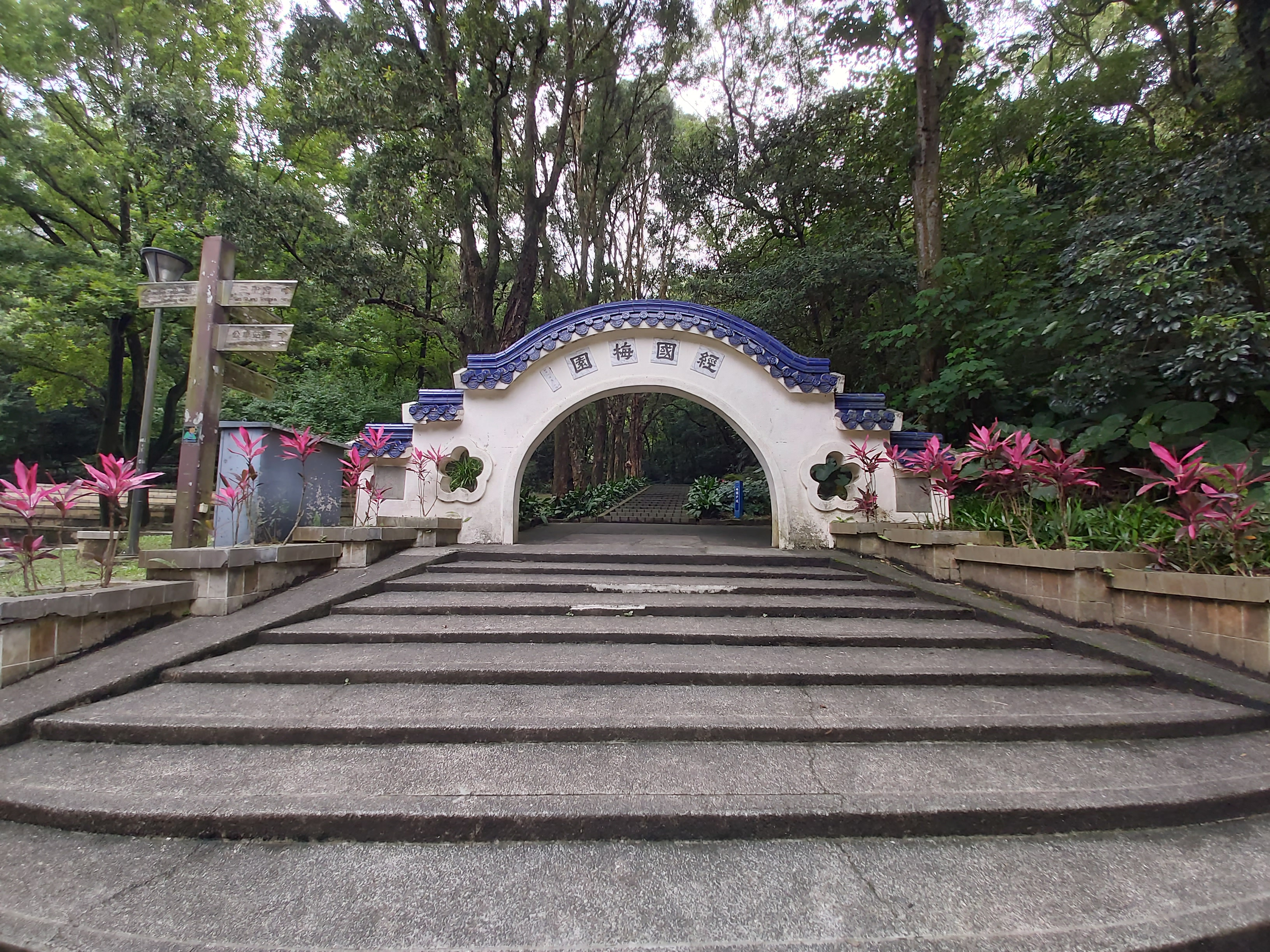
Jingguo Plum Garden

== See also ==
- Taoyuan Martyrs' Shrine
- Geography of Taiwan
- List of parks in Taiwan
