= Chinese Furniture Museum =

Museum in Taoyuan District, Taoyuan City, Taiwan

- 中國家具博物館
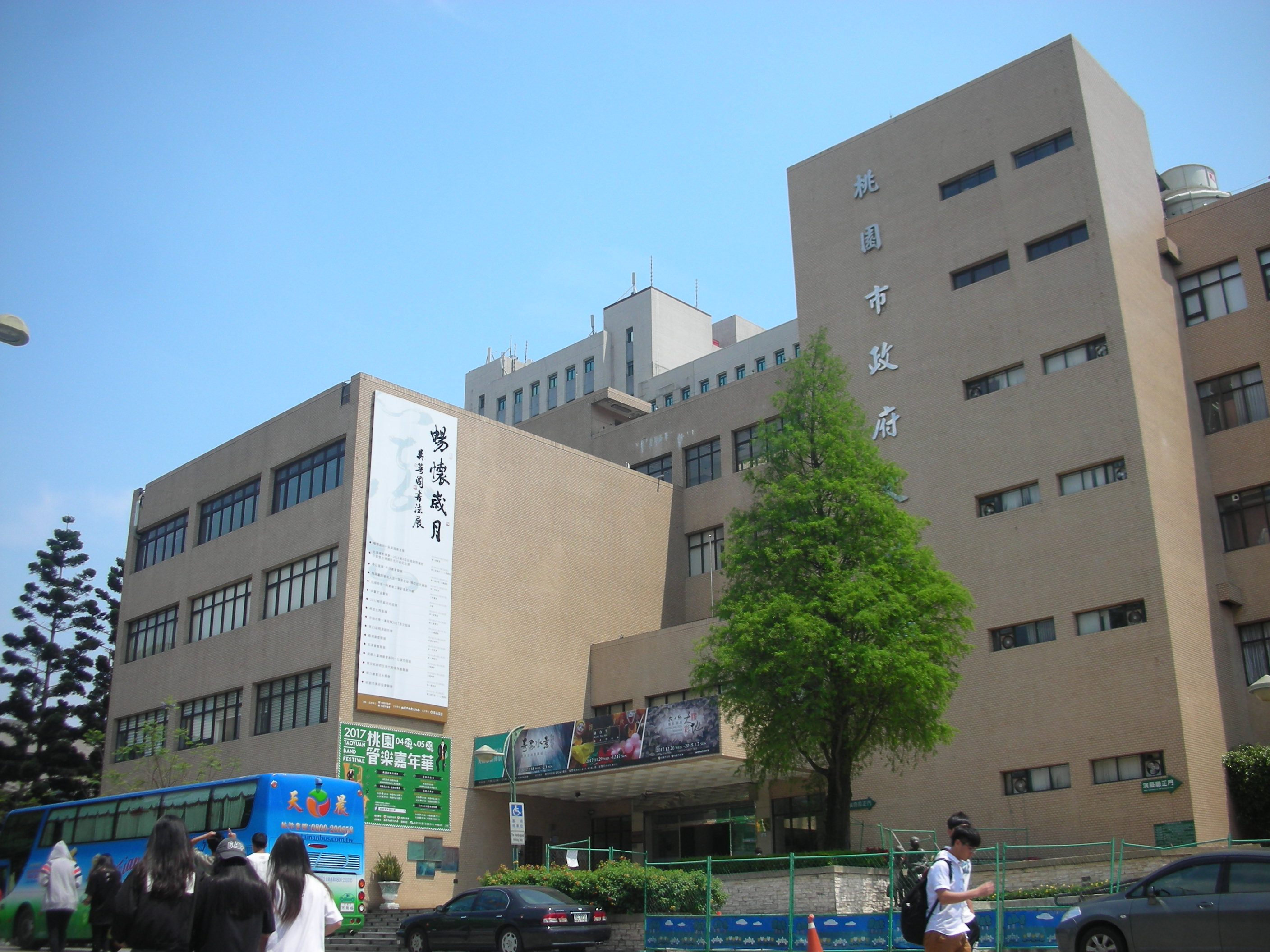
- Established: December 1992
- Location: Taoyuan District, Taoyuan City, Taiwan
- Coordinates: 24°59′37″N 121°18′08″E
- Type: museum

The Chinese Furniture Museum (traditional Chinese: 中國家具博物館; simplified Chinese: 中国家具博物馆; pinyin: Zhōngguó Jiājù Bówùguǎn) or China's Furniture Museum was a museum in Taoyuan District, Taoyuan City, Taiwan. The museum's purpose was to continue and promote the culture of traditional Chinese furniture and to coordinate with the forest resources of Taoyuan City and the quality traditional furniture craftsmanship of Daxi District.

== History ==
The idea for the museum was originally established by the suggestion of the Minister of Council for Cultural Affairs Chen Chi-lu after an inspection tour around Taiwan in 1984 to visit all of the cultural centers around the island.

The construction of the museum started in September 1996 in three phases due to budget considerations. The phase one construction mainly focused on the special exhibitions of traditional Chinese furniture and furniture made in Daxi. The phase two construction focused on the furniture in early Taiwanese life and the traditional art furniture making. And the phase three construction focused on the peripheral facilities to the museum and space for research. All of the construction works were completed in December 1992.

Operations ceased in 2019.

== Architecture ==
The museum was located on the basement level inside the Cultural Affairs Bureau of Taoyuan City Government occupying an area of 900 m^{2}.

== Exhibitions ==
=== Exhibition Room I ===
Exhibition Room I housed the special exhibitions on traditional Chinese furniture and furniture made in Daxi. The exhibitions included the terminology, chronicle of the evolution of furniture, furniture in ancient paintings and buildings, revered master craftsmen, characteristics of traditional furniture, the making of furniture, types of traditional Chinese furniture, traditional Taiwanese furniture, special exhibition on traditional furniture from Daxi, prospects and market expansion.

=== Exhibition Room II ===
Exhibition Room II housed traditional Taiwanese furniture and traditional furniture production techniques. The room was divided into the Main Entrance and Courtyard, the Kitchen and Dining Room, the Study and Accounting Office, the Ancestor Worship Room, the Bedroom, Furniture for Reference and Making of Traditional Furniture. The peripheral of the museum includes the audio visual showing room, the library, the research area etc.

== See also ==
- List of museums in Taiwan
- Chinese furniture
