= Taoyuan Main Public Library =

Library in Taoyuan, Taiwan

- 桃園市立圖書館
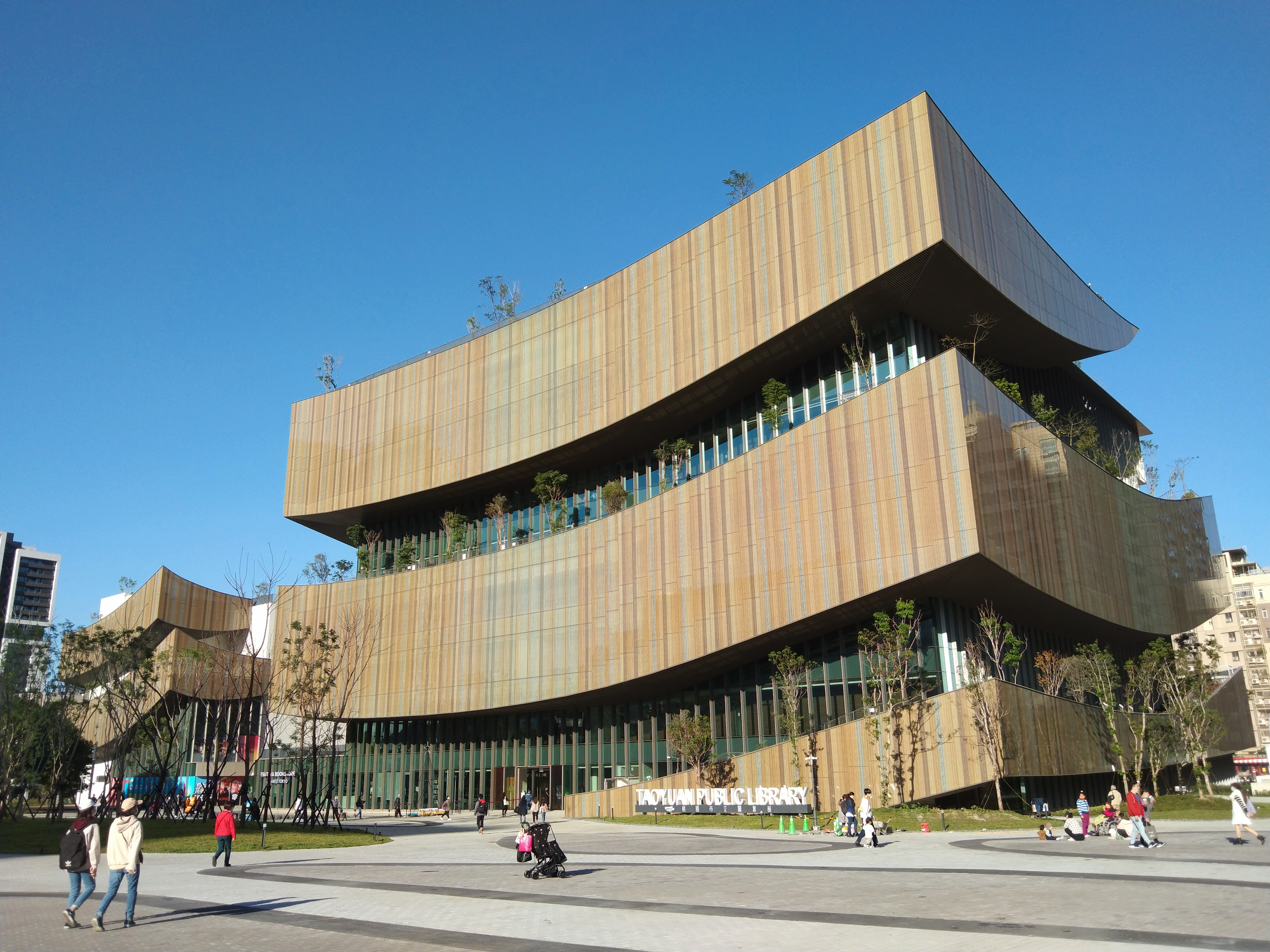
- New building of Taoyuan Main Public Library
- 25°01′04″N 121°18′00″E
- Location: Taoyuan District, Taoyuan, Taiwan
- Type: Public library
- Established: 1983
- Branches: 42 (38 branches, 4 reading rooms)

Collection
- Items collected: 1,000,000 (2022 estimated)

Other information
- Director: Tang Liang-Cheng
- Website: https://www.typl.gov.tw

Taoyuan Main Public Library (Chinese: 桃園市立圖書館; pinyin: Táoyuán Shìlì Túshūguǎn) is the central library of Taoyuan, Taiwan. It is located on Nanping Road, Taoyuan District, and it is a part of Taoyuan Zhongzheng Arts and Cultural Business District. The main library was estimated to be completed by the end of 2021, and it began trial operation on December 17, 2022. It is the largest local public library and the fourth largest public library in Taiwan by total area, after National Central Library, National Taiwan Library and National Library of Public Information.

== Architecture ==
=== Old building ===
The former building of Taoyuan Main Public Library was located in the Department of Cultural Affairs building of Taoyuan City Government. It was opened in 1983, comprisound floors and oes 5 above-grne below. It was changed to "Library of Cultural Affairs Bureau" after the opening of the new main library.

=== New building ===
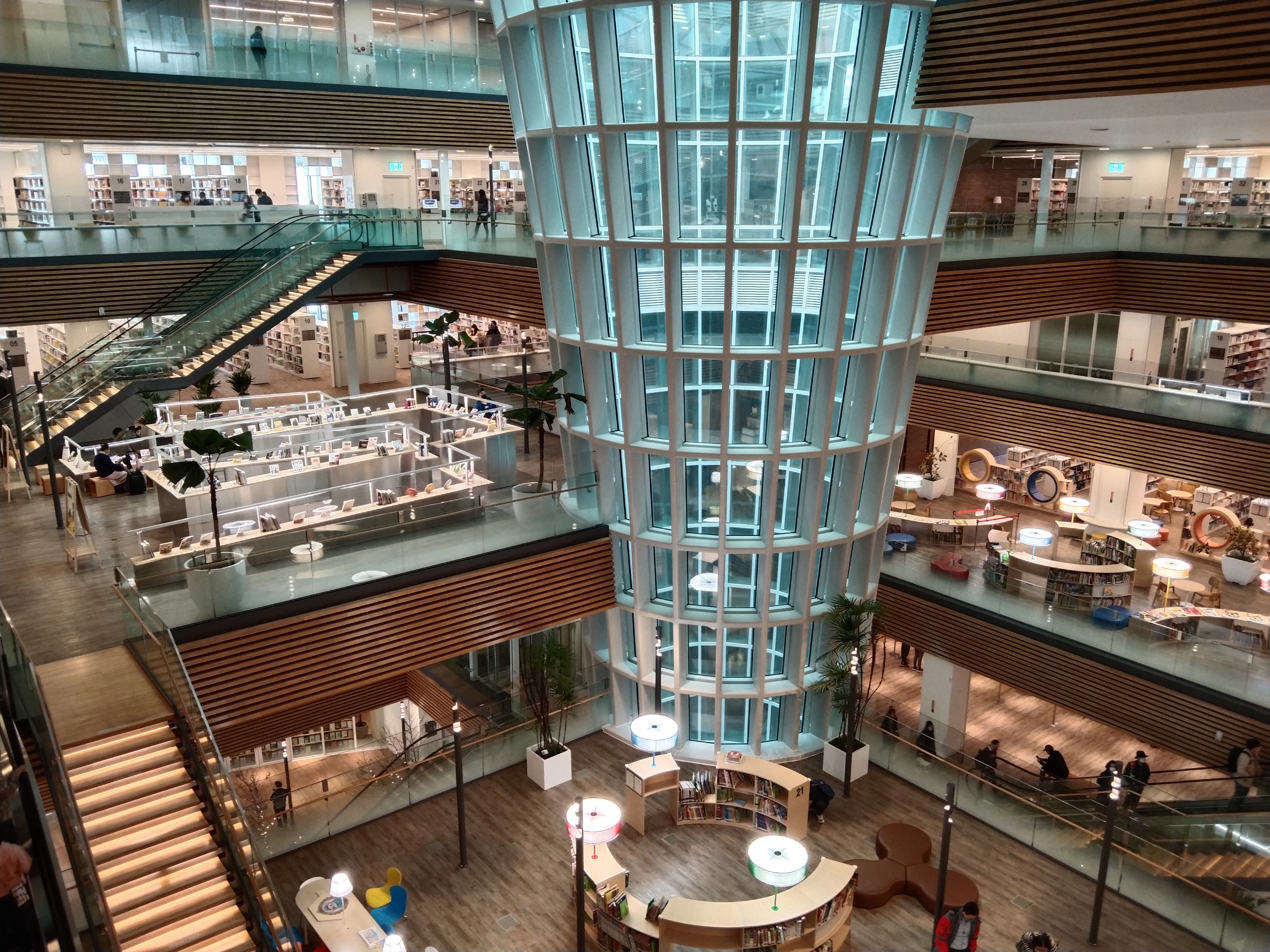
The interior of the library features a cone-shaped "Eco Tube."

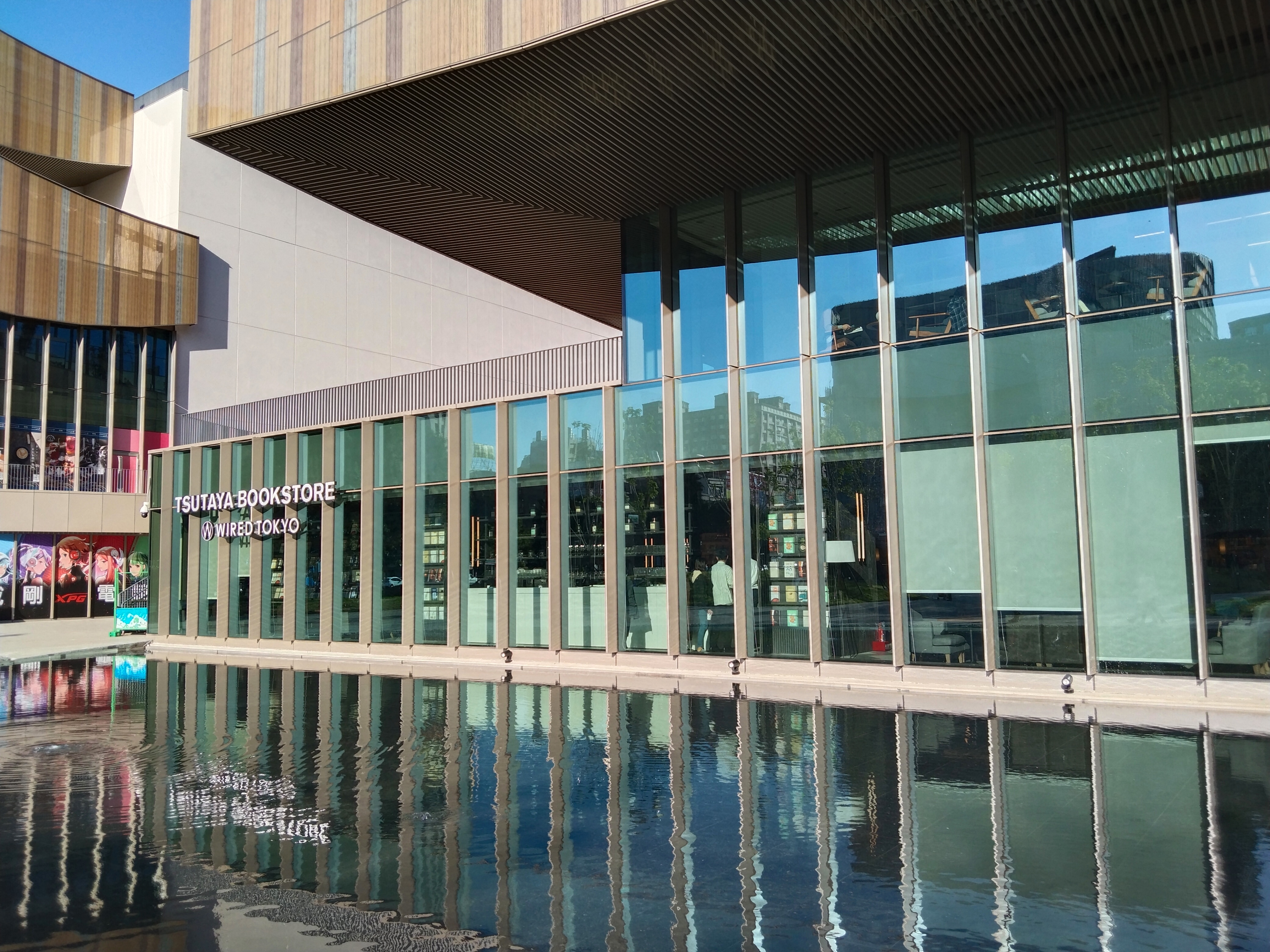
Tsutaya Bookstore (1F)

The new building of Taoyuan Main Public Library consists of two buildings above the ground, the library and the cinema, which will be connected by a balcony on the second floor. The library comprises 8 above-ground floors and two below, in addition to the library, there are facilities such as cinemas, cultural and creative plazas, and theme restaurants. The design competition was held on April 12, 2017. T.C.K. Architect Engineer Planner and Azusa Sekkei (Japan) won the first place with the green building theme of "Tree of Life". The design concept of the "Tree of Life" is composed of five elements: "Eco Tube", "Knowledge Spiral", "Bookshelf Structure", "Green Spiral" and "Eco Skin".

=== Floor plan ===
Floor	Use
8	General Affairs, Mail Room, Bidding Announcement Room, Meeting Room
7	Audio-Visual Area, On-Air Studio, Language Learning Area, Promotional Activities Area, Group Rooms, Information Searching Area, Meeting Room
6	General Collections (900), Multicultural Zone, Reference, Local Collections, Taoyuan District Resource Center
5	General Collections (500-800), New Arrivals
4	General Collections (000-400), Teen Reading Area, Group Rooms, Maker Space
3	Family Reading Area, Display Area, Parent-Child Study Room, Story Theater, Foreign Language Children's Books
2	Information, Self-Checkout Area, Visual Impairment Service, Senior Reading Area, Periodicals/Newspapers, Copy Area
1	Public Lobby, Lecture Hall, Studying Room, Bookstore/Shopping Mall, Security
B1	Automobile Parking, Motorcycle Parking
B2	Automobile Parking

Taoyuan Main Public Library

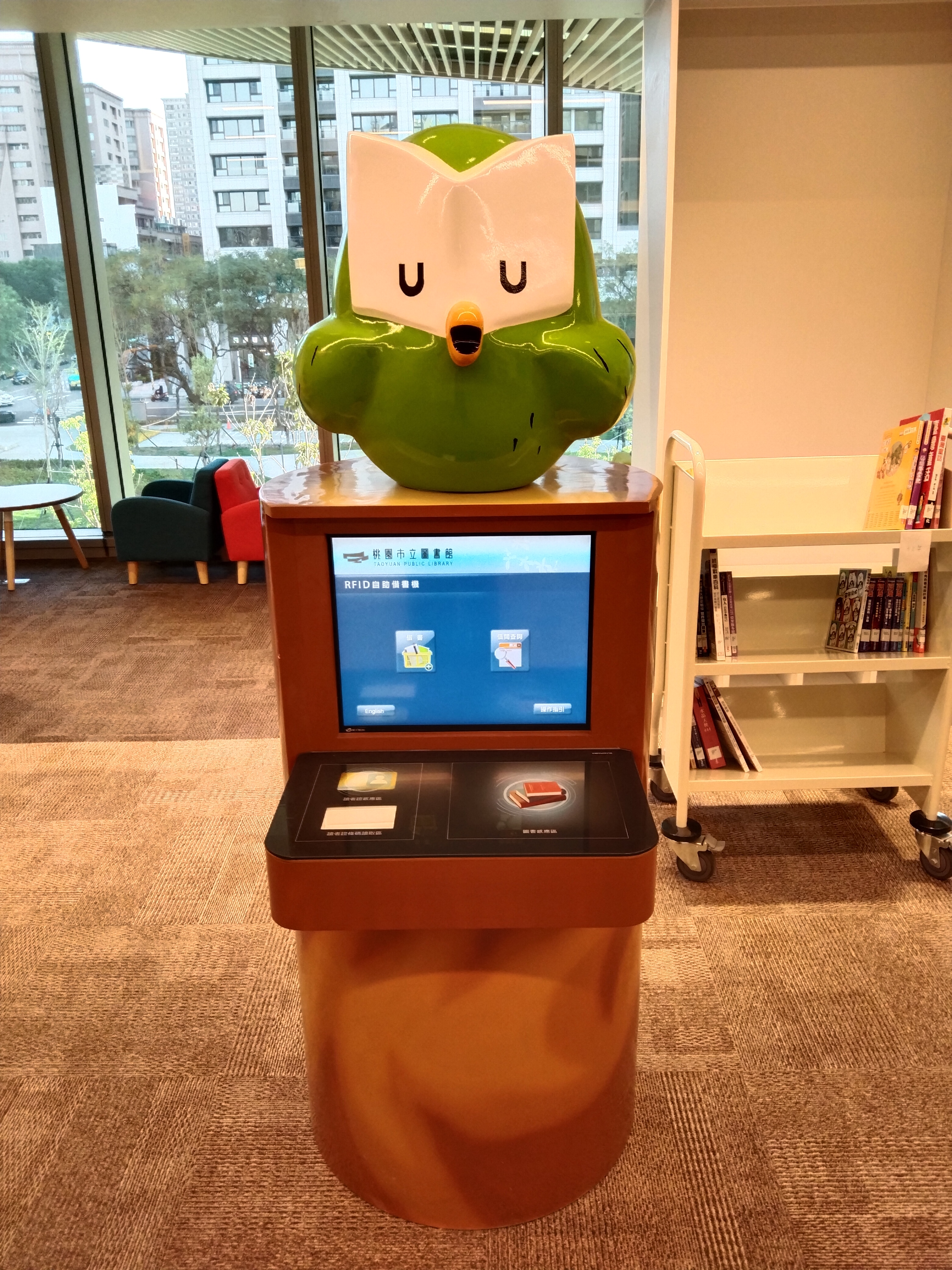
RFID Self-Checkout Machine, Children's Area (3F)

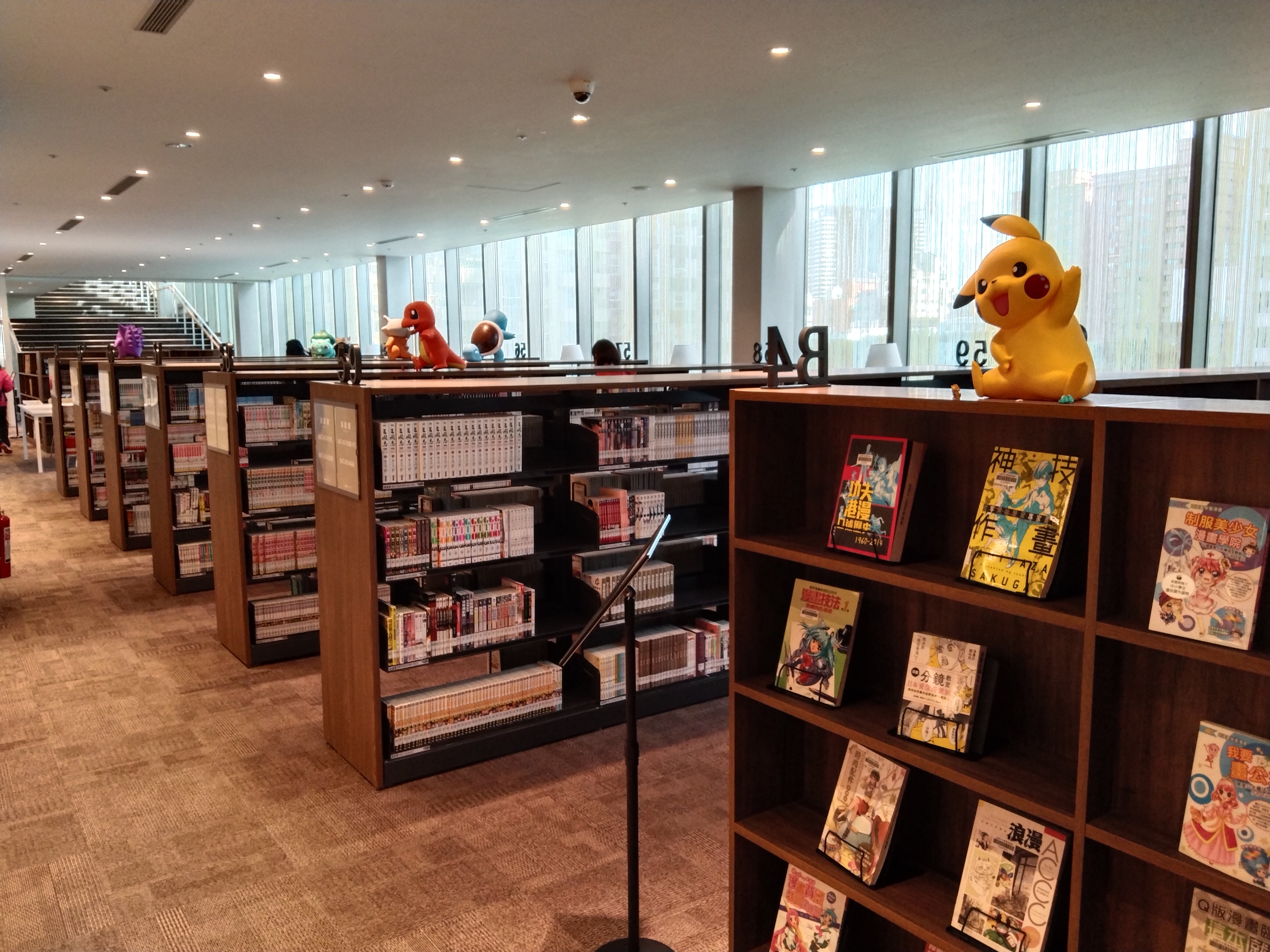
Comics Area (4F)

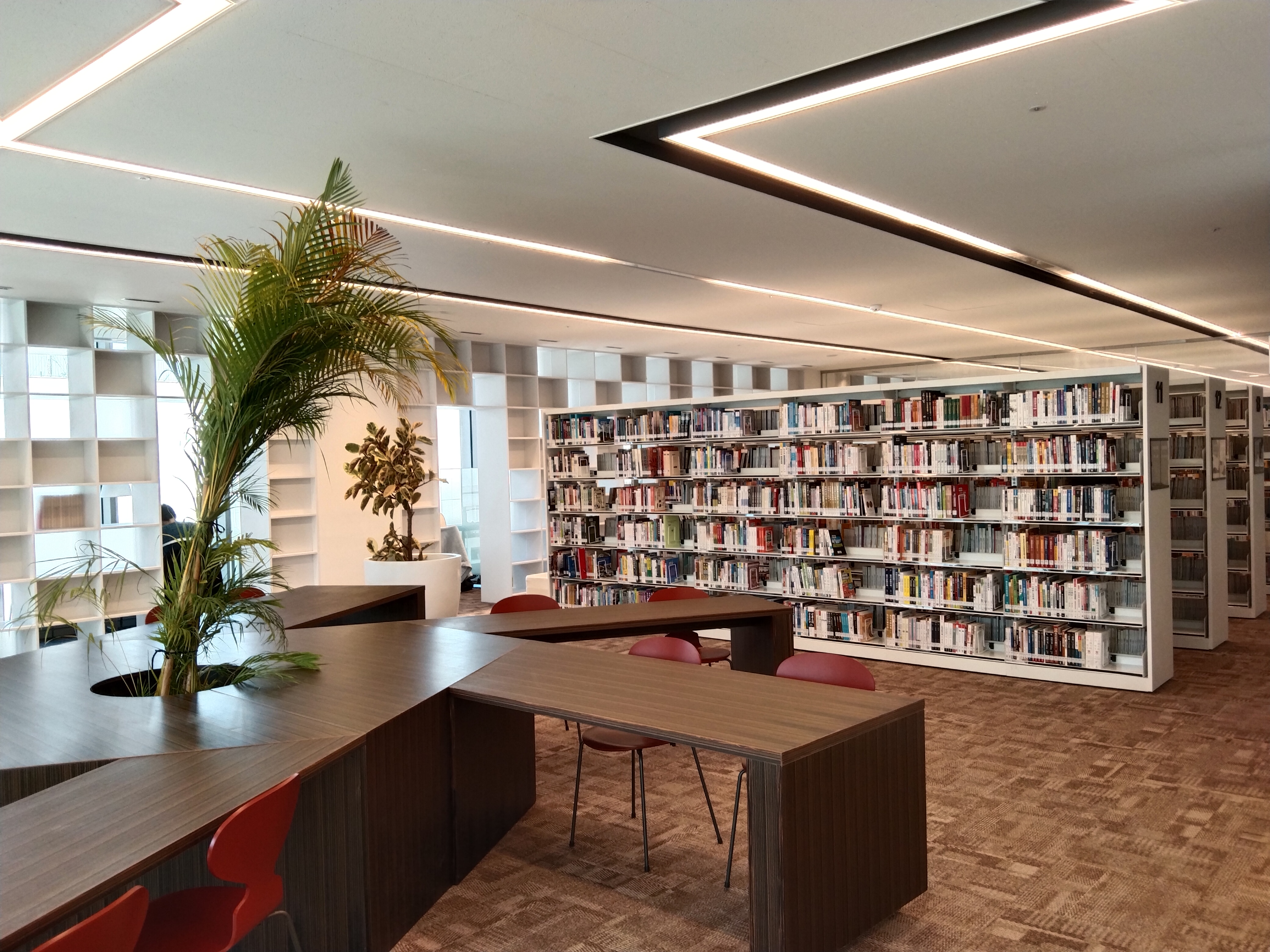
Book Collections Area (5F)

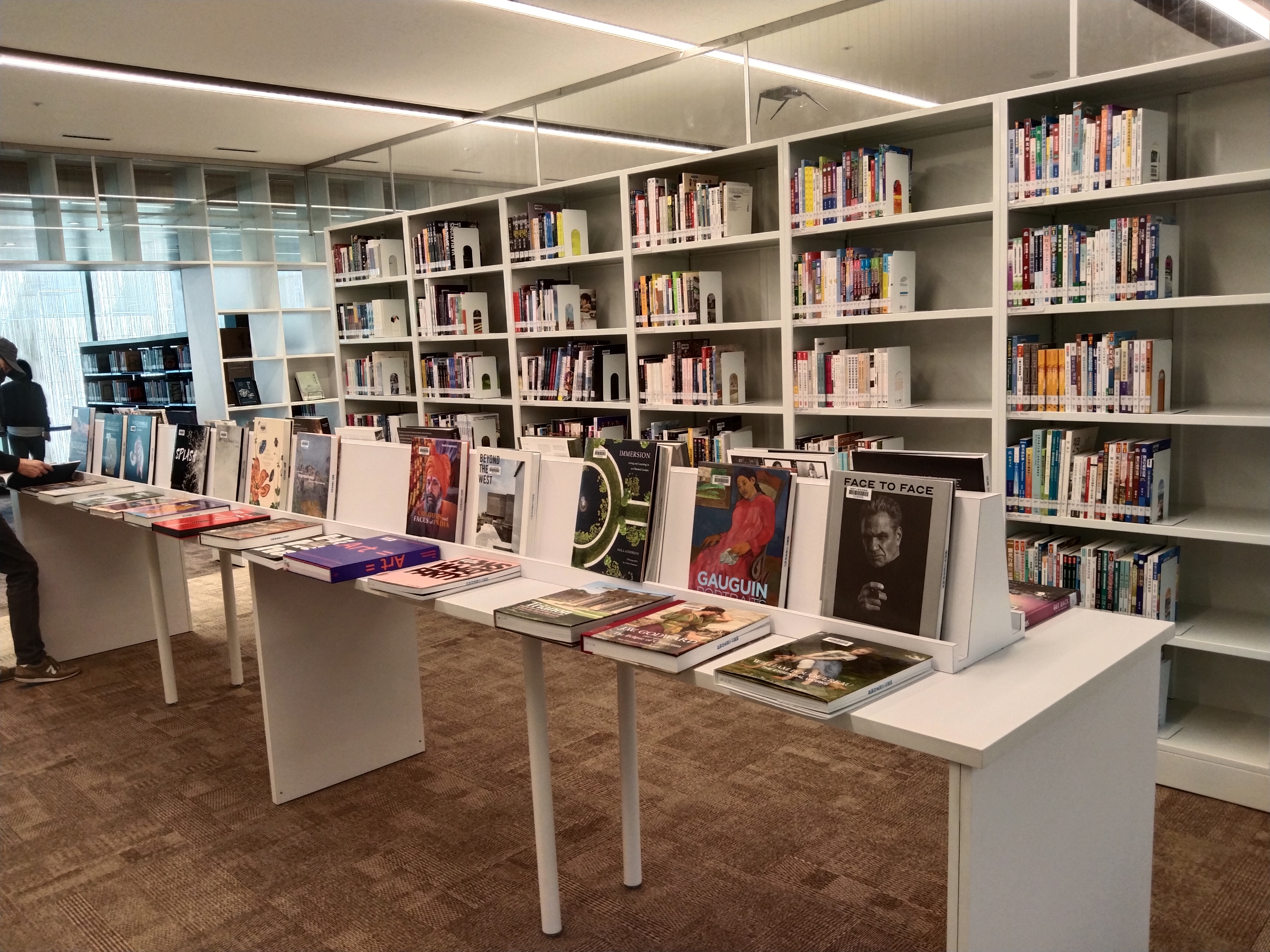
Book Collections Area (6F)

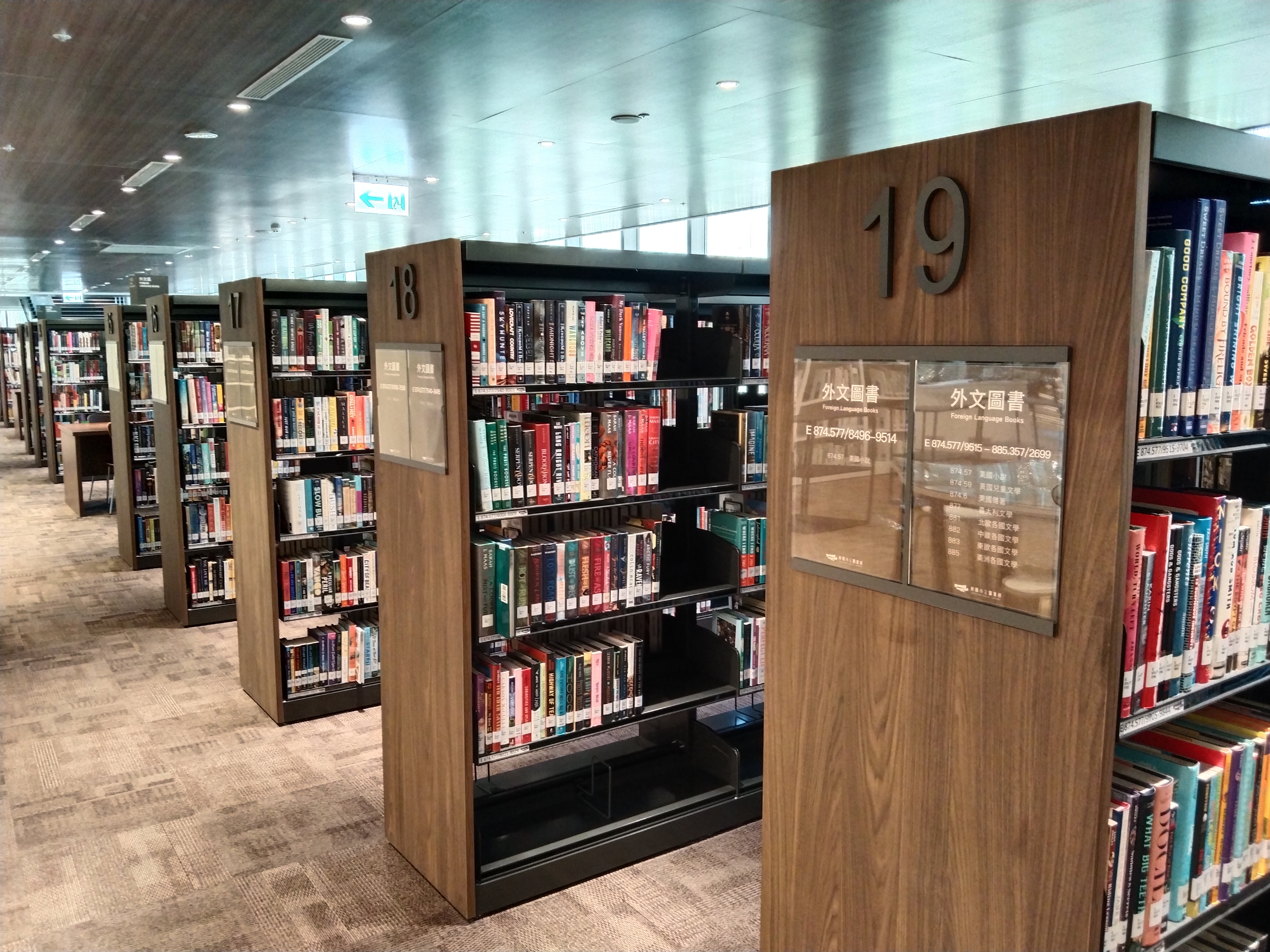
Foreign Language Collections Area (6F)

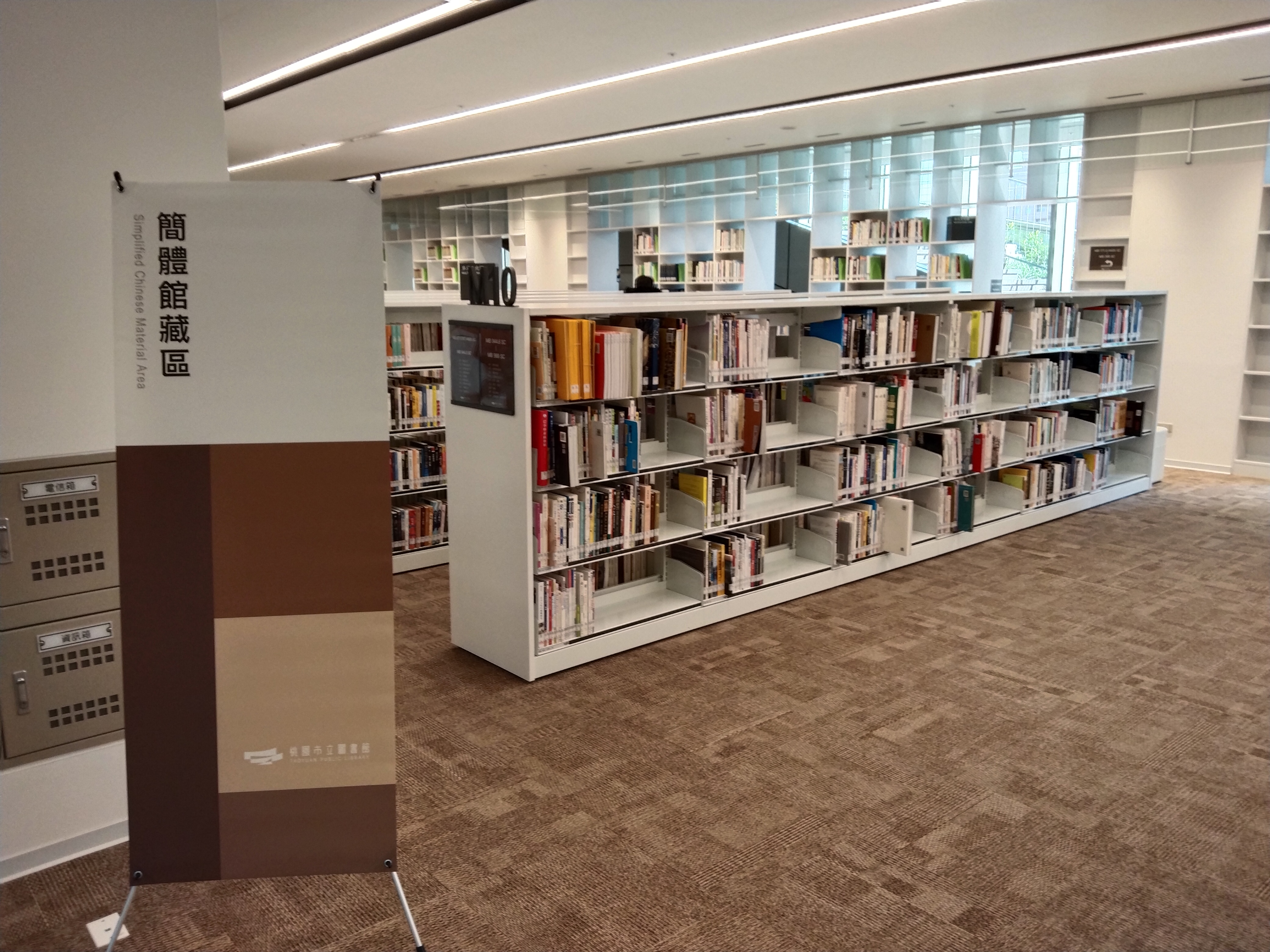
Simplified Chinese Collections Area (6F)

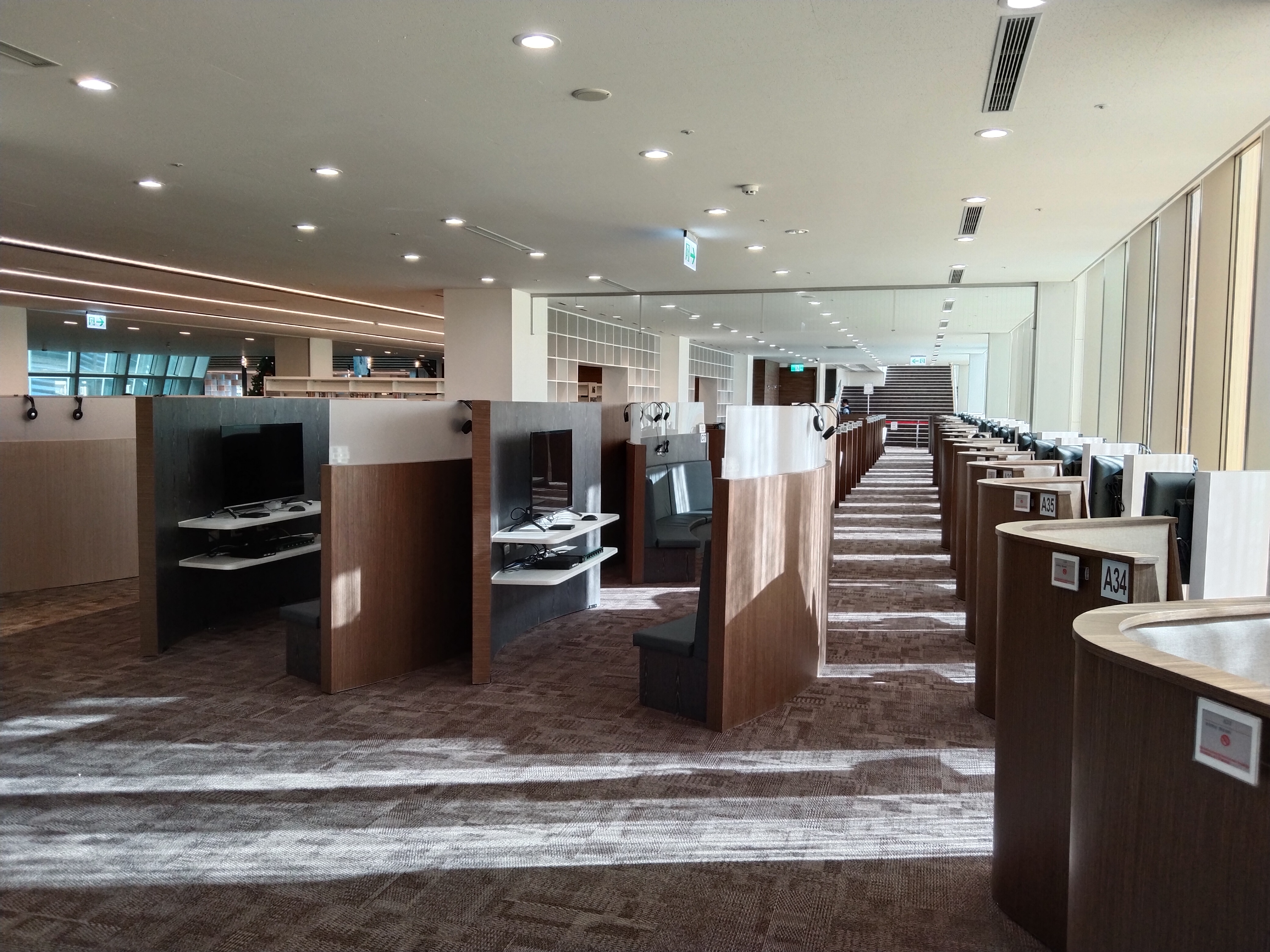
Audio-Visual Area (7F)
