= Taoyuan District =

Taoyuan 桃園區
- District
- Taoyuan District
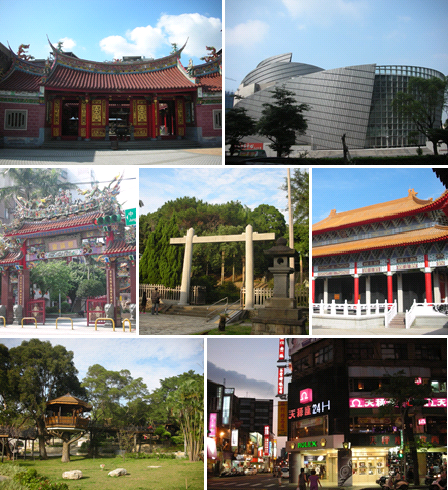
- Clockwise from center: Taoyuan Martyrs' Shrine, Hutoushan Park, Taoyuan Jinfu Temple, Taoyuan Wenchang Temple, Taoyuan Exhibition Center, Taoyuan Confucius Temple, Zhongzhen Road

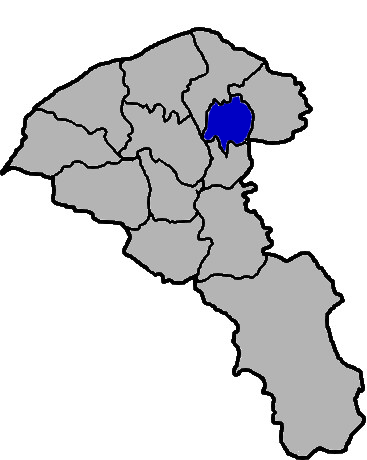
- Coordinates: 25°00′N 121°18′E
- Country: Taiwan
- Municipality: Taoyuan City

Area
  - Total: 34.8046 km^{2} (13.4381 sq mi)

Population (December 2024)
  - Total: 475,798
  - Density: 13,189/km^{2} (34,160/sq mi)
- Time zone: UTC+8
- Postal code: 330
- Website: www.tao.tycg.gov.tw (in Chinese)

Taoyuan District (Chinese: 桃園區; pinyin: Táoyuán Qū) is a district of Taoyuan City in northwestern Taiwan. Formerly a county-administered city also known as Taoyuan City (桃園市) before 2014, when the former Taoyuan County was elevated to a special municipality which is now known as Taoyuan City, which this district share with the same name. The municipal seat of Taoyuan City is situated within the district. It is the most populous district among the 13 districts of Taoyuan City, and the second most populous among the districts of Taiwan, with the most populous being Banqiao District in New Taipei City.

== History ==
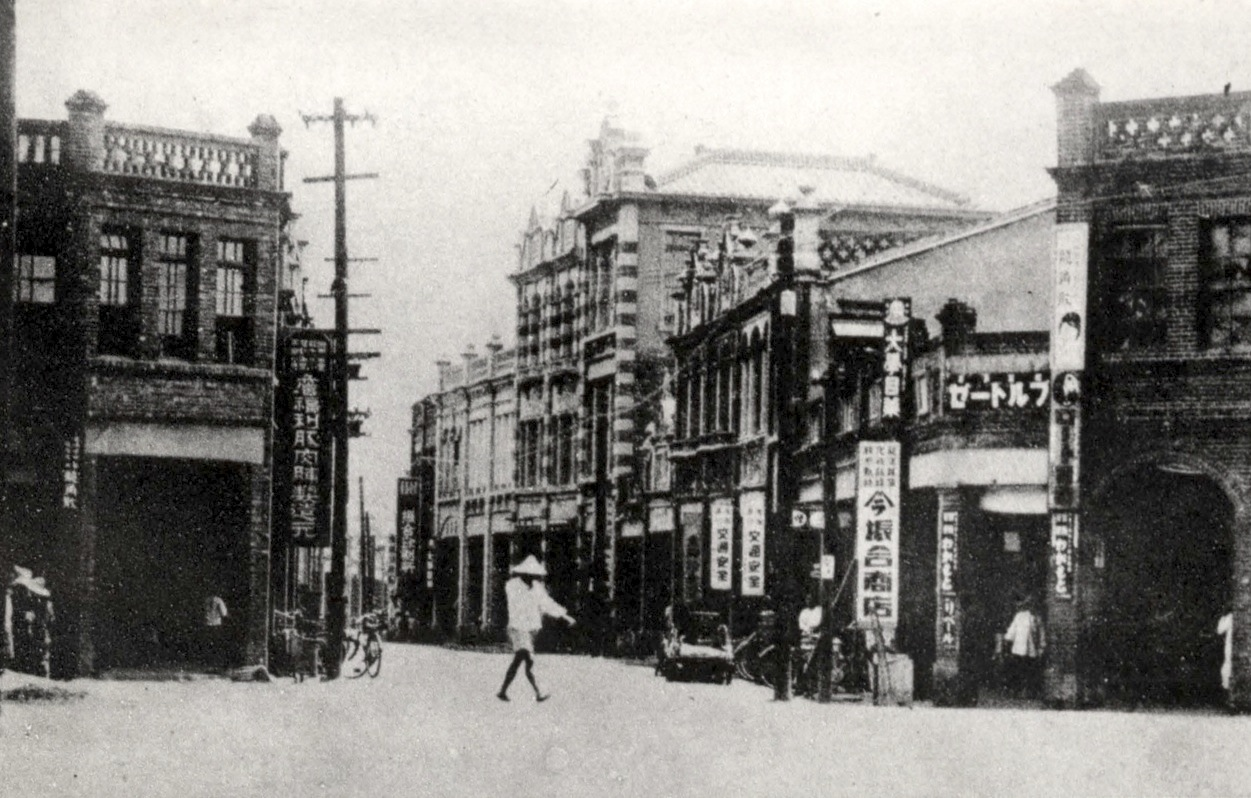
Street scene in Tōen ca. 1939, during Japanese rule.

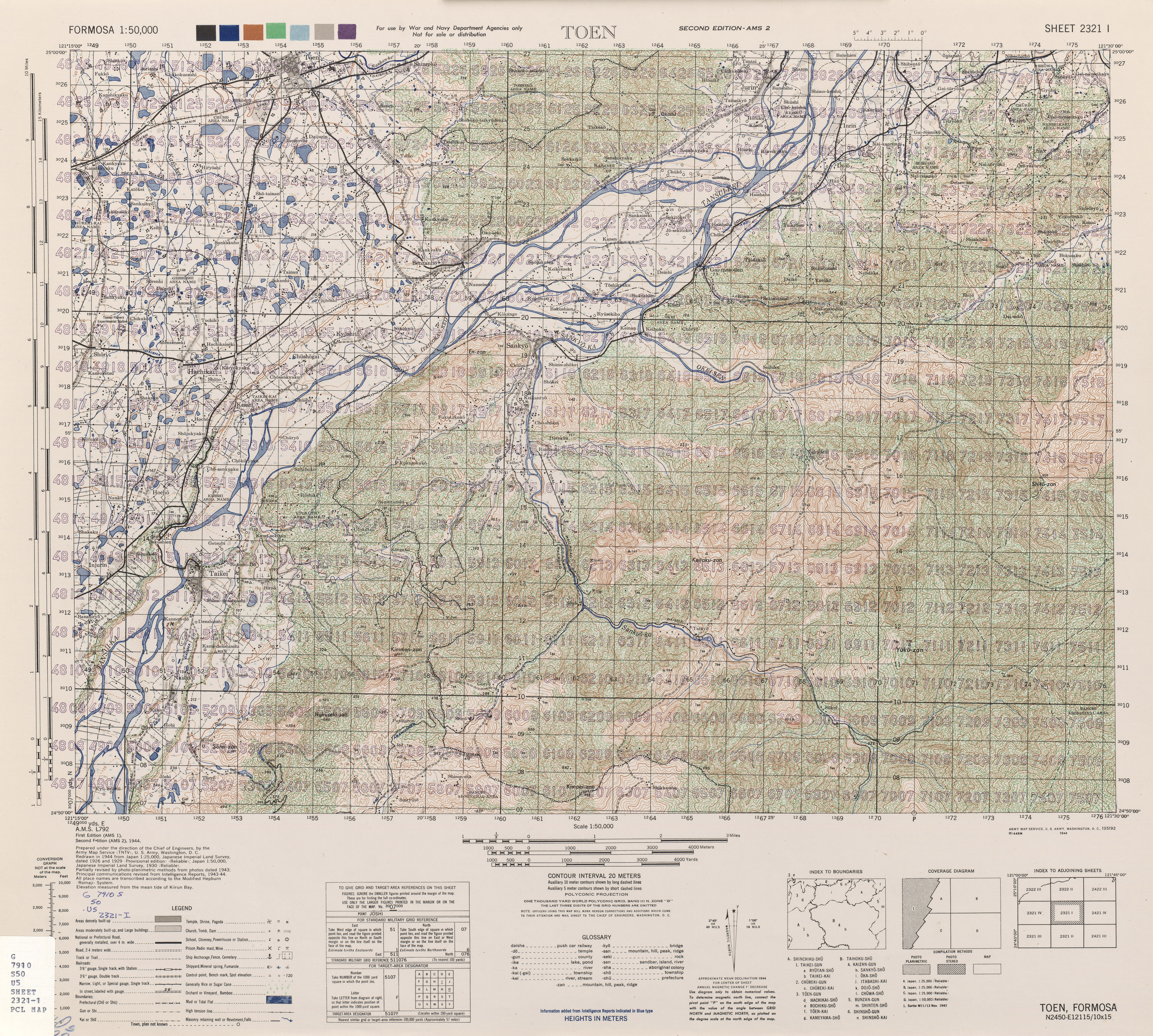
Map of Taoyuan (labeled as Tōen) (1944)

Taoyuan is the native home of the plains tribes of Taiwanese aborigines. Taoyuan's old name was Toahong (Chinese: 桃仔園; pinyin: Táozǐyuán; Pe̍h-ōe-jī: Thô-á-hn̂g; lit. 'peach orchard') since there used to be many peach blossoms in the area.

=== Empire of Japan ===
Under Japanese rule, the area was part of Toshien Chō (桃仔園廳) established in November 1901. In 1920, it was renamed Tōen Town (桃園街), and incorporated into Tōen District, Shinchiku Prefecture.

=== Republic of China ===
After the handover of Taiwan from Japan to the Republic of China, it was reorganized as Taoyuan Town of Taoyuan County. On 21 April 1971, the town was upgraded from an urban township to a county-administered city called Taoyuan City. On 25 December 2014, the city became a district of the newly formed special municipality of Taoyuan City.

== Geography ==
Taoyuan is located on the Taoyuan Plateau, contiguous on the northeast to Guishan District. The Nankan River is Taoyuan's largest river, flowing from the southeast to the northwest.

- Area: 34.80 km^{2} (13.44 sq mi)
- Elevation: 157 ft (48 m)
- Population: 464,480 people (February 2023)

=== Climate ===
Taoyuan has a humid subtropical climate (Köppen climate classification: Cfa), with hot summers and mild winters. Precipitation is high throughout the year and is generally higher in the first half of the year. Due to the effect of wind from mainland China, Taoyuan is typically cooler than New Taipei, despite having a lower latitude.

== Administrative divisions ==
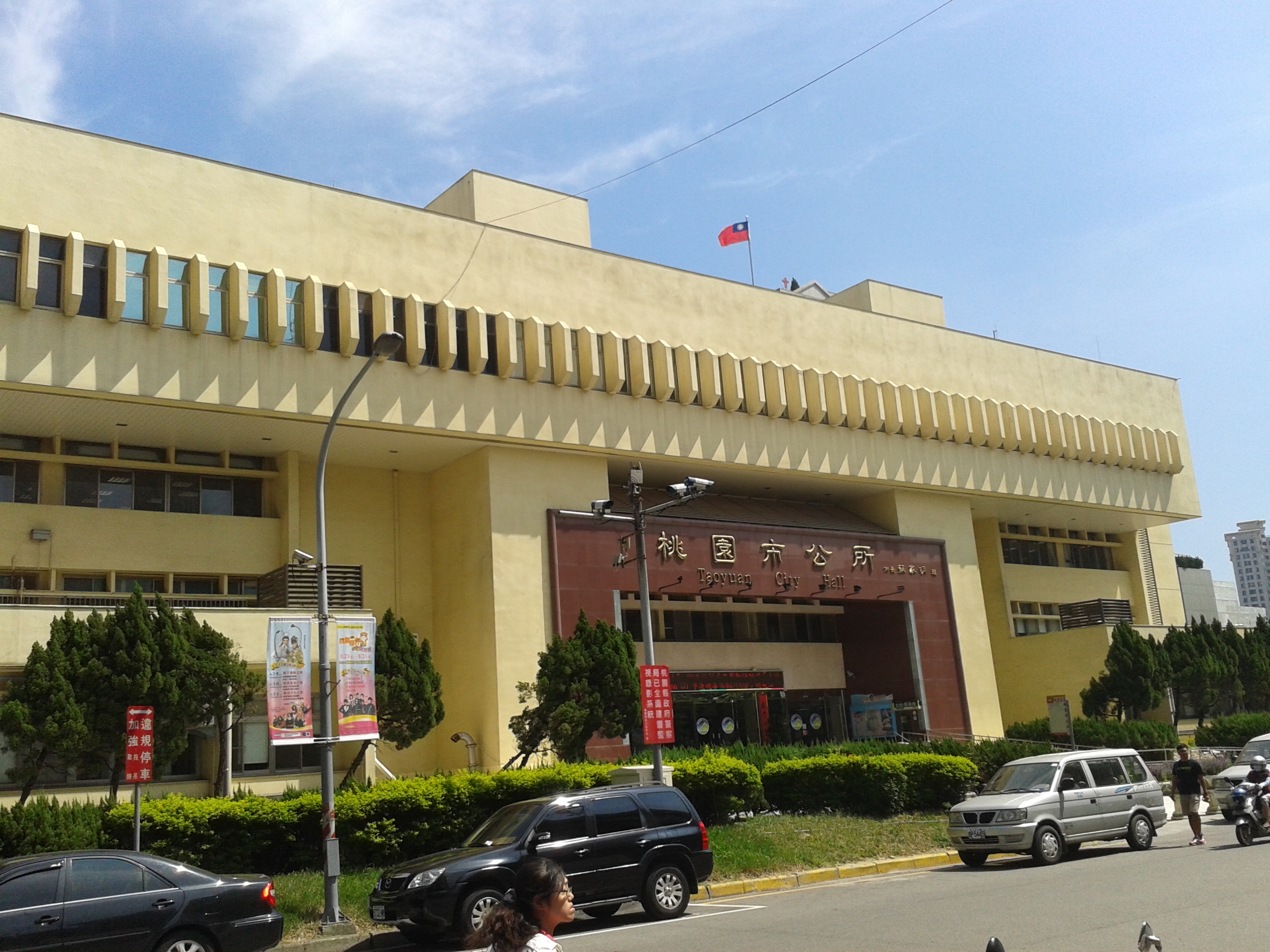
Taoyuan District office

Dalin, Dafeng, Jianguo, Yunlin, Fuan, Fulin, Fenglin, Zhonghe, Zhongxing, Wenhua, Wenchang, Wenming, Beimen, Minsheng, Yongxing, Guangxing, Ximen, Xihu, Wuling, Zhangmei, Nanmen, Nanhua, Zhongshan, Zhongping, Zhongzheng, Zhongcheng, Zhongxin, Zhongyuan, Zhongtai, Zhongsheng, Zhonglu, Zhongde, Wenzhong, Yushan, Taishan, Longshan, Longan, Longgang, Longxiang, Longshou, Longfeng, Zhongpu, Zhongning, Beipu, Yongan, Tongan, Tongde, Zijiang, Xipu, Mingde, Tungpu, Zhangan, Zhangde, Xinguang, Nanpu, Zhuangjing, Ciwen, Xinpu, Ruiqing, Bao'an, Baoqing, Sanyuan, Sanmin, Dayou, Daxing, Chenggong, Bianzhou, Zhongyi, Tungshan, Tungmen, Jingxi, Chunri, Zhaoyang, Guiji, Wanshou and Baoshan Village.

== Government institutions ==
- Taoyuan City Government
- Taoyuan City Council

== Education ==
Within Taoyuan, there are 6 senior high schools, 14 junior high schools, 23 primary schools, and an "intelligence initiation school." Taoyuan is also home to a number of buxibans, or cram schools or language schools, which teach additional courses in mathematics, English, science, etc. There are also 10 universities located in Taoyuan.

Taoyuan Main Public Library is the central library of Taoyuan city.

== Economy ==
Taoyuan was one of the host cities for the Taiwan European Film Festival in 2012.

== Transportation ==
Taoyuan District is served by Taiwan Railway Administration's Taoyuan railway station. The current station is expected to be converted to an underground station in 2029. In addition, the future underground Zhonglu railway station is also expected to serve the district in 2030. Taoyuan Metro's Green line is also under construction and will serve the district in the future.

=== Railway ===
- Taoyuan railway station
- Zhonglu railway station (under construction)

=== Metro ===
- Nankan Bus Station (2026)
- Taoyuan Performance Arts Center metro station (2026)
- Daxing West Road metro station (2027)
- Minguang Road metro station (2027)
- Yonghe Market metro station (2027)
- Taoyuan Main Station (2027)
- Yangming Park metro station (2027)

=== Bus ===
- San Chung Bus Company
- Taoyuan Bus Company
- United Highway Bus Company
- Zhinan Bus Company
- Zhongli Bus Company

== International relations ==
=== Twin towns – Sister cities ===
Taoyuan is twinned with:

- Radom, Poland
- Irvine, California, United States
- Kennewick, Washington, United States

== Tourist attractions ==
- Chaoyang Forest Park
- Chinese Furniture Museum
- Coca-Cola Museum
- Daguixi Park
- Dayou Ecological Park
- Fenghe Park
- Guixi Riverside Park
- Hutou Mountain Park
- Sanmin Sports Park
- Taoyuan Arts Center
- Taoyuan Confucian Temple
- Taoyuan Land God Culture Museum (桃園市土地公文化館)
- Taoyuan Martyrs' Shrine
- Taoyuan Jingfu Temple
- Taoyuan Night Market
- Taoyuan Tableland and Ponds
- Tong'an Parent-Child Park
- Yangming Sports Park

== Notable natives ==
- Wu Ming-yi, artist and author
