= Taoyuan Martyrs' Shrine =

Coordinates: 25°00′22.6″N 121°19′31.0″E

Taoyuan Martyrs' Shrine 桃園忠烈祠
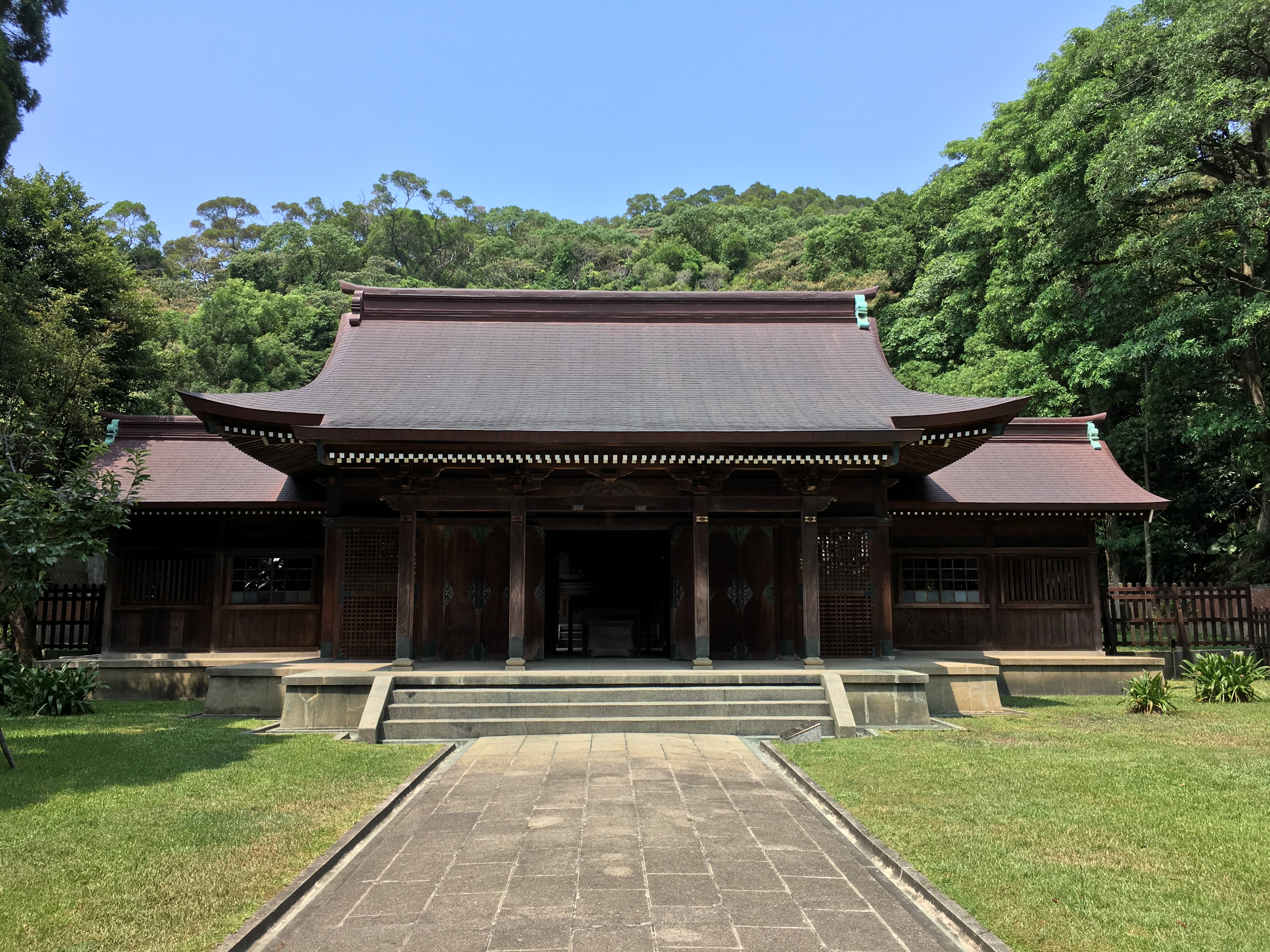
- Interactive map of Taoyuan Martyrs' Shrine 桃園忠烈祠
- Location: Taoyuan District, Taiyuan, Taiwan

History
- Built: 1938
- Built for: Japanese Shinto deities.

The Taoyuan Martyrs' Shrine (Chinese: 桃園忠烈祠; pinyin: Táoyuán Zhōngliècí) is a martyrs' shrine in Taoyuan District, Taoyuan City, Taiwan.

== History ==
Taoyuan Martyrs' Shrine was built by the Japanese as the Touen Shinto Shrine (桃園神社) in 1938. After World War II, the Kuomintang government changed the Shinto Shrine into Hsinchu County Martyrs' Shrine, then 1950 became Taoyuan County Martyrs' Shrine. Statue of Koxinga and tablets of numerous Chinese war heroes like Liu Yongfu were honoured in the main shrine.

== Architecture ==
Taoyuan Martyrs' Shrine is one of the best-kept Shinto shrines outside of Japan. The structure is made largely of unpainted, unvarnished cypress, and the shrine incorporates Japanese and modern Taiwanese architectural styles.

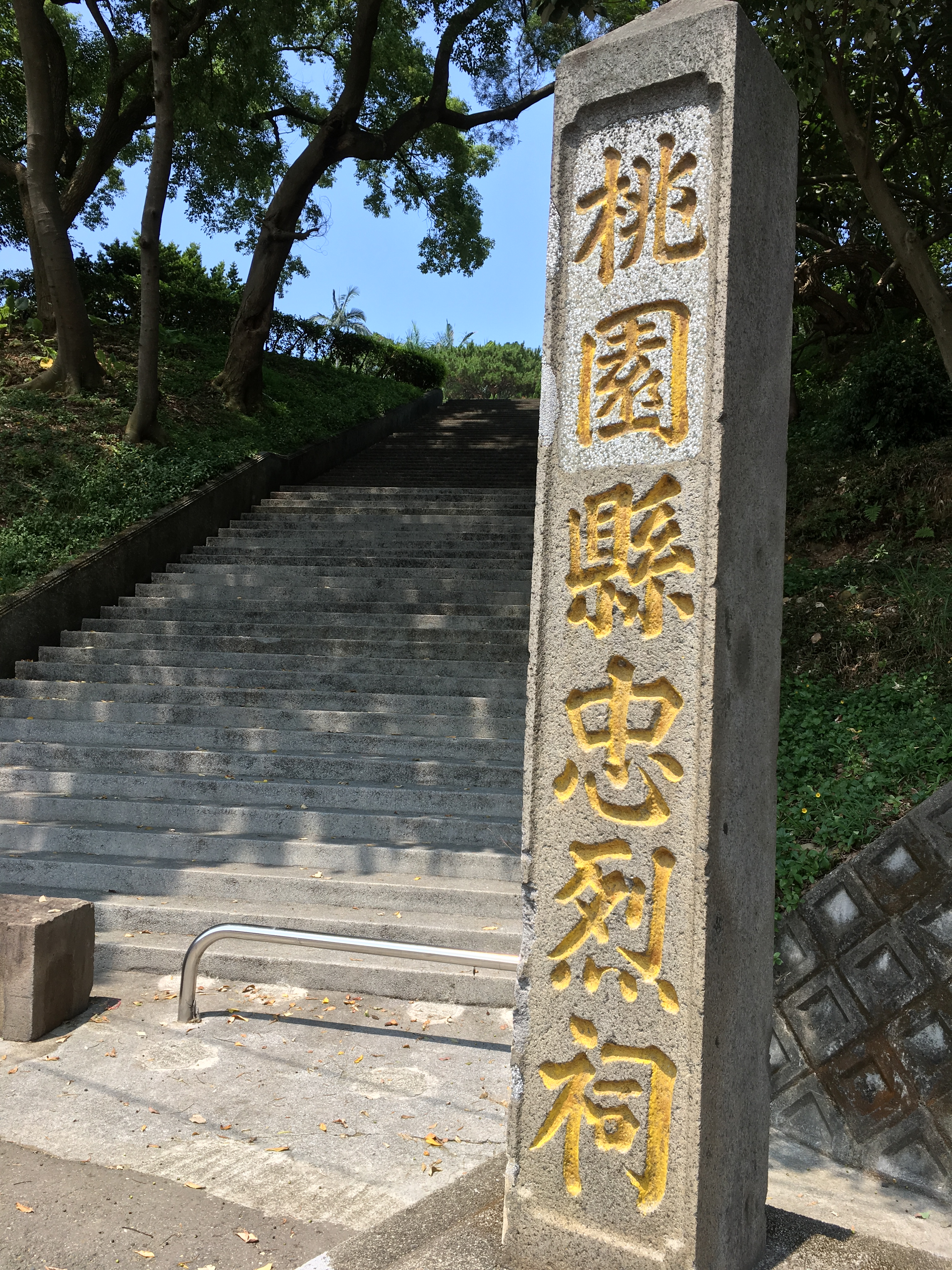
Naming Pillar

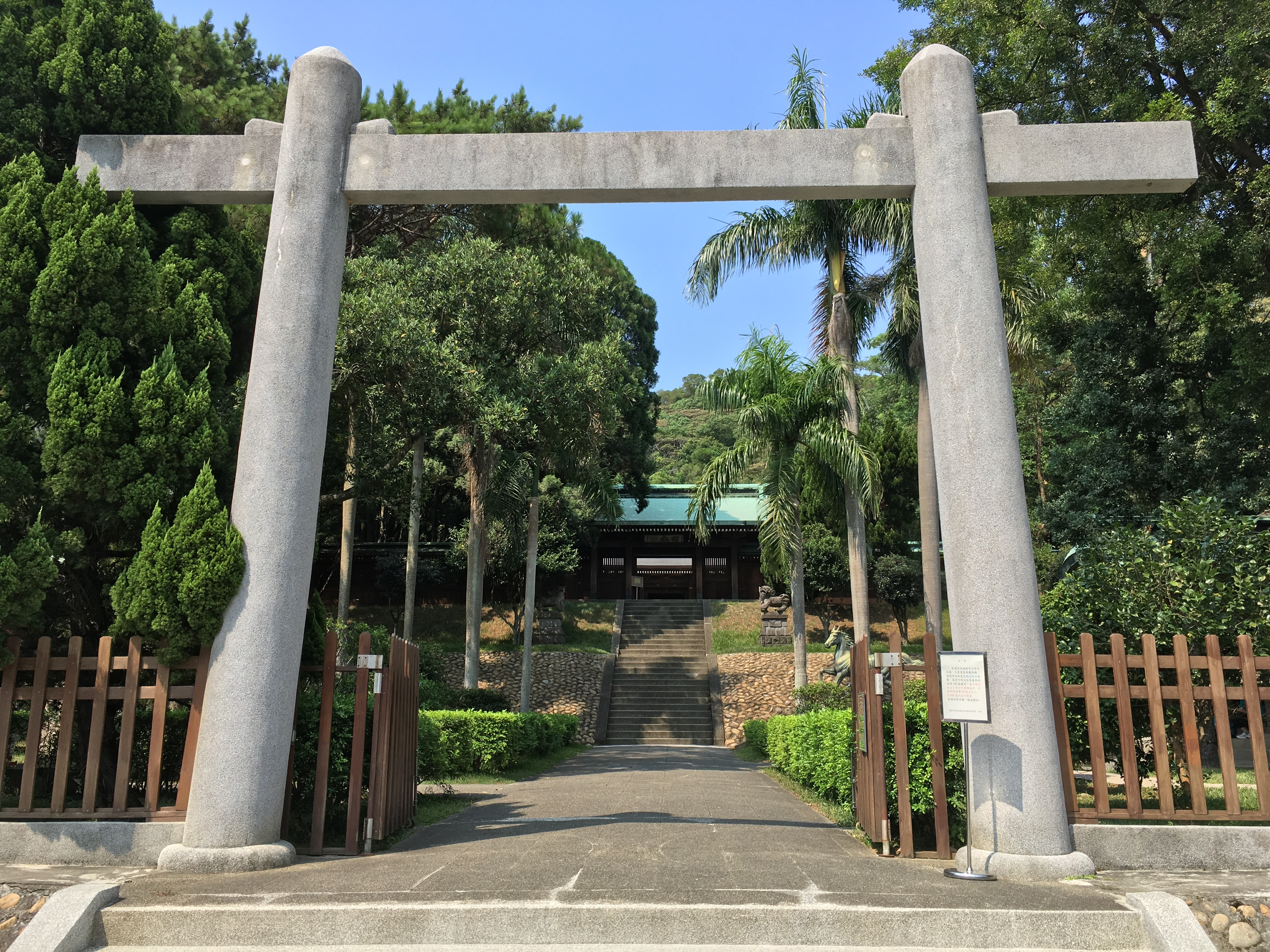
Torii

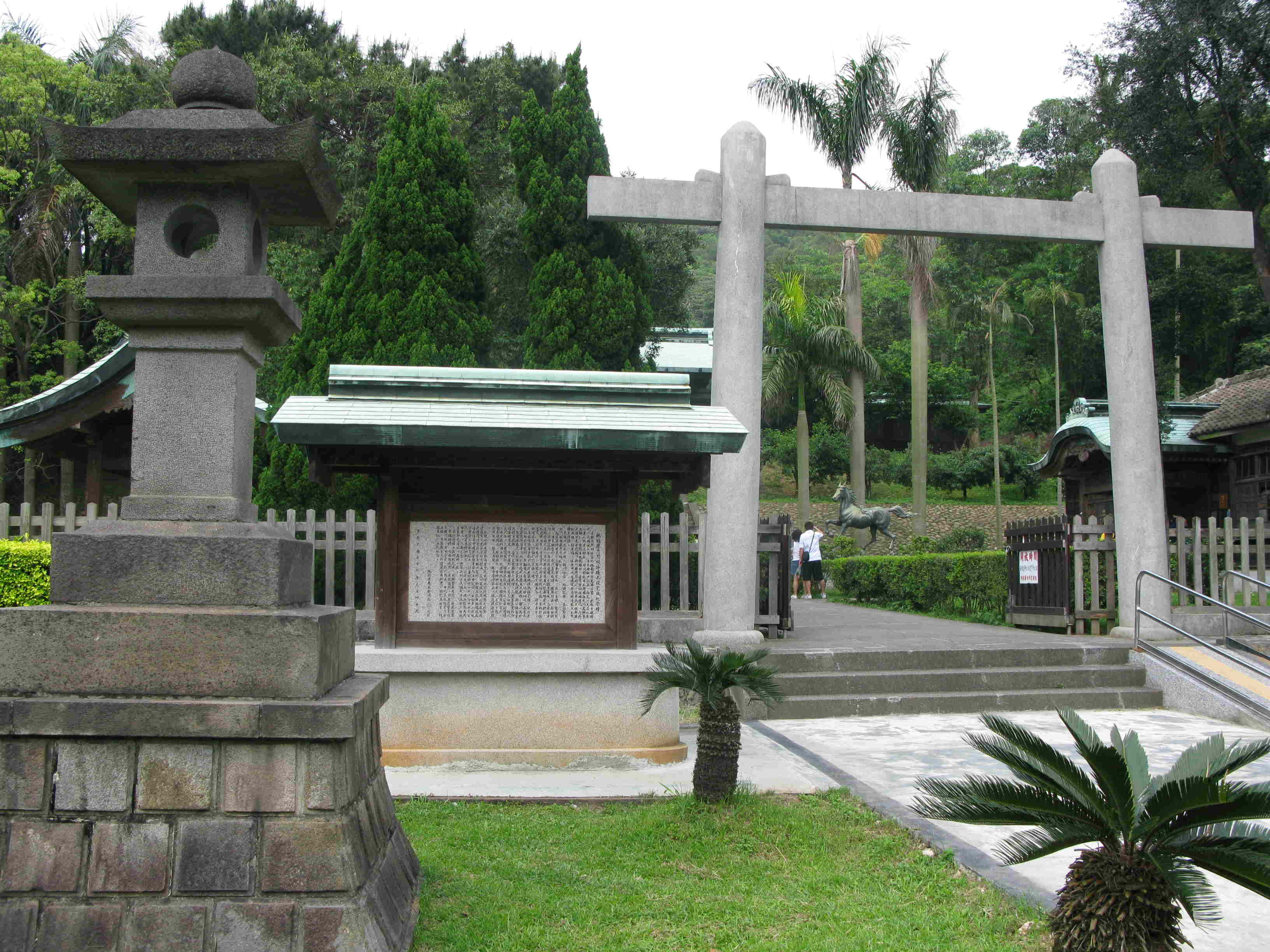
Gardens and entrance

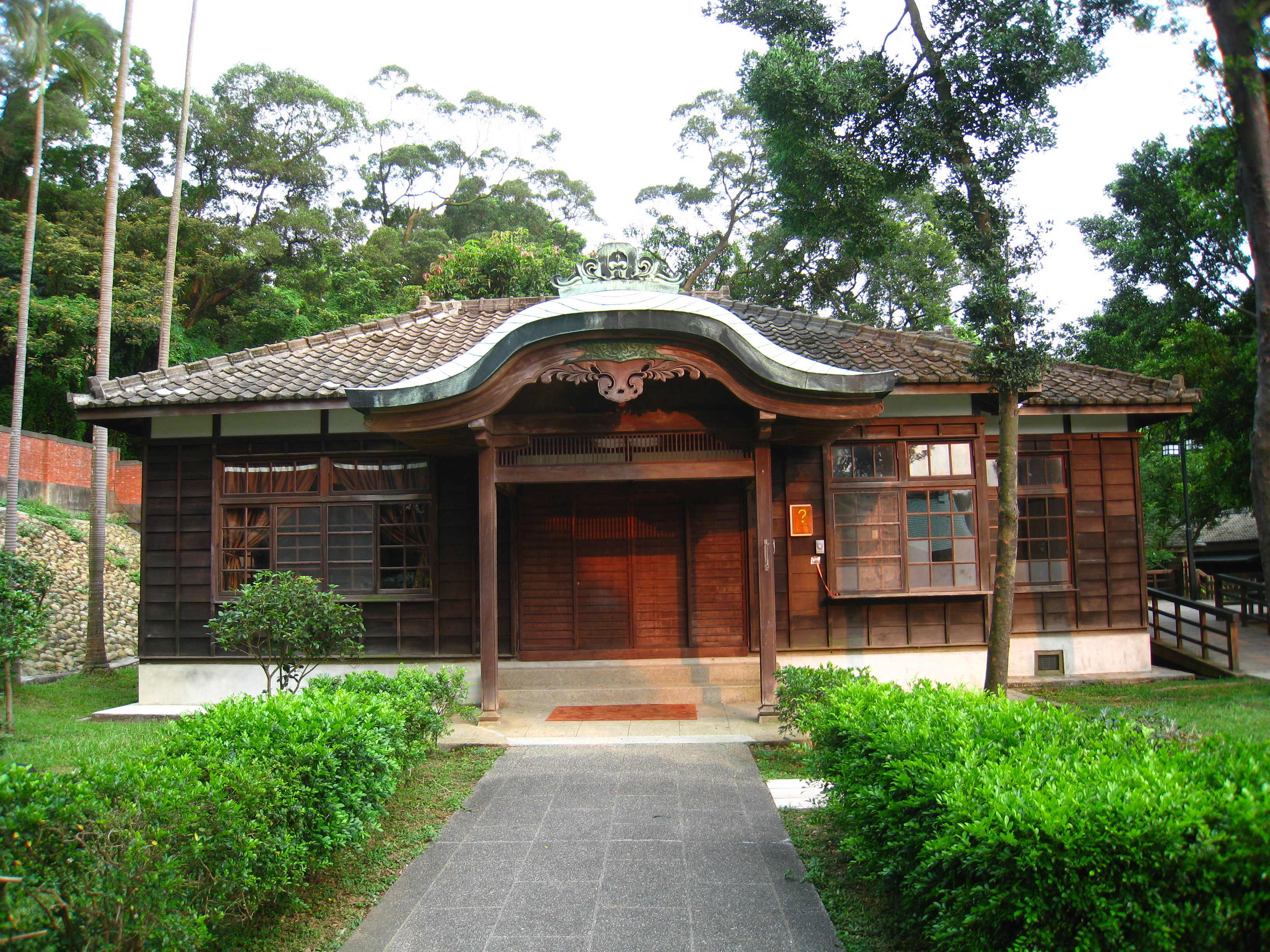
Administration office

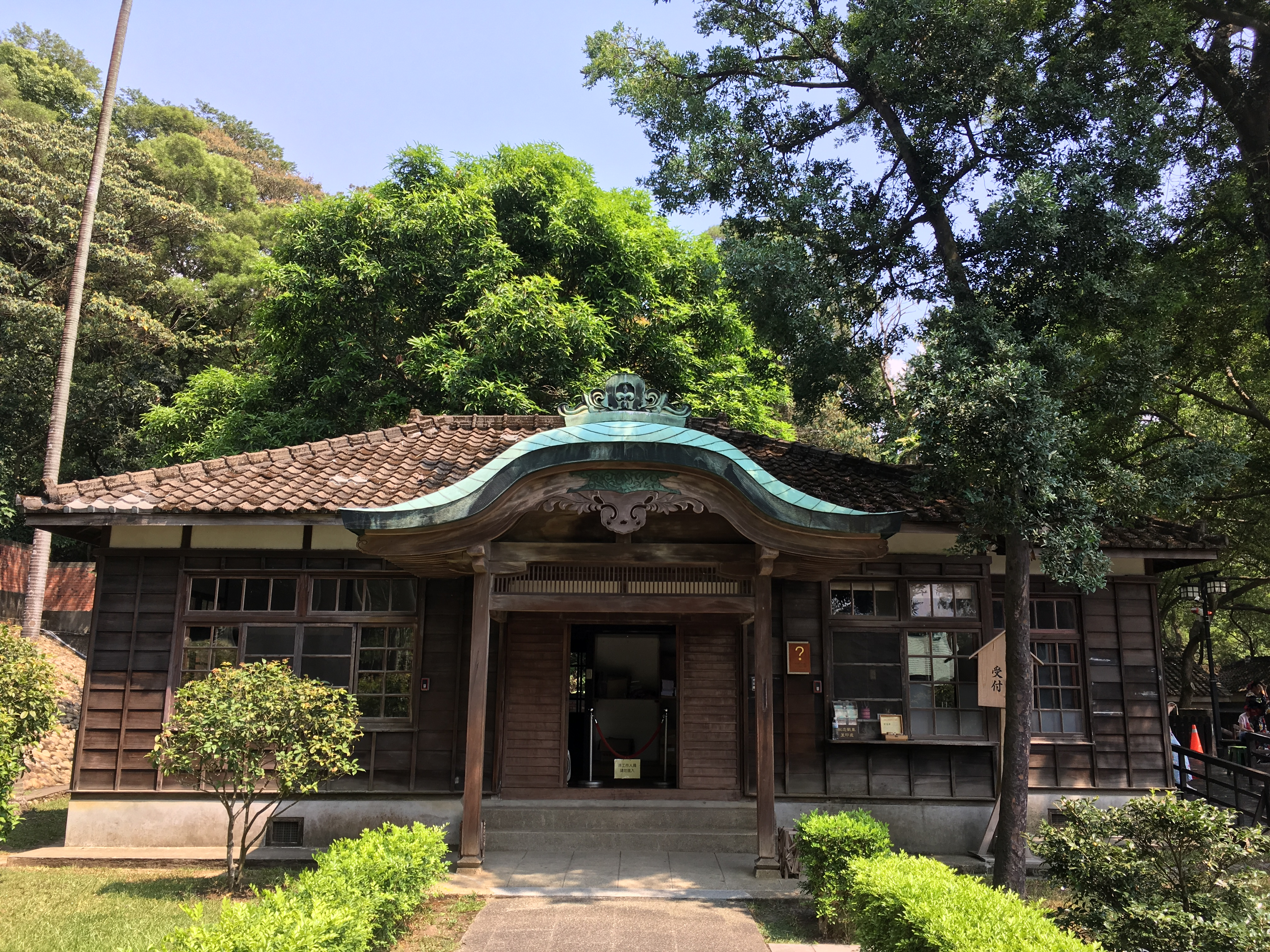
Administration office

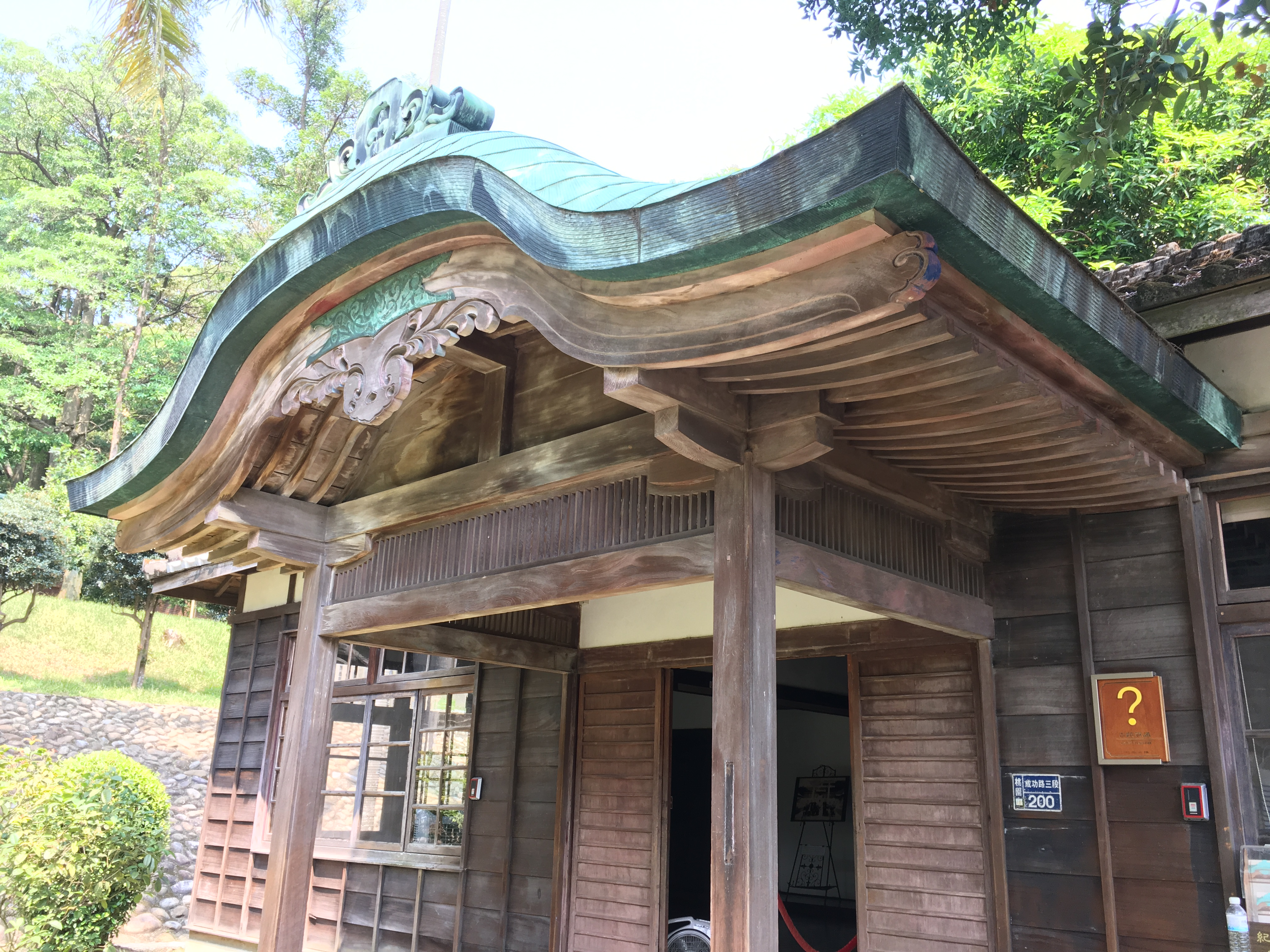
Administration office

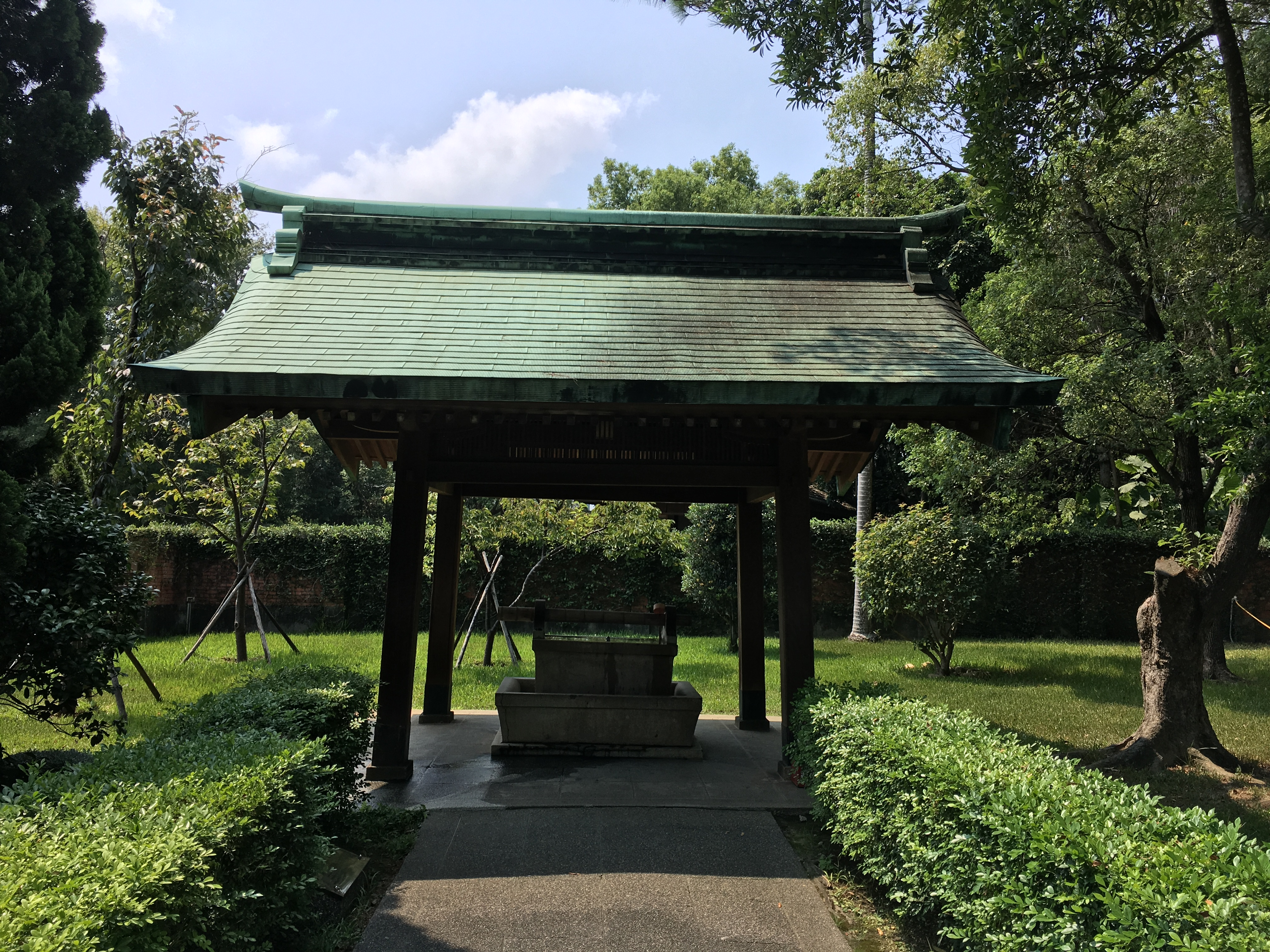
Chōzuya (手水舍, The Water Ablution Shelter)

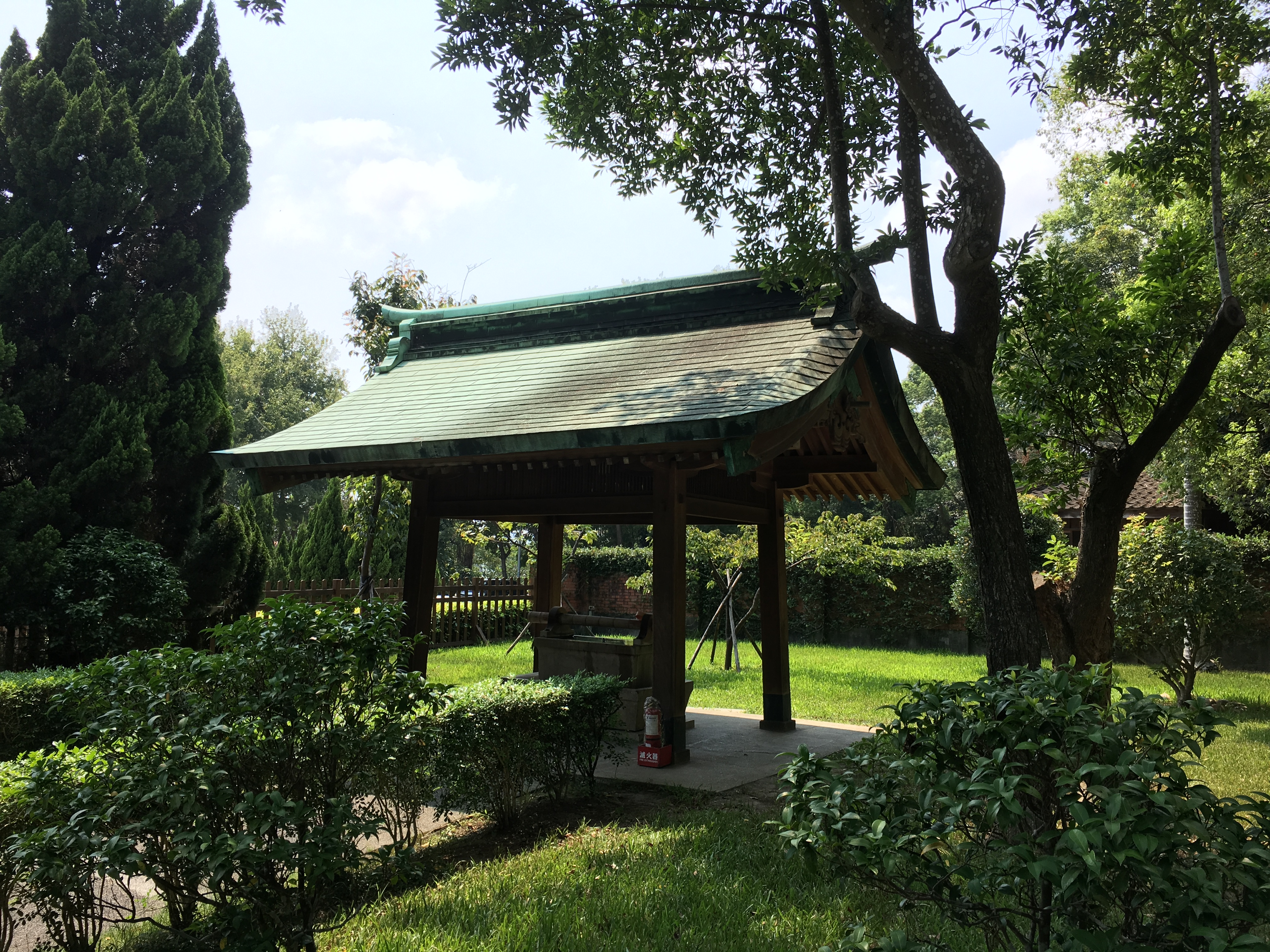
Chōzuya (手水舍, The Water Ablution Shelter)

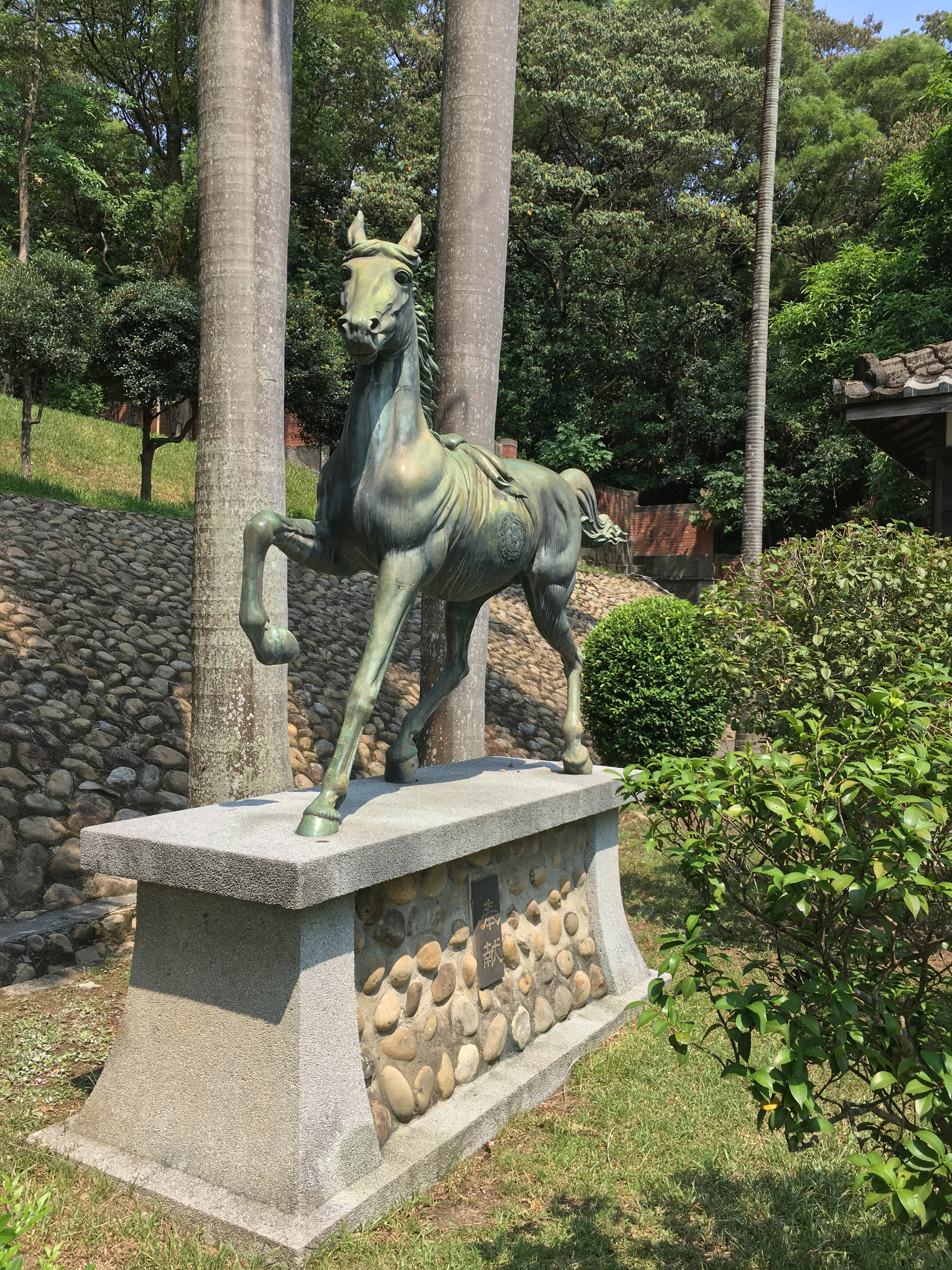
Bronze horse

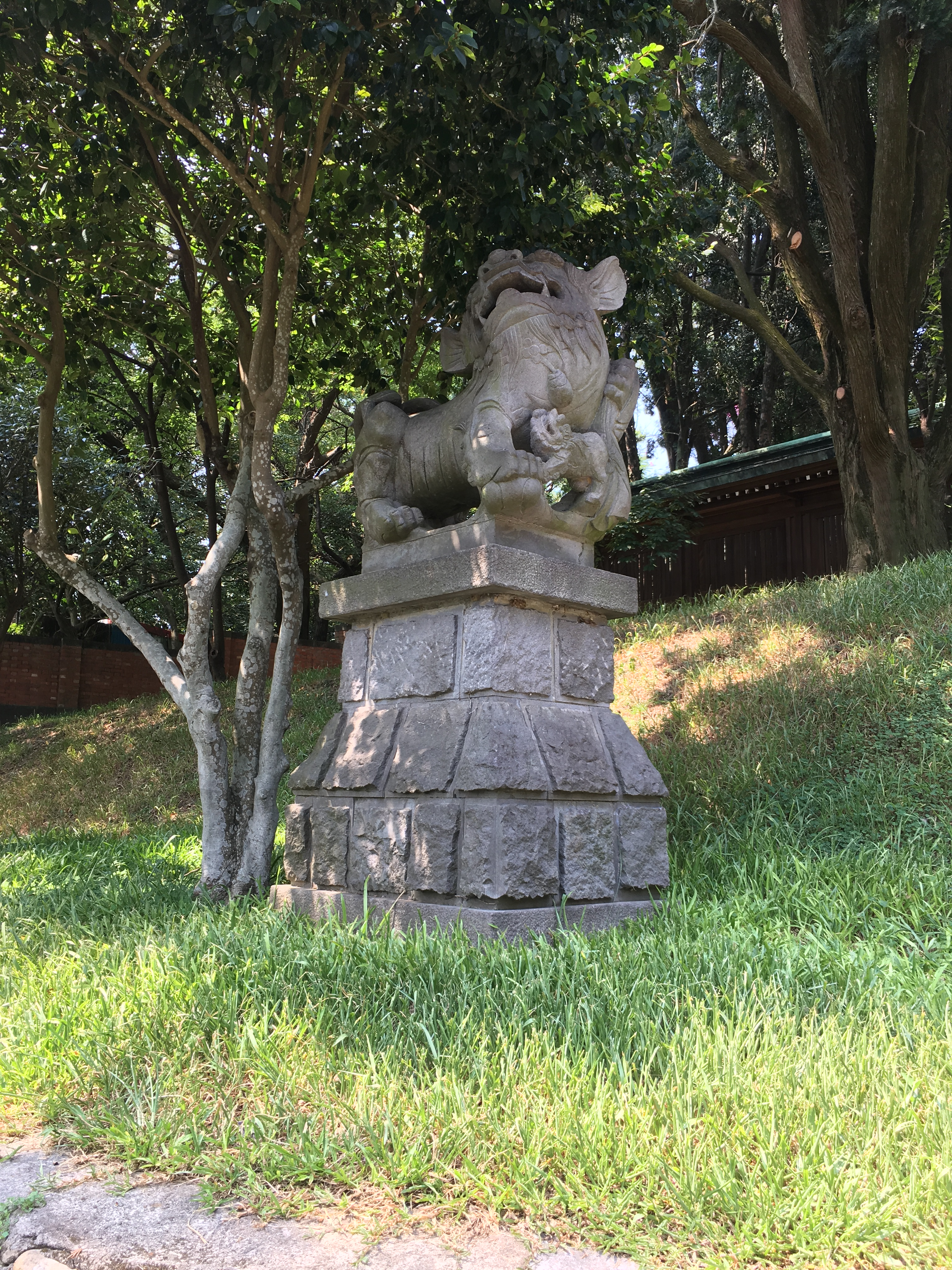
Komainu (狛犬)

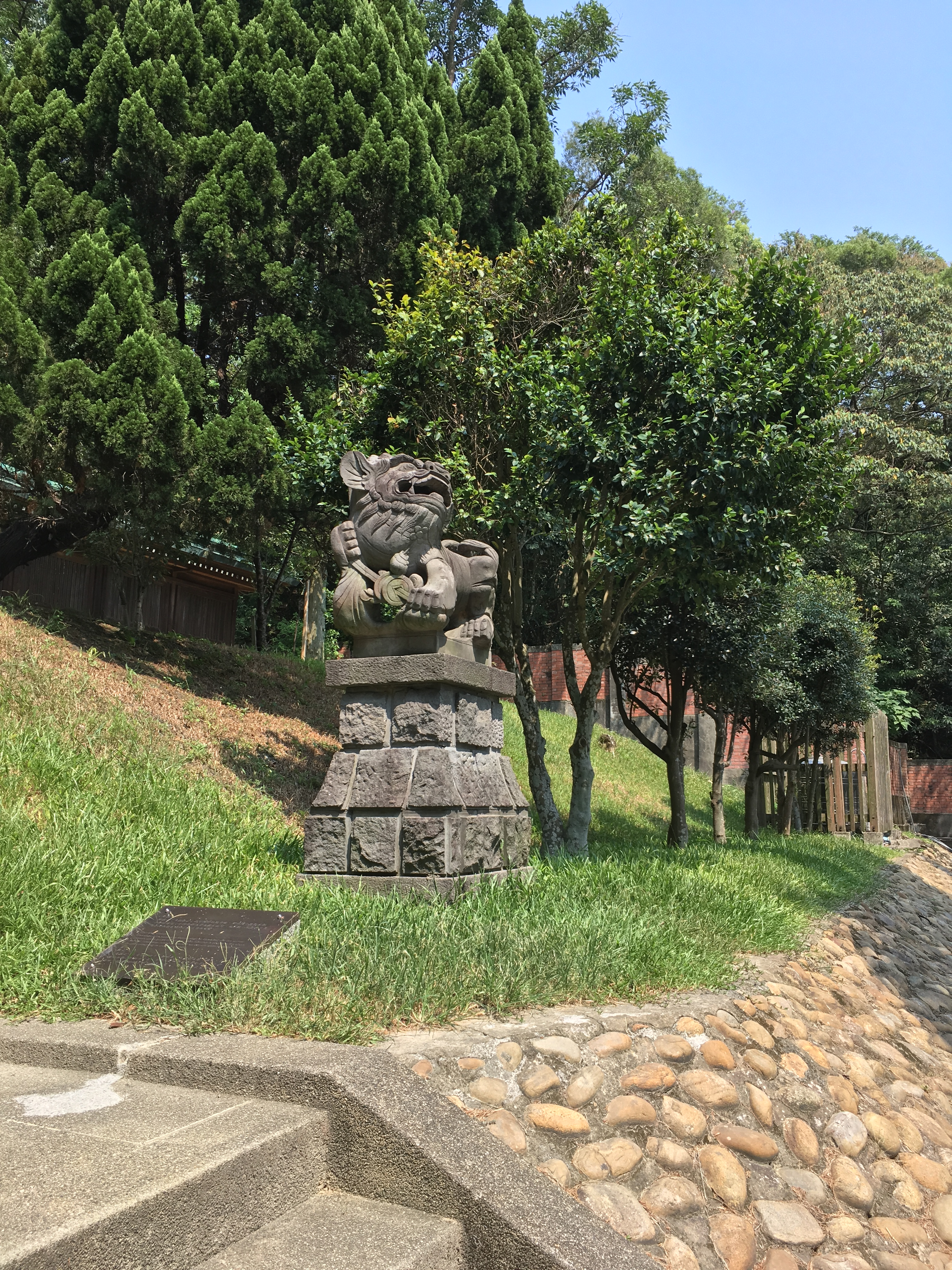
Komainu (狛犬)

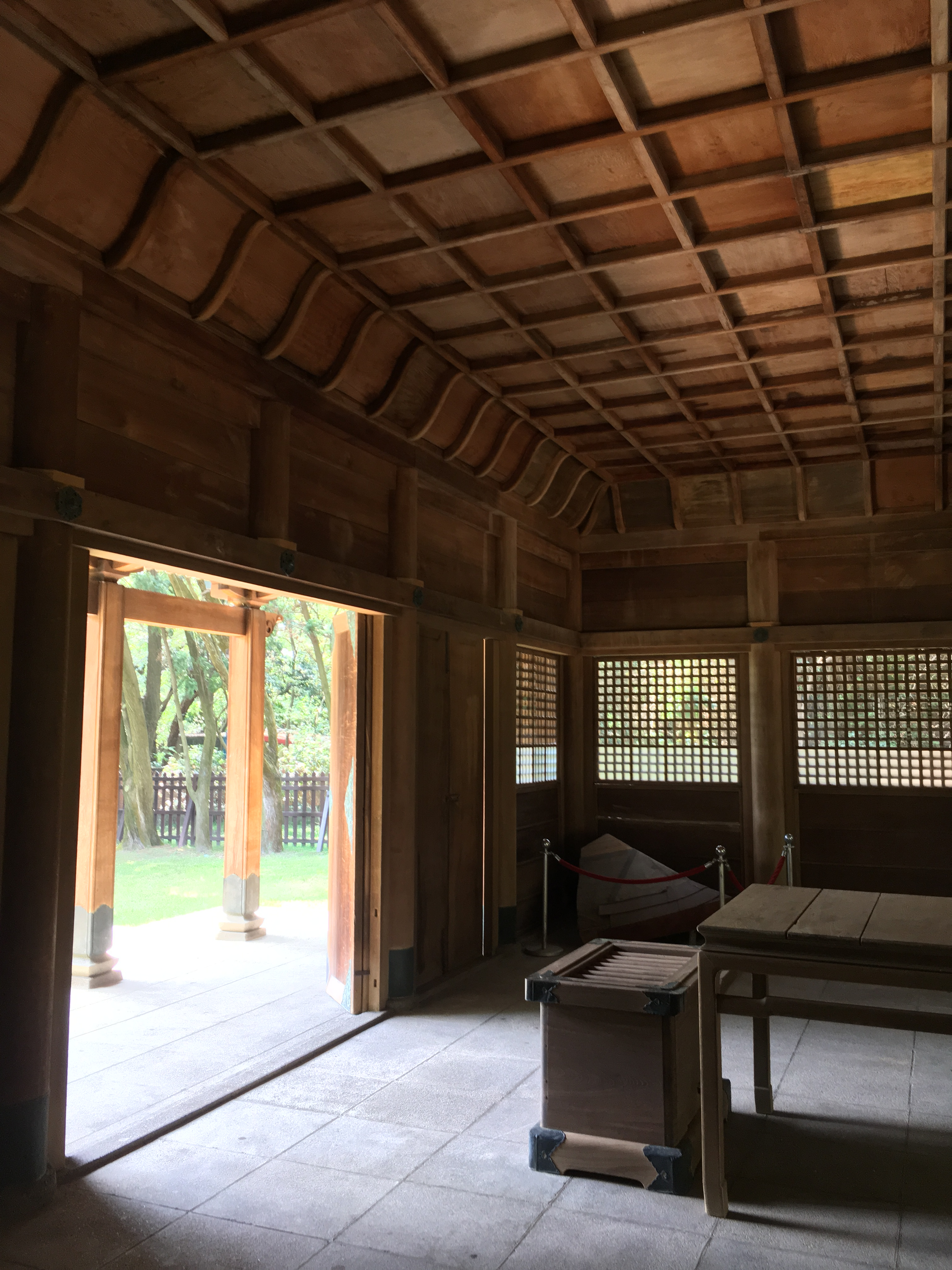
The roof of Haiden (拜殿, worship hall)

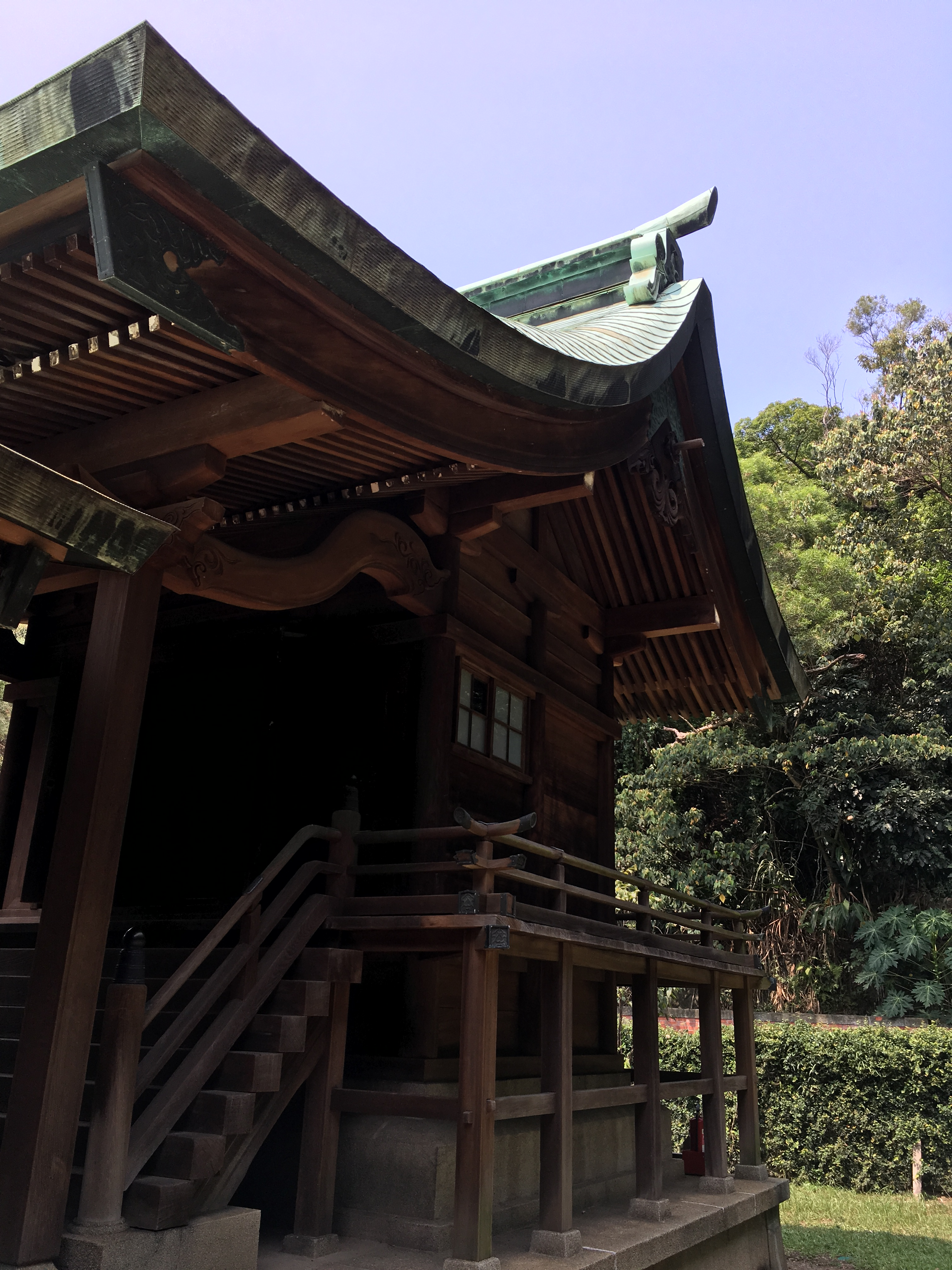
Honden (本殿, main hall)

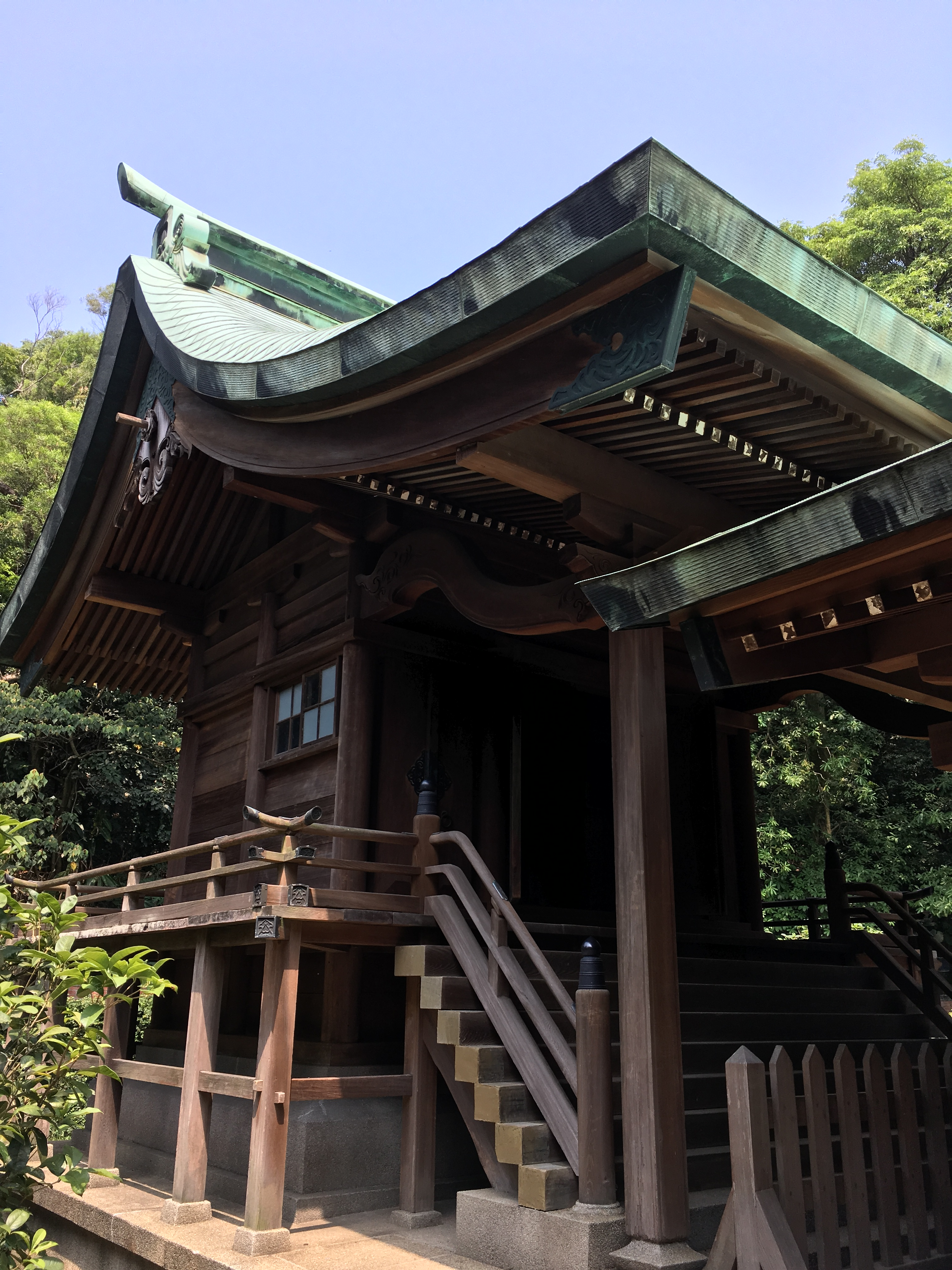
Honden (本殿, main hall)

== See also ==
- Furen Temple
- Xinwu Tianhou Temple
- Shinto shrine
