= Taoyuan City Government =

Government of Taoyuan City, Taiwan

Coordinates: 24.9934°N 121.3010°E

- 桃園市政府

Agency overview
- Formed: 25 December 2014
- Preceding agency: Taoyuan County Government
- Jurisdiction: Taoyuan City
- Headquarters: Taoyuan District
- Agency executive: Chang San-cheng (KMT), Magistrate; Deputy Magistrates
- Website: Official website

The Taoyuan City Government (TYCG; traditional Chinese: 桃園市政府; simplified Chinese: 桃园市政府; pinyin: Táoyuán Shì Zhèngfǔ) is the municipal government of Taoyuan, Taiwan.

== History ==
Originally established as Taoyuan County, the county was upgraded to Taoyuan City on 25 December 2014.

== Organization ==
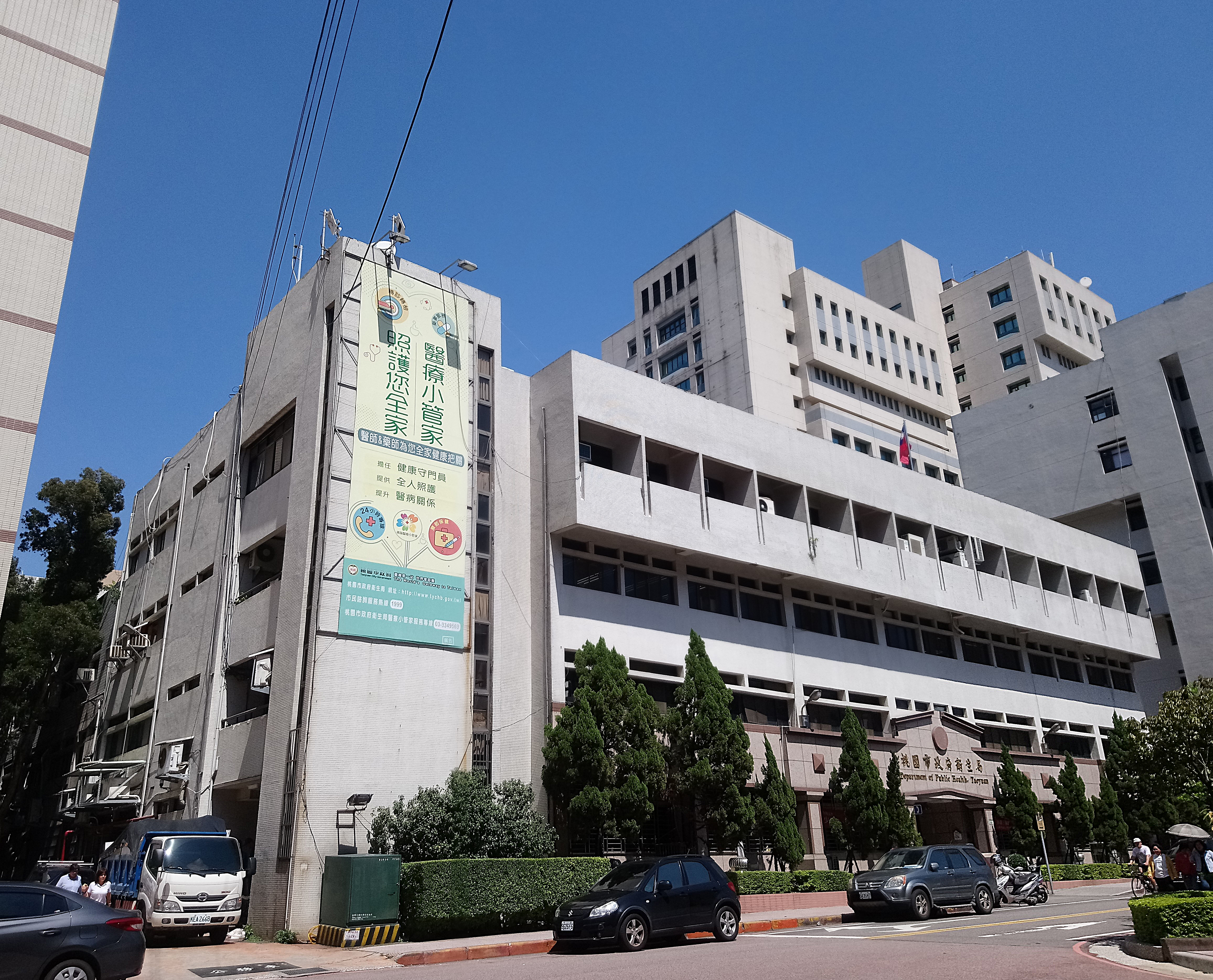
City Department of Public Health

- Department of Civil Affairs
- Department of Social Welfare
- Department of General Affairs
- Department of Legal Affairs
- Department of Transportation
- Fire Department
- Department of Public Works
- Department of Indigenous Affairs
- Department of Labor
- Department of Public Health
- Department of Education
- Department of Water Resources
- Department of Agriculture
- Department of Tourism
- Research and Evaluation Commission
- Department of Finance
- Department of Land Administration
- Department of Personnel
- Department of Governmental Ethics
- Department of Urban Development
- Department of Environmental Protection
- Police Department
- Department of Cultural Affairs
- Department of Economic Development
- Department of Hakka Affairs
- Department of Taxation
- Department of Public Information
- Department of Budget, Accounting and Statistics

== Access ==
Taoyuan City Hall is accessible within walking distance north west from Taoyuan Station of Taiwan Railway.

== See also ==
- Taoyuan City Council
