= Financial Star Building =

Skyscraper office building in Zhongli District of Taoyuan, Taiwan

Financial Star Building 世貿財星廣場
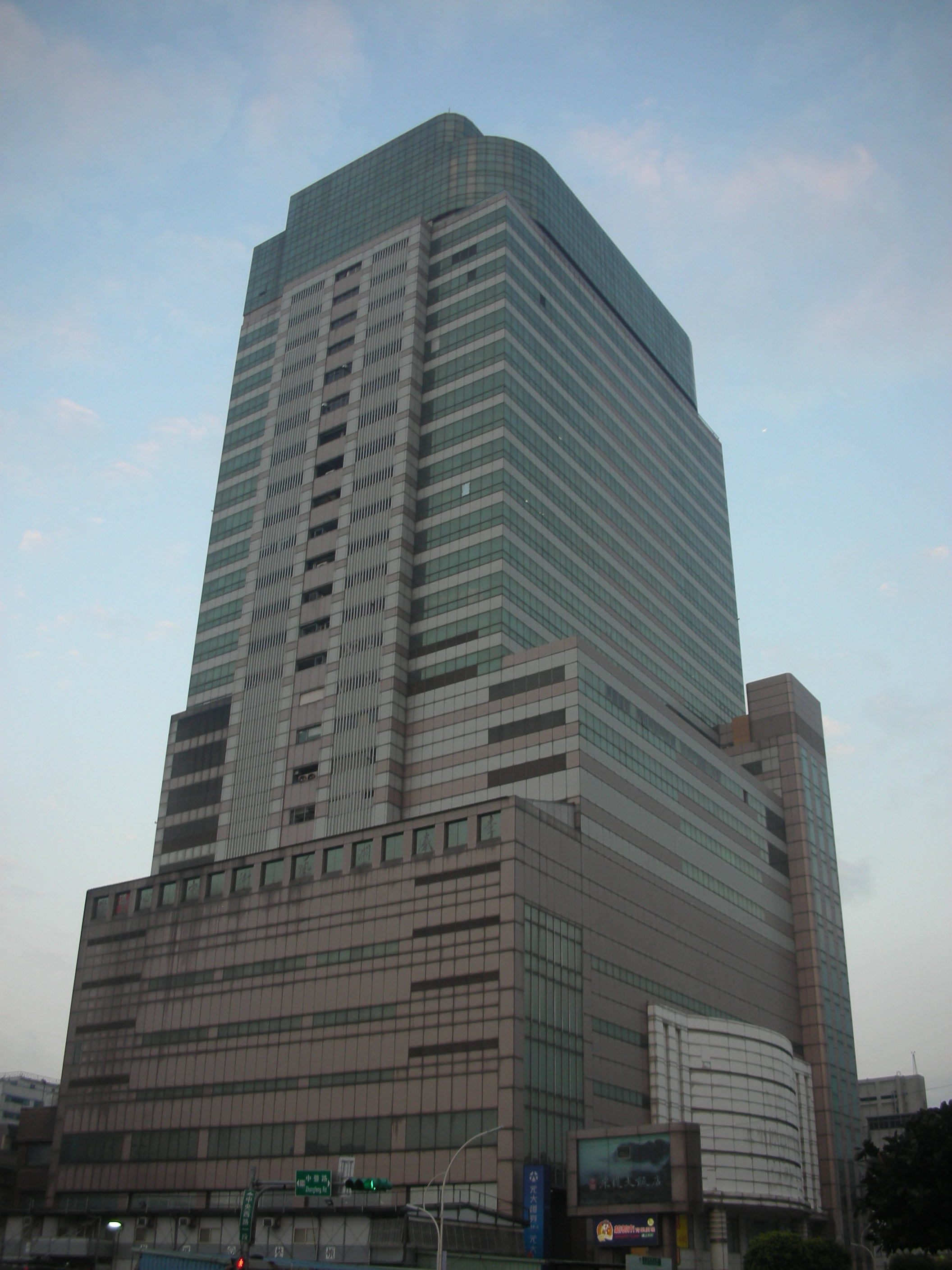

General information
- Type: Office, Retail
- Location: No. 120, Section 1, Zhongyang West Road, Zhongli District, Taoyuan, Taiwan
- Coordinates: 24.958753°N 121.220380°E
- Completed: 1993

Height
- Architectural: 123.7 m (406 ft)

Technical details
- Floor count: 30 (+4 basement levels)

The Financial Star Building (Chinese: 世貿財星廣場; pinyin: Shìmào cái xīng guǎngchǎng) is a 30-story, 123.7 m (406 ft) skyscraper office building completed in 1993 and located in Zhongli District, Taoyuan, Taiwan. It was the tallest building in Taoyuan city from its completion in 1993 until it was overtaken by ChungYuet Royal Landmark in 2012. Financial Star Building was also the first building to exceed 120 m (390 ft) in Taoyuan and was one of the earliest skyscrapers in the city. As of December 2020, the building is the 3rd tallest in Taoyuan City (after ChungYuet Royal Landmark and ChungYuet World Center). The building is near Zhongli railway station.

== See also ==
- List of tallest buildings in Asia
- List of tallest buildings in Taiwan
- List of tallest buildings in Taoyuan City
