= Taoyuan Zhongzheng Arts and Cultural Business District =

District in Taoyuan, Taiwan

Coordinates: 25°01′03″N 121°17′55″E

Taoyuan Zhongzheng Arts and Cultural Business District (Chinese: 桃園中正藝文特區) is located on the north side of Taoyuan District, Taoyuan City, Taiwan. The total area of Taoyuan Zhongzheng Arts and Cultural Business District is 15.65 hectares (38.7 acres). It was designed in the 2000s and developed from the 2010s onward, when Taoyuan City was still Taoyuan County. Taoyuan Zhongzheng Arts and Cultural Business District is one of the prime cultural and central business districts of Taoyuan City. Taoyuan's tallest buildings, such as ChungYuet Royal Landmark and ChungYuet World Center, are located within this area.

== Notable buildings ==
- Taoyuan Arts Center
- ChungYuet Royal Landmark (153 m (502 ft))
- Taoyuan Main Public Library
- ChungYuet World Center (150 m (490 ft))
- ChungYuet Global Business Building (117.3 m (385 ft))

== Entertainment facilities ==
- Chung Mao Plaza
- Geleven Plaza
- Taoyuan Main Public Library

== Transportation ==
=== Rail ===
- Taoyuan Metro
  - Green Line (under construction): Daxing W. Rd. Intersection and Taoyuan P. Arts Center(TPAC)

=== Road ===
- Taoyuan Interchange
- Southern Taoyuan Interchange

== Gallery ==
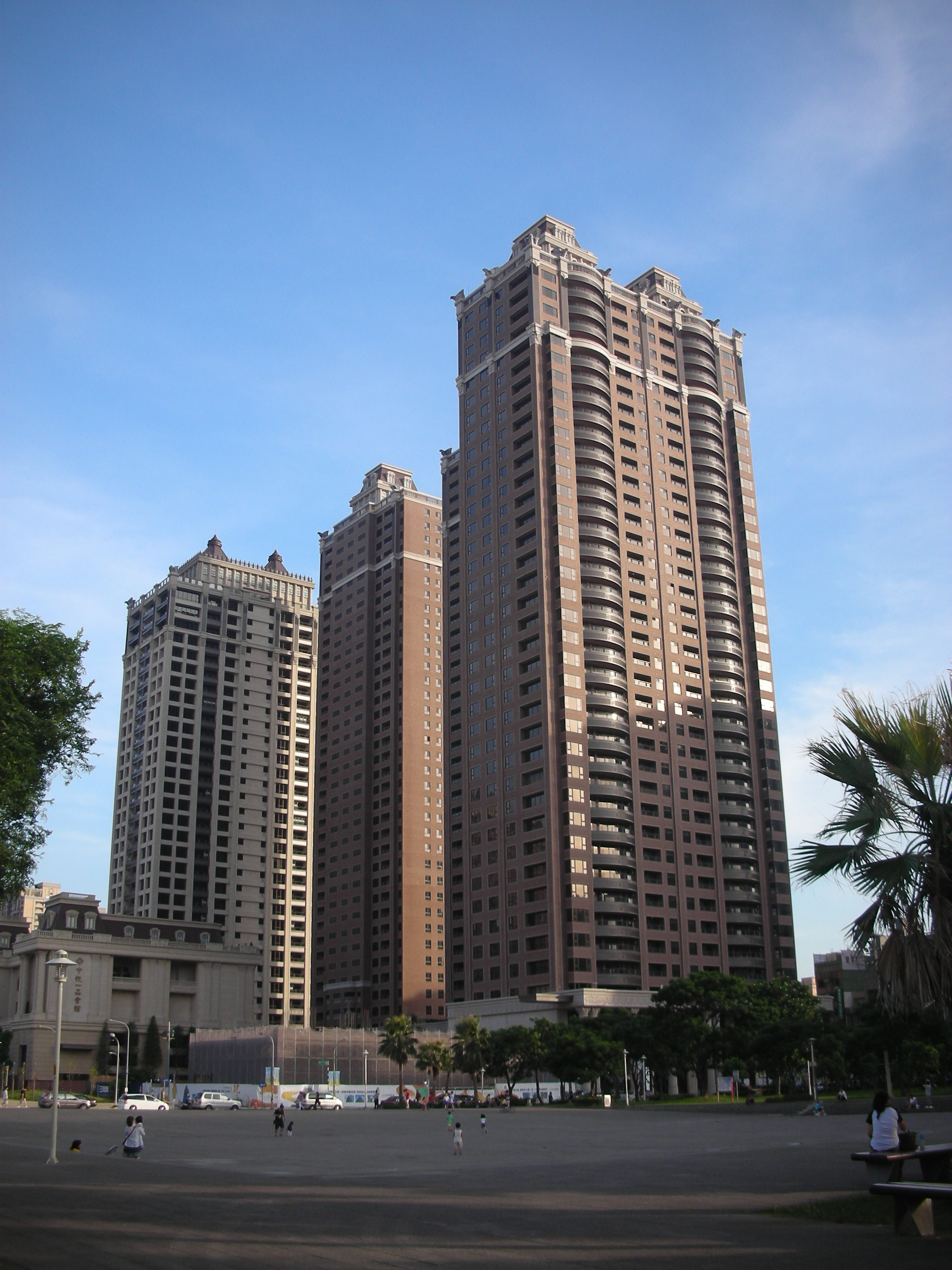
ChungYuet Royal Landmark - tallest building in Taoyuan

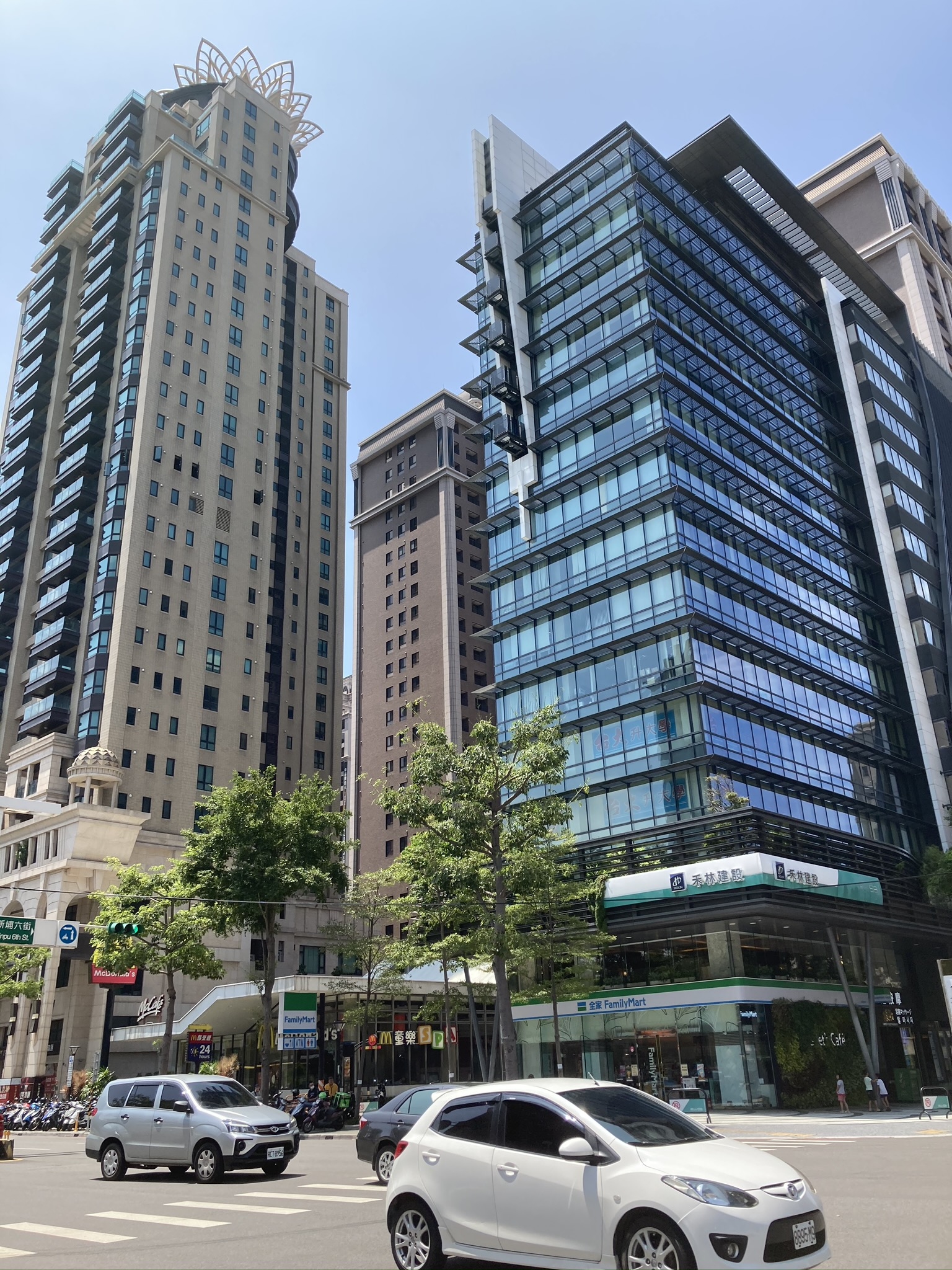

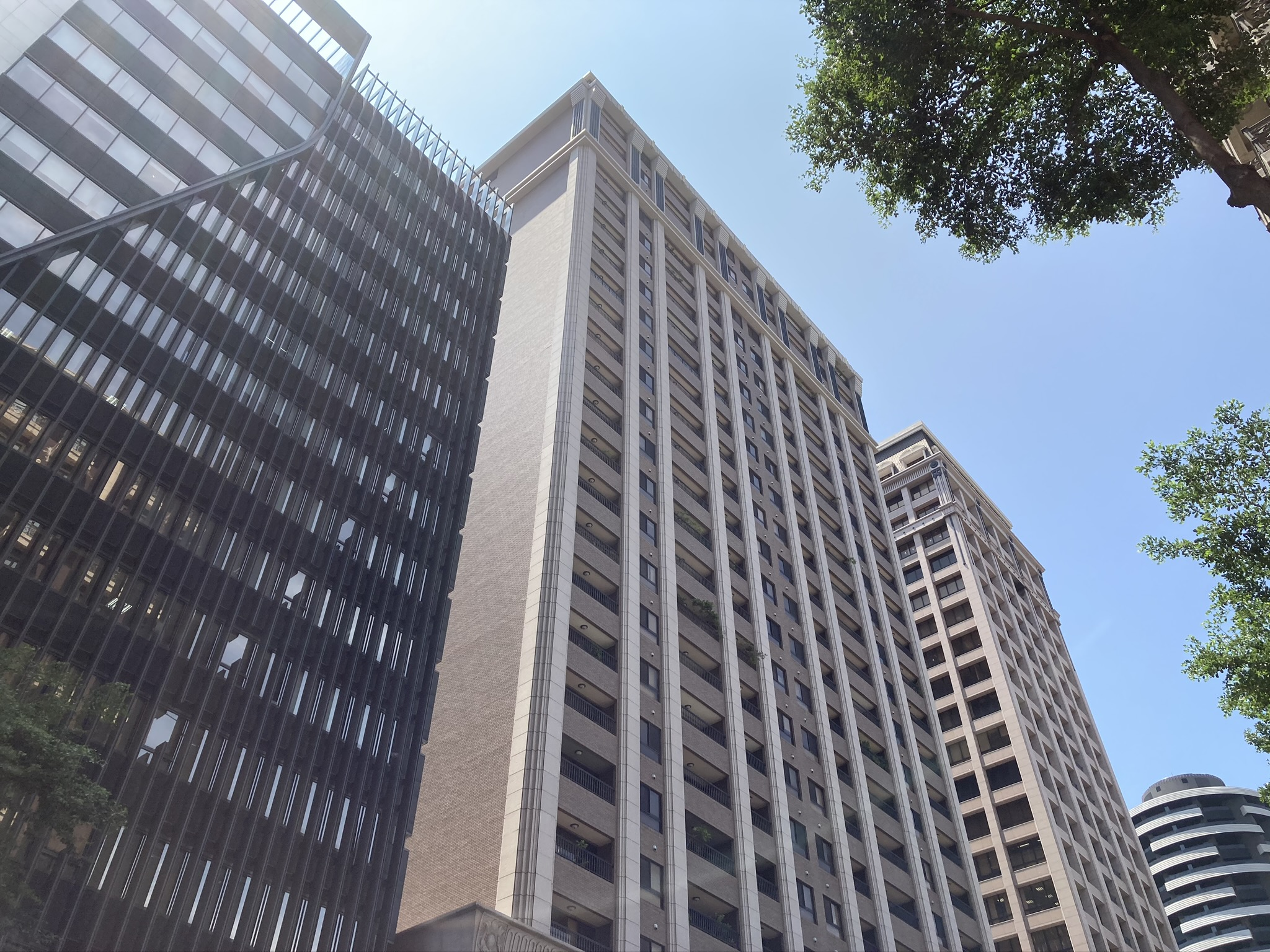

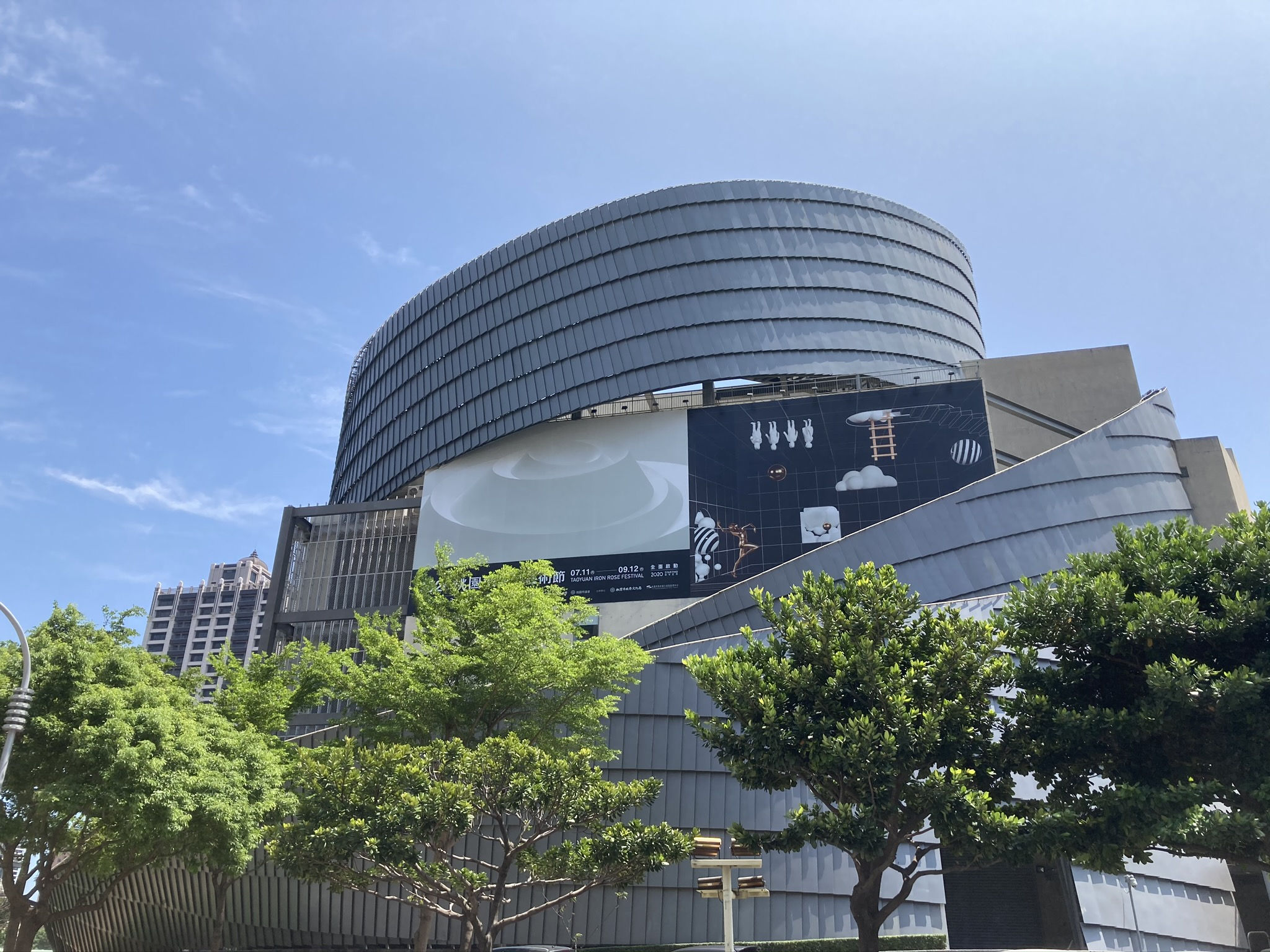

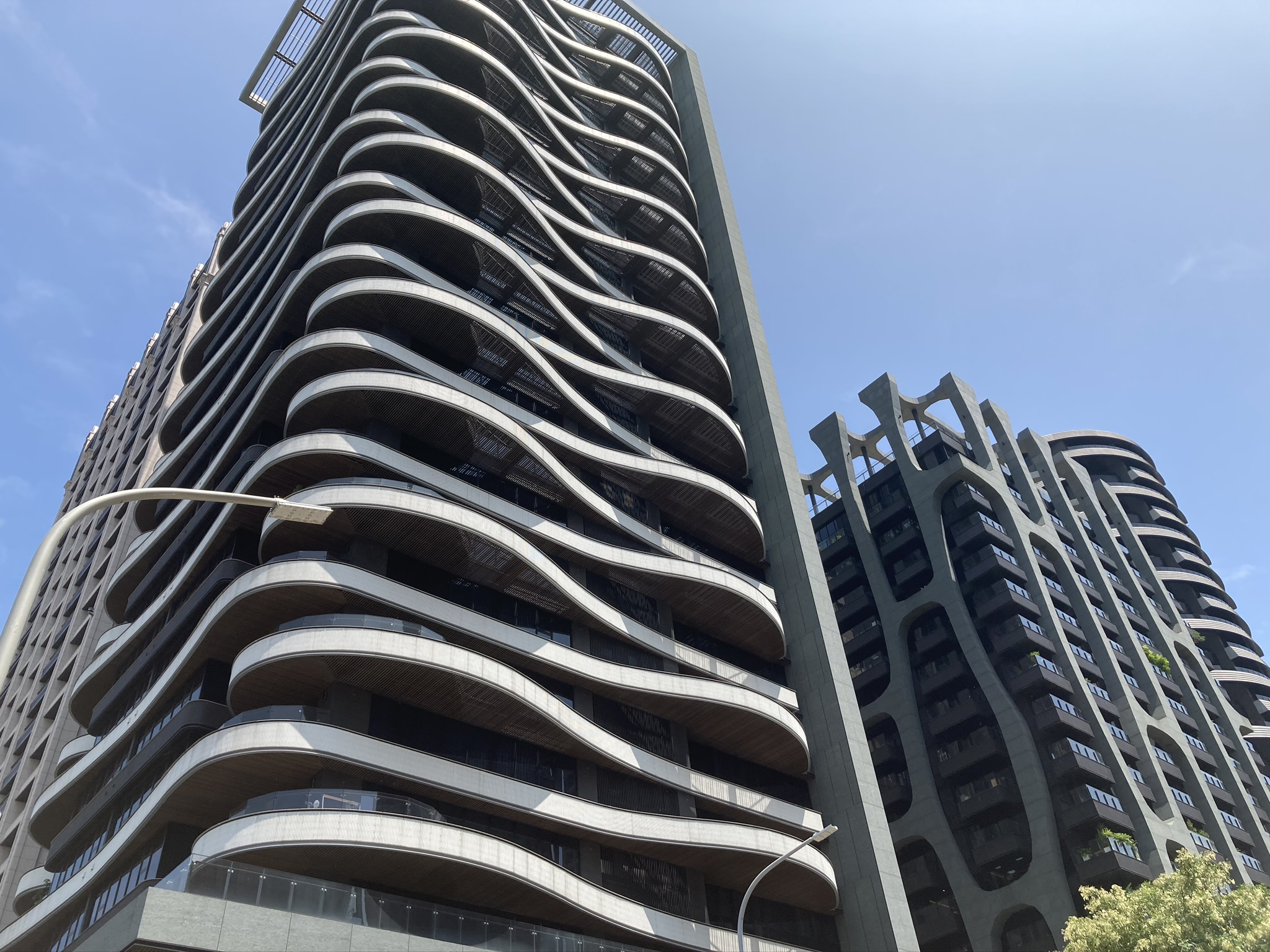

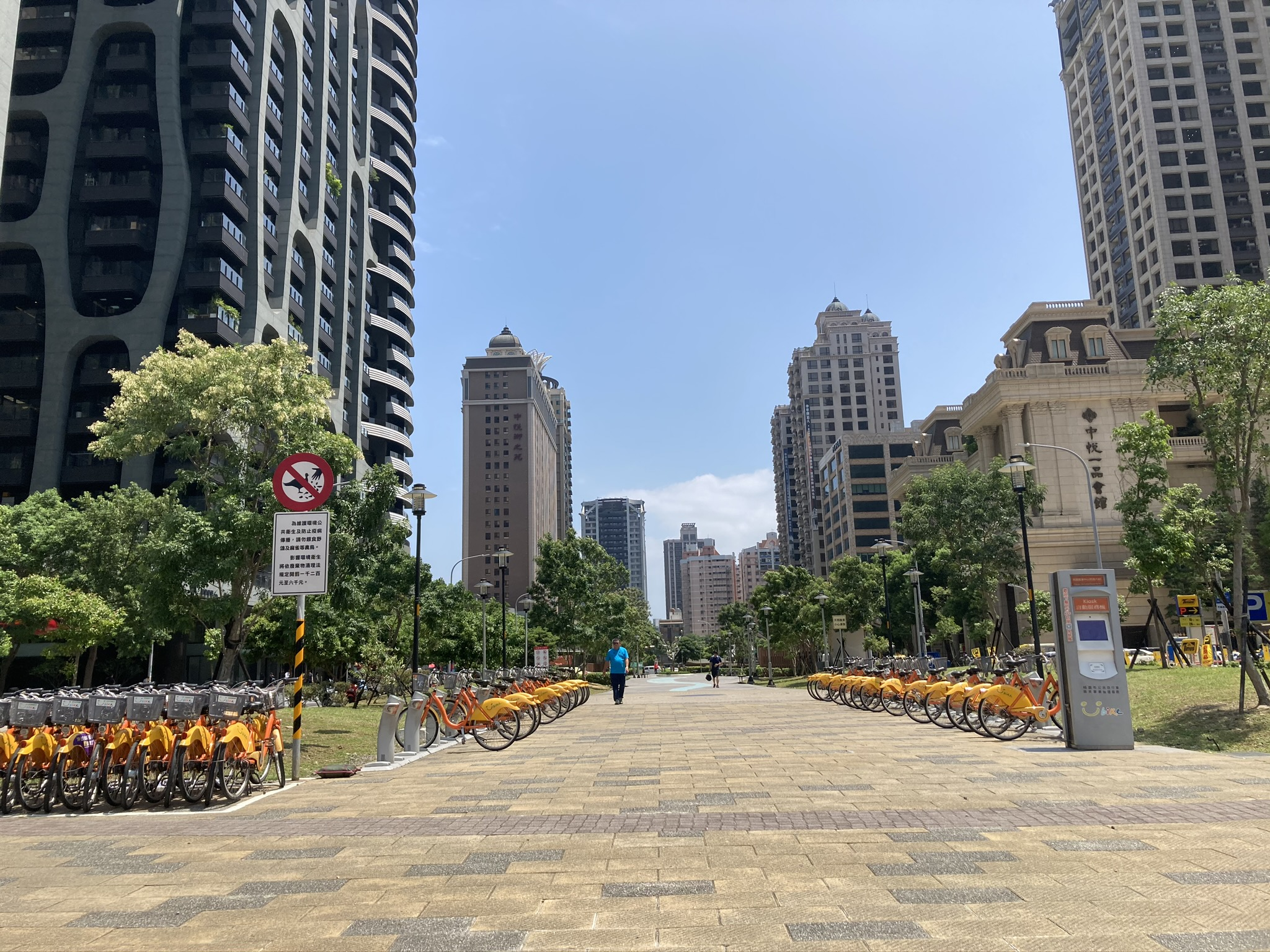

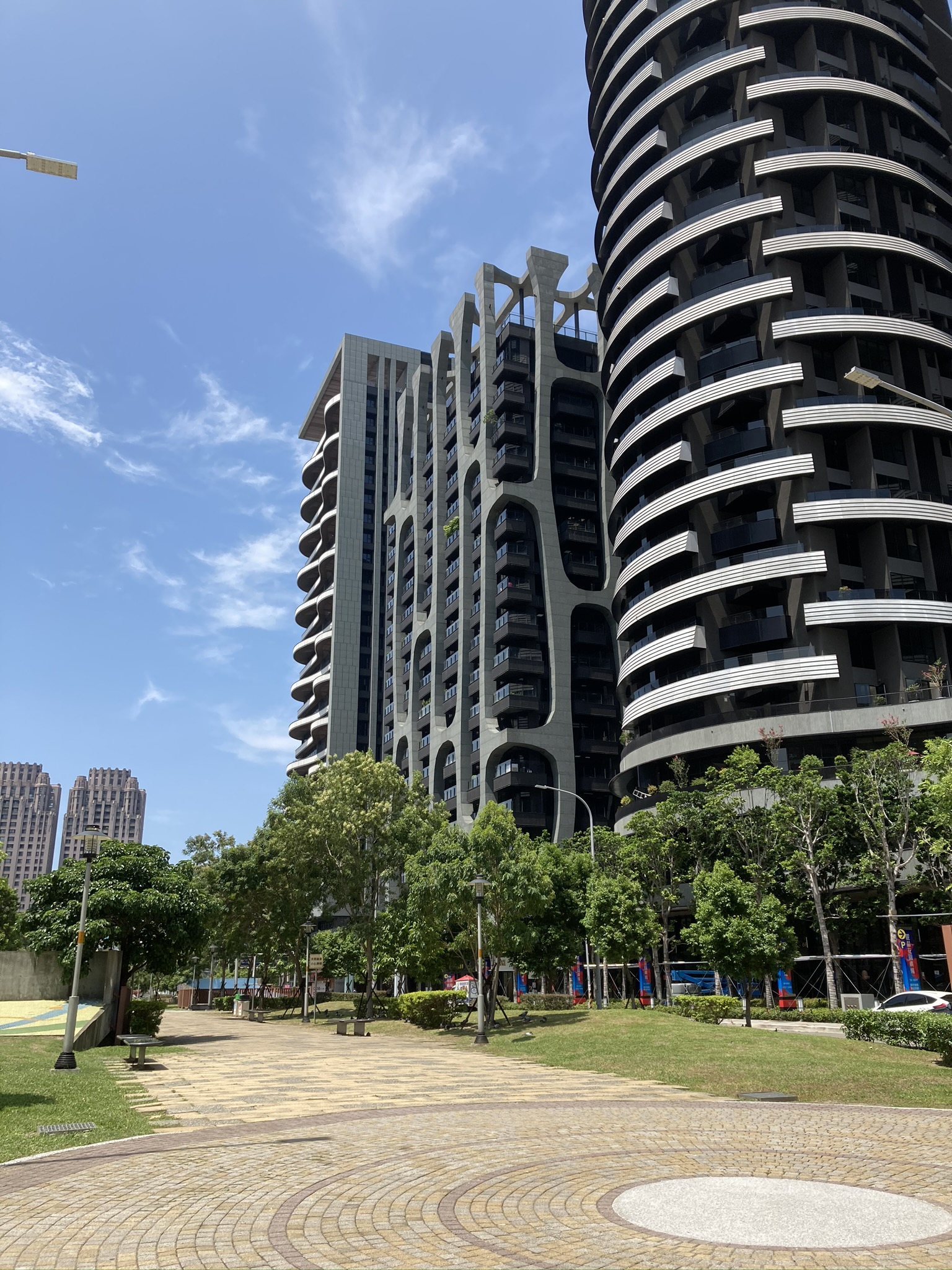

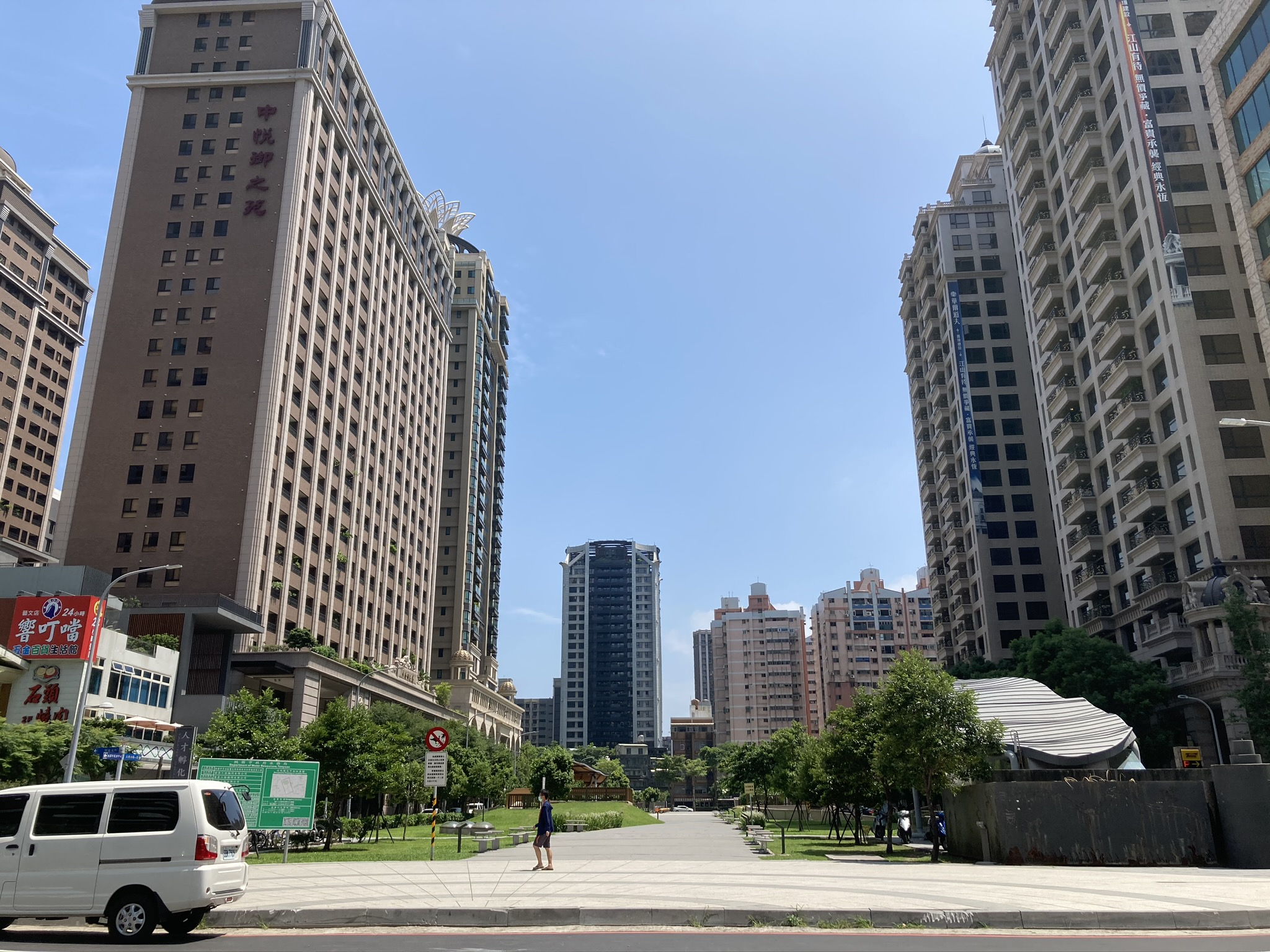

== See also ==
- Xinyi Planning District
- Xinban Special District
- Qingpu Special District
- List of tallest buildings in Taoyuan City
- Urban planning in Taiwan
