= Water Resources Agency =

Government agency of the Republic of China

Coordinates: 24°09′15.7″N 120°38′02.2″E

- 經濟部水利署
- Logo of the Water Resources Agency

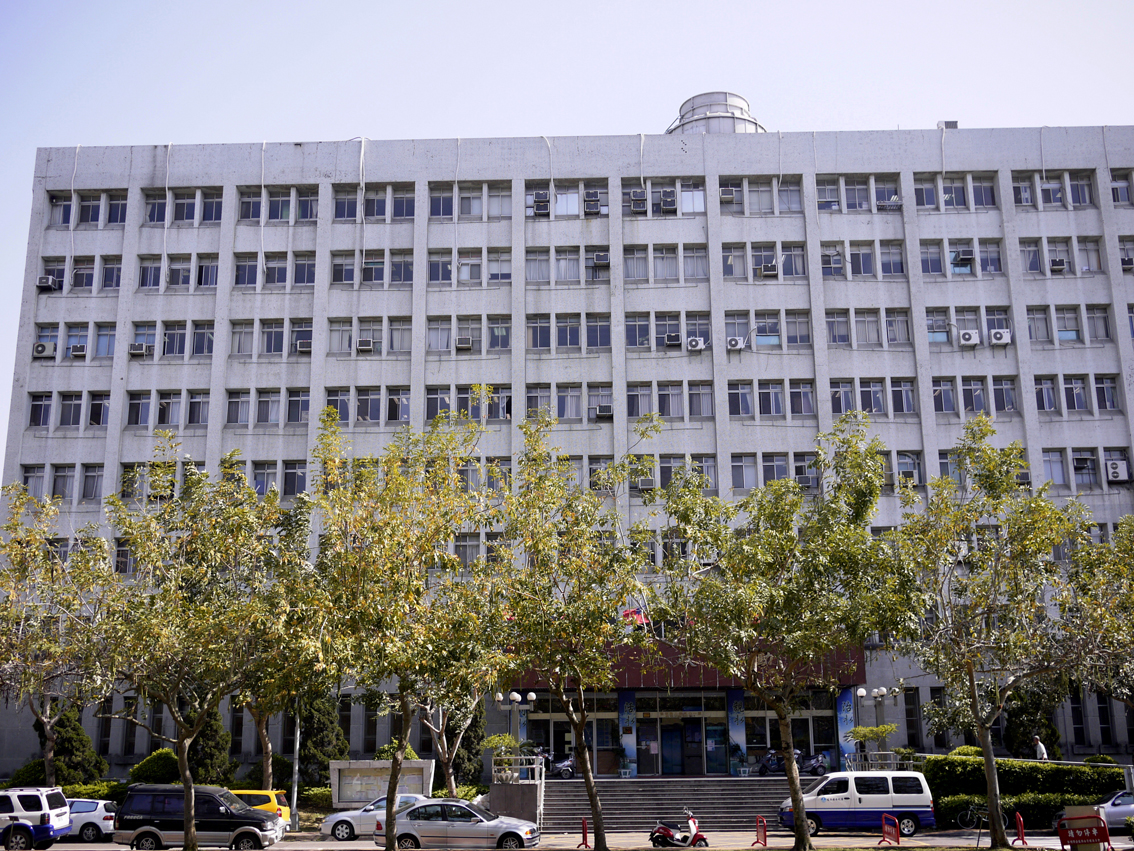
- Headquarters of the Water Resources Agency

Agency overview
- Formed: 1946
- Preceding agencies: Ministry of Water Conservancy; Water Conservancy Agency; Water Resources Bureau; Water Conservancy Agency
- Headquarters: Nantun, Taichung, Taiwan
- Agency executive: Lai Chien-hsin, Director-General
- Parent agency: Ministry of Economic Affairs
- Website: www.wra.gov.tw

The Water Resources Agency (WRA; traditional Chinese: 經濟部水利署; simplified Chinese: 经济部水利署; pinyin: Jīngjì Bù Shuǐlì Shǔ) is the administrative agency of the Ministry of Economic Affairs of Taiwan responsible for water-related affairs.

== History ==
The creation of Water Resources Agency dated back to the Ministry of Water Conservancy of the central government of the Republic of China in 1946, and the provincial water agencies under the Taiwan Provincial Government in 1947.

For the central government, the ministry was first reduced and merged into the Water Conservancy Agency of the Ministry of Economic Affairs (MOEA) in 1948. It was then curtailed to become the Water Conservancy Department of the MOEA in 1949. Through further mergers and formation, the Water Resources Bureau of the MOEA was created in 1996.

For the provincials water agencies, they underwent reorganization and partial mergers to form the Water Conservancy Bureau of the Department of Construction of the provincial government in 1947. After the streamlining of the provincial government, the bureau went through further mergers and was transferred under the control of the central government in 1999. It became the Water Conservancy Agency of the MOEA.

In 2002, with the combination of several agencies under the MOEA, including the Water Resources Bureau, Water Conservancy Agency and Taipei Water Resource Specific Committee, the Water Resources Agency of MOEA was created.

== Organizational structure ==
- Planning Division
- Hydrology Division
- Management Division
- River and Coast Division
- Conservation Division
- Construction Division
- Water Administration Division
- Land Management Division
- Information Management
- River Survey Team
- Water Hazard Mitigation Center
- Secretariat
- Personnel Office
- Budget, Accounting and Statistics Office
- Civil Service Ethics Office
- Water Resources Office
- River Management Office
- Taipei Water Management Office
- Water Resources Planning Institute

== See also ==
- Ministry of Economic Affairs (Taiwan)
- Taoyuan Water Conservancy Composite Tower
