= Taoyuan Arts Center =

Arts center in Taoyuan District, Taoyuan City, Taiwan

- 桃園展演中心
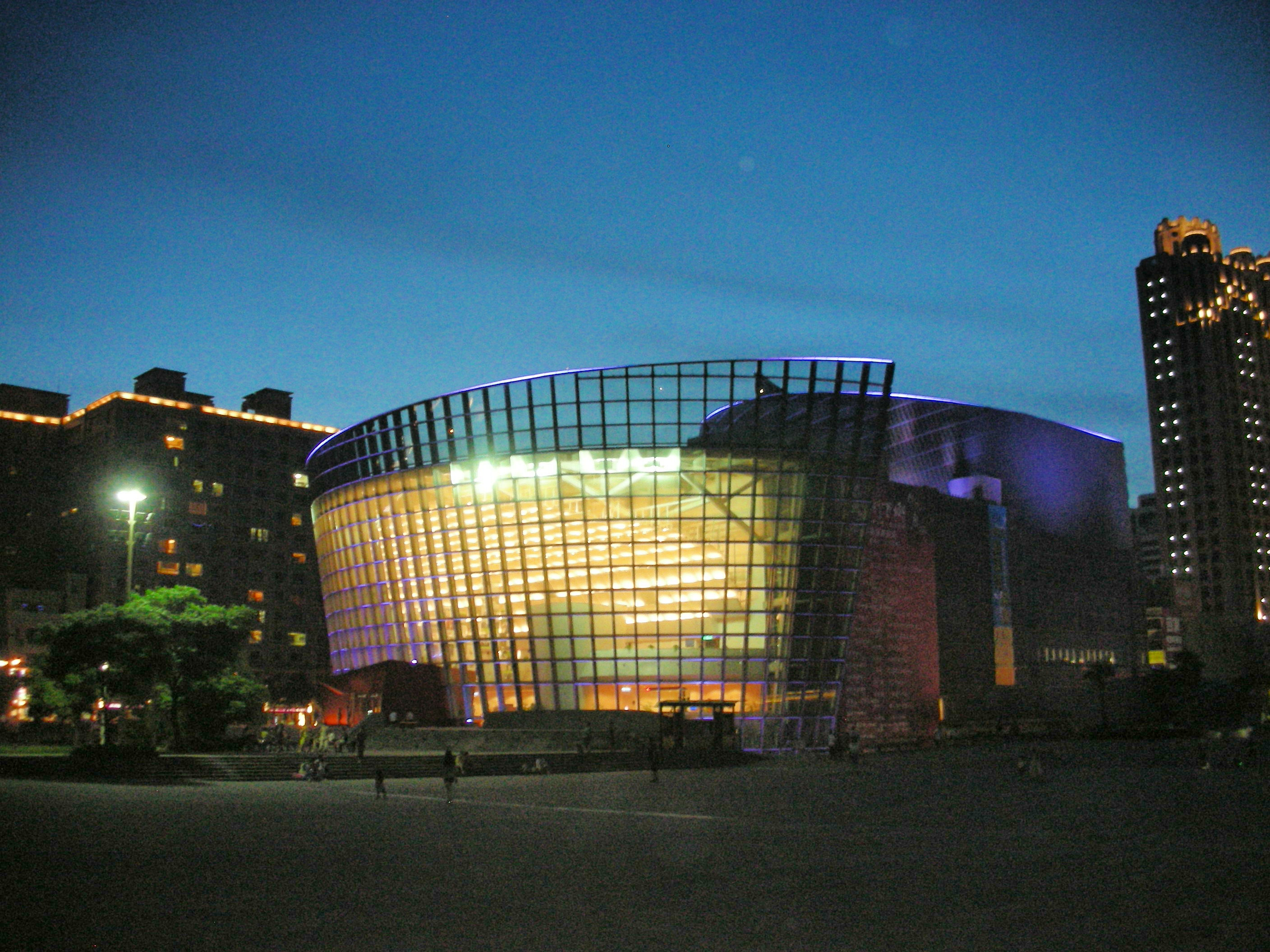
- Interactive map of Taoyuan Arts Center
- Location: Taoyuan District, Taoyuan City, Taiwan
- Coordinates: 25°01′02.9″N 121°17′54.9″E

Construction
- Opened: 2010

Website
- www.afmc.gov.tw

The Taoyuan Arts Center (traditional Chinese: 桃園展演中心; simplified Chinese: 桃园展演中心; pinyin: Táoyuán Zhǎnyǎn Zhōngxīn) is a performance center located in Taoyuan District, Taoyuan City, Taiwan. It is situated in the Taoyuan Zhongzheng Arts and Cultural Business District.

== History ==
The center was opened in 2010.

== Architecture ==
The building was constructed using sleek aluminum alloy design that reaches into the sky, with glass windows stacked in a lattice-style layering. It has a floor area of 2,764 m^{2}.

== Notable events ==
- 47th Golden Horse Awards

== Transportation ==
The center is accessible by walking approximately 3.5km (2.2 miles) northwest of Taoyuan Station of the Taiwan Railways Administration.

== See also ==
- List of tourist attractions in Taiwan
- Taoyuan Zhongzheng Arts and Cultural Business District
