= Taoyuan Water Conservancy Composite Tower =

Skyscraper office building in Taoyuan city, Taiwan

Taoyuan Water Conservancy Composite Tower 桃園水利綜合大樓
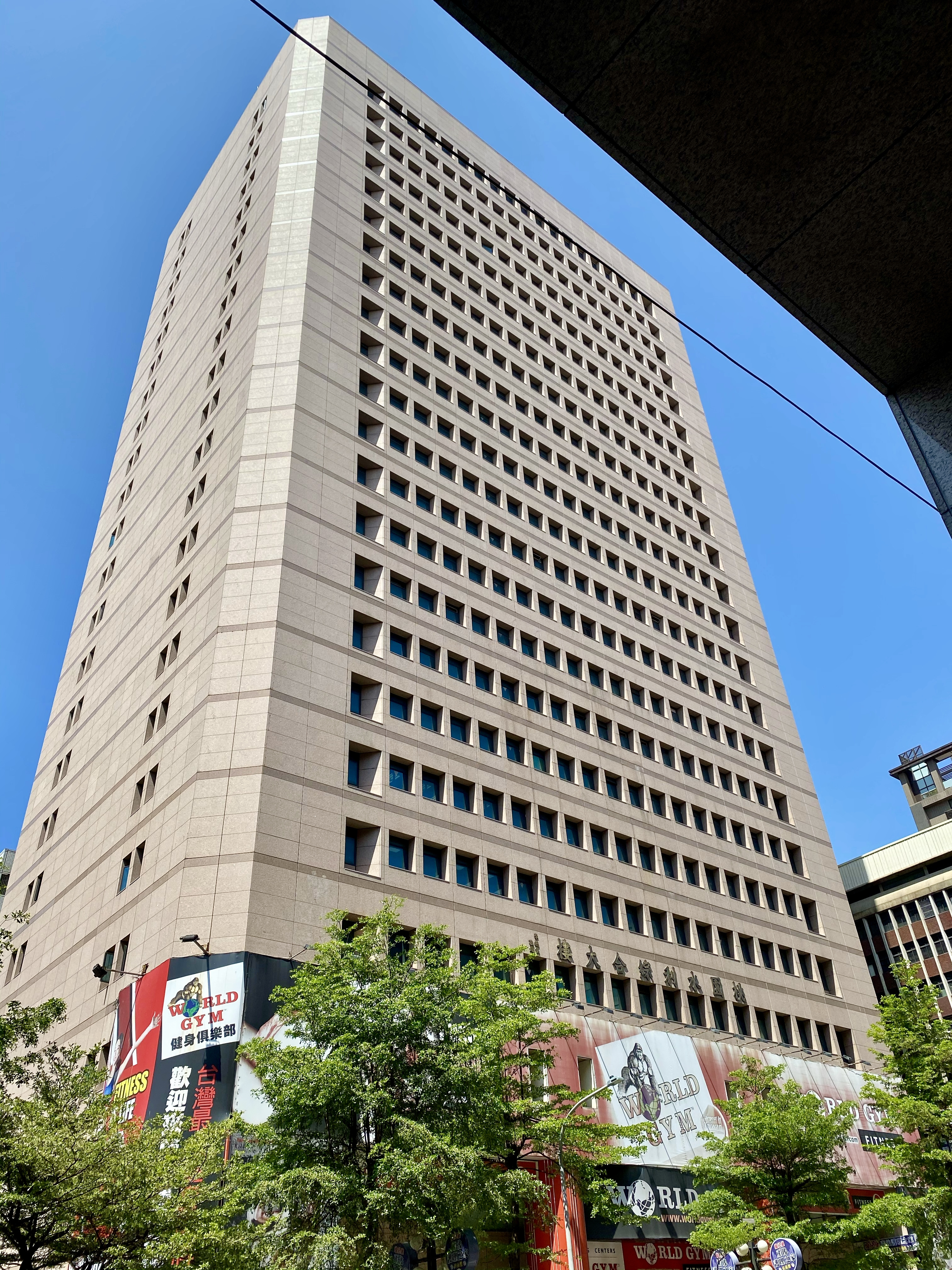
- Interactive map of the Taoyuan Water Conservancy Composite Tower 桃園水利綜合大樓 area

General information
- Status: Completed
- Type: Office building
- Classification: Office
- Location: No. 186, Fuxing Road, Taoyuan District, Taoyuan, Taiwan
- Coordinates: 24.990351°N 121.311257°E
- Completed: 1997

Height
- Roof: 117.2 m (385 ft)

Technical details
- Floor count: 23

The Taoyuan Water Conservancy Composite Tower (Chinese: 桃園水利綜合大樓) is a 23-storey, 117.3 m (385 ft) skyscraper office building completed in 1997 and located in Taoyuan District, Taoyuan, Taiwan. The building housed the Taoyuan branch of the Water Resources Agency, which was set to move to a new building in Qingpu Special District after its completion in 2021. As of April 2021, it is tied with ChungYuet Global Business Building as the fifth tallest building in the city.

== See also ==
- List of tallest buildings in Taiwan
- List of tallest buildings in Taoyuan City
- Water Resources Agency
- ChungYuet Global Business Building
