= List of tallest buildings in Taoyuan =

Taoyuan
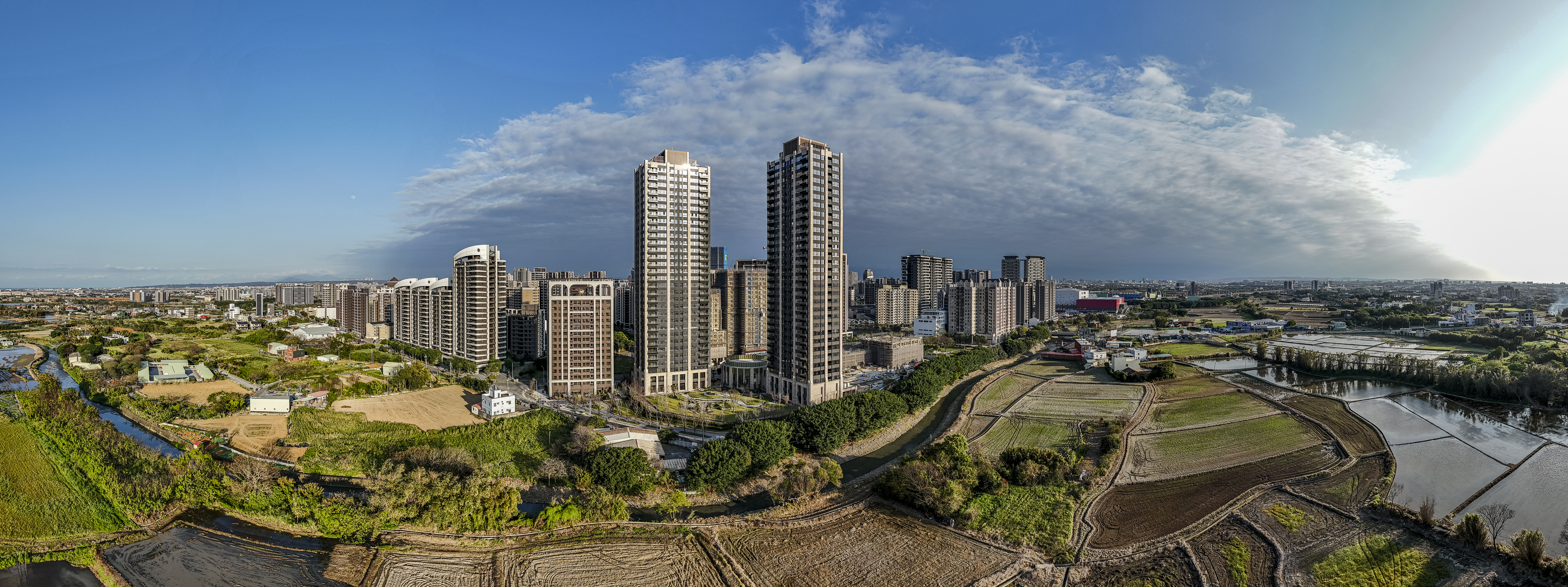
- Skyline of Qingpu, Taoyuan
- Tallest building: ChungYuet Royal Landmark A (2012)
- Tallest building height: 153 m (502 ft)
- First 150 m+ building: ChungYuet World Center (2012)

Number of tall buildings
- Taller than 100 m (328 ft): 27
- Taller than 150 m (492 ft): 4

This list of tallest buildings in Taoyuan City ranks buildings in the Taiwanese city of Taoyuan by height.

Taoyuan is the fifth largest city of Taiwan and has gradually developed into a modern metropolis in recent years, especially after the approval of the urban planning development of Taoyuan Aerotropolis. Many modern highrises have been built. Many of them are located in the modern central business districts Taoyuan District, as well as the rapid development of Luzhu District, Guishan District, and Bade District in recent years. Currently, the tallest building in Taoyuan is the 38–storey ChungYuet Royal Landmark, which rises 153 metres (502 ft) and was completed in 2012.

== Tallest buildings in Taoyuan City ==
As of December 2023, the list of buildings in Taoyuan at least 100 m (330 ft) high is as follows according to Skyscraperpage, Emporis and the Council on Tall Buildings and Urban Habitat. An equal sign (=) following a rank indicates the same height between two or more buildings. The "Year" column indicates the year of completion. The list includes only habitable buildings, as opposed to structures such as observation towers, radio masts, transmission towers and chimneys.

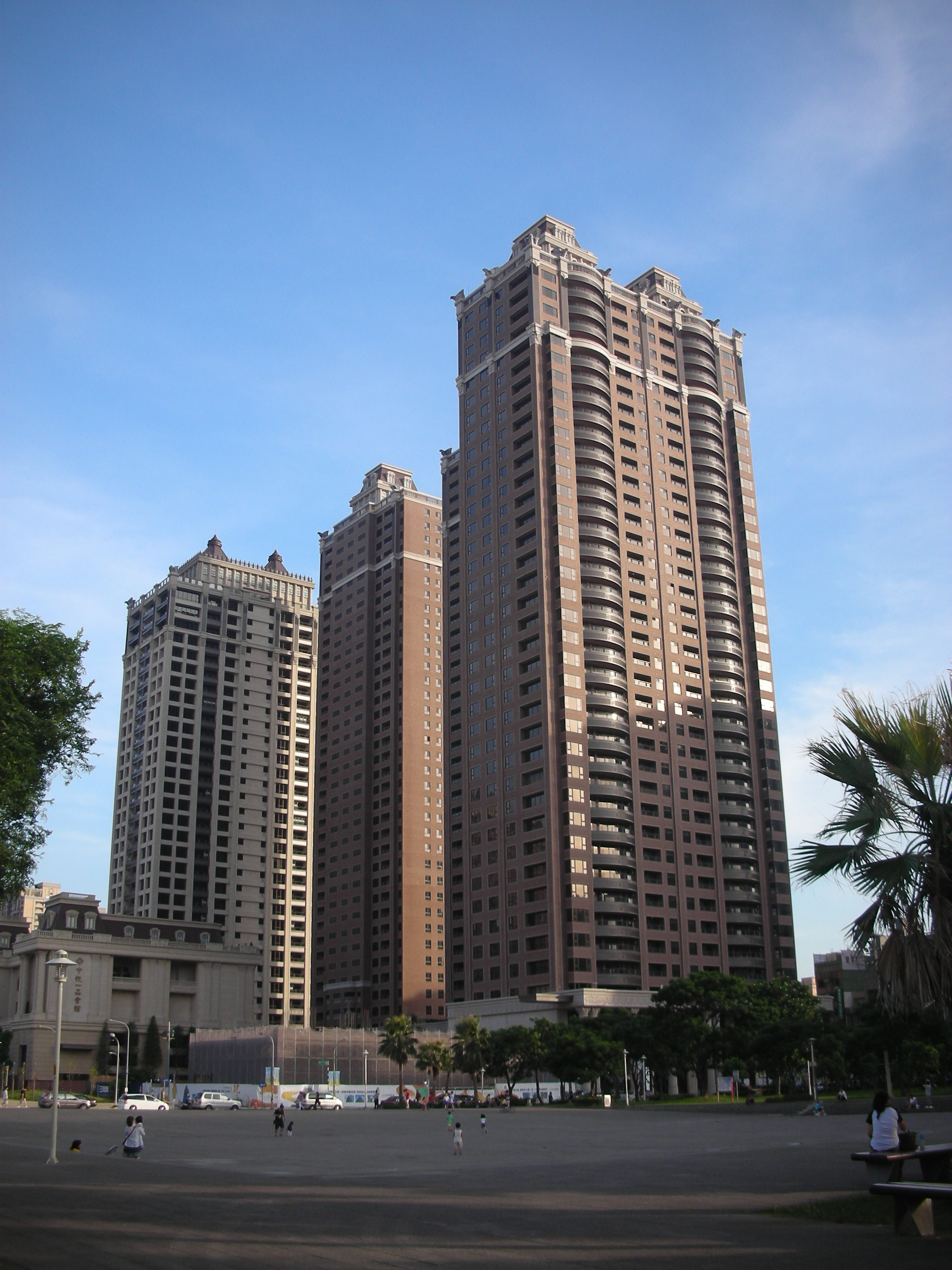
ChungYuet Royal Landmark

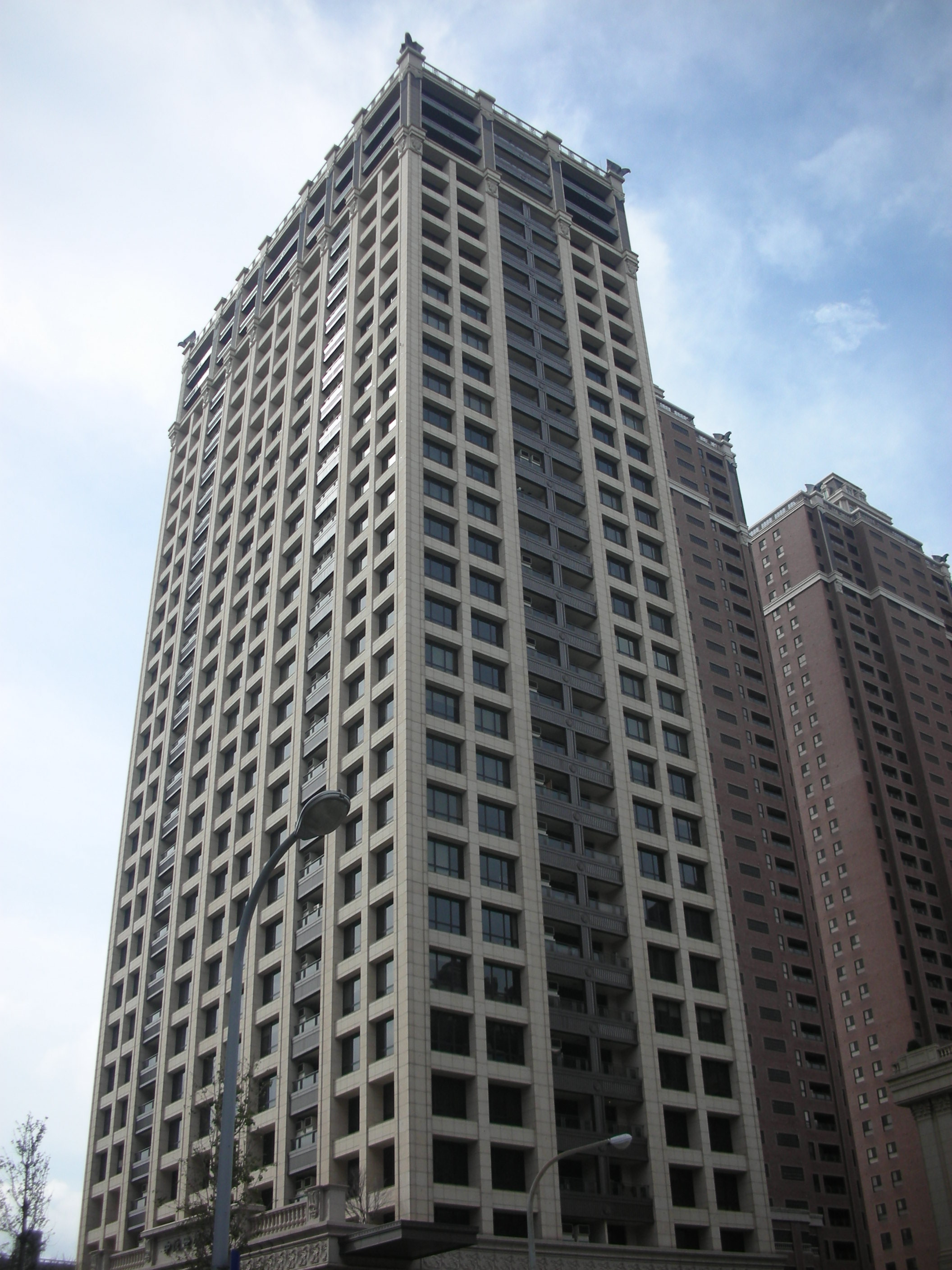
ChungYuet World Center

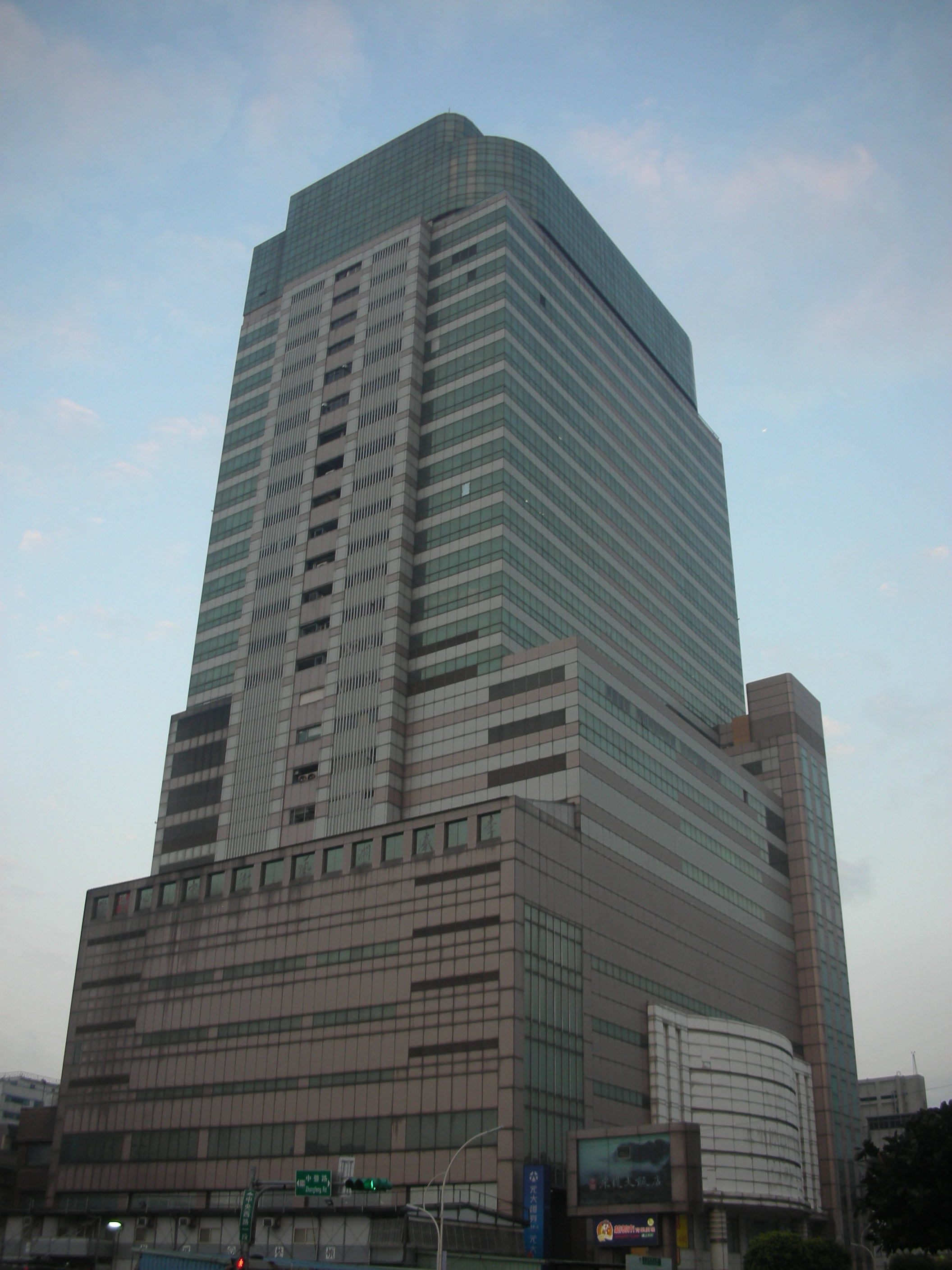
Financial Star Building

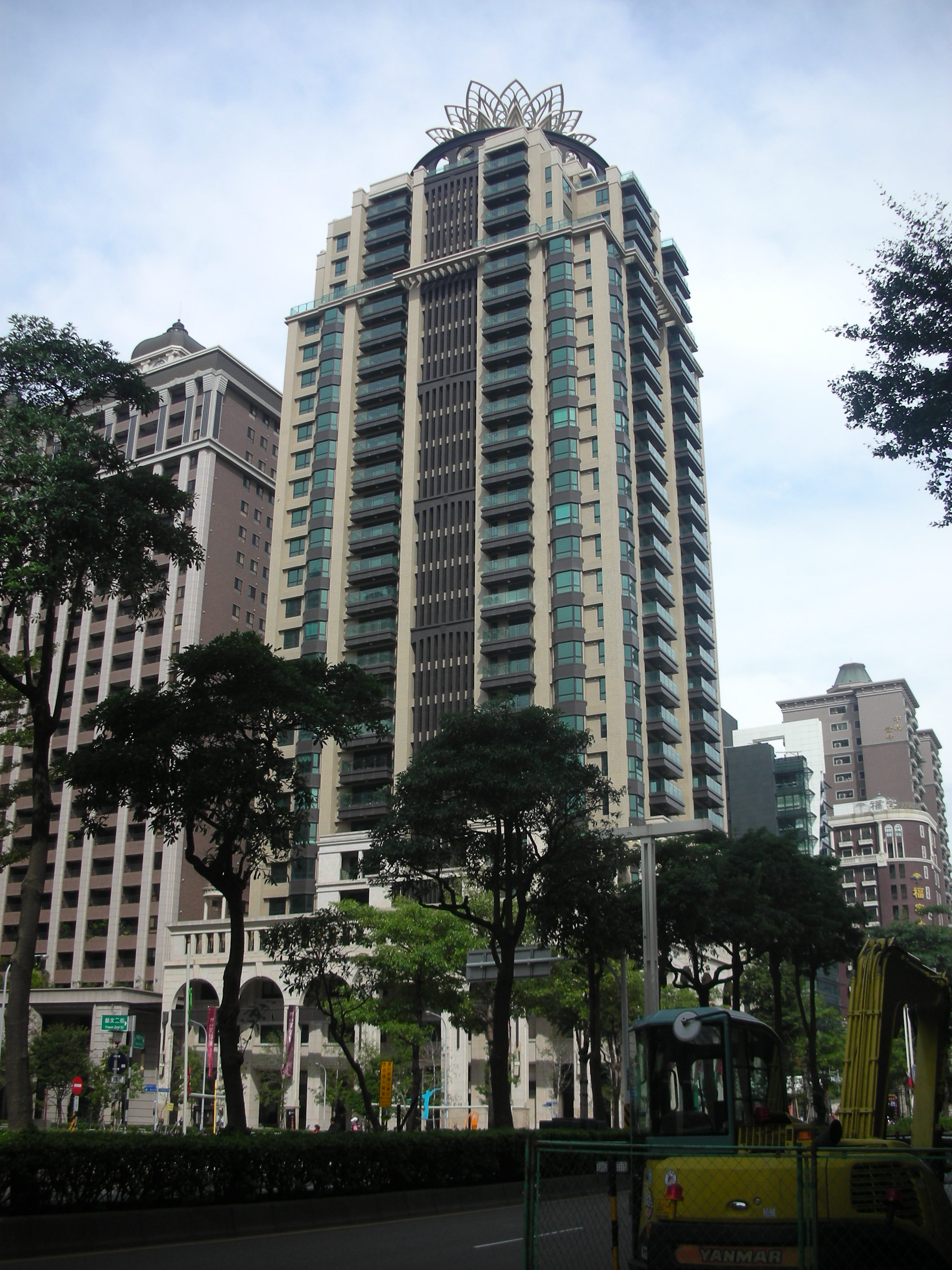
The Royal Kingdom

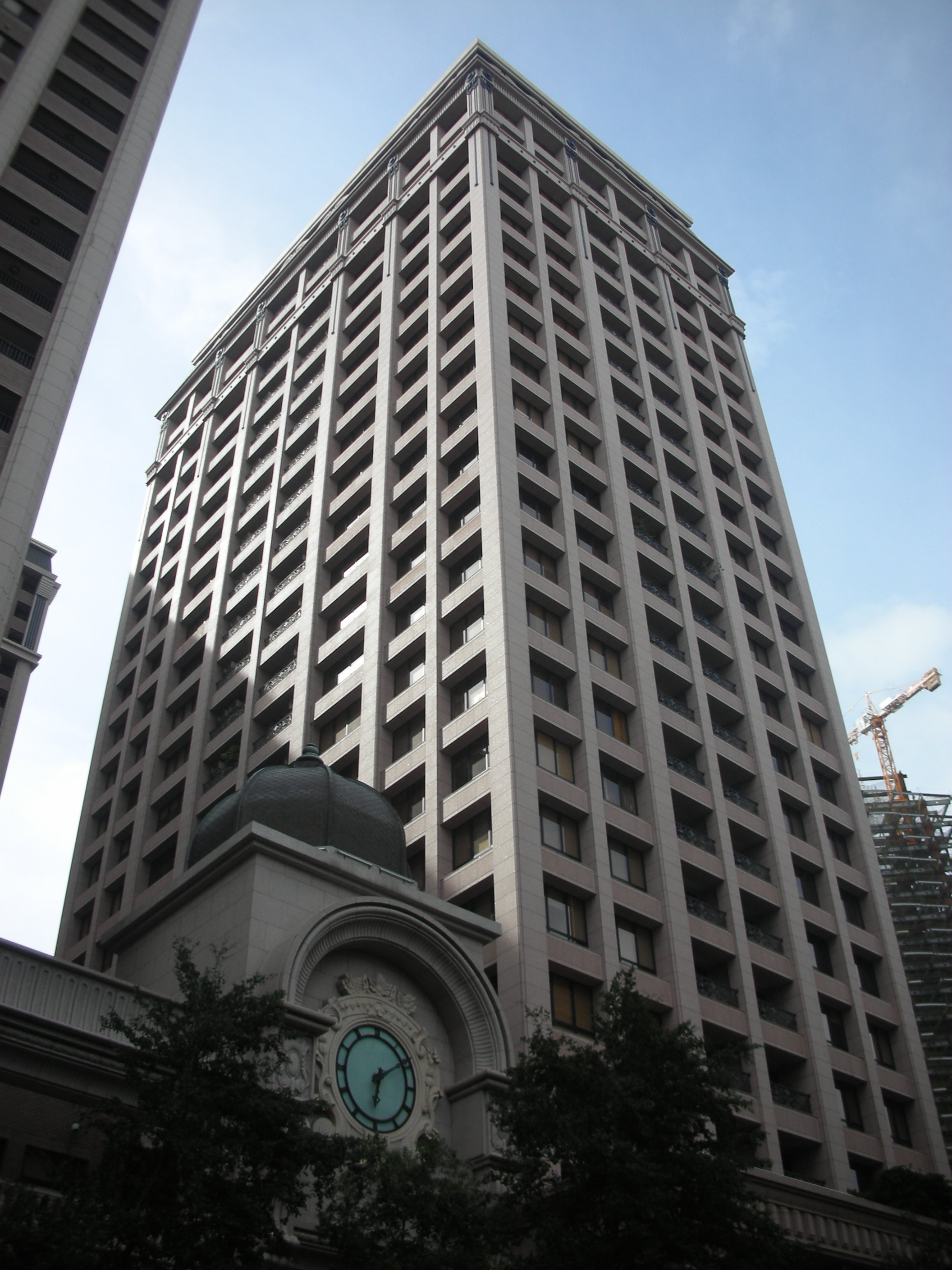
ChungYuet Global Business Building

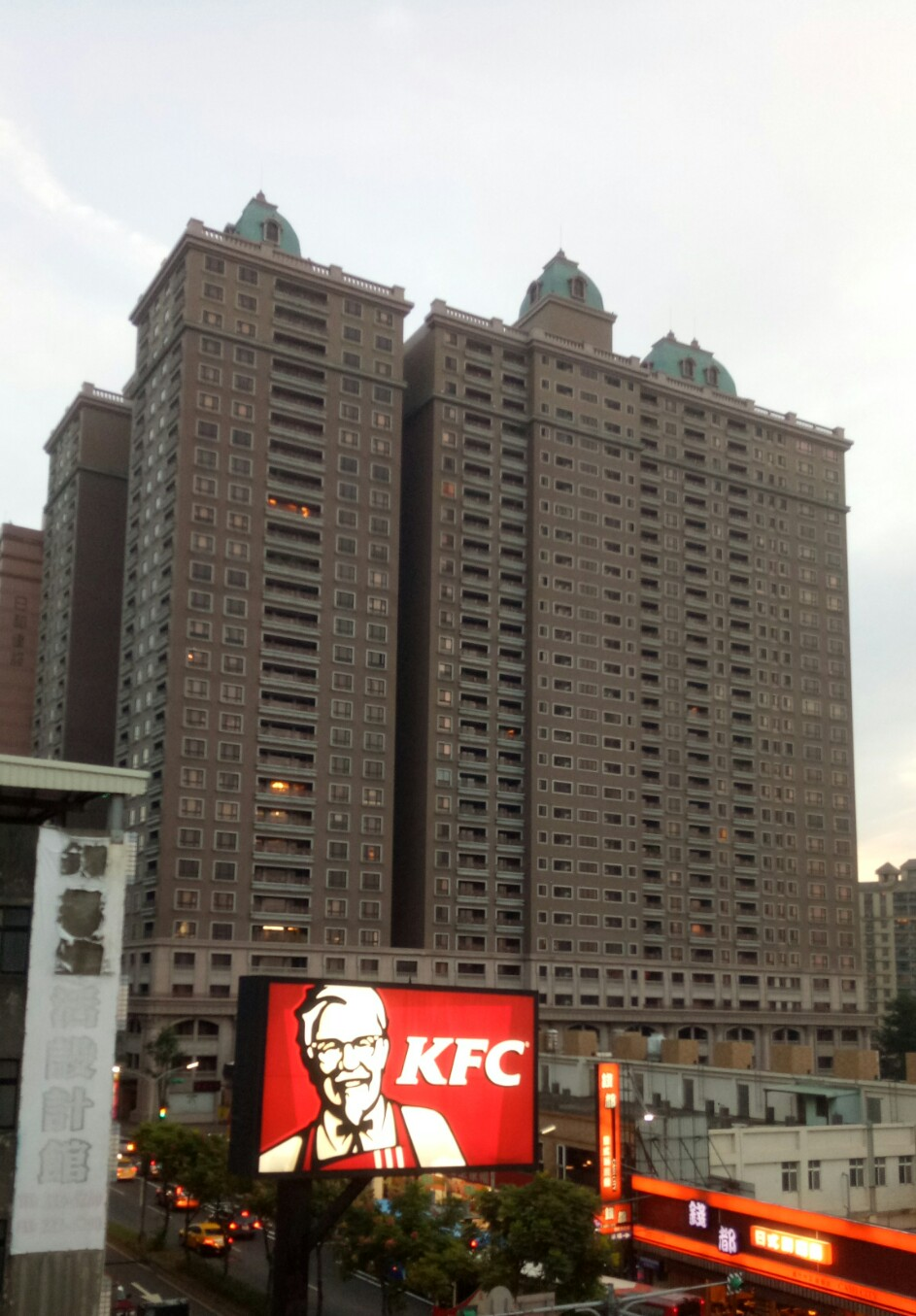
Chung Yuet Palace

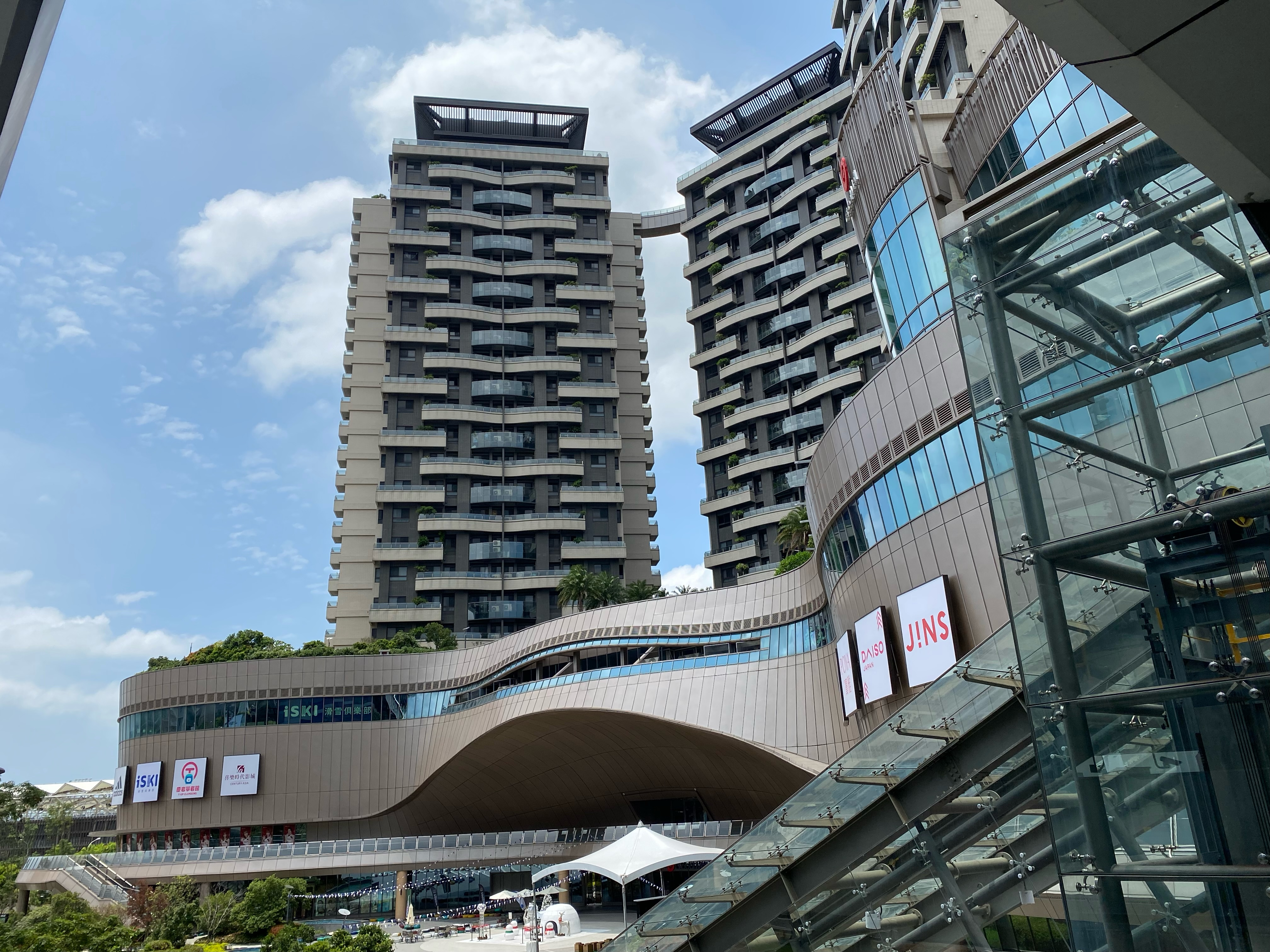
MRT Sky Garden

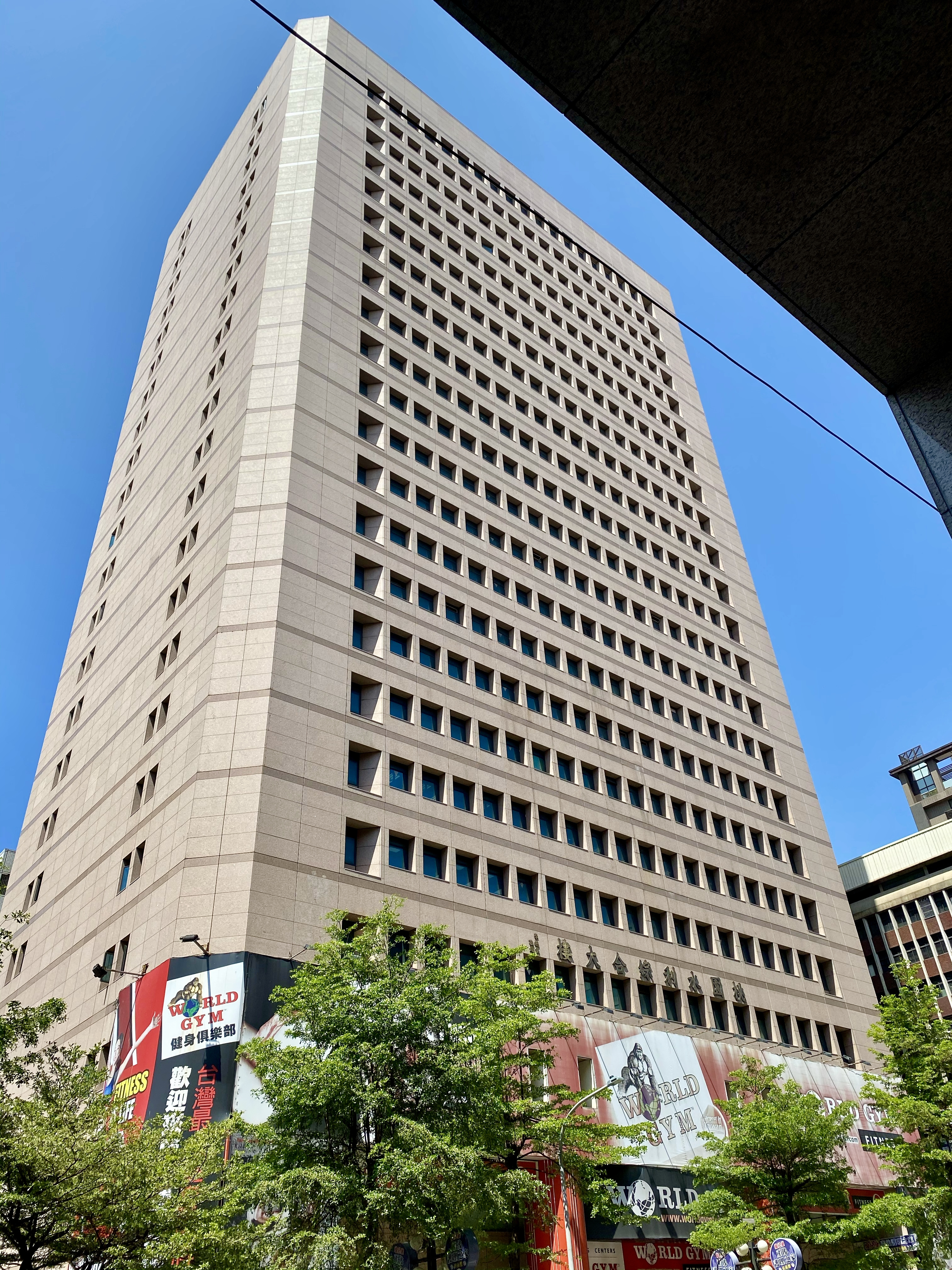
Taoyuan Water Conservancy Composite Tower

Rank	Name	Height	Floors	Year	Usage	District	Reference
1	ChungYuet Royal Landmark A (中悅一品 A)	153 m	38	2012	Residential	Taoyuan District	
1=	ChungYuet Royal Landmark B (中悅一品 B)	153 m	38	2012	Residential	Taoyuan District	
1=	ChungYuet Royal Landmark C (中悅一品 C)	153 m	38	2012	Residential	Taoyuan District	
4	ChungYuet World Center (中悅世界中心)	150 m	32	2012	Office	Taoyuan District	
5	National Financial Center (NFC環球經貿中心)	136.2 m	28	2026	Office	Taoyuan District	
6	Highwealth Landmark (興富發鉑悅)	125.9 m	35	2026	Residential	Taoyuan District	
7	The World of Art (麗寶芙蓉匯)	124.4 m	28	2015	Residential	Taoyuan District	
8	HLA (HLA.悦)	123.7 m	31	2024	Residential	Zhongli District	
8=	Financial Star Building (世貿財星廣場)	123.7 m	30	1993	Office	Zhongli District	
10	Splendid Garden (中悦栢花園)	123.3 m	31	2023	Residential	Taoyuan District	
11	Chung Yuet Palace (中悅帝寶)	120.95 m	29	2006	Residential	Luzhu District	
12	ChungYuet Global Business Building (中悅環球企業總部)	117.3 m	25	2009	Office	Taoyuan District	
13	Beautiful Garden (中悅麗舍花園)	116.96 m	29	2017	Residential	Taoyuan District	
14	Chung Yuet Dawujun (中悅大吾疆)	114.95 m	29	2012	Residential	Taoyuan District	
15	Jiajing Waldorf (嘉璟華爾道夫)	113.35 m	26	2013	Residential	Taoyuan District	
16	Landmark Plaza Taoyuan (麗晶花園廣場)	112.4 m	27	2019	Residential	Taoyuan District	
17	Zhaoyang Zongheng (昭揚縱橫)	108.95 m	29	2017	Residential	Taoyuan District	
18	Zhaoyang Qiankun (昭揚乾坤)	108.9 m	27	2016	Residential	Taoyuan District	
19=	MRT Sky Garden (冠德青璞匯)	108.9 m	25	2019	Residential	Zhongli District	
19	The Garden of Art (中悅美樹花園)	108.8 m	28	2019	Residential	Taoyuan District	
21	World One (麗寶W1)	108.6 m	29	2013	Residential	Luzhu District	
22	Better Future (遠雄新未來)	108.3 m	28	2021	Residential	Guishan District	
23	Zhongyue Central Park (中悅中央公園)	107.8 m	26	2018	Residential	Taoyuan District	
24	Hexiong Dixi I (合雄帝璽 I)	106.6 m	29	2013	Residential	Taoyuan District	
24=	Hexiong Dixi II (合雄帝璽 II)	106.6 m	29	2013	Residential	Taoyuan District	
24=	The Grace Mansion (悅龍莊)	106.6 m	27	2014	Residential	Taoyuan District	
27	Golden City (鴻築金捷市)	106.3 m	28	2020	Residential	Guishan District	
28	Champs Palace (香榭尊邸)	106 m	26	2008	Residential	Luzhu District	
29	Chung Yuet Yu Yuan (中悅御之苑)	105.1 m	25	2010	Residential	Taoyuan District	
30	The Ultimate Palace (中悅上林苑)	104.2 m	27	2013	Residential	Luzhu District	
31	The One (百俊吾双)	103.1 m	27	2023	Residential	Taoyuan District	
32	Griffith V (葛里法五世)	102.38 m	27	2013	Residential	Taoyuan District	
33	Griffin W (葛里法W)	100.32 m	25	2008	Residential	Taoyuan District	

== Tallest buildings by district ==
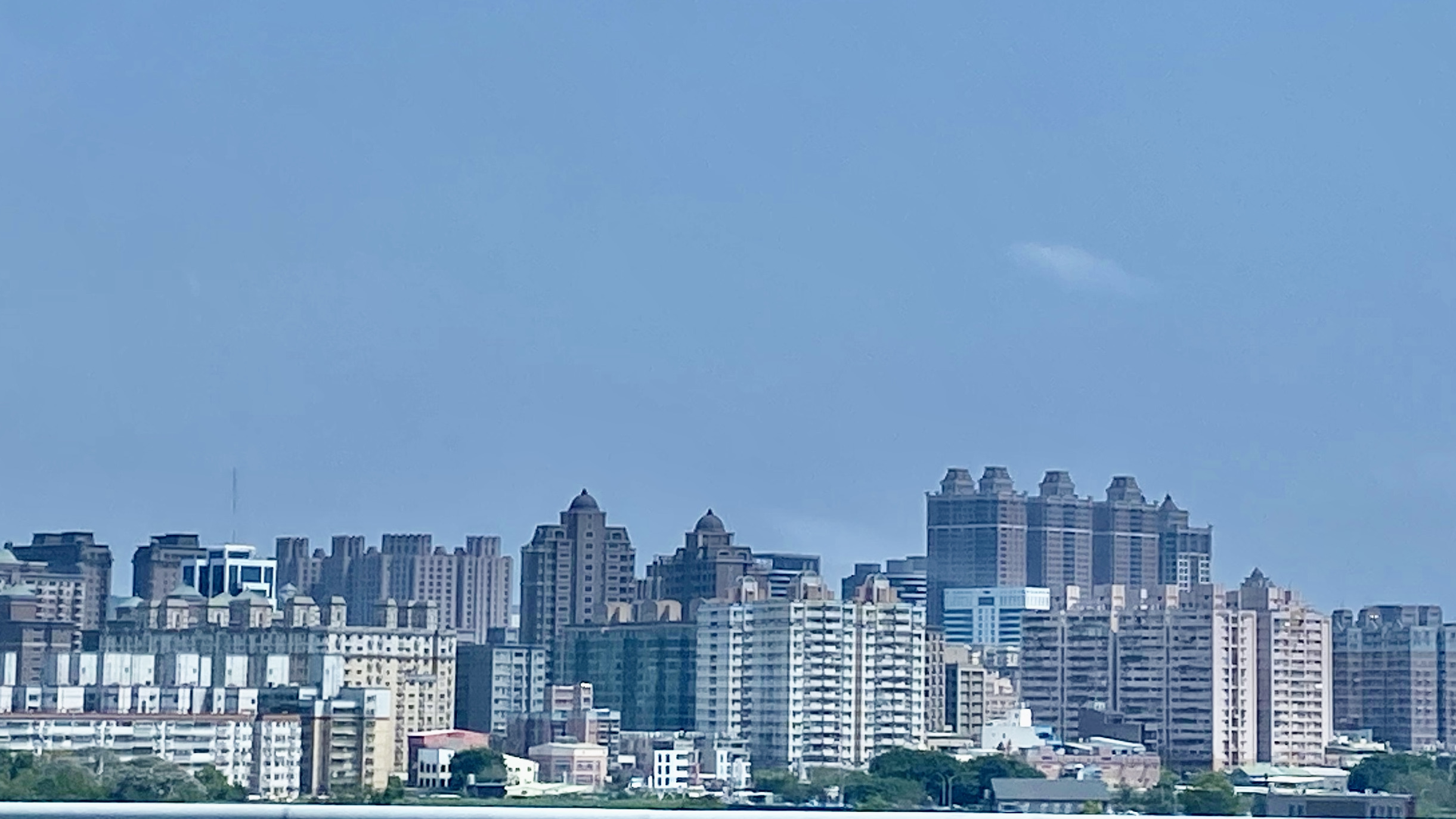
Taoyuan Zhongzheng Arts and Cultural Business District

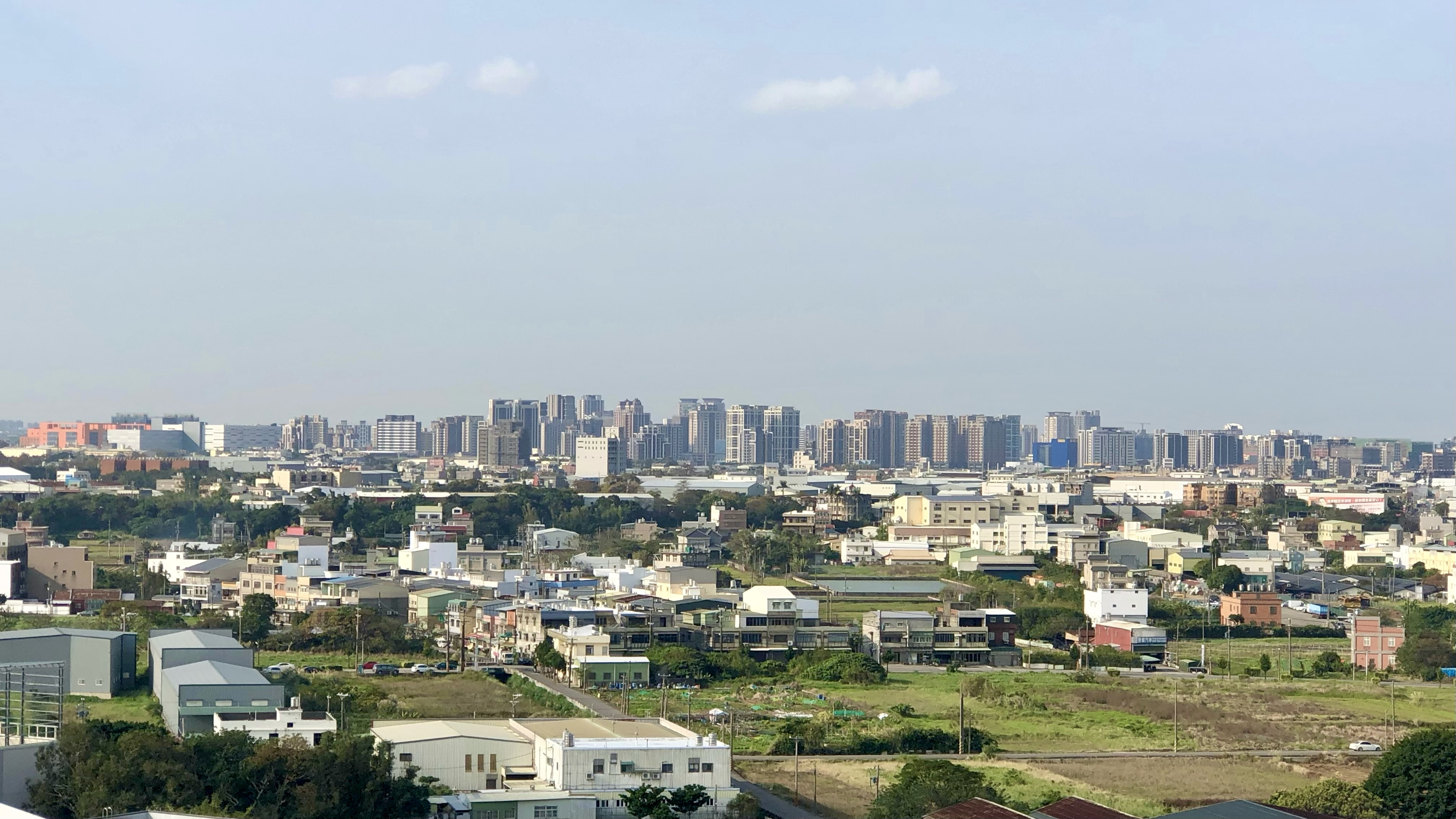
Qingpu Special District

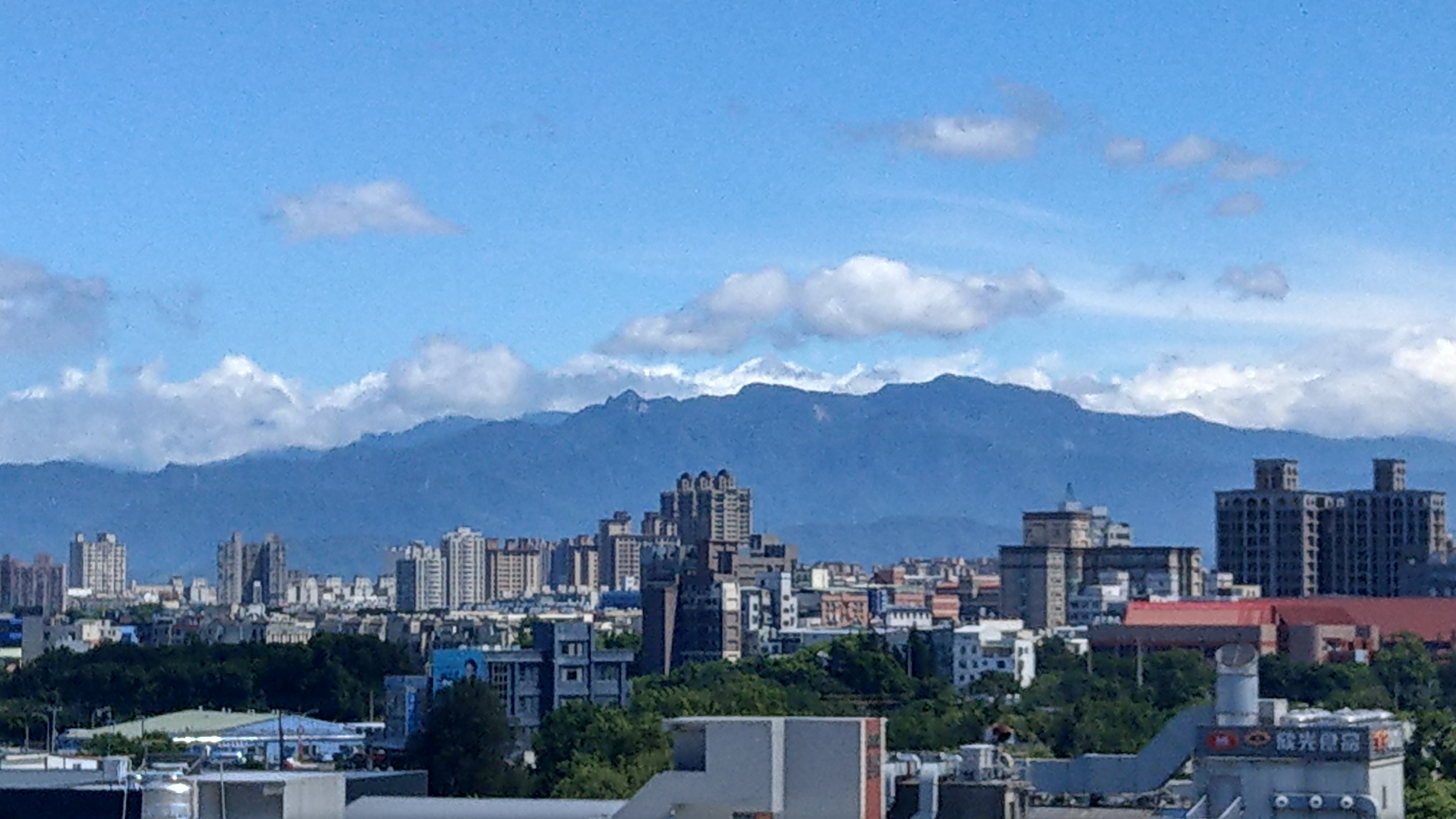
Zhongli

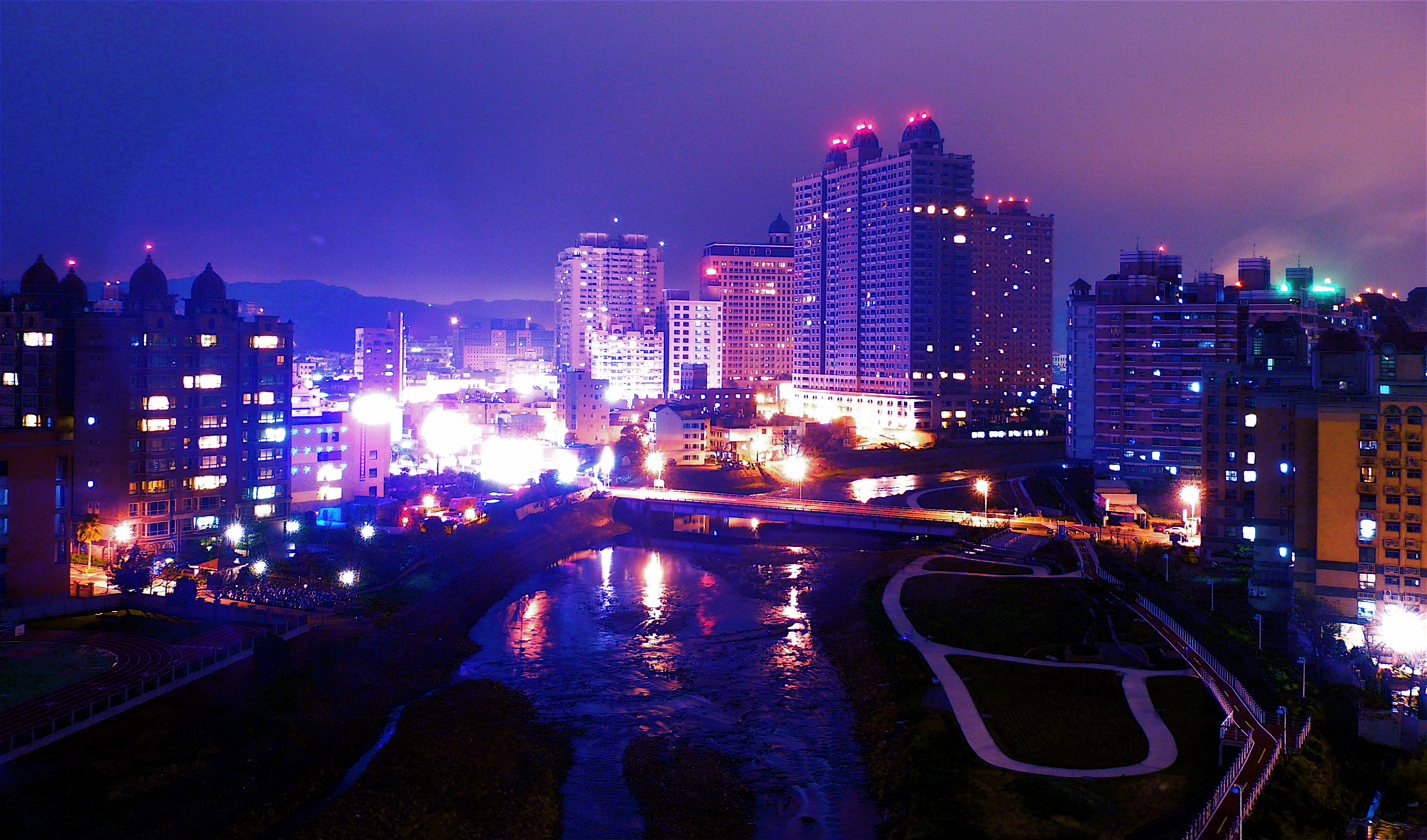
Luzhu

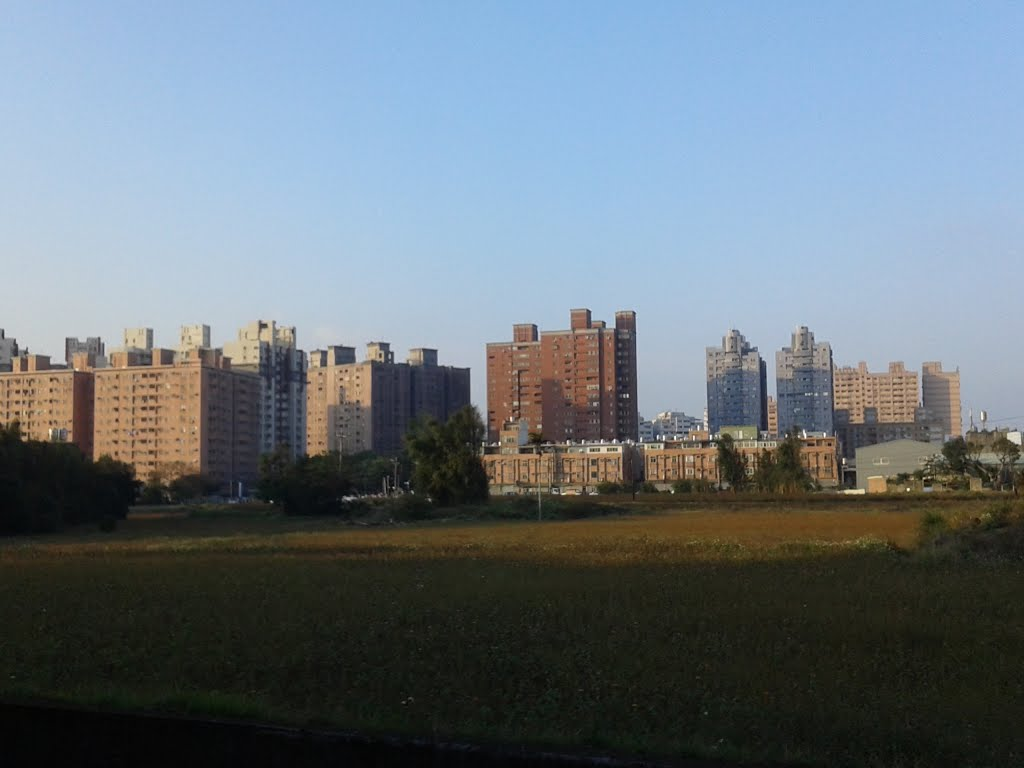
Pingzhen

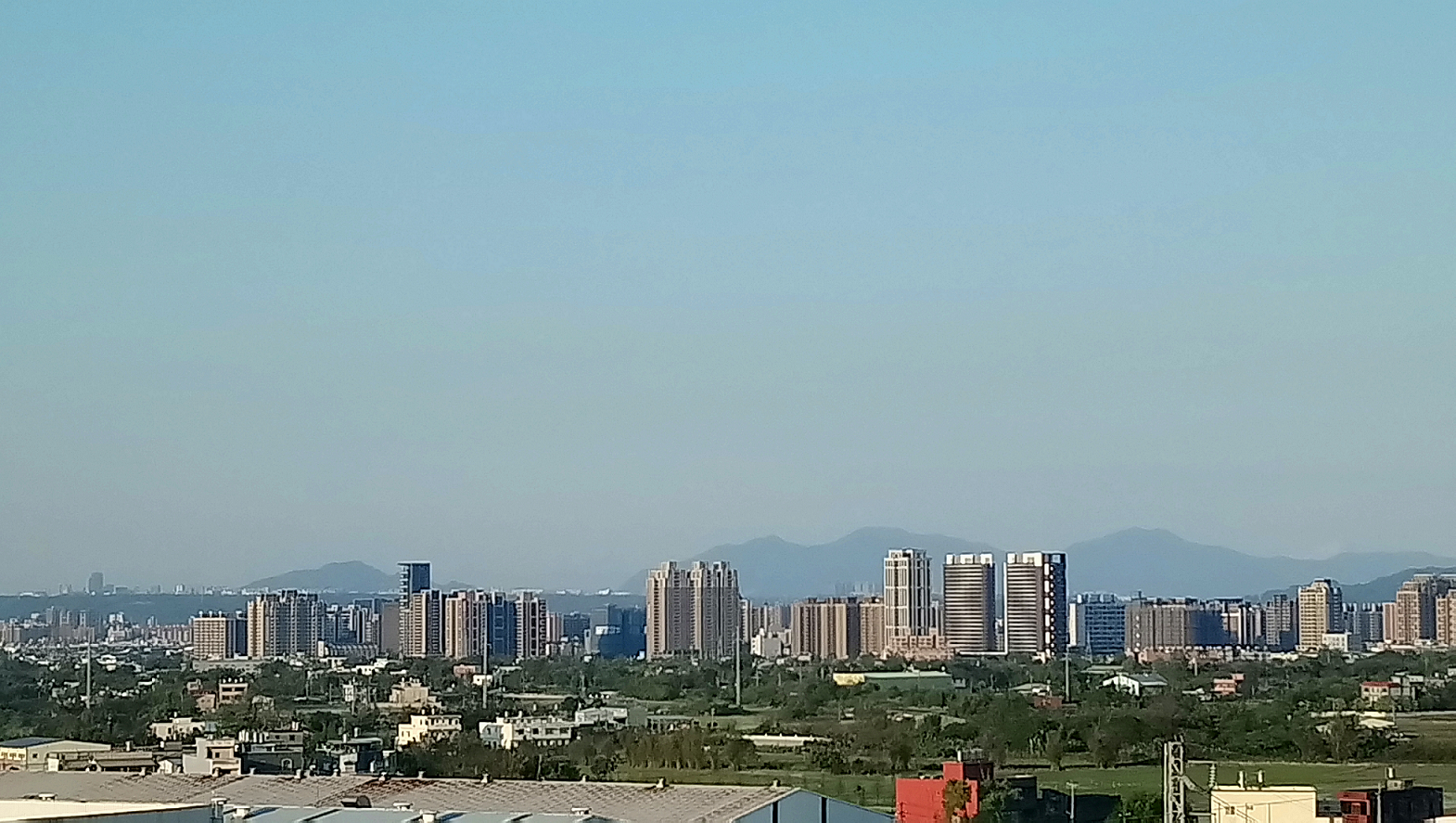
Bade

== Panoramic ==
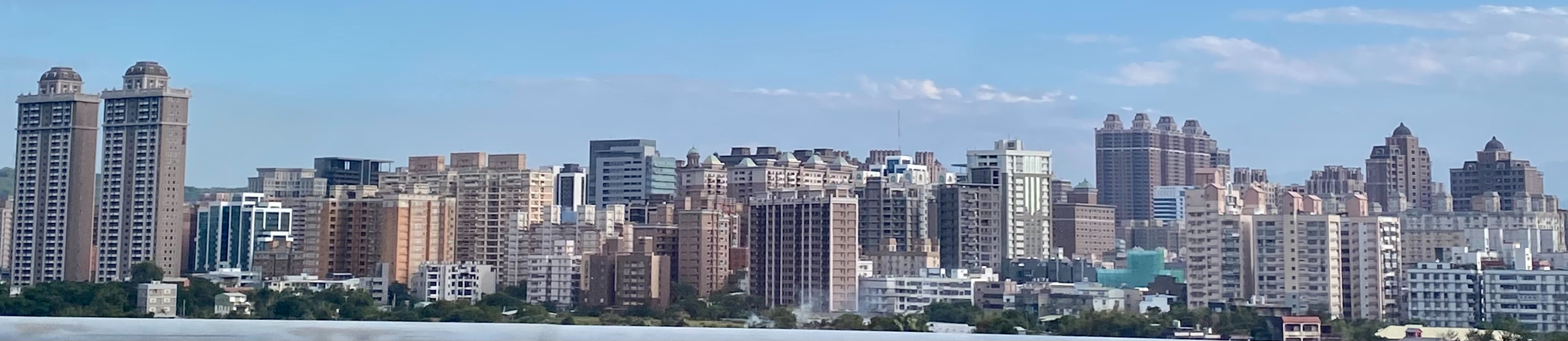
Panoramic skyline of tallest buildings in Taoyuan City.

== See also ==
- Skyscraper
- List of tallest buildings
- List of tallest buildings in Taiwan
- List of tallest buildings in Taichung
- List of tallest buildings in Taipei
- List of tallest buildings in Kaohsiung
