= Chung Yuet Palace =

Residential skyscraper complex in Taiwan

Chung Yuet Palace 中悅帝寶
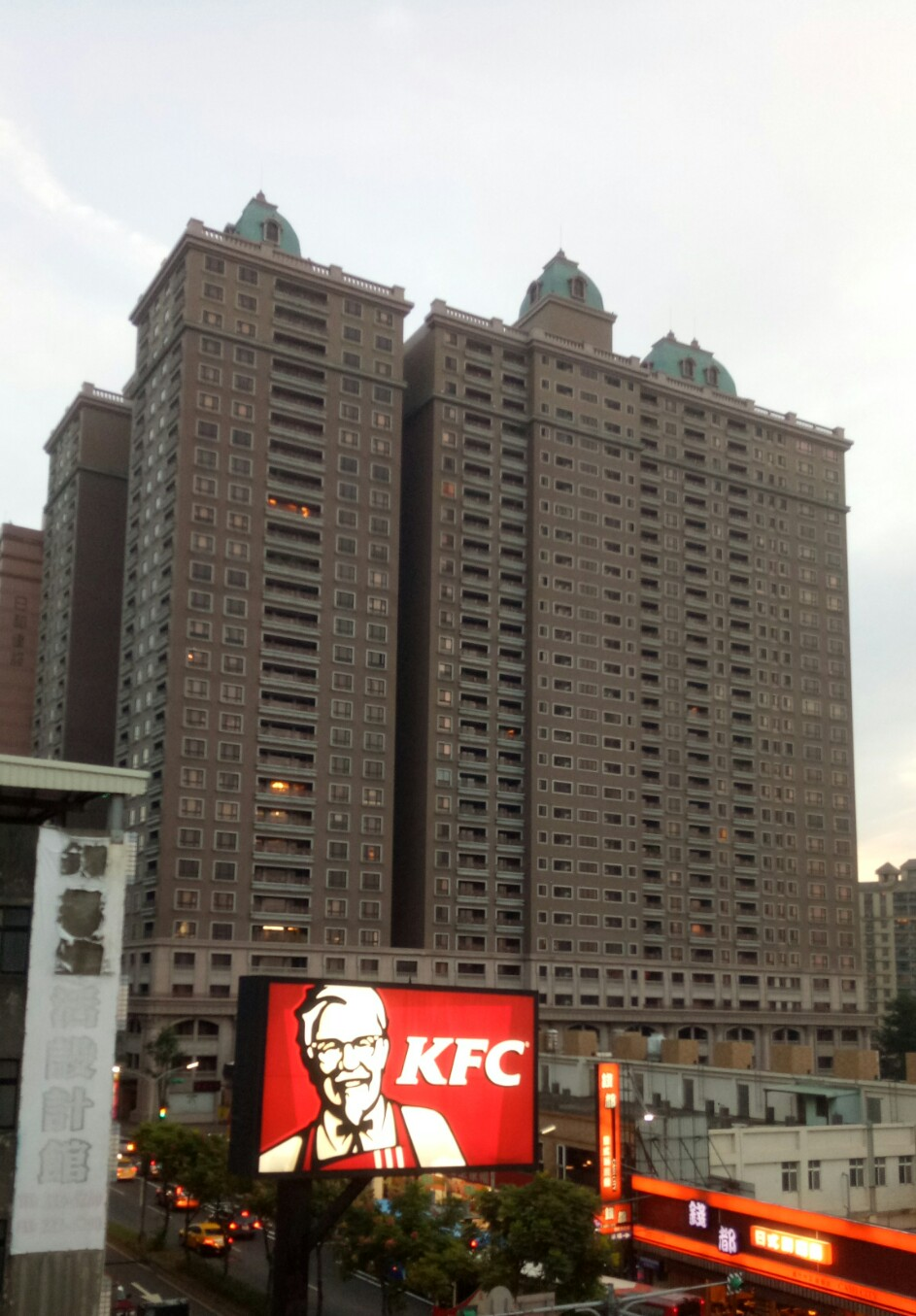
- Interactive map of the Chung Yuet Palace 中悅帝寶 area

General information
- Status: Completed
- Type: Residential
- Location: No.29, Zhongzheng Road, Luzhu District, Taoyuan, Taiwan
- Coordinates: 25°2′34″N 121°17′39″E
- Completed: 2006

Height
- Architectural: 120.95 m (396.8 ft)
- Roof: 108.95 m (357.4 ft)

Technical details
- Floor count: 29 above ground 3 below ground

Chung Yuet Palace (Chinese: 中悅帝寶; pinyin: Zhōngyuè Dìbǎo) is a residential skyscraper complex located in Luzhu District, Taoyuan City, Taiwan. The complex comprises two skyscraper buildings completed in 2006, with a height of 120.95 m (396.8 ft) that comprise 29 floors above ground, as well as 3 basement levels. The complex contains 188 apartment units. As of December 2021, they are the tallest buildings in Luzhu District and 6th tallest in Taoyuan City. Facilities of the condominium include two swimming pools, sauna rooms, gymnasiums, as well as entertainment and leisure facilities, such as billiard rooms, badminton and squash courts, and yoga rooms.

== See also ==
- List of tallest buildings in Taiwan
- List of tallest buildings in Taoyuan City
- ChungYuet Royal Landmark
