= ChungYuet Royal Landmark =

Residential skyscraper complex in Taoyuan, Taiwan

ChungYuet Royal Landmark 中悅一品
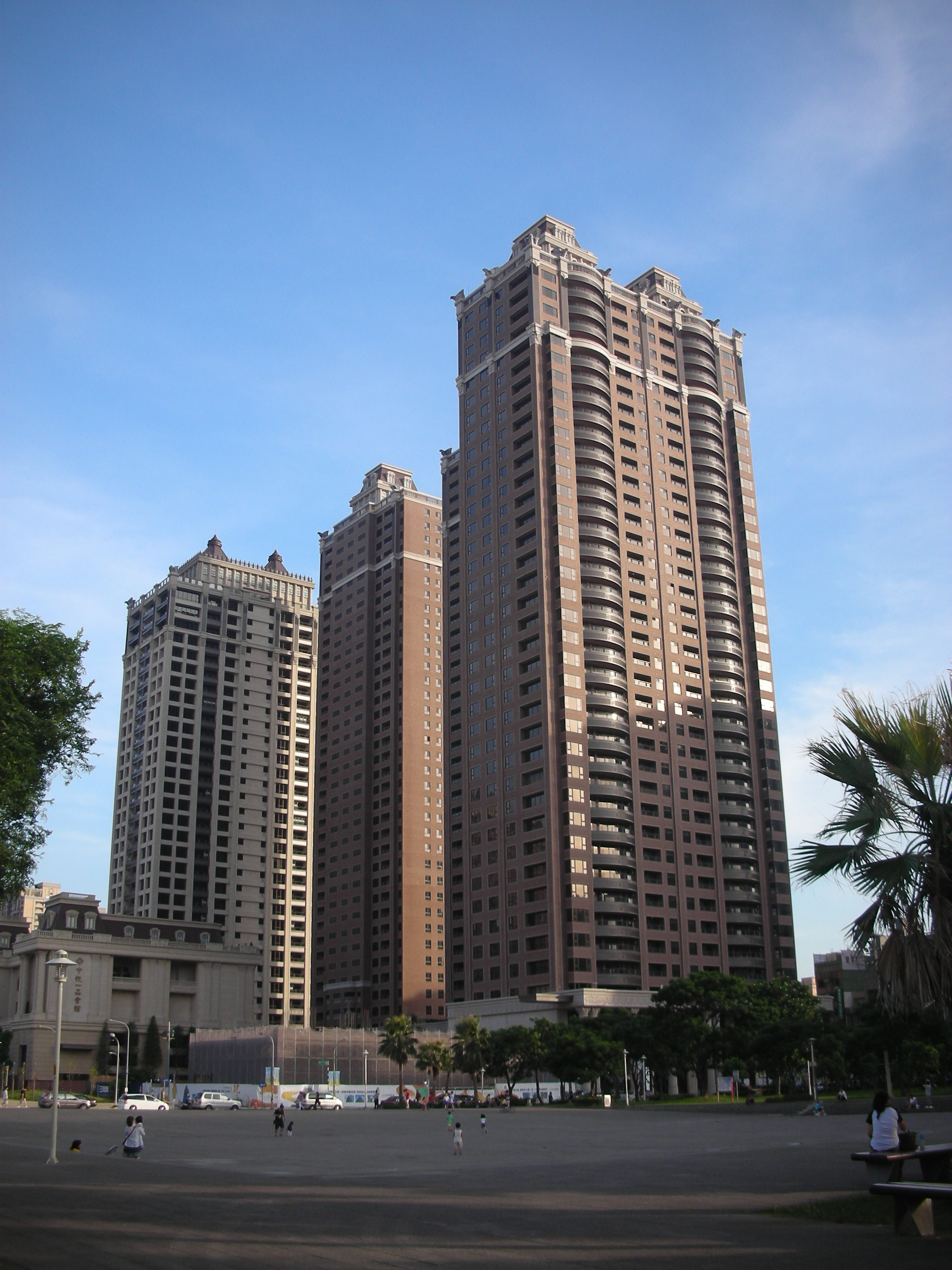

General information
- Status: Completed
- Type: Residential
- Location: Taoyuan District, Taoyuan, Taiwan
- Construction started: 2009
- Completed: 2012

Height
- Architectural: 153 m (502 ft)
- Roof: 143 m (469 ft)

Technical details
- Floor count: 38
- Floor area: 118,857.63 m^{2} (1,279,372.9 sq ft)

Design and construction
- Architect: Lin Yongfa Architects

The ChungYuet Royal Landmark (Chinese: 中悅一品; pinyin: Zhōng yuè yīpǐn) is a residential skyscraper complex located in Taoyuan District, Taoyuan, Taiwan. The complex comprises three skyscraper buildings completed in 2012, with a total floor area of 118,857.63 m^{2} (1,279,372.9 sq ft) and a height of 153 m (502 ft) that comprise 38 floors above ground, as well as 4 basement levels. The complex contains 229 apartment units.

As of December 2020, they are the tallest buildings in Taoyuan, and 54th tallest in Taiwan.

== Gallery ==
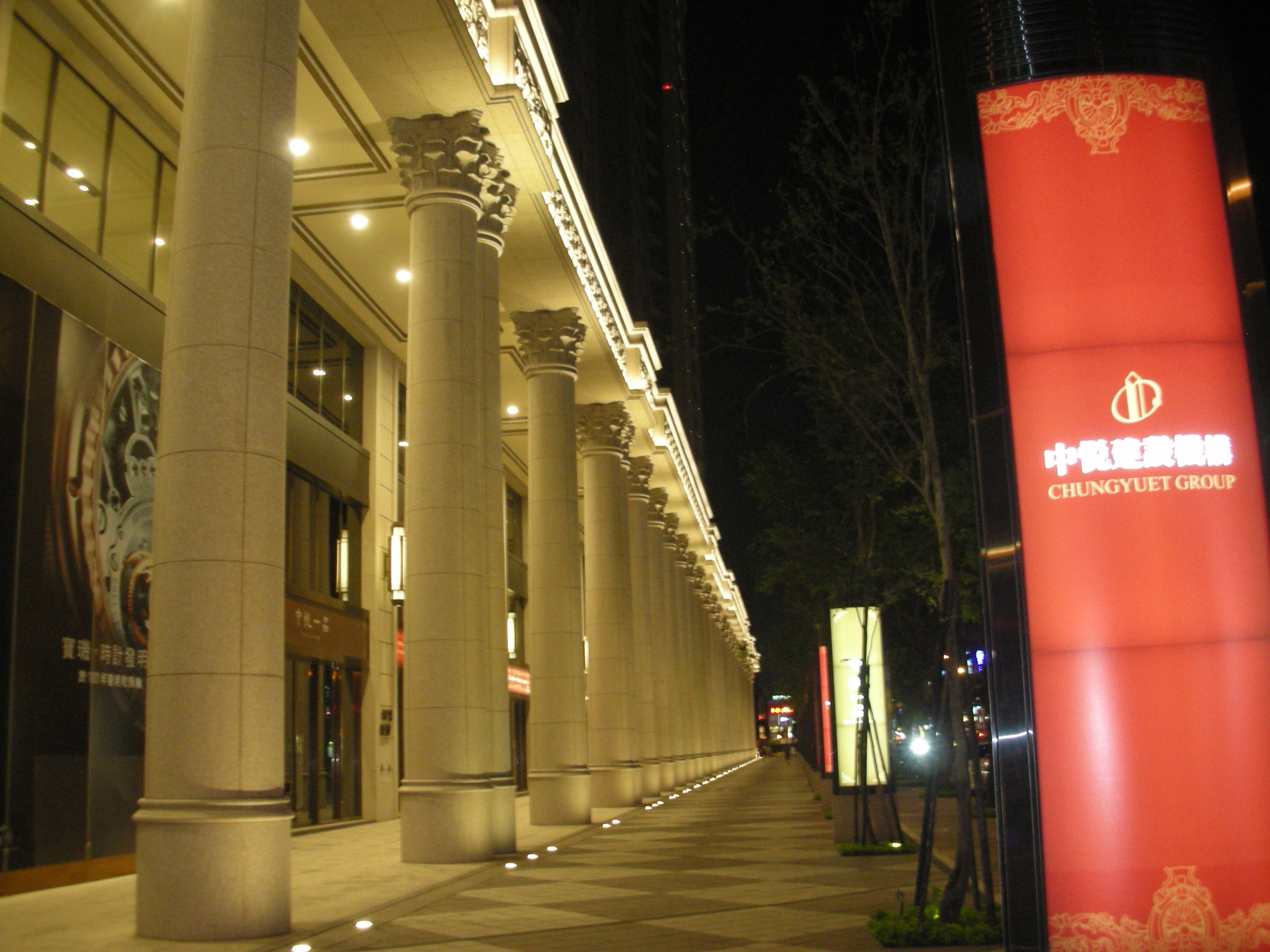
Entrance

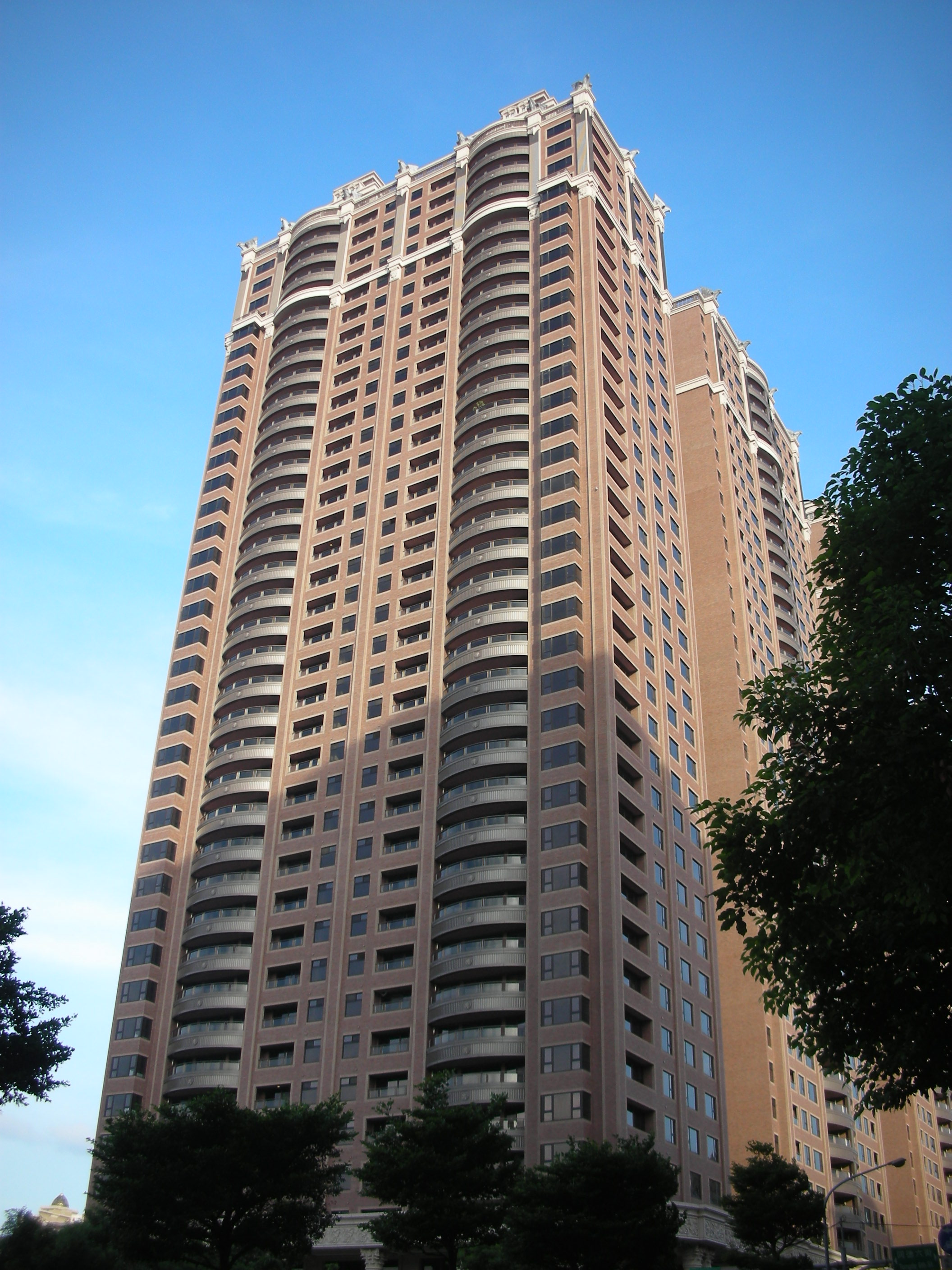
Front view

== See also ==
- List of tallest buildings in Asia
- List of tallest buildings in Taiwan
- List of tallest buildings in Taoyuan City
- Taoyuan Zhongzheng Arts and Cultural Business District
- ChungYuet Global Business Building
- ChungYuet World Center
- Gallery & Palace
