= ChungYuet Global Business Building =

Office building in Taoyuan, Taiwan

ChungYuet Global Business Building 中悅環球企業總部
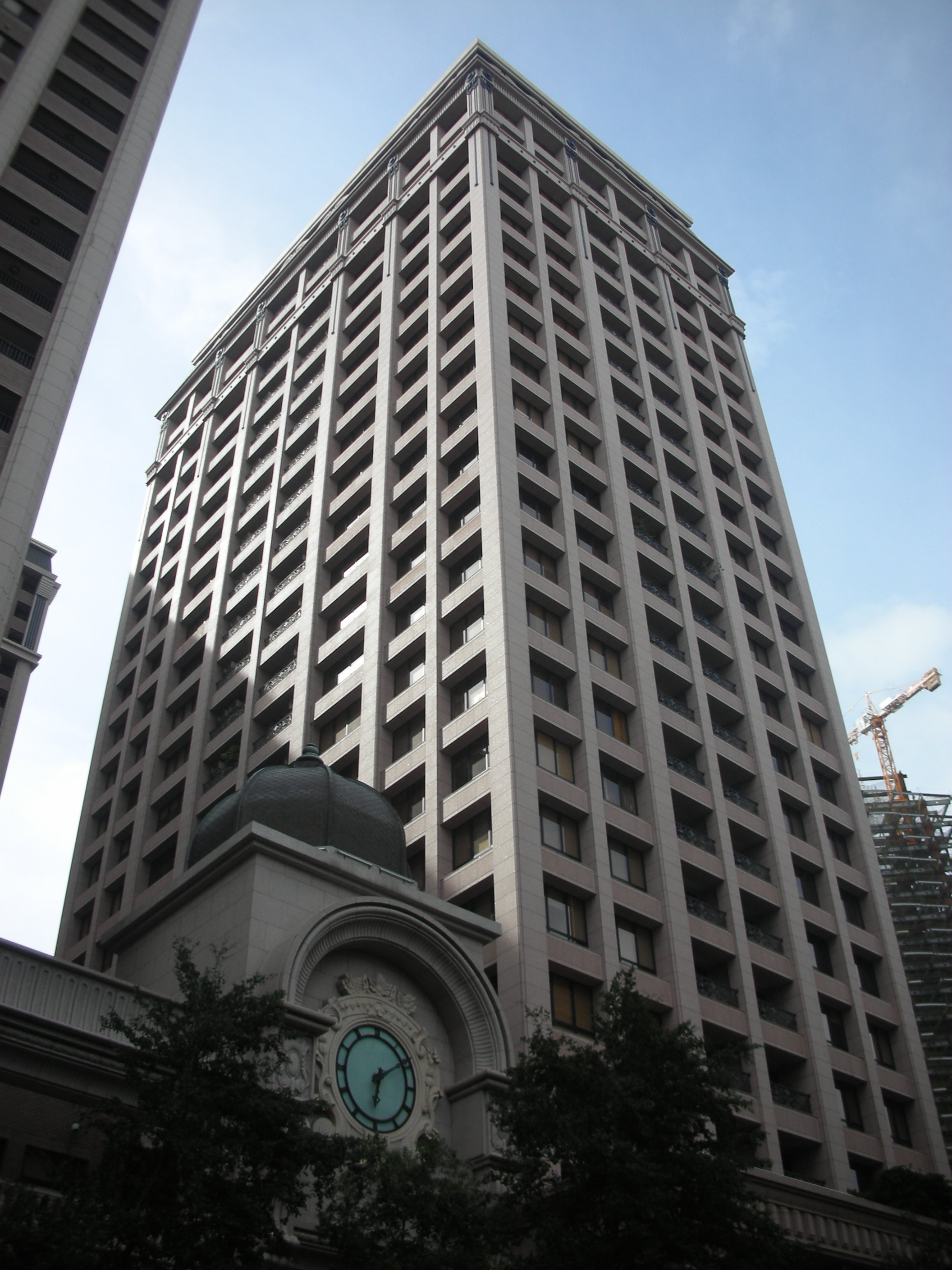
- Interactive map of the ChungYuet Global Business Building 中悅環球企業總部 area

General information
- Status: Completed
- Type: Office
- Location: Xinpu Sixth Street, Taoyuan District, Taoyuan, Taiwan
- Coordinates: 25.014720586180818°N 121.30193922512461°E
- Completed: 2009

Height
- Architectural: 117.35 m (385.0 ft)

Technical details
- Floor count: 25

The ChungYuet Global Business Building (Chinese: 中悅環球企業總部; pinyin: Zhōng yuè huánqiú qǐyè zǒngbù) is a skyscraper office building located in Taoyuan District, Taoyuan, Taiwan. The building was completed in 2009, with a height of 117.35 m (385.0 ft) that comprise 25 floors above ground.

As of January 2021, it is tied with Taoyuan Water Conservancy Composite Tower as the fifth tallest building in Taoyuan City.

== See also ==
- List of tallest buildings in Asia
- List of tallest buildings in Taiwan
- List of tallest buildings in Taoyuan City
- ChungYuet World Center
- ChungYuet Royal Landmark
- National Financial Center
