= ChungYuet World Center =

Office building in Taoyuan, Taiwan

ChungYuet World Center 中悅世界中心
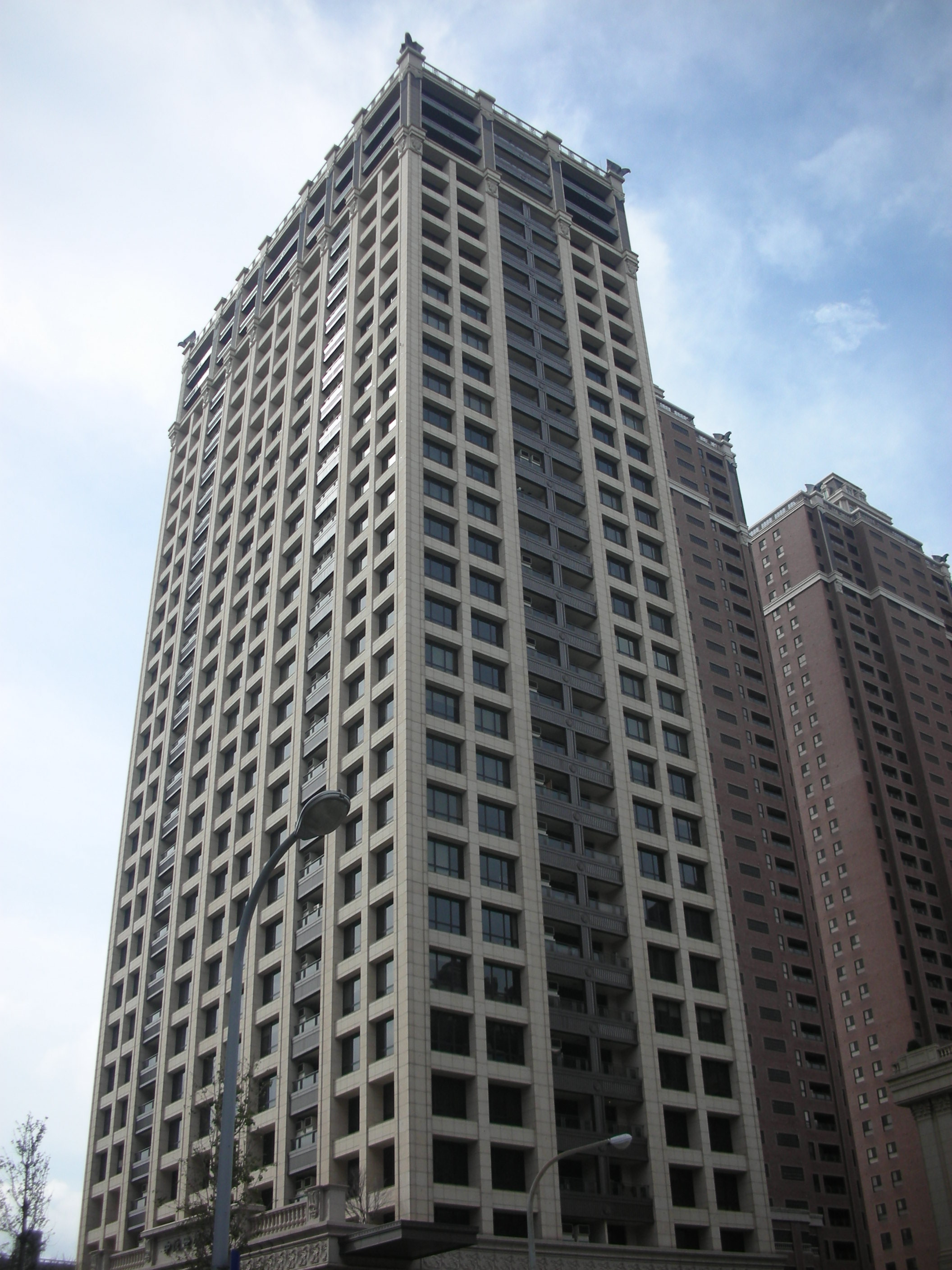
- Interactive map of the ChungYuet World Center 中悅世界中心 area

General information
- Status: Completed
- Type: Office
- Location: No. 1088, Zhongzheng Road, Taoyuan District, Taoyuan, Taiwan
- Coordinates: 25.014687°N 121.299533°E
- Construction started: 2009
- Completed: 2012

Height
- Architectural: 150 m (490 ft)
- Roof: 140.6 m (461 ft)

Technical details
- Floor count: 32
- Floor area: 60,921.61 m^{2} (655,754.8 sq ft)

Design and construction
- Architect: Lin Yongfa Architects

The ChungYuet World Center, also known as ChungYuet TGA or Wyatt World Center (Chinese: 中悅世界中心; pinyin: Zhōng yuè shìjiè zhōngxīn), is a skyscraper office building located in Taoyuan District, Taoyuan, Taiwan. The building was completed in 2012, with a total floor area of 60,921.61 m^{2} (655,754.8 sq ft) and a height of 150 m (490 ft) that comprise 32 floors above ground, as well as 4 basement levels.

As of December 2020, it is the tallest office building in Taoyuan City, second tallest building in Taoyuan City (after ChungYuet Royal Landmark) and 64th tallest in Taiwan.

== See also ==
- List of tallest buildings in Asia
- List of tallest buildings in Taiwan
- List of tallest buildings in Taoyuan City
- ChungYuet Royal Landmark
- ChungYuet Global Business Building
- National Financial Center
