= Chicony Electronics =

Taiwan-based multinational electronics manufacturer

Chicony Electronics Co., Ltd. 群光電子股份有限公司

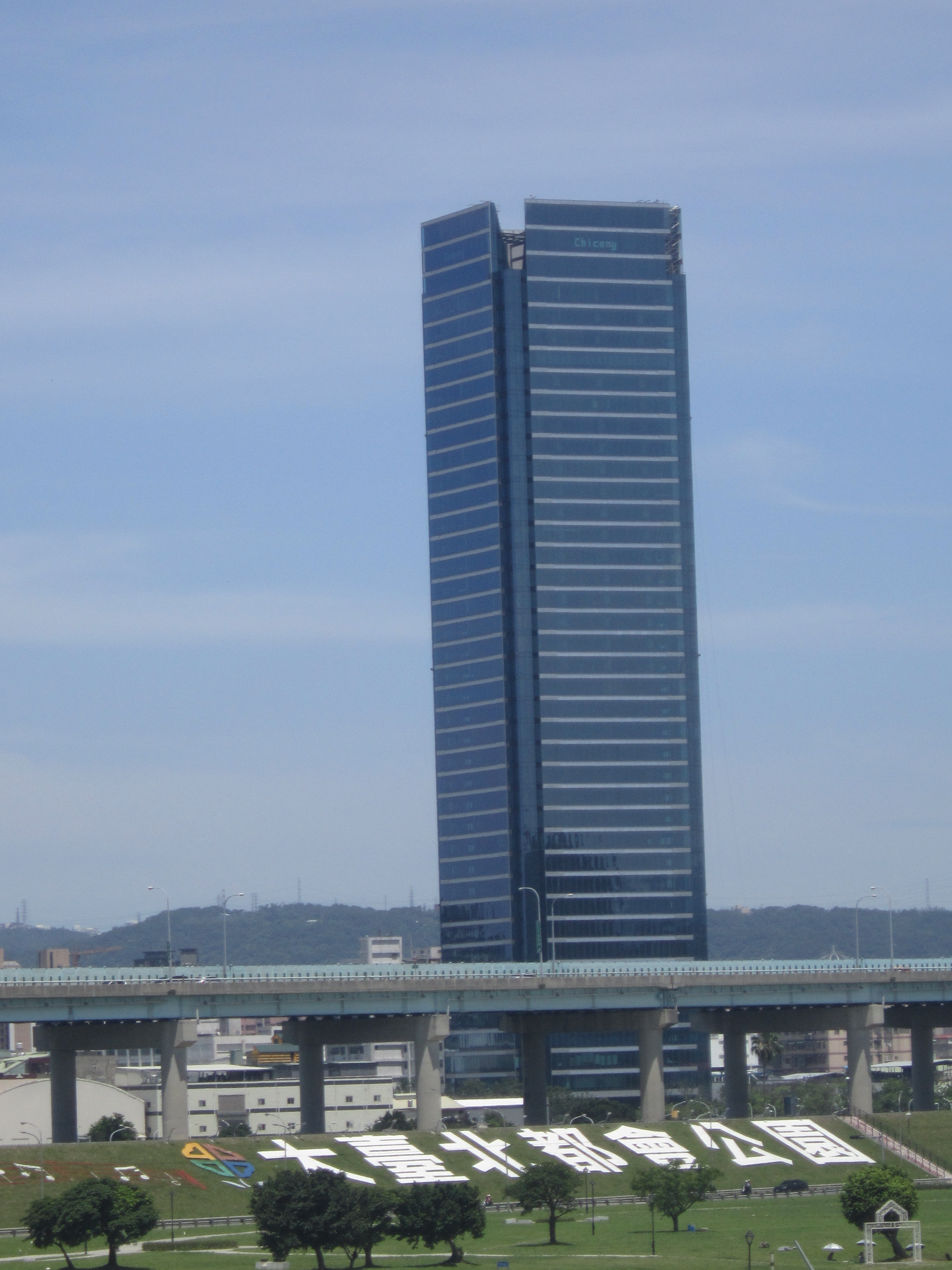
- Chicony Electronics Headquarters in Taipei, Taiwan
- Type: Public (TWSE: 2385)
- Industry: Computer hardware
- Founded: 1983; 43 years ago
- Headquarters: Taipei, Taiwan
- Key people: Hsu Kun-tai, chairman Lin Mao-kuei, general manager
- Products: Desktop keyboards, mobile keyboards, digital cameras, personal-computer cameras and digital video cameras
- Number of employees: 4180
- Website: https://www.chicony.com.tw/

Chicony Electronics Co., Ltd. (Chinese: 群光電子股份有限公司; pinyin: Qúnguāng Diànzǐ Gǔfèn Yǒuxiàn Gōngsī) is a Taiwan-based multinational electronics manufacturer. Its product lineup includes input devices, power supplies and digital image products. It offers desktop keyboards, mobile keyboards, digital cameras, personal-computer cameras, integrated webcams and digital video cameras. It has also been a well known manufacturer of motherboards for personal computers and notebooks.

== History ==
The company was founded on February 22, 1983 and is headquartered in Sanchong District, New Taipei City, Taiwan. As of 2009 it has operations in Australia, Brazil, Canada, China, the Czech Republic, Germany, Ireland, Japan, Mexico, the Philippines, Singapore, Thailand, Taiwan, the United Kingdom and the United States. The company has been publicly traded on the Taiwan Stock Exchange under the ticker symbol 2385 since January 5, 1999. Notable clients have included HP, GoPro, Google, Amazon, Lenovo, Valve, and Cooler Master.

== Headquarters ==
The Chicony Electronics Headquarters (Chinese: 群光電子總部大樓) is a skyscraper office building located in Sanchong District, New Taipei, Taiwan. As of February 2021, it is the fifteenth tallest building in Taiwan and the third tallest in New Taipei City (after Far Eastern Mega Tower and Neo Sky Dome). The height of building is 181.6 m (596 ft), the floor area is 98,458.19 m^{2} (1,059,795.1 sq ft), and it comprises 39 floors above ground, as well as 4 basement levels.

== Leadership ==
Roger Lu has been chairman and CEO since December 2016.

== Financial performance ==
As of 2024, Chicony reported annual consolidated revenue of NT$101.48 billion (approximately US$3.1 billion), with a net income of NT$9.05 billion. The company has shown consistent growth with gross margins exceeding 20% for the first time in 2024.

== See also ==
- Rabbit 286
- List of companies of Taiwan
