= Chicony Electronics Headquarters =

Office building in New Taipei, Taiwan

Chicony Electronics Headquarters 群光電子總部大樓
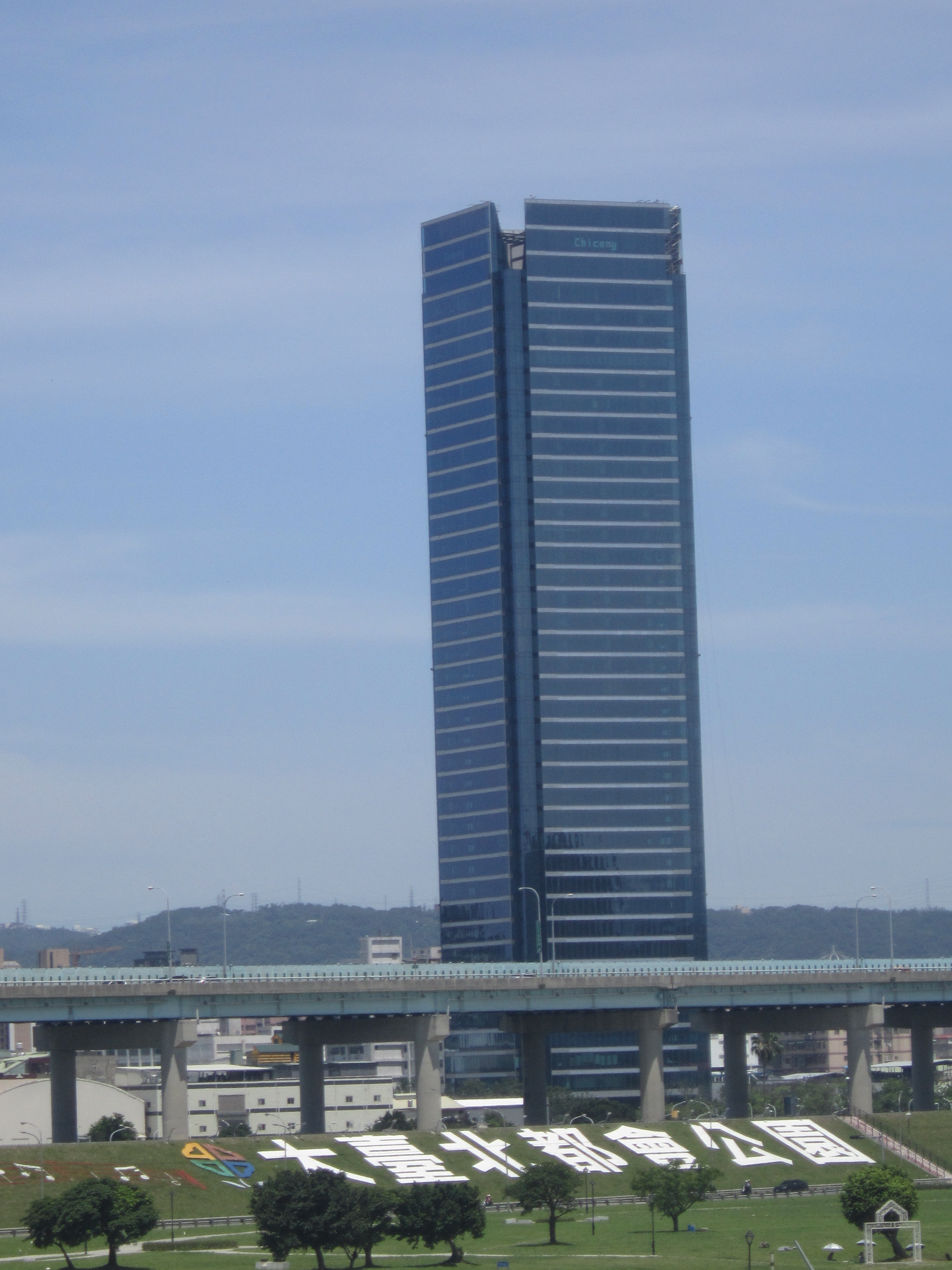
- Interactive map of the Chicony Electronics Headquarters 群光電子總部大樓 area

General information
- Status: Completed
- Location: Sanchong, New Taipei, Taiwan
- Coordinates: 25°3′23.2″N 121°28′21.7″E
- Construction started: Jan 29, 2013
- Completed: Jul 27, 2015

Height
- Roof: 181.6 m (596 ft)

Technical details
- Floor count: 39
- Floor area: 98,458.19m^{2}

The Chicony Electronics Headquarters (Chinese: 群光電子總部大樓) is a skyscraper office building located in Sanchong District, New Taipei, Taiwan. As of February 2021, it is the fifteenth tallest building in Taiwan and the third tallest in New Taipei City (after Far Eastern Mega Tower and Neo Sky Dome). The height of building is 181.6 m (596 ft), the floor area is 98,458.19 m^{2} (1,059,795.1 sq ft), and it comprises 39 floors above ground, as well as 4 basement levels.

== See also ==
- Chicony Electronics
- List of tallest buildings in Taiwan
- List of tallest buildings in New Taipei City
