= Farglory 95rich =

Skyscraper in New Taipei, Taiwan

Farglory 95rich 遠雄九五
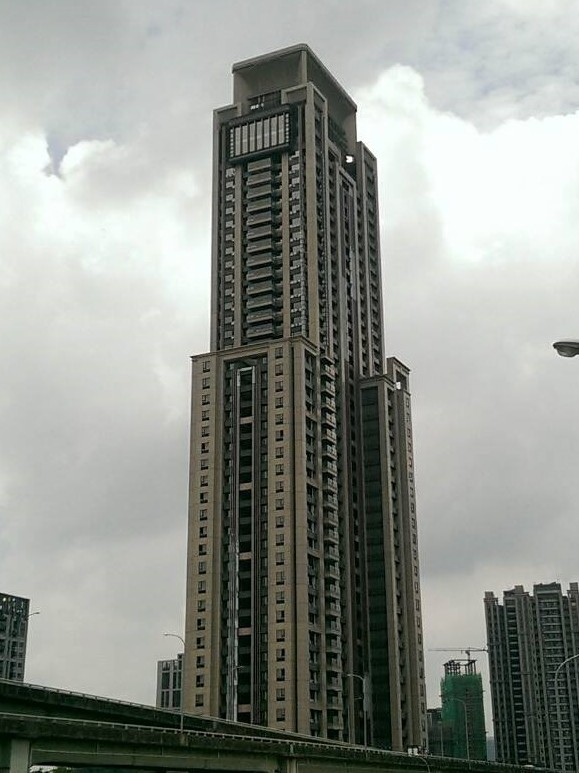
- Interactive map of the Farglory 95rich 遠雄九五 area

General information
- Status: Completed
- Type: Office building, Residences
- Location: Xinzhuang District, New Taipei, Taiwan
- Coordinates: 25.060054°N 121.452093°E
- Construction started: 10 April 2013
- Completed: 30 June 2017

Height
- Tip: 184.4 metres (605 ft)
- Top floor: 168.7 metres (553 ft)

Technical details
- Floor count: 42
- Floor area: 69,637.45 m^{2} (749,571.3 sq ft)

The Farglory 95rich (Chinese: 遠雄九五) is a mixed-use skyscraper located in Xinzhuang District, New Taipei, Taiwan. The height of building is 184.4 m (605 ft), the floor area is 69,637.45 m^{2} (749,571.3 sq ft), and it comprises 42 floors above ground, as well as 5 basement levels. The building was completed in 2017. As of February 2021, it is the fourteenth tallest building in Taiwan and the third tallest in New Taipei City (after Far Eastern Mega Tower, Neo Sky Dome).

== See also ==
- List of tallest buildings in Taiwan
- List of tallest buildings in New Taipei City
