= Skyline Landmark =

Residential twin skyscrapers in Linkou District of New Taipei City, Taiwan

- 長虹天際
- Interactive map of the Skyline Landmark area

General information
- Status: Completed
- Type: Residential
- Location: No. 292, Section 2, Wenhua 3rd Road, Linkou District, New Taipei, Taiwan
- Coordinates: 25°5′0.39″N 121°22′37″E
- Completed: 2014

Height
- Roof: 133 m (436 ft)

Technical details
- Floor count: 36

Skyline Landmark (Chinese: 長虹天際; pinyin: Chánghóng tiānjì) is a 36-story, 133 m (436 ft) tall residential twin skyscrapers located in Linkou District, New Taipei City, Taiwan. Built under strict requirements of preventing damage caused by earthquakes and typhoons common on the island, the complex provides 284 units of luxury apartments with facilities including an outdoor swimming pool, fitness center, garden, and karaoke room. When completed in 2014, the complex was the tallest in Linkou District. It held this title for six years until it was surpassed by Sunland 41 in 2020.

== See also ==
- List of tallest buildings in Taiwan
- List of tallest buildings in New Taipei City
- Linkou District
- Sunland 41
