= Chicony Star Residential Building =

Residential skyscraper in Taiwan

Chicony Star Residential Building 群光之星
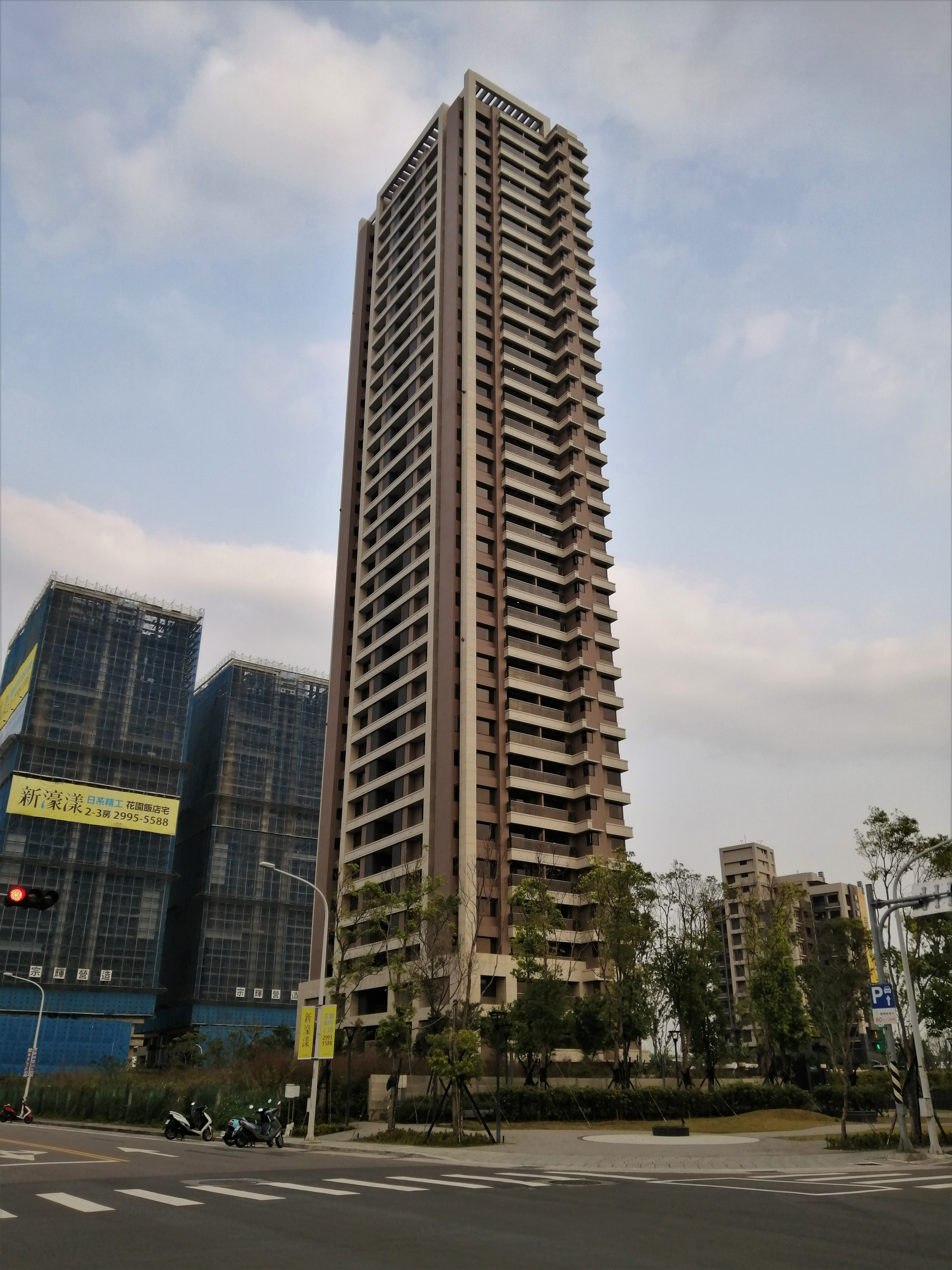
- Interactive map of the Chicony Star Residential Building 群光之星 area

General information
- Status: Completed
- Type: Residential
- Location: No. 363, Shennong Street, Sanchong District, New Taipei, Taiwan
- Coordinates: 25.0554281°N 121.4749938°E
- Construction started: 2016
- Completed: 2019

Height
- Architectural: 136.2 m (447 ft)

Technical details
- Floor count: 35
- Floor area: 28,151 m^{2} (303,010 sq ft)

The Chicony Star Residential Building (Chinese: 麗寶之星T1) is a 35-storey, 136.2 m (447 ft) tall residential skyscraper completed in 2019 and located in Sanchong District, New Taipei, Taiwan. The building has a total floor area of 28,151 m^{2} (303,010 sq ft) and contains a total of 135 apartment units. Construction of the building began in 2016 and it was completed in 2019. The complex was constructed under strict requirements of preventing damage caused by earthquakes and typhoons common in Taiwan.

== See also ==
- List of tallest buildings in Taiwan
- List of tallest buildings in New Taipei City
- Jun Pin Yuan
