= Jun Pin Yuan =

Residential skyscraper complex in Sanchong, New Taipei, Taiwan

Jun Pin Yuan 寶石君品苑
- Interactive map of the Jun Pin Yuan 寶石君品苑 area

General information
- Status: Completed
- Type: Residences
- Location: No. 46-52, Section 1, Guangfu Road, Sanchong District, New Taipei, Taiwan
- Coordinates: 25.051746489840816°N 121.47066921888987°E
- Completed: 2014

Height
- Tip: 123 m (404 ft)

Technical details
- Floor count: 31

Jun Pin Yuan (Chinese: 寶石君品苑; pinyin: Bǎoshí jūn pǐn yuàn) is a 31-story, 123 m (404 ft) tall twin residential skyscraper complex located in Sanchong District, New Taipei, Taiwan. The residential complex was completed in 2014 and provides 200 units of luxury apartments. Built under strict requirements of preventing damage caused by earthquakes and typhoons common on the island, facilities of the complex include banquet halls, conference rooms, a badminton court, fitness center, lounge bar and yoga classrooms. The complex is located in close proximity to Xianse Temple metro station.

== See also ==
- List of tallest buildings in New Taipei City
- Chicony Star Residential Building
