= The Crystal Plaza =

Residential skyscraper in Tamsui District of New Taipei, Taiwan

The Crystal Plaza 水立方
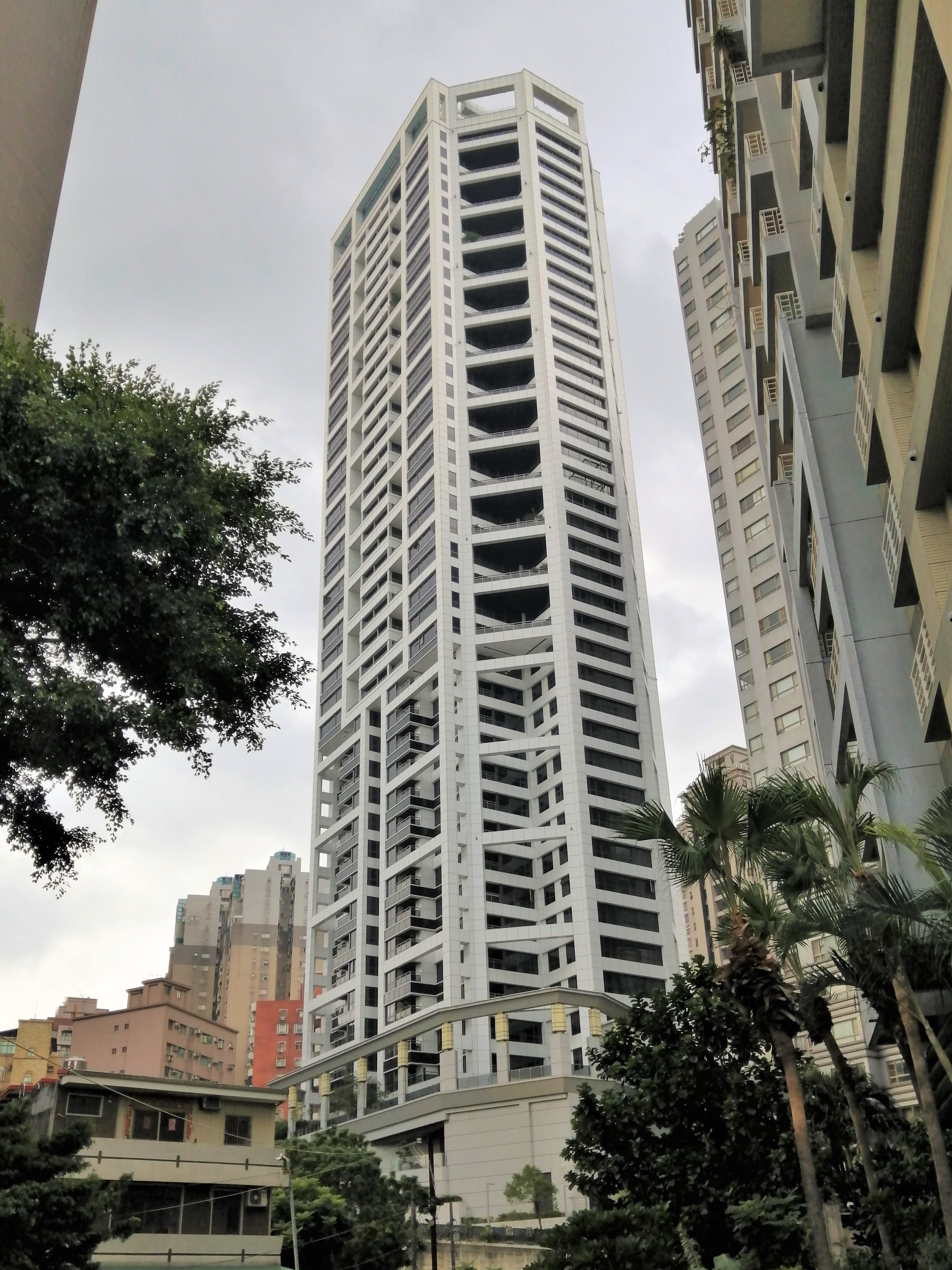
- Interactive map of the The Crystal Plaza 水立方 area

General information
- Status: Completed
- Type: Residential
- Location: Tamsui, New Taipei, Taiwan
- Coordinates: 25°09′38″N 121°27′22″E
- Construction started: 2010
- Completed: 2013

Height
- Architectural: 160.6 m (527 ft)
- Roof: 151 m (495 ft)

Technical details
- Floor count: 41
- Floor area: 60,278.65 m^{2} (648,834.0 sq ft)

Design and construction
- Architect: C.Y. Lee & Partners

The Crystal Plaza, also known as Water Cube (Chinese: 水立方; pinyin: Shuǐ lìfāng), is a residential skyscraper located in Tamsui, New Taipei, Taiwan. It is designed by C.Y. Lee & Partners and was completed in 2013. The height of the building is 160.6 m (527 ft), with a floor area of 60,278.65 m^{2} (648,834.0 sq ft), and it has 41 floors above ground, as well as six basement levels. It is the tallest building in Tamsui.

== See also ==
- List of tallest buildings in Taiwan
- List of tallest buildings in New Taipei City
- Blue Ocean (skyscraper)
- Ellipse 360
