= Banxin =

Banxin may refer to:

- Banxin metro station
- Panhsin Twin Towers
