= Blue Ocean (skyscraper) =

Residential skyscraper in Tamsui District of New Taipei, Taiwan

Blue Ocean 藍海
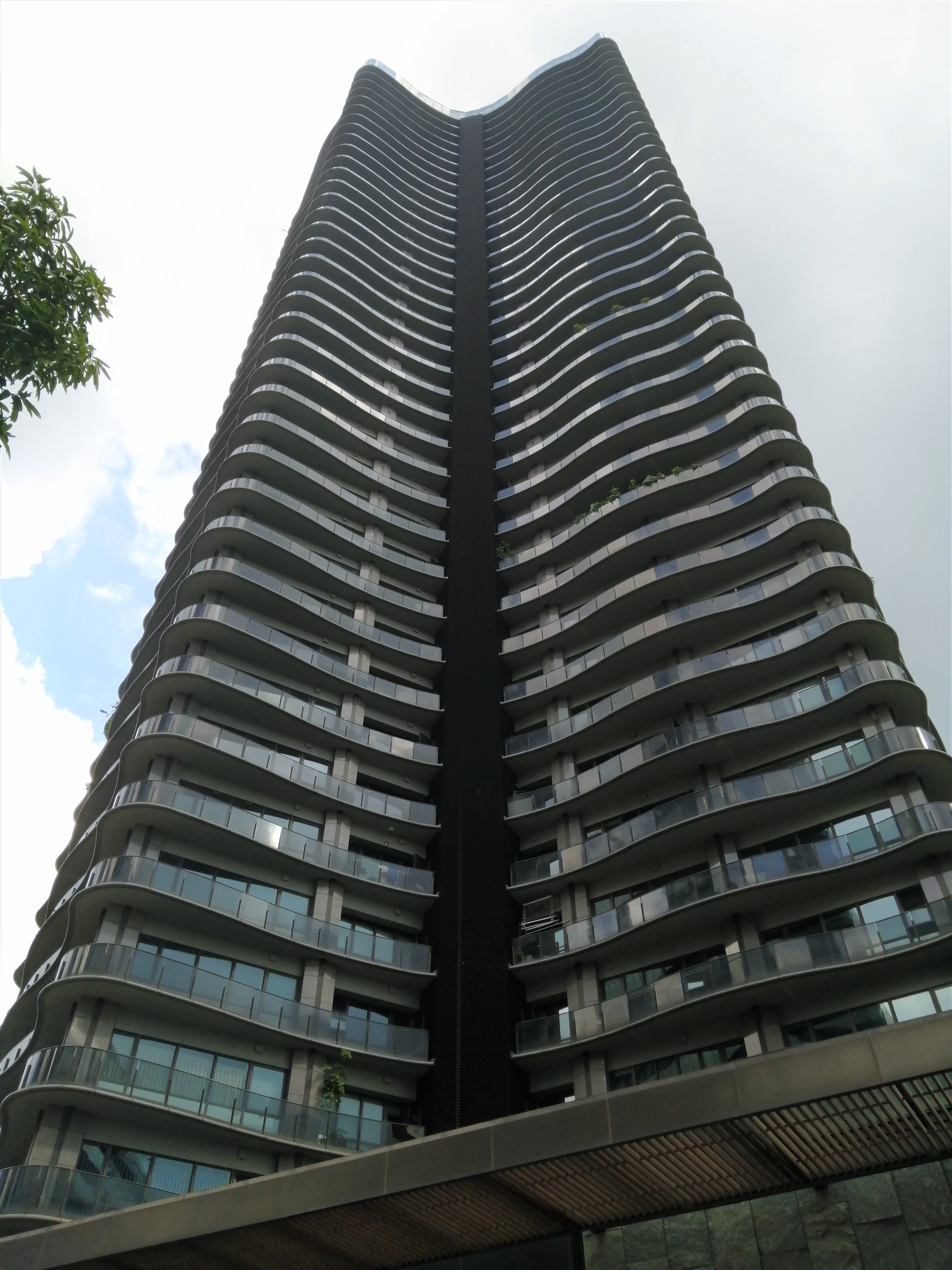
- Interactive map of the Blue Ocean 藍海 area

General information
- Status: Completed
- Type: Residential
- Location: No.111, Section 2, Zhongzheng East Road, Tamsui District, New Taipei, Taiwan
- Coordinates: 25.15155498418008°N 121.46032638623184°E
- Construction started: 2007
- Completed: 2010

Height
- Architectural: 150 m (490 ft)

Technical details
- Floor count: 38

Design and construction
- Architect: C.Y. Lee & Partners

The Blue Ocean (Chinese: 藍海; pinyin: Lán Hǎi) is a residential skyscraper located in Tamsui District, New Taipei, Taiwan. Construction began in 2007 and it was completed in 2010. Designed by the Taiwanese architect C.Y. Lee & Partners, the height of the building is 150 m (490 ft), and it comprises 38 floors above ground, as well as three basement levels. It was the tallest building in Tamsui when completed until it was surpassed by The Crystal Plaza in 2013. The building offers 180 apartment units, with facilities including a banquet hall, two swimming pools and a fitness center for the residents.

== See also ==
- List of tallest buildings in Taiwan
- List of tallest buildings in New Taipei City
- Ellipse 360
