= HongWell i-Tower =

Skyscraper office building in Xinzhuang, New Taipei, Taiwan

HongWell i-Tower 宏匯i-Tower
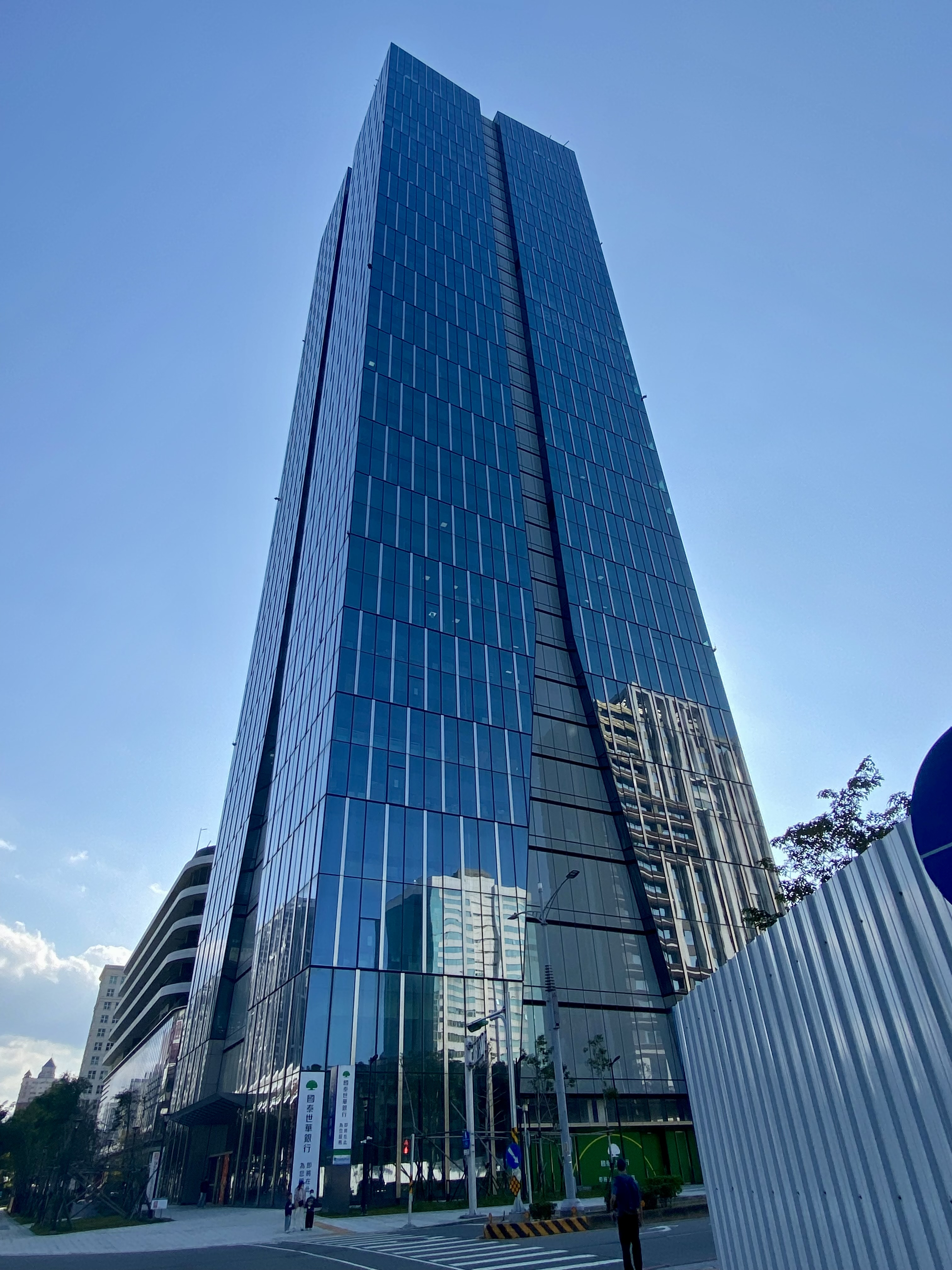
- Interactive map of the HongWell i-Tower 宏匯i-Tower area

General information
- Status: Completed
- Type: Office
- Location: No. 555, Siyuan Road, Xinzhuang District, New Taipei, Taiwan
- Coordinates: 25°03′29″N 121°27′33″E
- Completed: 2021

Height
- Architectural: 180.6 m (593 ft)

Technical details
- Floor count: 39 above ground 3 below ground
- Floor area: 130,988.04 m^{2} (1,409,943.5 sq ft)

The HongWell i-Tower, or HonHui i-Tower (Chinese: 宏匯i-Tower; pinyin: Hóng huì i-Tower), is a 180.6 m (593 ft), 39-storey skyscraper office building located in Xinzhuang District, New Taipei, Taiwan. The building was completed in the first quarter of 2021 and became the sixth tallest building in New Taipei. The building has a floor area of 130,988.04 m^{2} (1,409,943.5 sq ft), and it comprises 39 floors above ground, as well as three basement levels. The building is composed of a podium and a tower. The first to third floors of the podium is a department store and the rest are parking spaces. The main tower is used for office spaces, where the topmost floor will house a Japanese restaurant.

== Design ==
The exterior design is a modern style building, featuring simplicity and refinement. The volume of the tower is divided into four separate block shapes to emphasize the uprightness of the building. The external wall groove design method avoids the monotony caused by the towering volume, and uses this design to shape the night lighting effect. The exterior wall adopts modern glass façade, which adopts a minimalist design by being connected in a modular fashion to create a new landmark in the city.

== See also ==
- List of tallest buildings in Taiwan
- List of tallest buildings in New Taipei City
