= Sunland 41 =

Residential skyscraper in Linkou District of New Taipei City, Taiwan

- 森聯摩天41
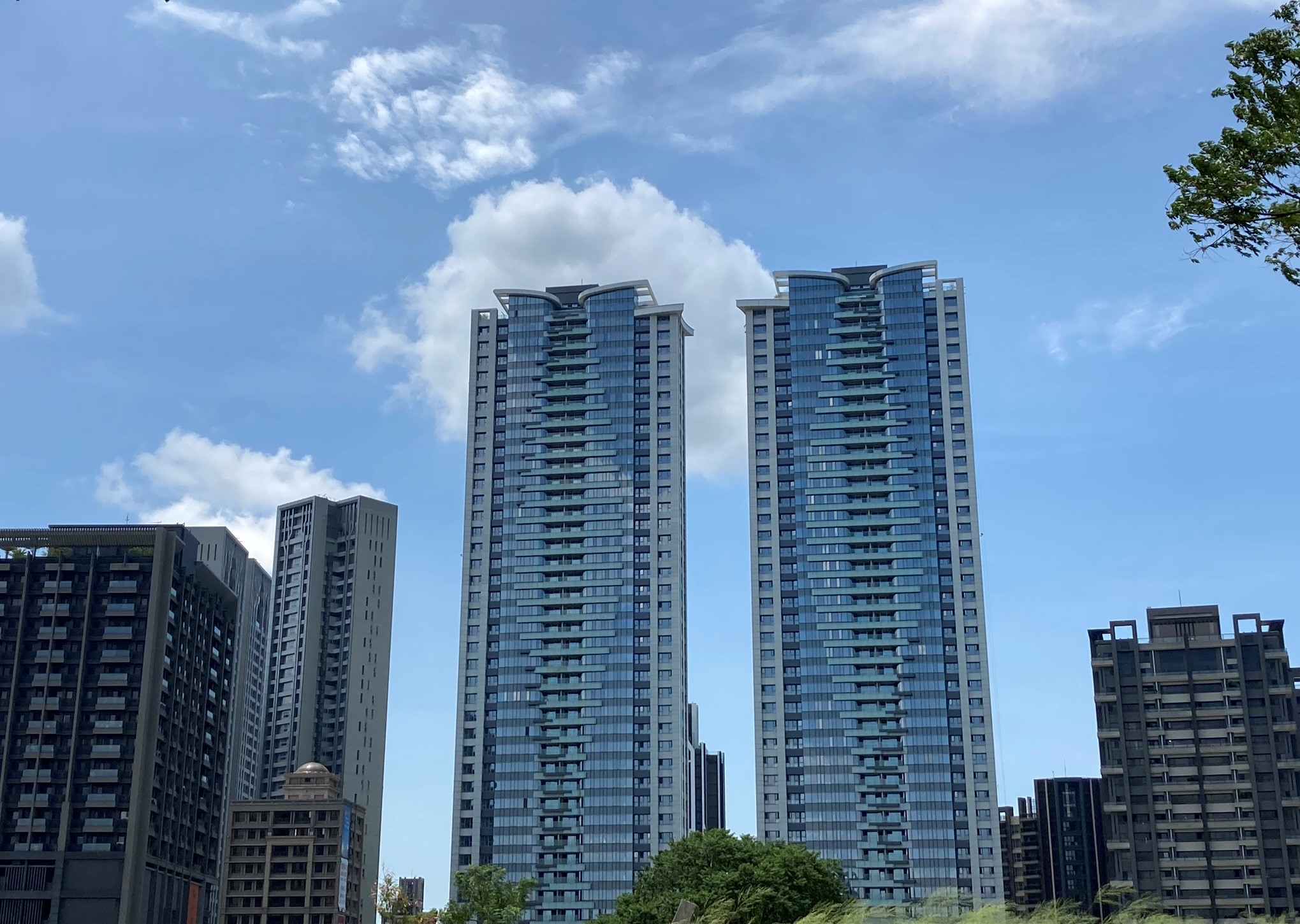
- Interactive map of the Sunland 41 area

General information
- Status: Completed
- Type: Residential
- Location: No. 69-79, Section 1, Wenhua 3rd Road, Linkou District, New Taipei, Taiwan
- Coordinates: 25°04′03″N 121°21′39″E
- Completed: 2020

Height
- Roof: 160.8 m (528 ft)

Technical details
- Floor count: 41
- Floor area: 99,315.48 m^{2} (1,069,022.9 sq ft)

Design and construction
- Architects: Kenzō Tange and TMA Architects & Associates

The Sunland 41 (Chinese: 森聯摩天41; pinyin: Sēn lián mótiān 41) is a complex of residential twin skyscrapers located in Linkou District, New Taipei City, Taiwan. The towers each have an architectural height of 160.8 m (528 ft), with 41 floors above ground as well as three basement levels and a combined floor area of 99,816 m^{2} (1,074,410 sq ft). The towers were designed by Taiwanese architectural firm TMA Architects & Associates and Japanese architect Kenzō Tange and were completed in 2020. After its completion, the complex became the tallest in the district, surpassing the previous title holder Skyline Landmark. As of January 2021, the towers are the ninth tallest in New Taipei City.

== See also ==
- List of tallest buildings in Taiwan
- List of tallest buildings in New Taipei City
- Linkou District
- Skyline Landmark

== External List ==
- Official Website of Sunland 41 (in Chinese)
- Sunland 41 Facebook Page on Facebook
