= Rabbit 286 =

1988 portable computer by Chicony Electronics

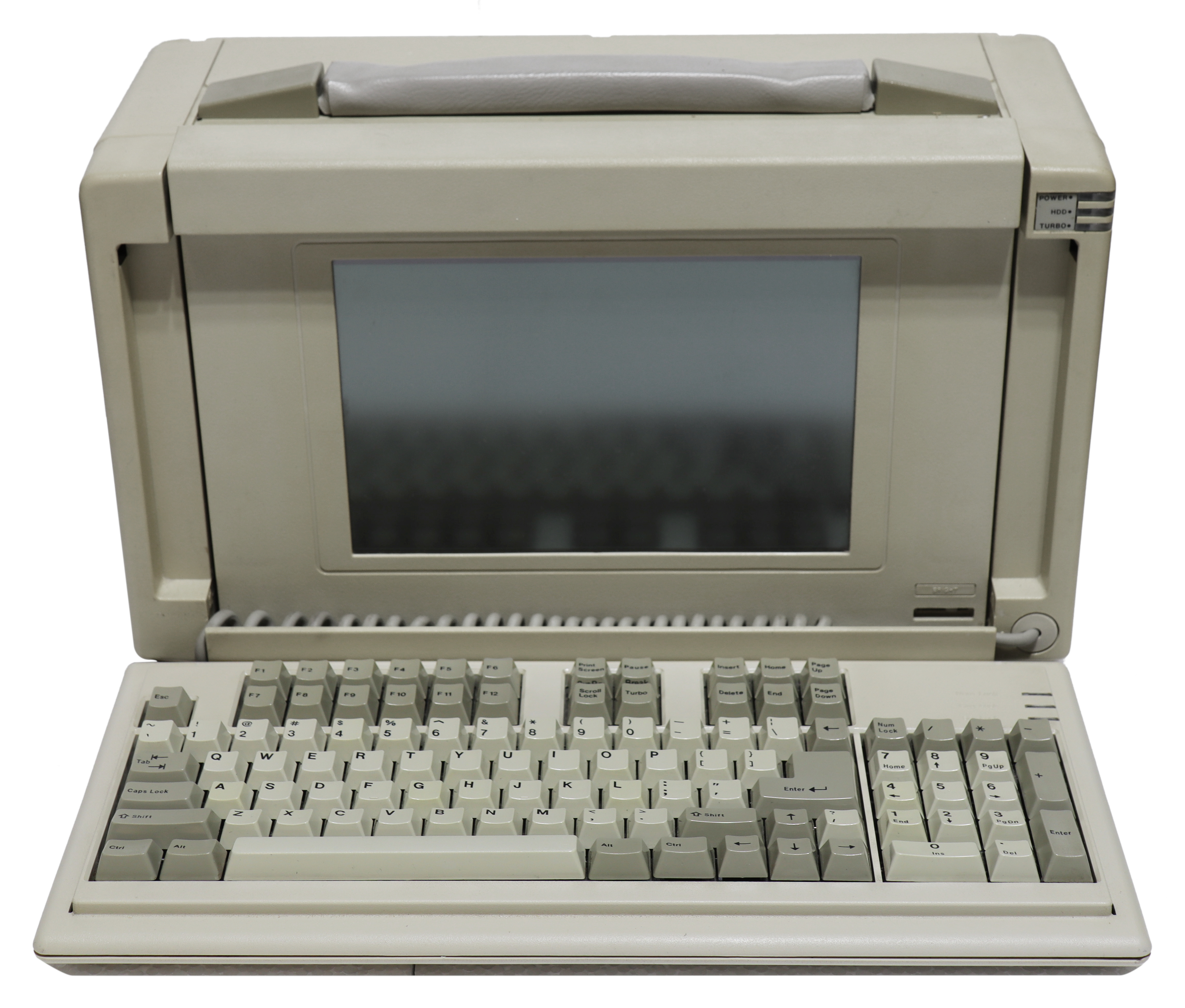
- Developer: Chicony Electronics
- Manufacturer: Chicony Electronics
- Type: Portable
- Released: April 1988
- Lifespan: 1988–1991
- Introductory price: US$2150–2450
- Discontinued: 1991
- Media: 3.5-in, 1.44-MB floppy disk
- CPU: Intel 80286, 6–12 MHz
- Memory: 1–4 MB
- Storage: 20 MB hard disk drive (Model 20)
- Display: 11-in super-twist monochrome liquid-crystal display
- Power: 160 W, 110/220 VAC ～
- Dimensions: 9.45 by 16 by 8.27 inches (24.0 cm × 40.6 cm × 21.0 cm)
- Weight: 17.6–19.8 pounds (8.0–9.0 kg)

The Rabbit 286 is a portable computer manufactured by Chicony Electronics starting in 1988. The computer featured an Intel 80286 clocked at 12 MHz and was available in three models, the most expensive having a 20-MB hard disk drive. The Rabbit 286, which was Chicony's first computer system, was released worldwide in April 1988. Chicony sold a bare-bones version of the computer without motherboard, which saw widespread use among systems integrators and original equipment manufacturers.

== Specifications ==
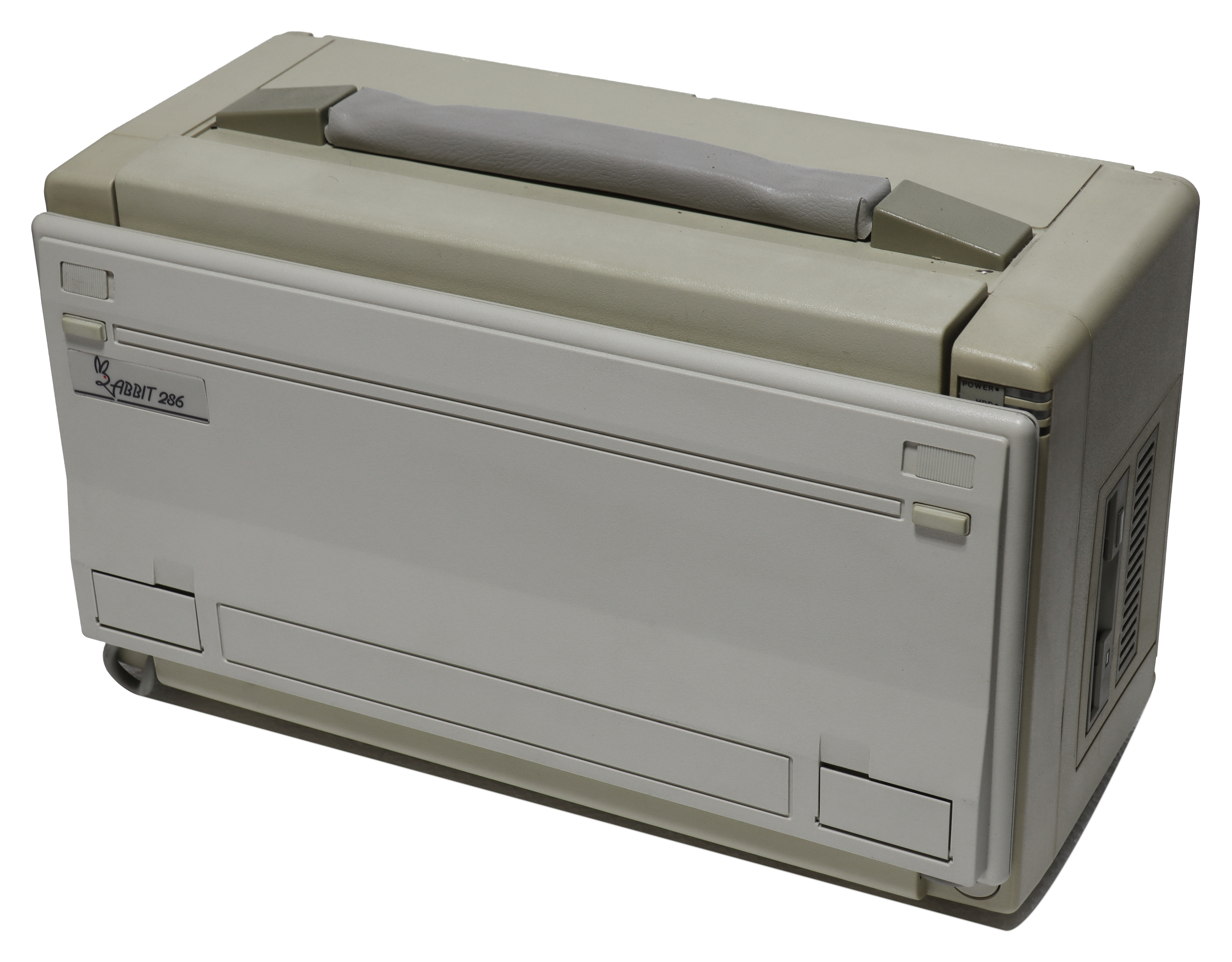
Rabbit 286 with its keyboard attached to the screen

The Rabbit 286 is a portable computer measuring 9.45 by 16 by 8.27 inches (24.0 by 40.6 by 21.0 cm). The unit weighs between 17.6 and 19.8 pounds (8.0 and 9.0 kg), depending on the floppy and hard drive configuration chosen. Its built-in liquid-crystal display measures 9.5 in wide by 6 in tall, or 11 in diagonally. The super-twisted nematic display panel is monochrome, backlit, and has a pixel resolution of 640 by 400. The display housing can be positioned up and tilted for a more comfortable viewing angle. Additionally an external monitor can be hooked up to the computer through the display adapter; the internal display then acts as a double for the user, or it can be shut off by way of a switch on the rear of the computer. External displays supported with the built-in display adapter include MDA, CGA, and Hercules.

For ease of typing, the built-in keyboard has clicky mechanical key switches. The keyboard sports 102 keys—101 from the standard IBM Enhanced Keyboard layout plus an additional "Turbo" key that allows the one-wait-state Intel 80286 processor to be switched between 6 MHz and 12 MHz. The Rabbit 286 has a socket for a 80287 math co-processor, as well as a socket for a real-time clock battery. The Rabbit 286 has two RS-232 serial and a parallel–printer port and offers two open, full-size, 16-bit ISA expansion slots.

The Rabbit 286 was offered in three models. The Model I provided only one 3.5-in, 1.44-MB floppy disk drive and no hard disk. The Model II provided two 3.5-in, 1.44-MB floppy drives, still with no hard disk. The Model 20 provided one 3.5-in, 1.44-MB floppy drive and one 20-MB hard drive (3.5 inches in diameter). All three models included 1 MB of RAM stock, expandable to 4 MB. An external 5.25-in floppy drive—connecting to the Rabbit by way of a 25-pin port—was optional, as was a carrying case with shoulder strap.

== Development and release ==
The Rabbit 286 was the first computer system manufactured by Chicony Electronics, a Taiwanese electronics company primarily known for their keyboards. The Rabbit, which was modeled after the Portable III by Compaq, was targeted to businesses and schools.

Tenative Class A emissions approval was approved by the Federal Communications Commission in early 1988, allowing the Rabbit 286 to be sold only to corporate customers within the United States on its worldwide release in April 1988. These corporate customers were required to purchase a minimum of three units. Class B approval was scheduled to be approved in May, allowing it to be sold for home use in America that month; the Rabbit was already available to purchase for both home and office use in Europe and Southeast Asia in April. Chicony inhibited RF interference through the use of metallic paint applied to the inside of the case, which was manufactured from ABS.

The Rabbit 286 was priced between US$2150 and $2450, depending on the model purchased. Chicony also sold a bare-bones version of the Rabbit 286, called the Model A, which included the case, the 160 W, 110/220 VAC power supply unit, the keyboard, and the LCD and its display adapter card, but no motherboard or associated logic. The Model A, which sold for $700, was targeted to original equipment manufacturers who passed Chicony's qualifications.

== Reception ==
System integrators and OEMs made heavy use of the Rabbit 286 chassis, with Catherine D. Miller of PC Magazine calling it "ubiquitous". Six clones based on the Rabbit 286 chassis were reviewed in the magazine's March 1990 issue. Mitt Jones wrote that, as a positive consequence, buyers could "now buy off-brand machines comparable with Compaq's paradigm for half the price or less". Reviewing the Portacomp II 286-16, a portable sold by Data World based on the Rabbit chassis, Miller praised its ability to display graphics internally and externally at the same time, making it "especially useful for sales demos on the road". Bill O'Brien wrote that Chicony's keyboard was his favorite of all the portables he reviewed. Computer & Software News called the Rabbit 286's case "sturdy". The layout of the keyboard received mixed reviews, with Jones calling it an "awkward configuration at best" and being most off-put by the placement of the arrow keys directly next to the right Shift key. Bill Howard called the splitting of the function row keys into two rows "silly".

Chicony followed up the Rabbit 286 with the Rabbit 286G and Rabbit 286GN in 1989. The 286G retained its predecessor's 12-MHz 80286 but replaced the super-twist LCD with a monochrome plasma display capable of displaying EGA graphics. The 286GN bumped the 80286's clock speed to 16 MHz with zero wait states and featured a NEAT chipset. The 286G had a 20-MB hard drive standard, while the 286GN featured a 40-MB drive.
