= Ellipse 360 =

Residential skyscraper in Taiwan

Ellipse 360 天境360
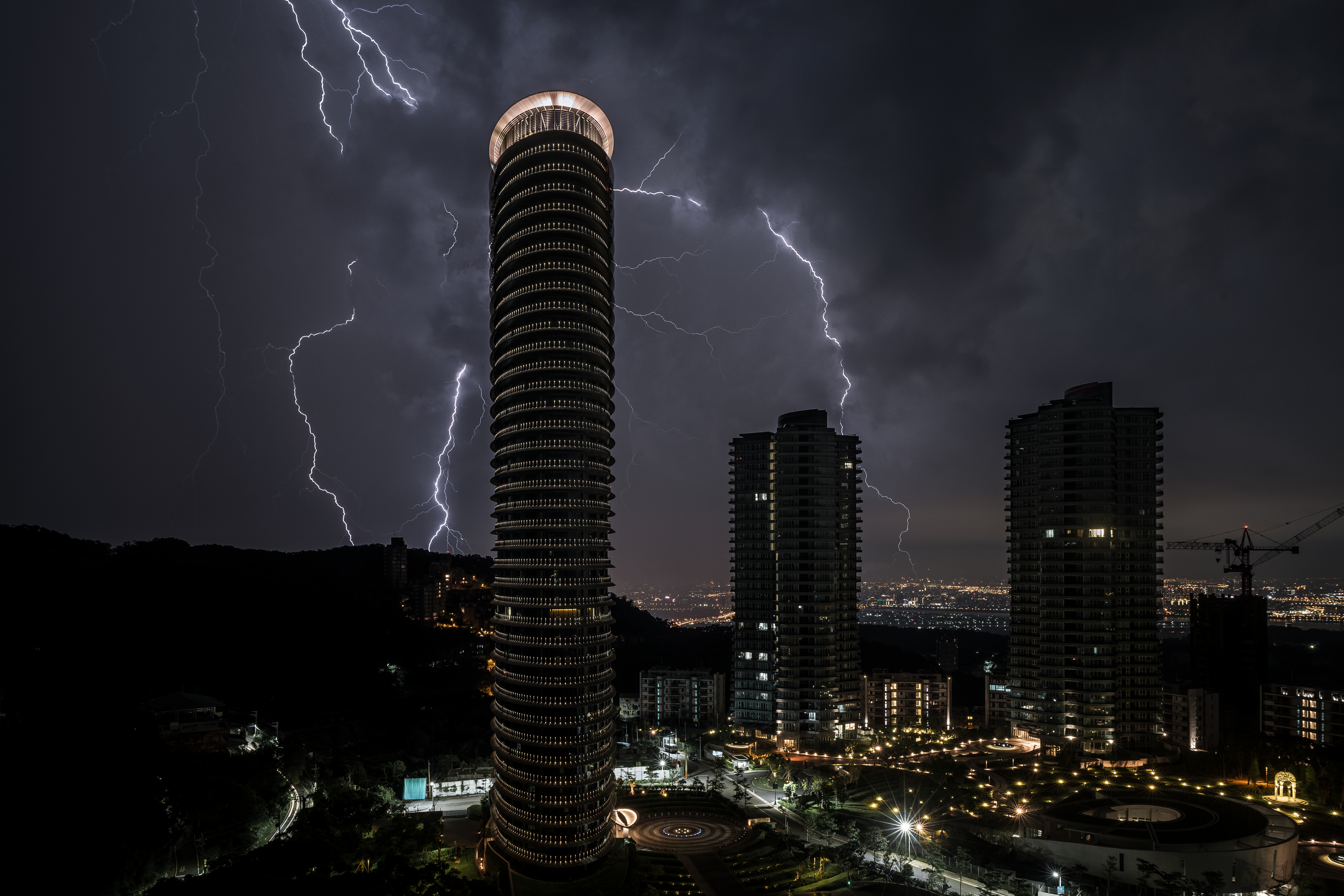
- The Ellipse 360, the tallest building in the photo
- Interactive map of the Ellipse 360 天境360 area

General information
- Status: Completed
- Type: Residential
- Location: No.100, Xingfuliao, Tamsui District, New Taipei, Taiwan
- Coordinates: 25.16479165775372°N 121.48695202639598°E
- Construction started: 2010
- Completed: 2012

Height
- Architectural: 135 m (443 ft)

Technical details
- Floor count: 38

Design and construction
- Architect: I. M. Pei

The Ellipse 360 (Chinese: 天境360; pinyin: Tiānjìng 360) is a residential skyscraper located in Tamsui District, New Taipei, Taiwan. Construction began in 2010 and it was completed in 2012. Designed by the Chinese-American architect I. M. Pei, the height of the building is 135 m (443 ft), and it comprises 38 floors above ground. The building offers 37 apartment units, with facilities including a banquet hall, two swimming pools and a fitness center for the residents. Ellipse 360 is the only residential building in Asia designed by I.M. Pei. The exterior was originally intended to be a circular structure, but I.M. Pei wanted to present a 360-degree view of mountains and rivers. Therefore, the ellipse design was adopted to extend the window surface. Due to the overall elliptical arc, the angle of view varies from location to location.

== See also ==
- List of tallest buildings in Taiwan
- List of tallest buildings in New Taipei City
- Blue Ocean (skyscraper)
