= Panhsin Twin Towers =

Building in Banqiao, New Taipei, Taiwan

Panhsin Twin Towers 板信雙子星花園廣場
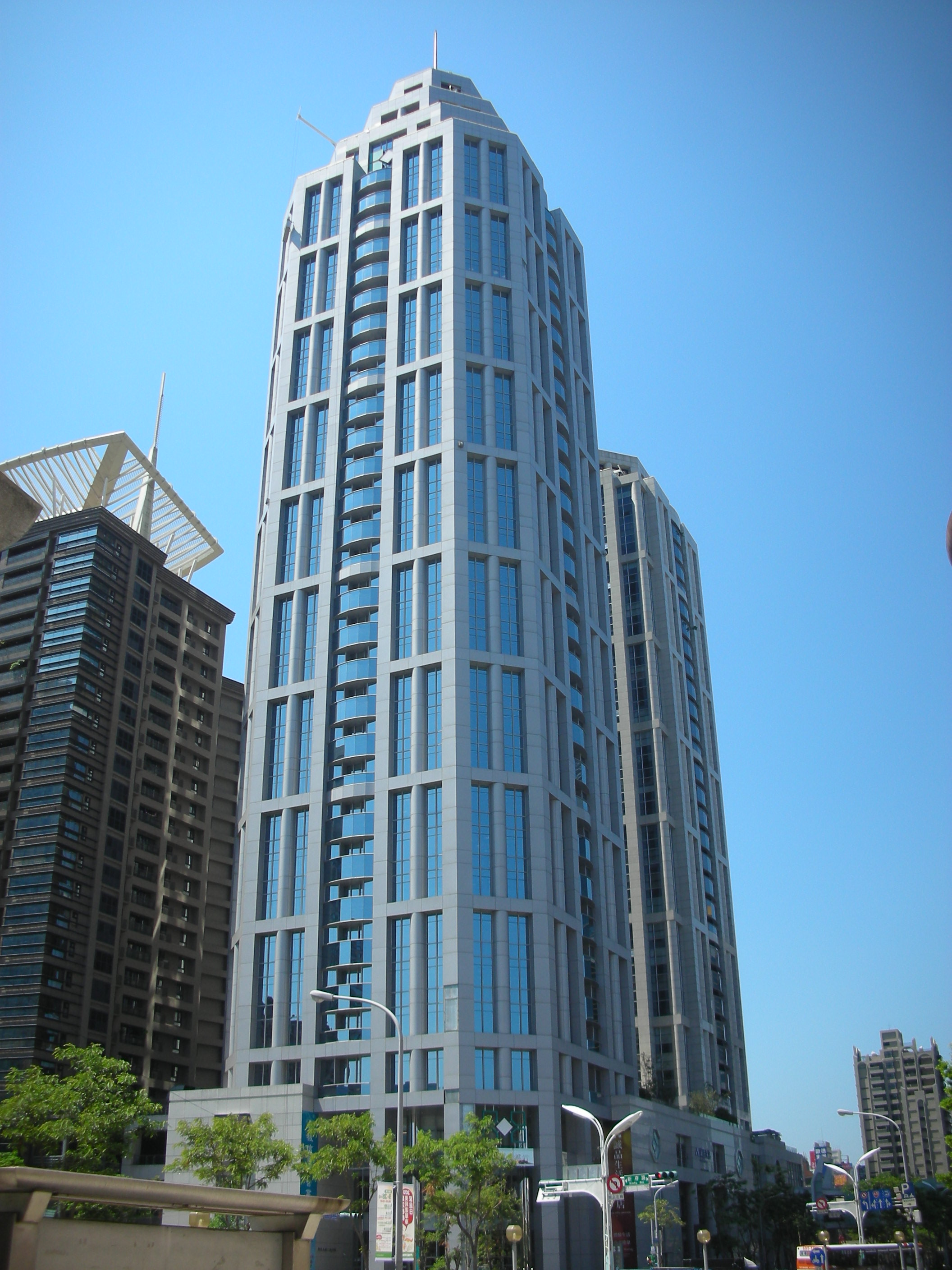
- Interactive map of the Panhsin Twin Towers 板信雙子星花園廣場 area

General information
- Status: Completed
- Type: office building, shopping mall
- Location: Banqiao, New Taipei, Taiwan
- Coordinates: 25°0′44.0″N 121°27′47.7″E
- Construction started: 16 November 2006
- Completed: 8 July 2009

Height
- Antenna spire: 180 meters
- Roof: 144.8 meters

Technical details
- Floor count: 34&32
- Floor area: 100,670.03m^{2}

The Panhsin Twin Towers (Chinese: 板信雙子星花園廣場; pinyin: Bǎnxìn Shuāng Zǐxīng Huāyuán Guǎngchǎng) is a skyscraper in Banqiao District, New Taipei, Taiwan. It is the sixth tallest building in Taiwan and the tallest in New Taipei City. The height of building is 180 m, the floor area is 100,670.03m^{2}, and it comprises 34 floors (Tower A) and 32 floors (Tower B) above ground, as well as 7 basement levels. Panhsin Twin Towers is the seat of headquarter of Bank Of Panshin (zh:板信商業銀行).

== See also ==
- List of tallest buildings in Taiwan
