= Neo Sky Dome =

Residential skyscraper in Banqiao, New Taipei, Taiwan

Neo Sky Dome 新巨蛋
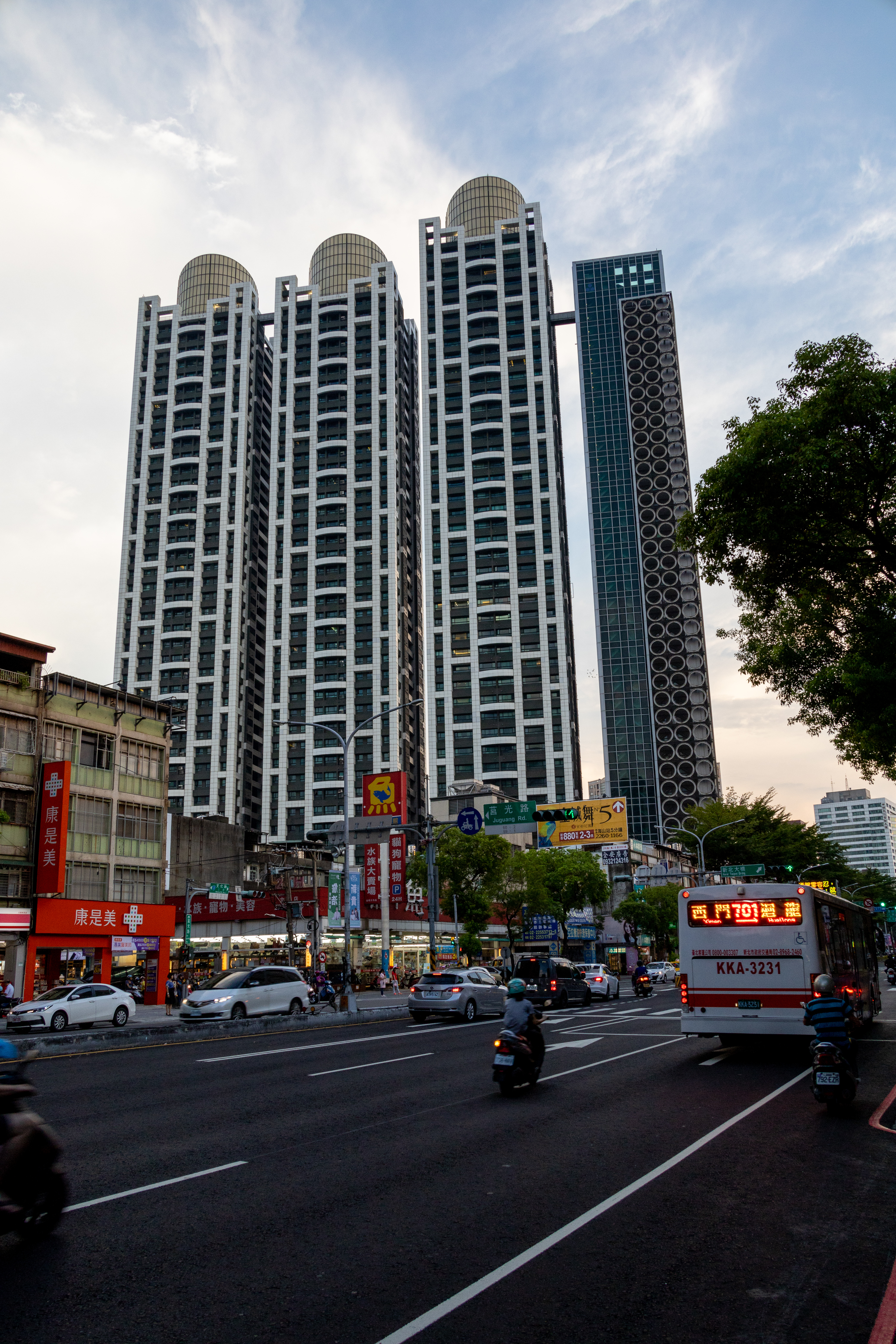

General information
- Status: Completed
- Type: Residences
- Location: Banqiao, New Taipei, Taiwan
- Coordinates: 25°1′24.5″N 121°28′7.7″E
- Completed: 18 March 2010

Height
- Architectural: Tower B: 188 m (617 ft); Towers C & D: 177.57 m (582.6 ft); Tower A: 155.75 m (511.0 ft)
- Roof: 168.35 m (552.3 ft)

Technical details
- Floor count: Tower B: 46; Towers C & D: 43; Tower A: 40
- Floor area: 165,934.98 m^{2} (1,786,109.3 sq ft)

Design and construction
- Architects: P.H. Deng & Associates

The Neo Sky Dome (Chinese: 新巨蛋; pinyin: Xīn Jùdàn) is a residential skyscraper complex located in Banqiao District, New Taipei, Taiwan. The complex comprises four skyscraper buildings completed in 2010, with a total floor area of 165,934.98 m^{2} (1,786,109.3 sq ft) and 1616 apartment units. The tallest of the four buildings is Tower B, which has a height of 188 m (617 ft) and it comprises 46 floors above ground, as well as 7 basement levels. Towers C and D have a height of 177.57 m (582.6 ft) with 43 floors above ground. The shortest in the complex is Tower A, which rises 155.75 m (511.0 ft) with 40 floors above ground.

As of 2020, Neo Sky Dome Tower B is the twelfth tallest building in Taiwan and the second tallest in New Taipei City (after Far Eastern Mega Tower).

== See also ==
- List of tallest buildings in Taiwan
- List of tallest buildings in New Taipei City
