= Far Eastern Mega Tower =

Skyscraper in Banqiao, New Taipei, Taiwan

Far Eastern Mega Tower 遠東板橋百揚大樓
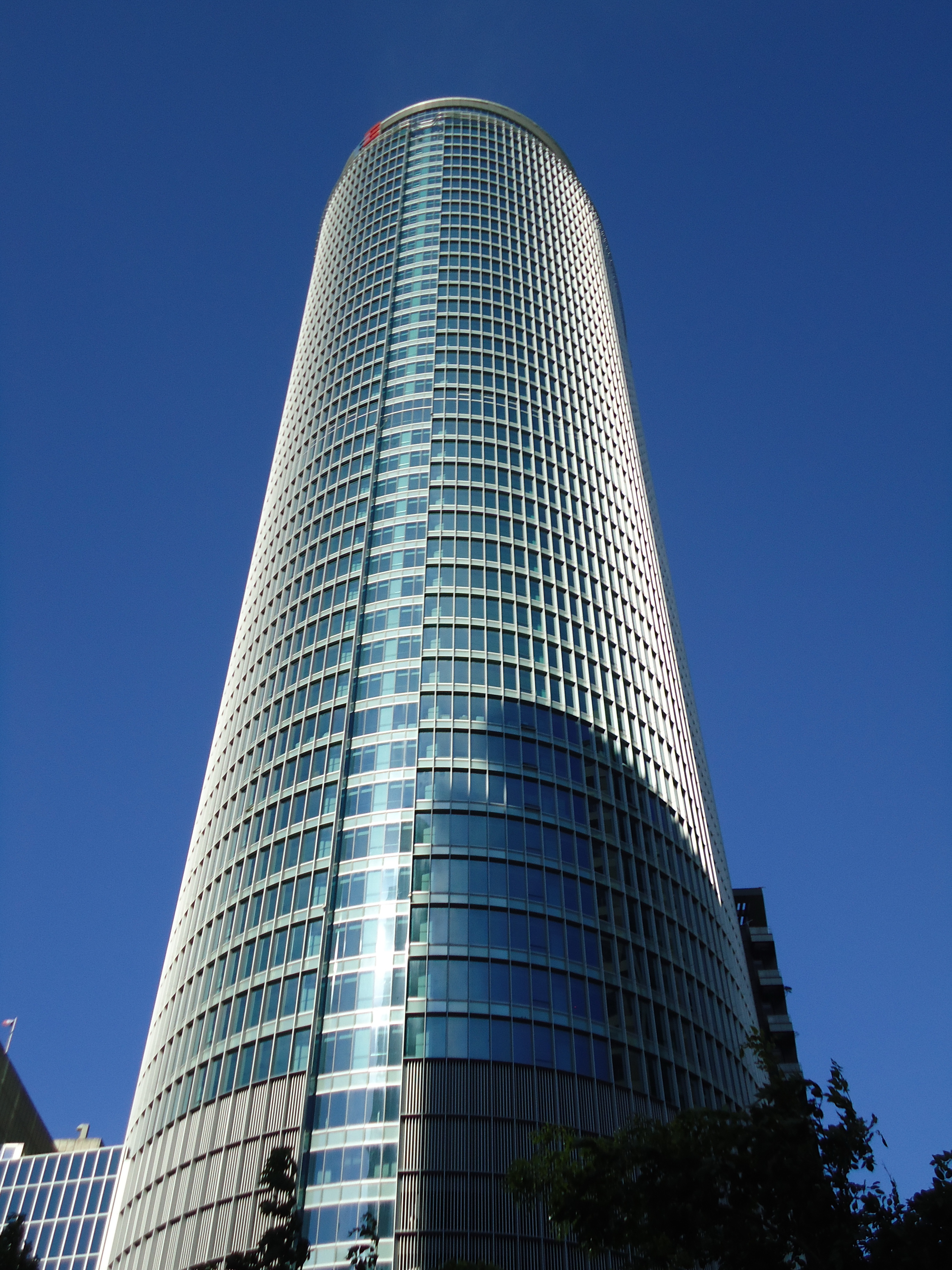
- Interactive map of the Far Eastern Mega Tower 遠東板橋百揚大樓 area

General information
- Status: Completed
- Type: Office building, Restaurant
- Location: Banqiao, New Taipei, Taiwan
- Coordinates: 25°0′46.7″N 121°28′1.3″E
- Construction started: 13 May 2010
- Completed: 1 May 2013

Height
- Roof: 220.6 m (724 ft)

Technical details
- Floor count: 50
- Floor area: 122,929.02 m^{2} (1,323,197.0 sq ft)

Design and construction
- Architect: Kris Yao

The Far Eastern Mega Tower (Chinese: 遠東板橋百揚大樓; pinyin: Yuǎndōng Bǎnqiáo Bǎiyáng Dàlóu) is a skyscraper located in Banqiao District, New Taipei, Taiwan. As of February 2021, it is the eighth tallest building in Taiwan and the tallest in New Taipei City. The height of building is 220.6 m (724 ft), the floor area is 122,929.02 m^{2} (1,323,197.0 sq ft), and it comprises 50 floors above ground, as well as 4 basement levels. Designed by Taiwanese architect Kris Yao, the building was completed in 2013. Far Eastern Mega Tower is the seat of headquarter of Far Eastern Department Stores Co. Ltd.

== See also ==
- List of tallest buildings in Taiwan
- List of tallest buildings in New Taipei City
