= List of tallest buildings in New Taipei City =

New Taipei City
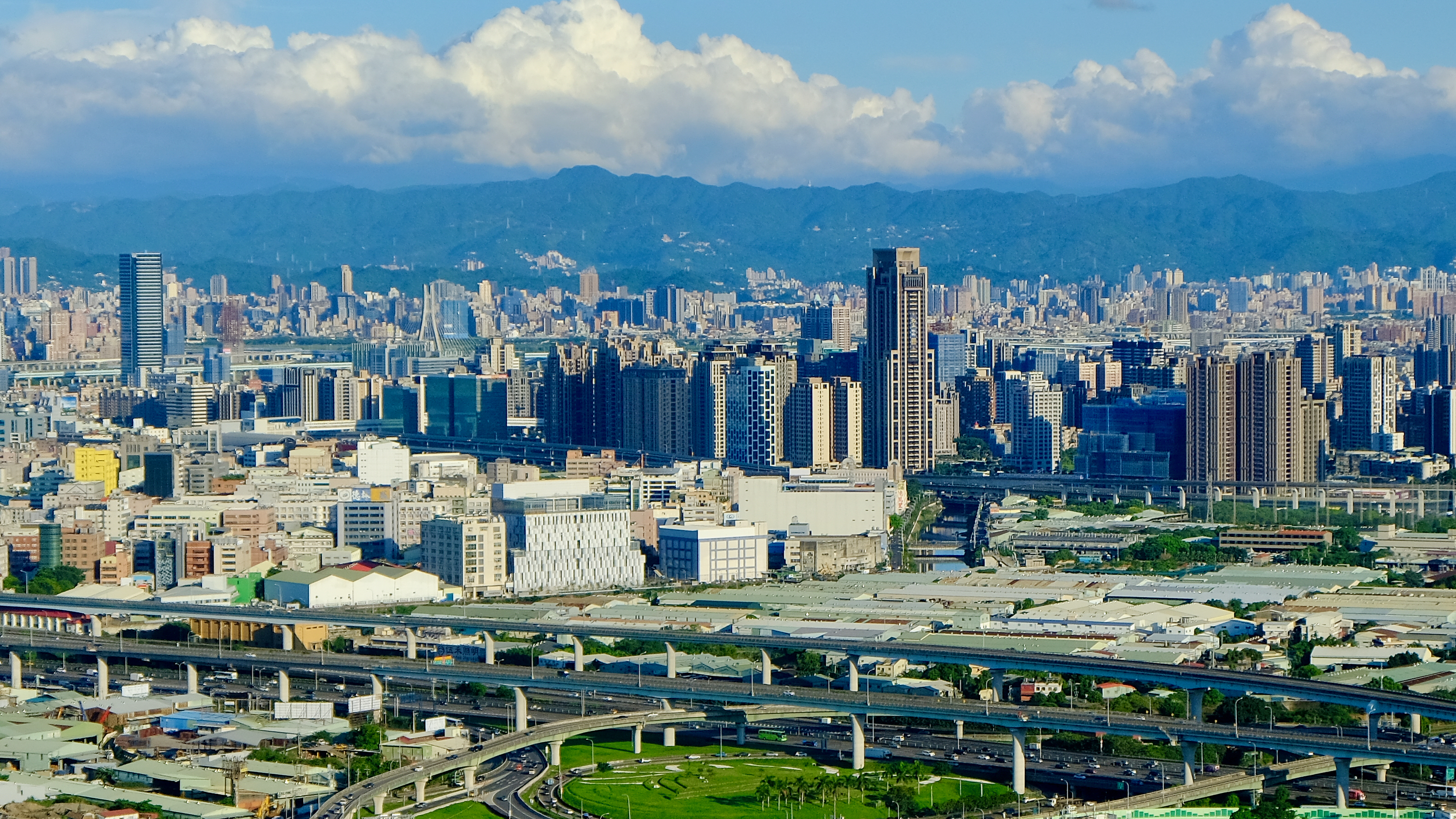
- Skyline of New Taipei City in 2019
- Tallest building: Far Eastern Mega Tower (2013)
- Tallest building height: 220.6 m (724 ft)
- First 150 m+ building: Panhsin Twin Towers (2009)

Number of tall buildings
- Taller than 100 m (328 ft): 126 (2025)
- Taller than 150 m (492 ft): 22 (2025)
- Taller than 200 m (656 ft): 1

This list of tallest buildings in New Taipei City ranks skyscrapers and structures in the Taiwanese city of New Taipei City by height. The tallest building in Taipei is currently the 50–story Far Eastern Mega Tower, which rises 220 metres (722 ft) and was completed in 2013. The tallest buildings are mostly concentrated in the modern central business district of Banqiao District.

== Tallest Buildings and Structures in New Taipei ==
As of September 2020, the list of structures in New Taipei at least 150 meters high is as follows according to SkyscraperPage and the Council on Tall Buildings and Urban Habitat. An equal sign (=) following a rank indicates the same height between two or more buildings. The "Year" column indicates the year of completion. The list also includes structures such as observation towers, radio masts, transmission towers and chimneys.

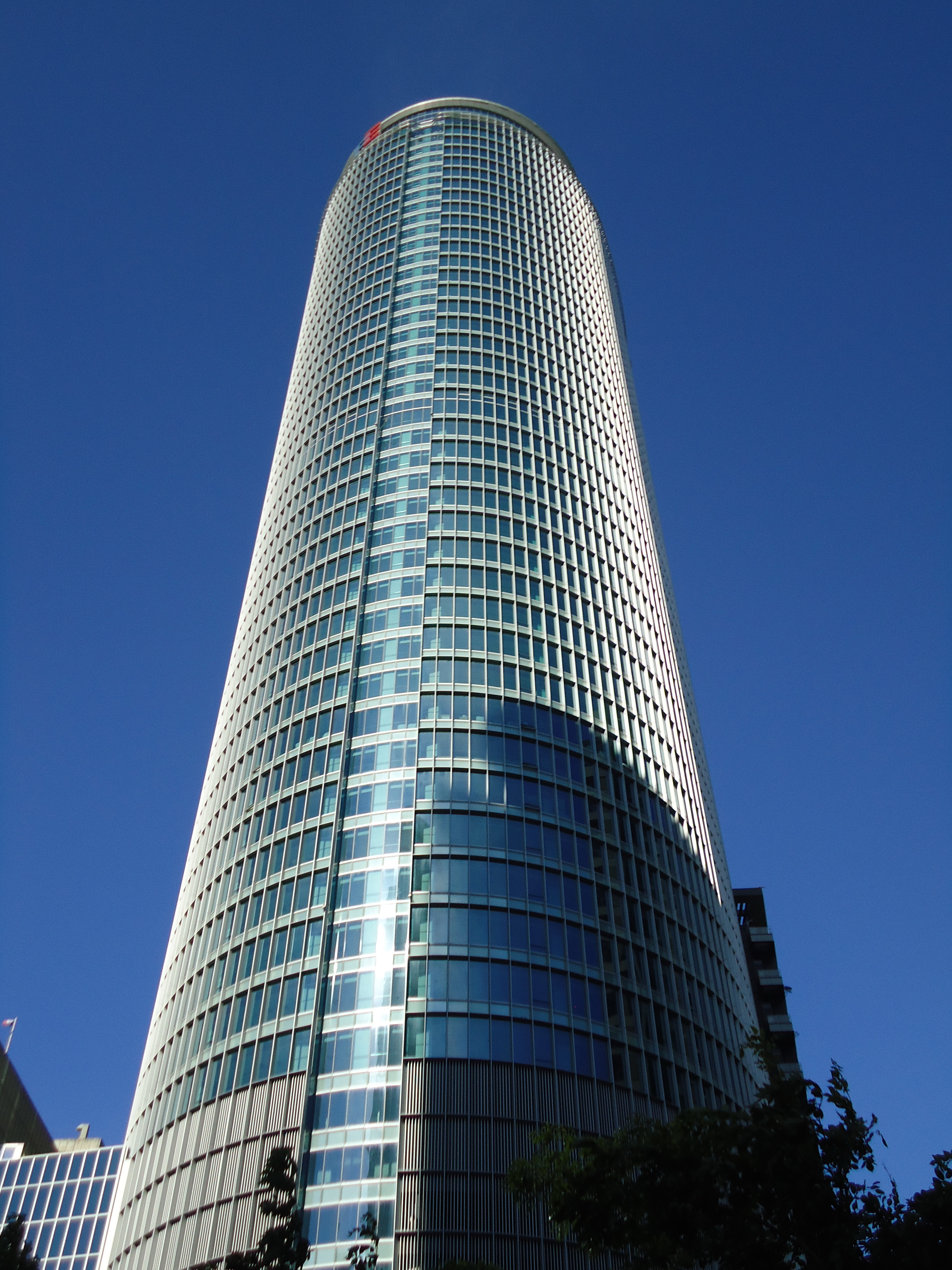
Far Eastern Mega Tower

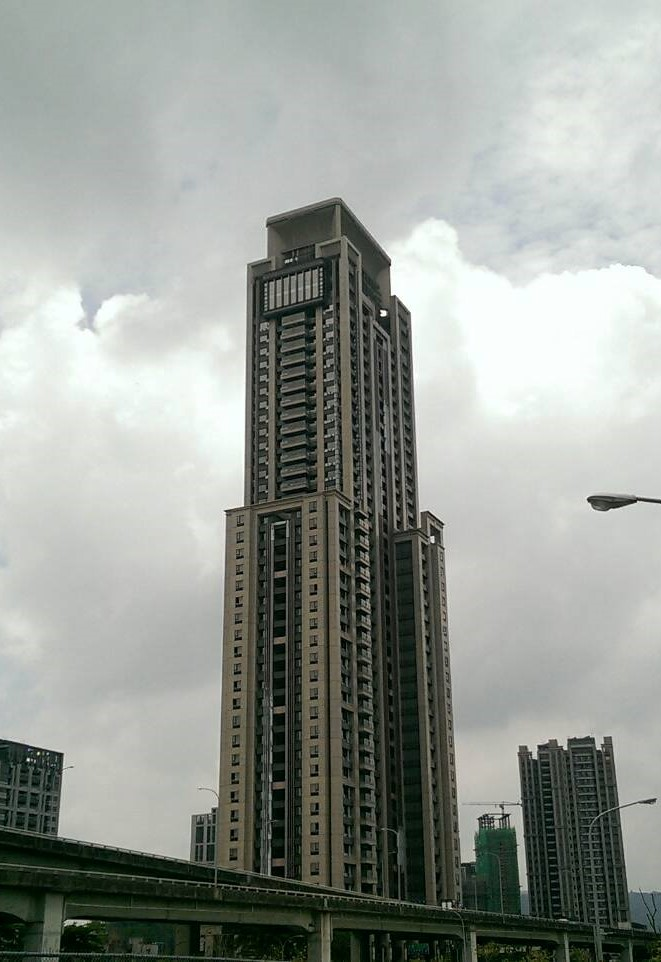
Farglory 95rich

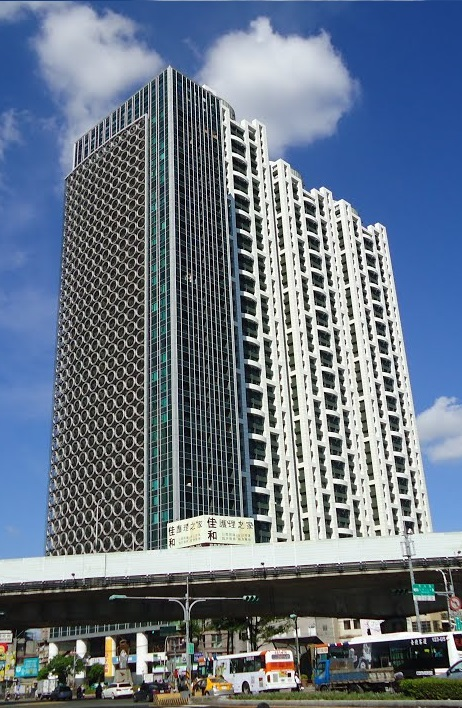
Neo Sky Dome

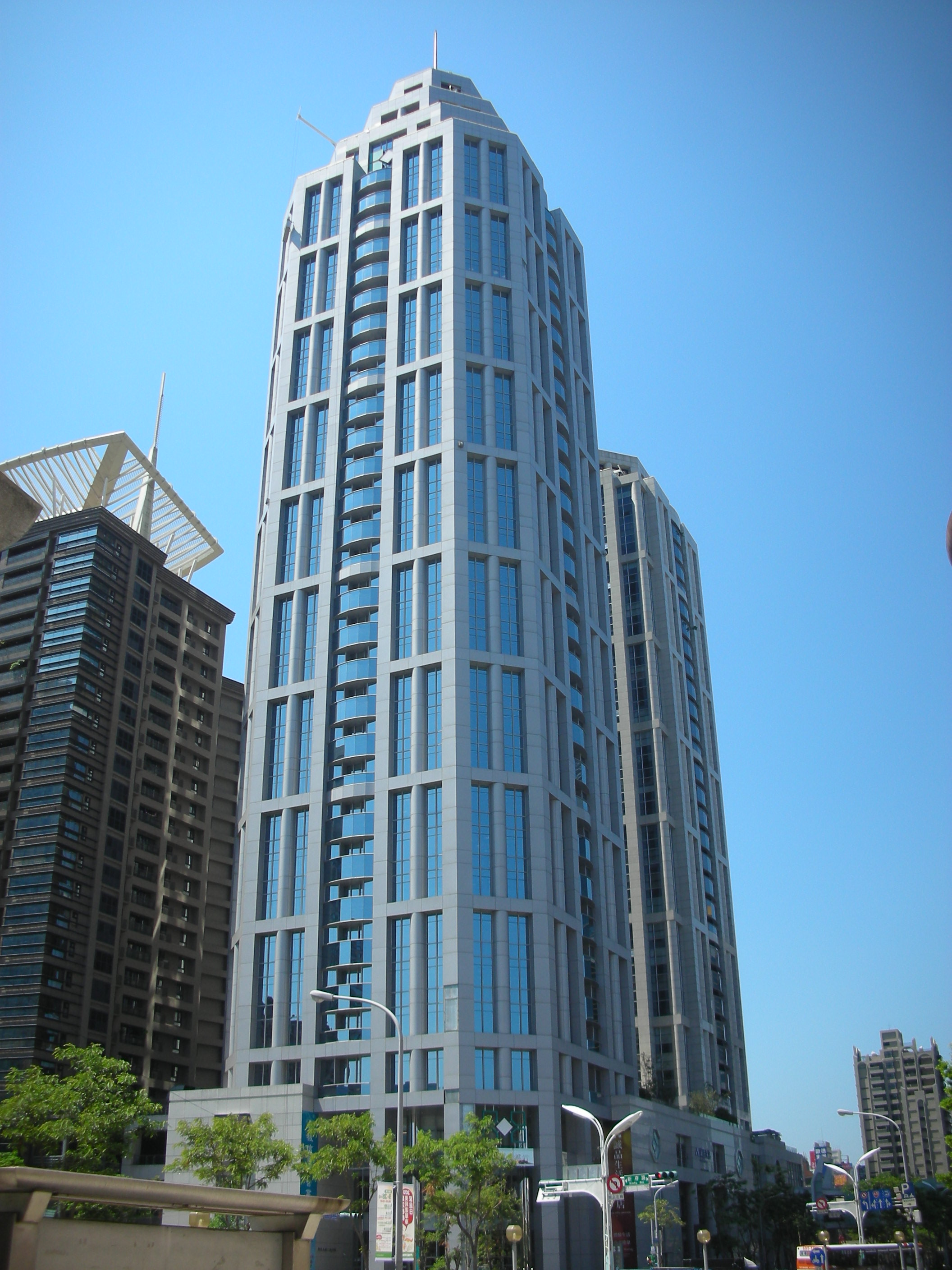
Panhsin Twin Towers

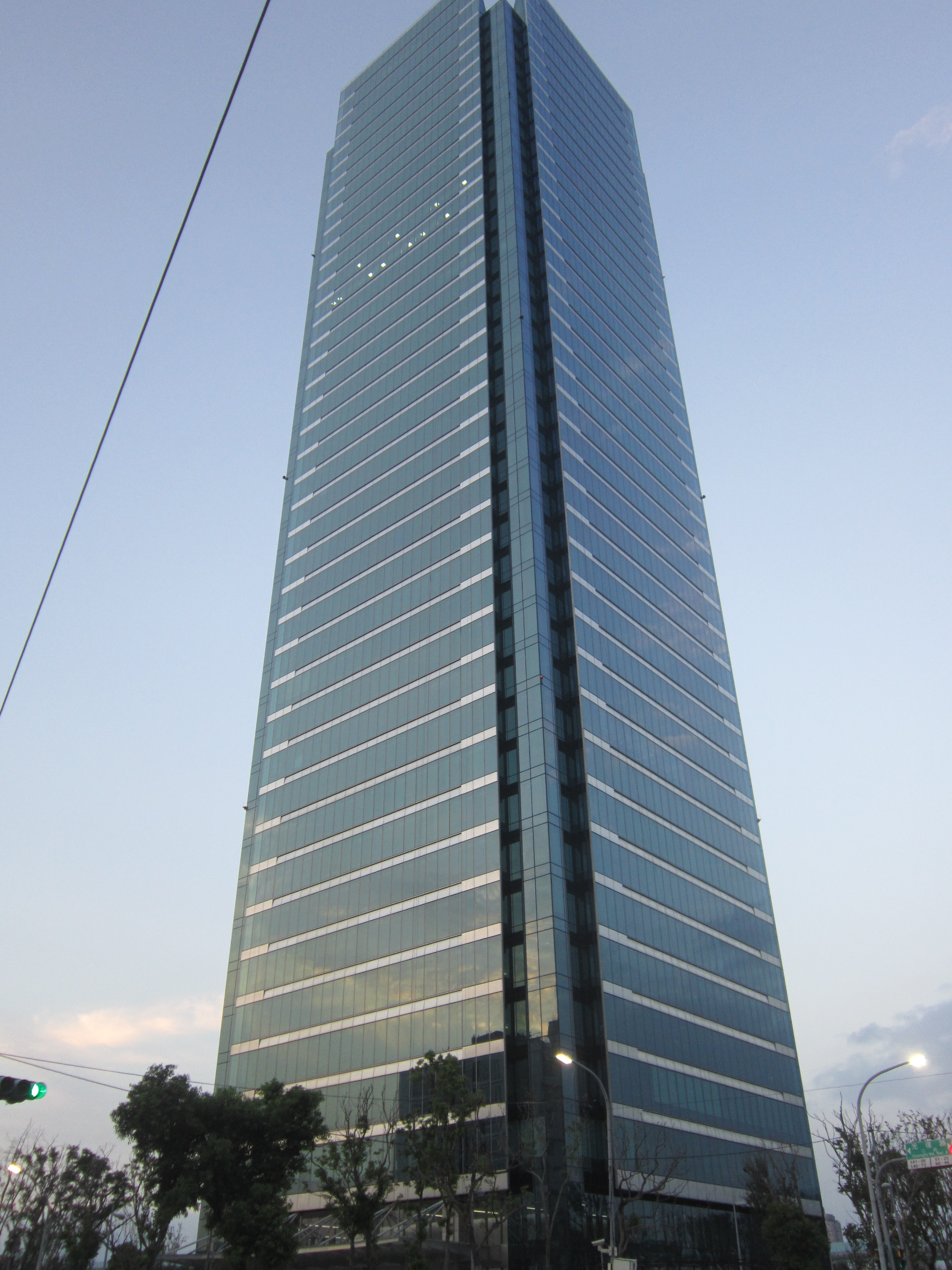
Chicony Electronics Headquarters

Rank	Name	Height	Floors	Year	District	Ref
1	Far Eastern Mega Tower (百揚大樓)	220.6 m	50	2013	Banqiao	
-	Pylon of Danjiang Bridge (淡江大橋橋塔)	200 m	-	2026	Tamsui	
2	Eastern Group Headquarters (東森恩典大樓)	199 m	38	2026	Linkou	
3	Neo Sky Dome Block B (新巨蛋 B棟)	188 m	46	2010	Banqiao	
4	Farglory 95rich (遠雄九五)	184 m	42	2017	Xinzhuang	
5	Chicony Electronics Headquarters (群光電子總部大樓)	181 m	39	2015	Sanchong	
6	HongWell i-Tower (宏匯i-Tower)	180.6 m	39	2021	Xinzhuang	
7	Panhsin Twin Towers (板信雙子星花園廣場)	180 m	34	2009	Banqiao	
8	Neo Sky Dome Block C (新巨蛋 C棟)	177.5 m	43	2010	Banqiao	
8=	Neo Sky Dome Block D (新巨蛋 D棟)	177.5 m	43	2010	Banqiao	
10	Le M Residence (馥華艾美)	172 m	46	2025	Banqiao	
-	Chimney of Linkou Power Plant (林口發電廠煙囪)	168 m	-	2014	Linkou	
11	Sunland 41 Tower A (森聯摩天41 A棟)	160.8 m	41	2020	Linkou	
11=	Sunland 41 Tower B (森聯摩天41 B棟)	160.8 m	41	2020	Linkou	
13	Farglory U-Town Tower B (汐止遠雄U-TOWN B棟)	160 m	37	2014	Xizhi	
13=	Farglory U-Town Tower C (汐止遠雄U-TOWN C棟)	160 m	34	2018	Xizhi	
13=	The Crystal Plaza (淡水水立方)	160 m	41	2012	Tamsui	
16	He-huan Landmark Tower A (合環Landmark A棟)	157 m	42	2026	Xindian	
16=	He-huan Landmark Tower B (合環Landmark B棟)	157 m	42	2026	Xindian	
18	Neo Sky Dome Block A (新巨蛋 A棟)	156 m	40	2010	Banqiao	
19	Tuntex Highrise Building (摩天東帝市)	153 m	41	1998	Zhonghe	
20	Farglory U-Town Tower D (汐止遠雄U-TOWN D棟)	151.8 m	37	2014	Xizhi	
20=	Farglory U-Town Tower A (汐止遠雄U-TOWN A棟)	151.8 m	37	2014	Xizhi	
-	Chimney of Bali Refuse Incineration Plant (八里垃圾焚化廠煙囪)	150.5 m	-	1998	Bali	
22	Blue Ocean (藍海)	150 m	38	2010	Tamsui	

== Tallest Buildings by District ==
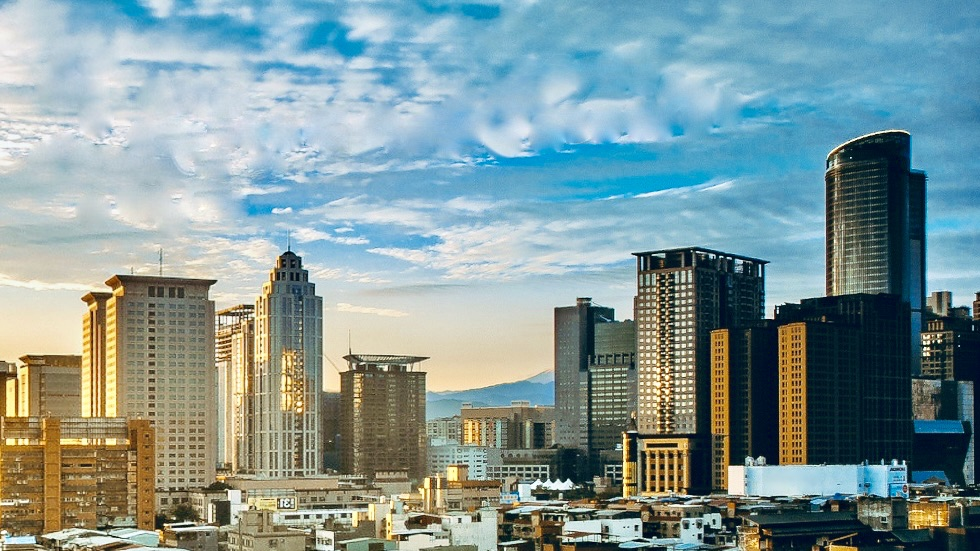
Banqiao

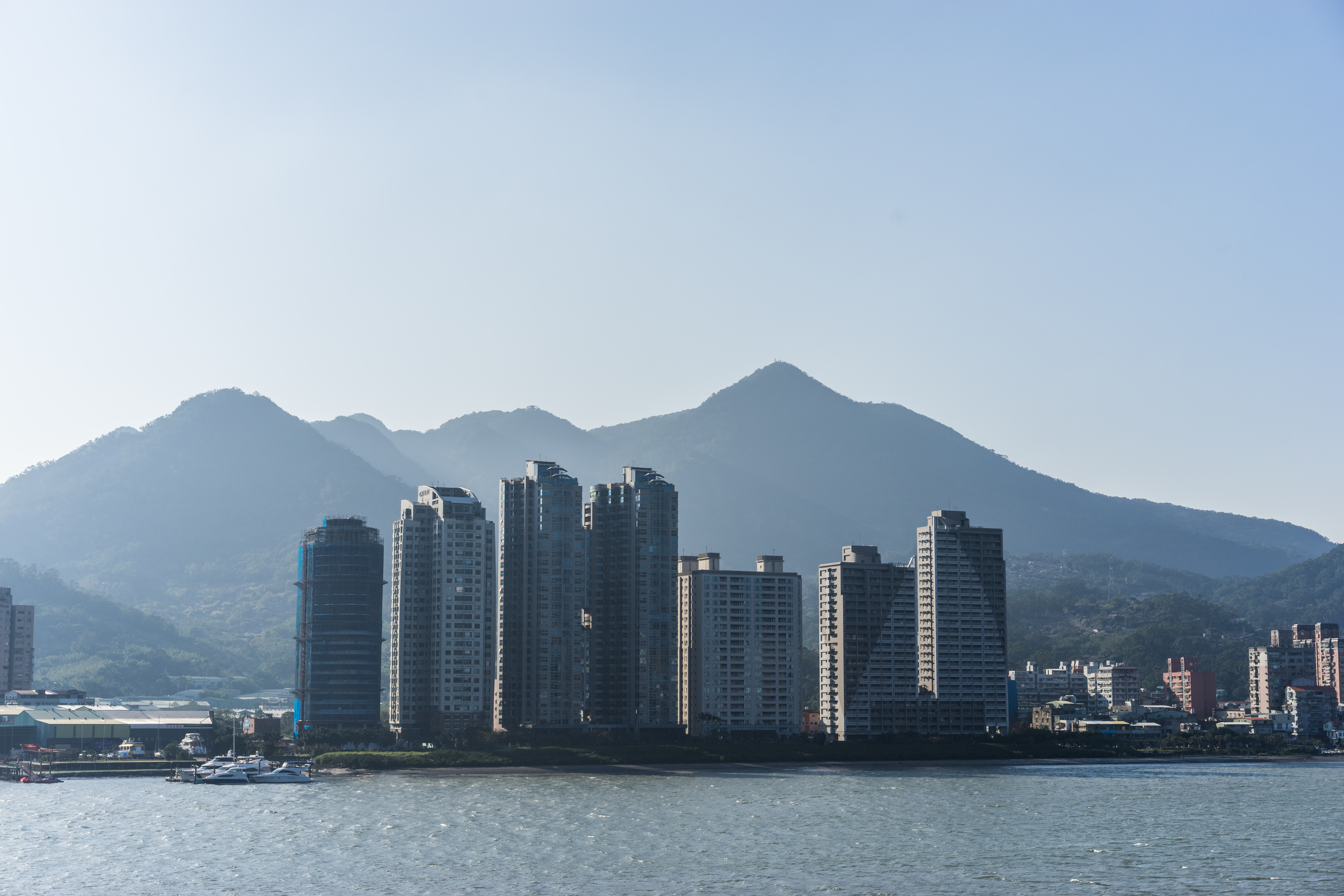
Bali

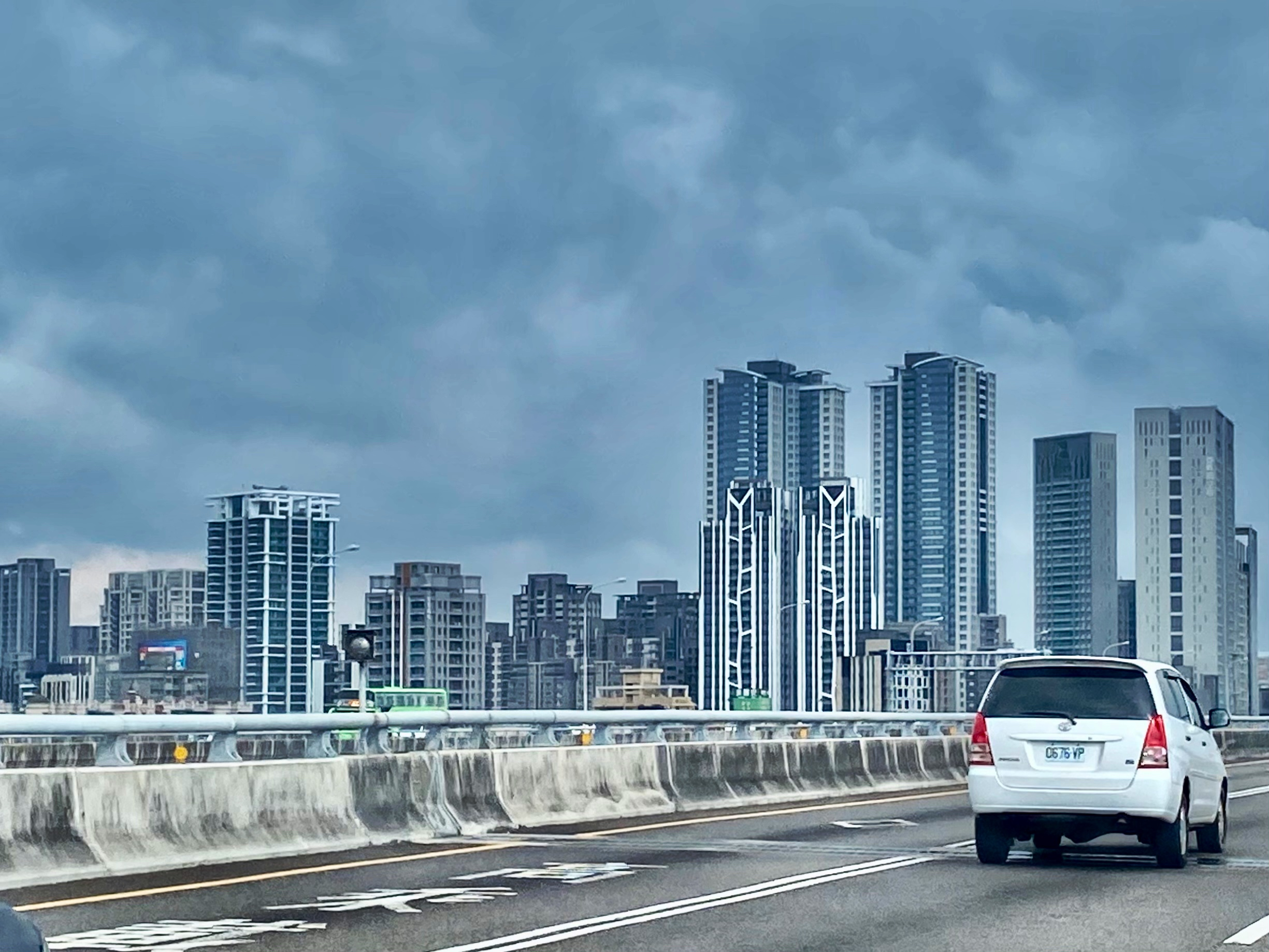
Linkou

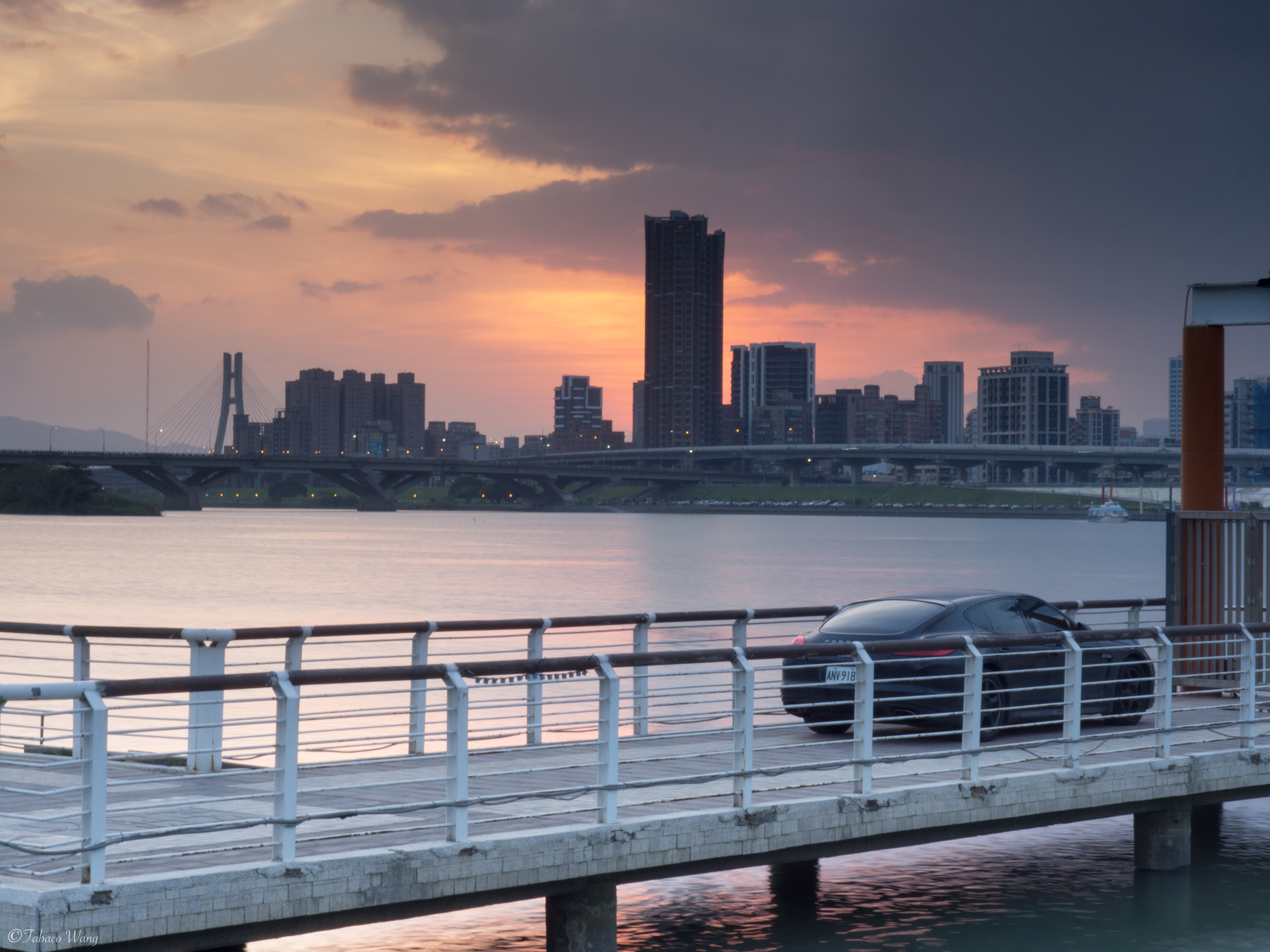
Sanchong

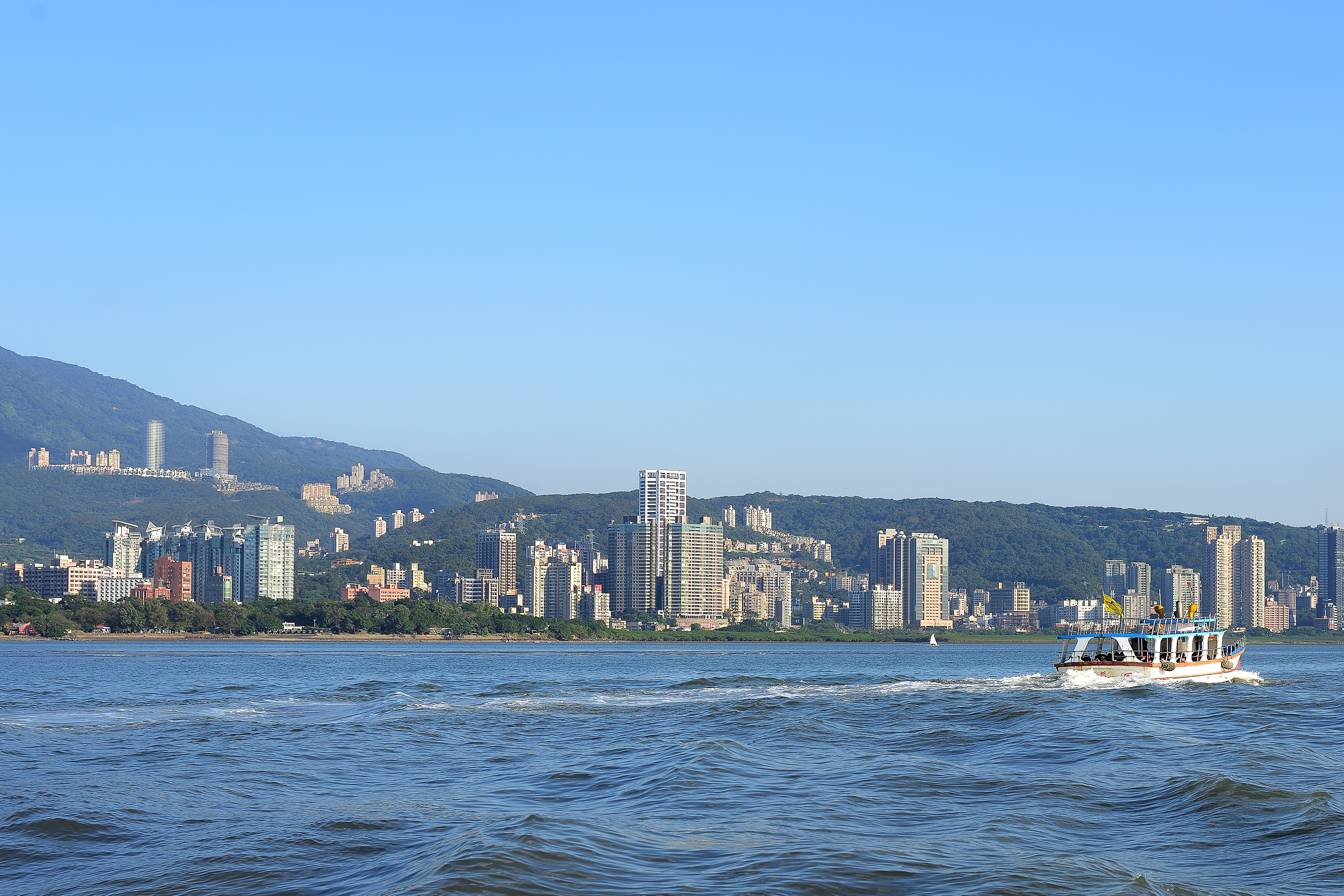
Tamsui

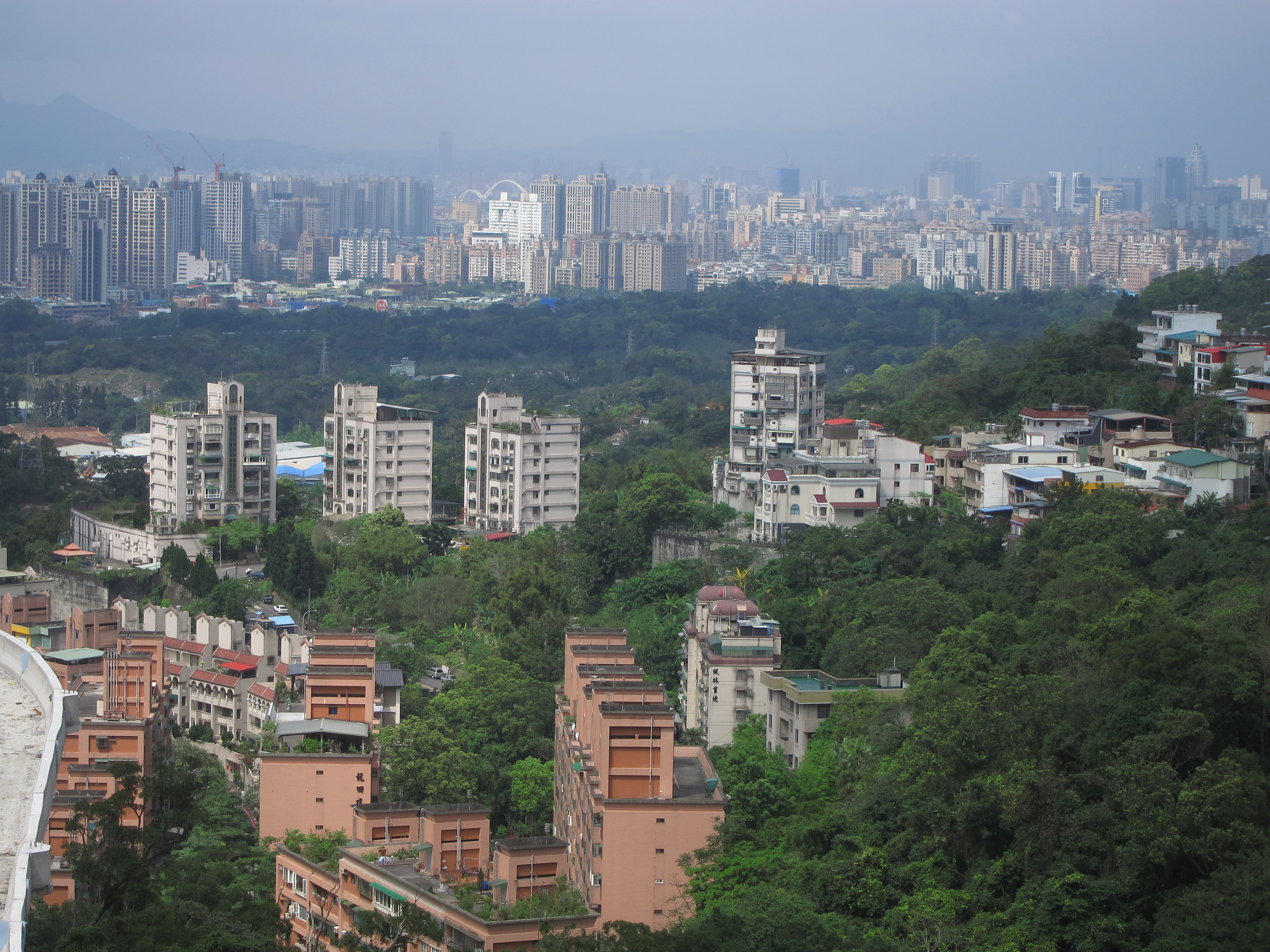
Tucheng

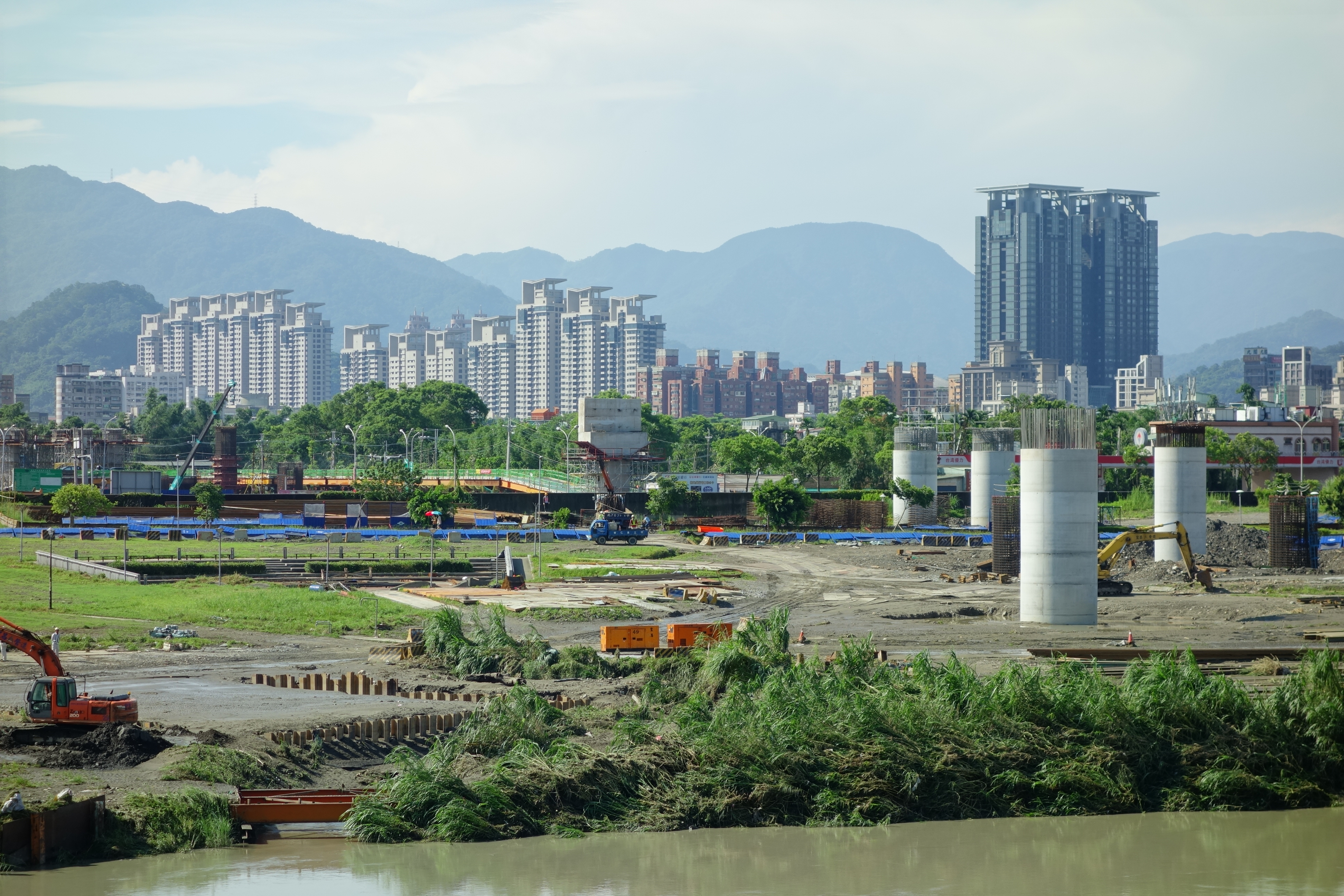
Xindian

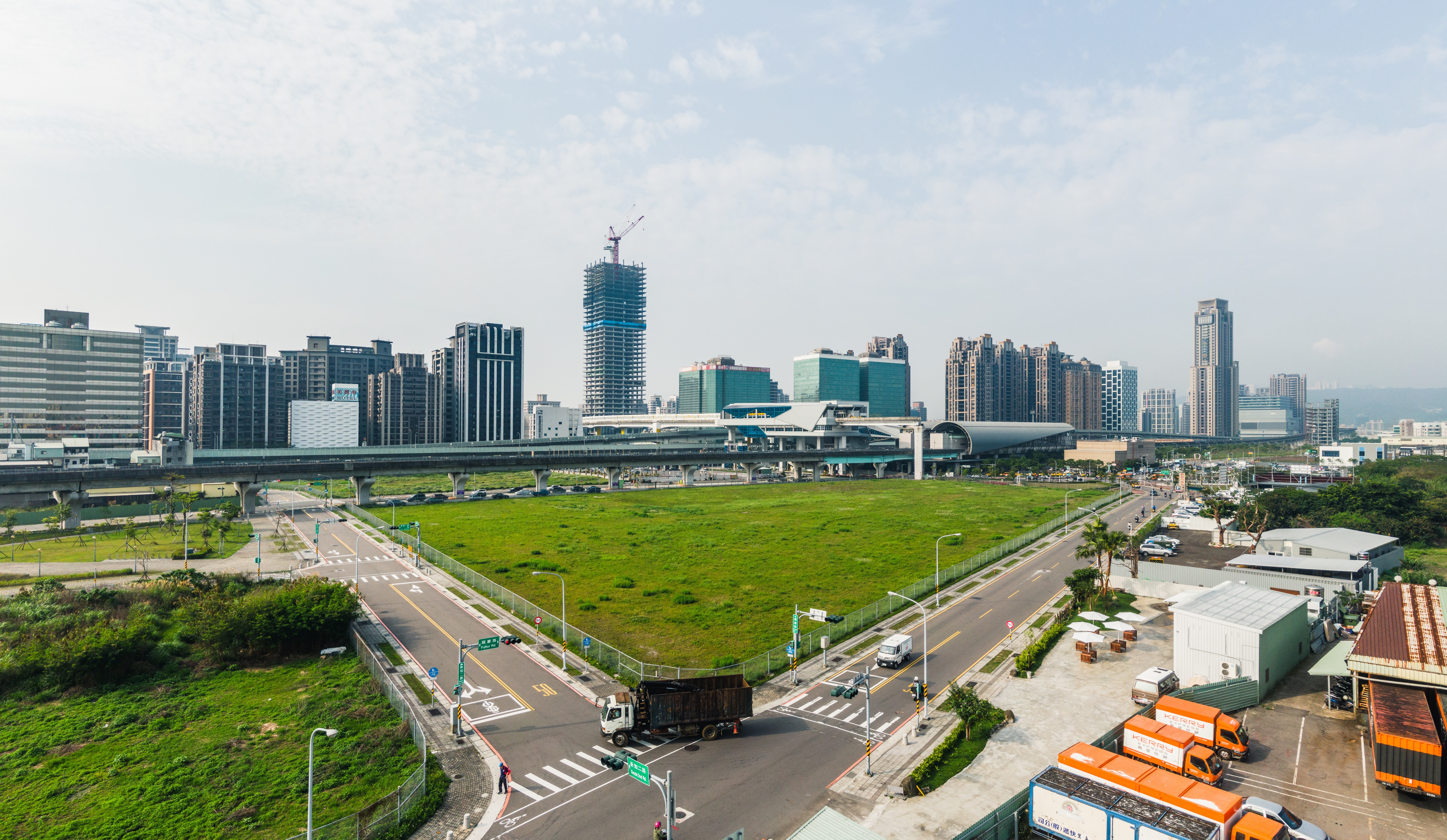
Xinzhuang

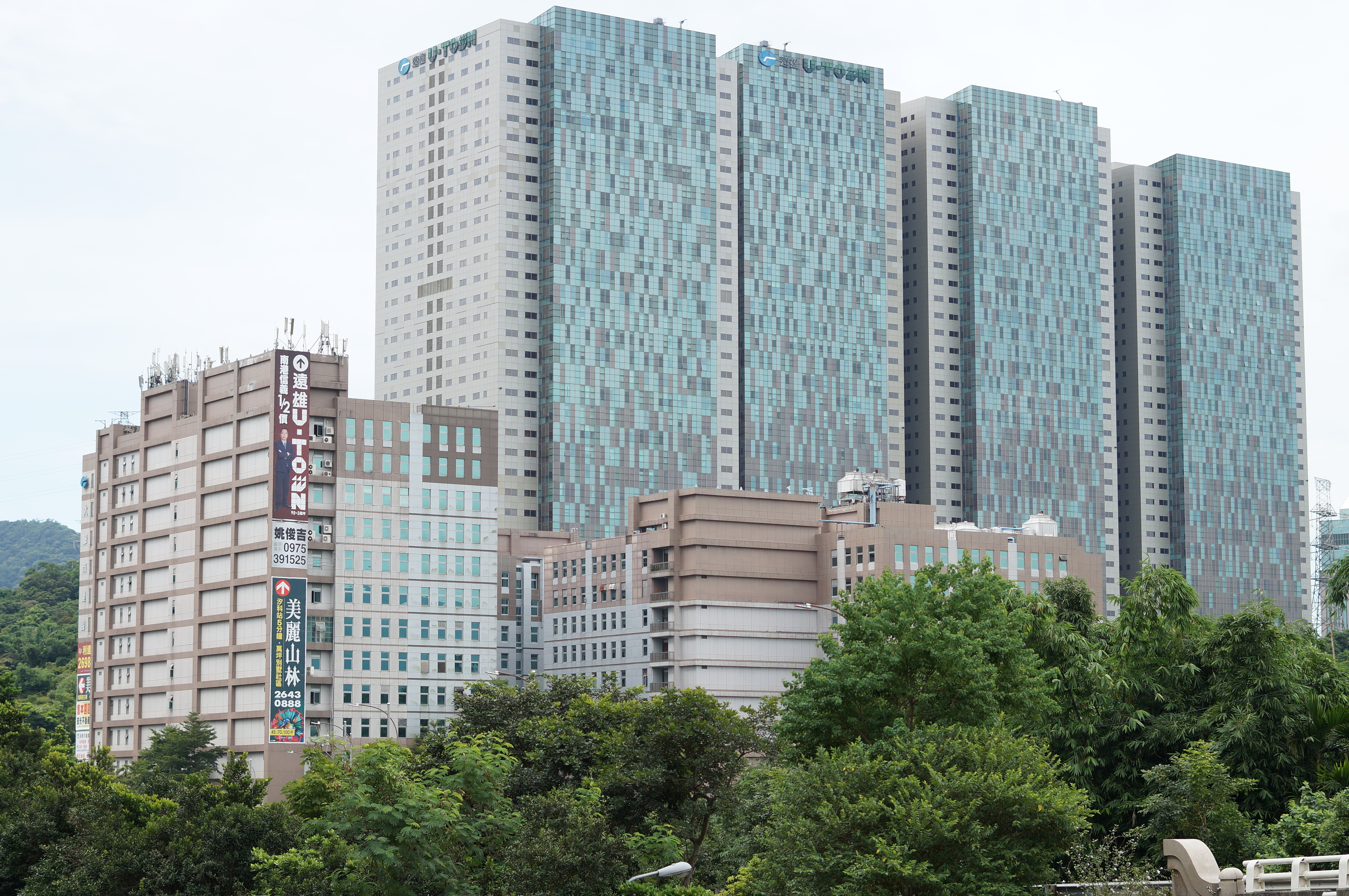
Xizhi

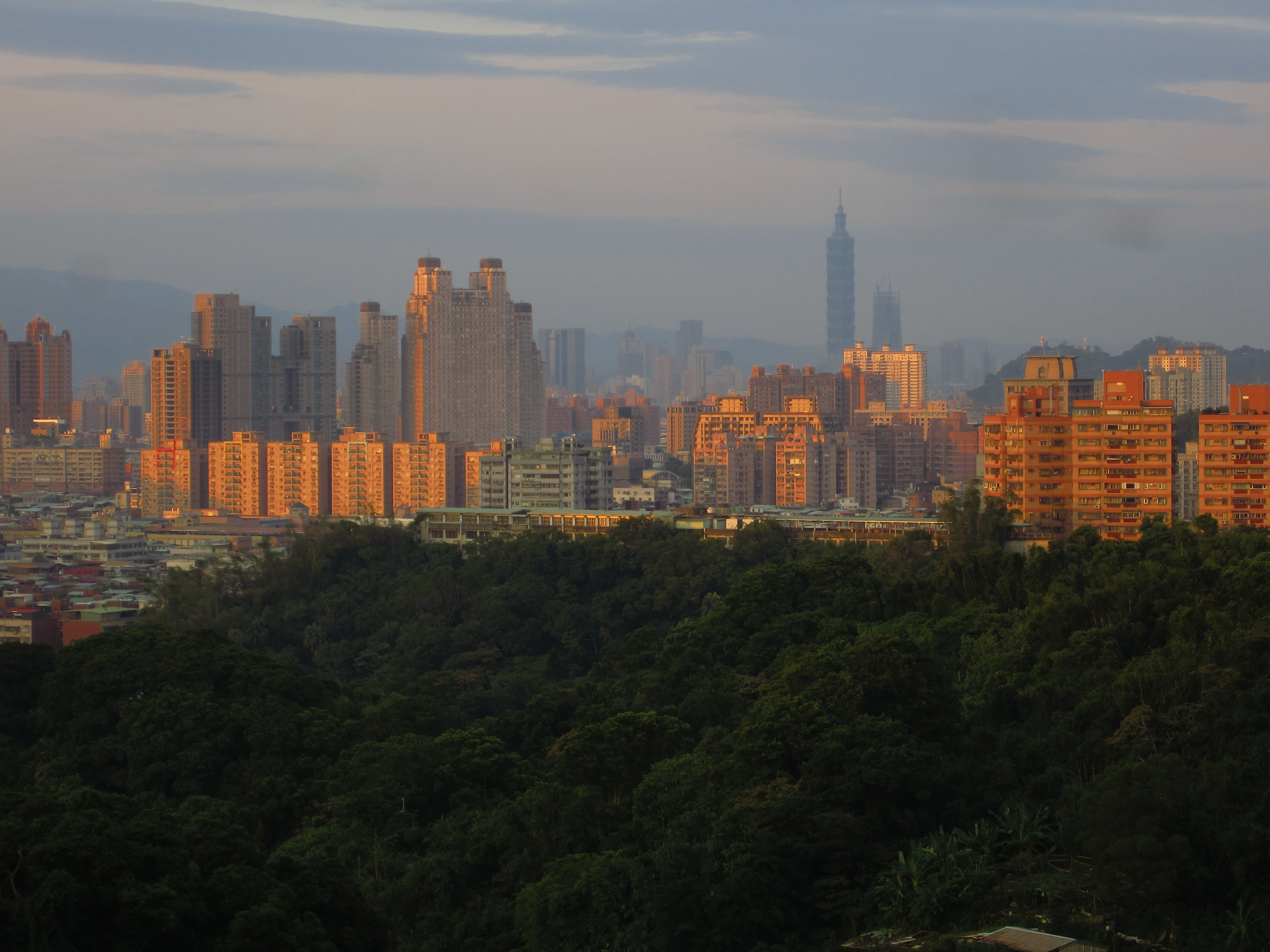
Zhonghe

== See also ==
- Skyscraper
- List of tallest buildings
- List of tallest buildings in Taiwan
- List of tallest buildings in Taichung
- List of tallest buildings in Taipei
- List of tallest buildings in Kaohsiung
