= Xinzhuang Sub-city Center =

Area of New Taipei City, Taiwan

Coordinates: 25°03′36″N 121°27′8″E

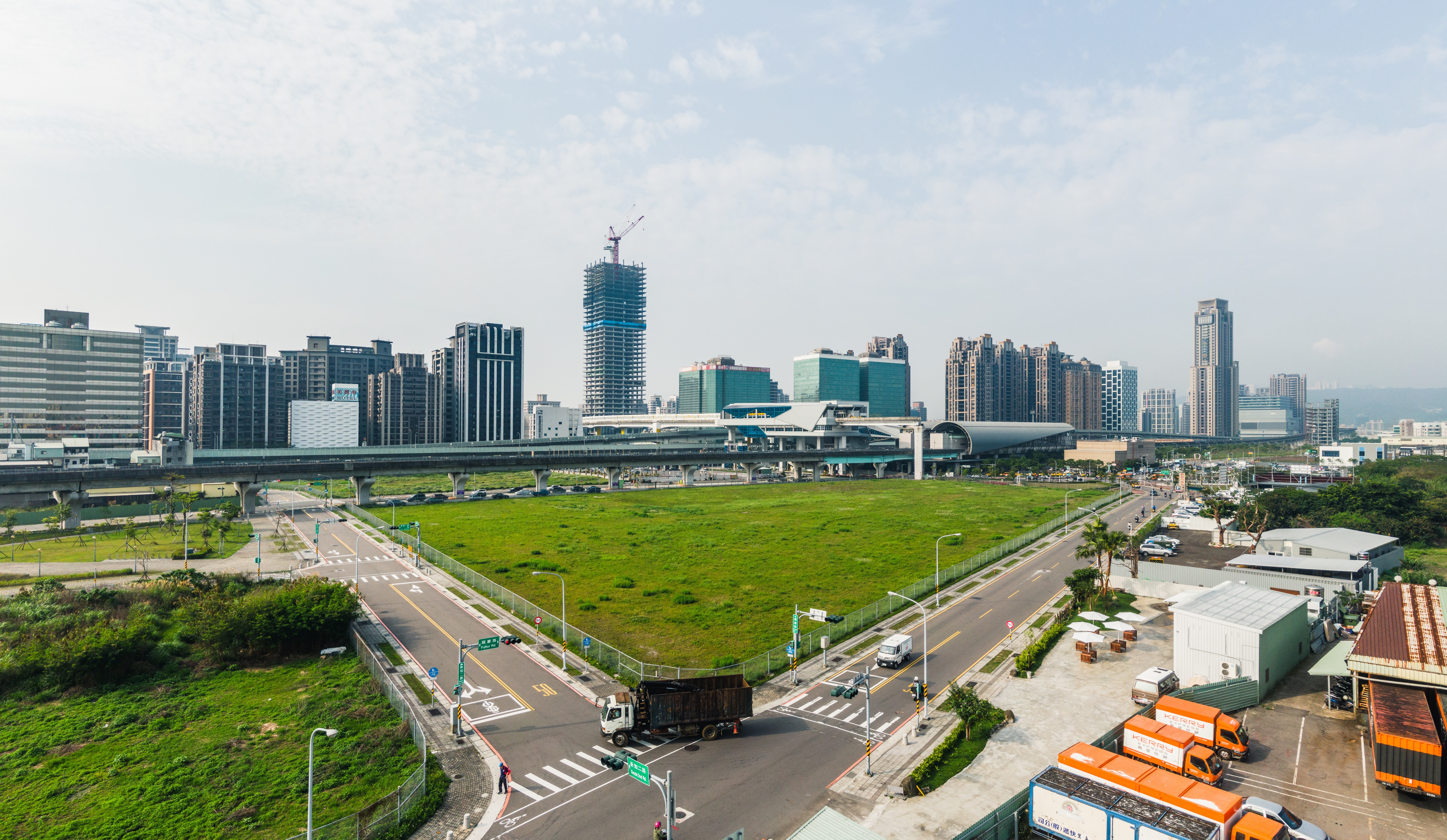
Skyline of Xinzhuang Sub-city Center

Xinzhuang Sub-city Center (Chinese: 新莊副都心) is a national-level rezoning area located on the west side of New Taipei City and the north side of Xinzhuang District. With a total area of about 100 hectares, Xinzhuang Sub-city Center was designated as the new prime central business district, administration center, and transport hub of New Taipei City. Designed in the 2010s and developed from the 2020s onwards, Xinzhuang Sub-city Center complements Xinban Special District, becoming twin cities spanning both sides of the Dahan River. Important infrastructure, such as Xinzhuang Joint Office Tower, New Taipei Industrial Park, Taiwan Film and Audiovisual Institute and International Community Radio Taipei, is located within this area.

== Recent Development ==
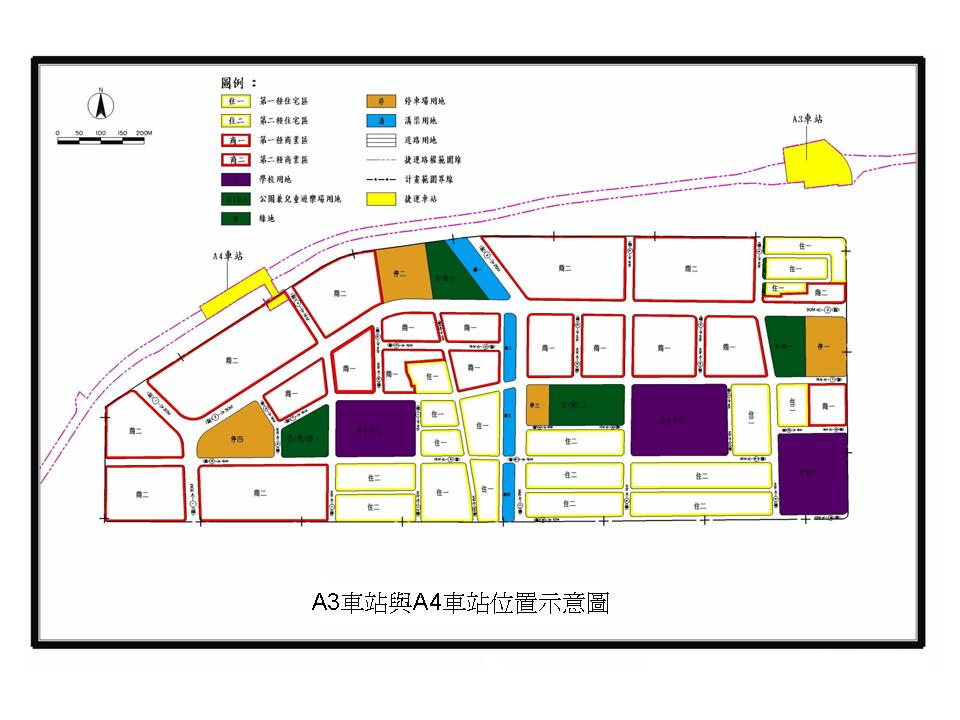
Map of Xinzhuang Sub-city Center

In recent years, Xinzhuang Sub-city Center has slowly developed into an urban core with many skyscraper office towers and commercial facilities. The tallest building in the area is the 42-storey Farglory 95rich, which has a height of 184.4 m (605 ft) and was completed in 2017. The second tallest is the 39-storey HongWell i-Tower, which has a height of 180.6 m (593 ft) and was completed in 2021. The first mall in the area, Honhui Plaza, opened on September 26, 2020 with a total floor area of 171,507.45 m^{2} (1,846,090.8 sq ft) and 14 floors above ground.

== Transportation ==
=== Mass Rapid Transit ===
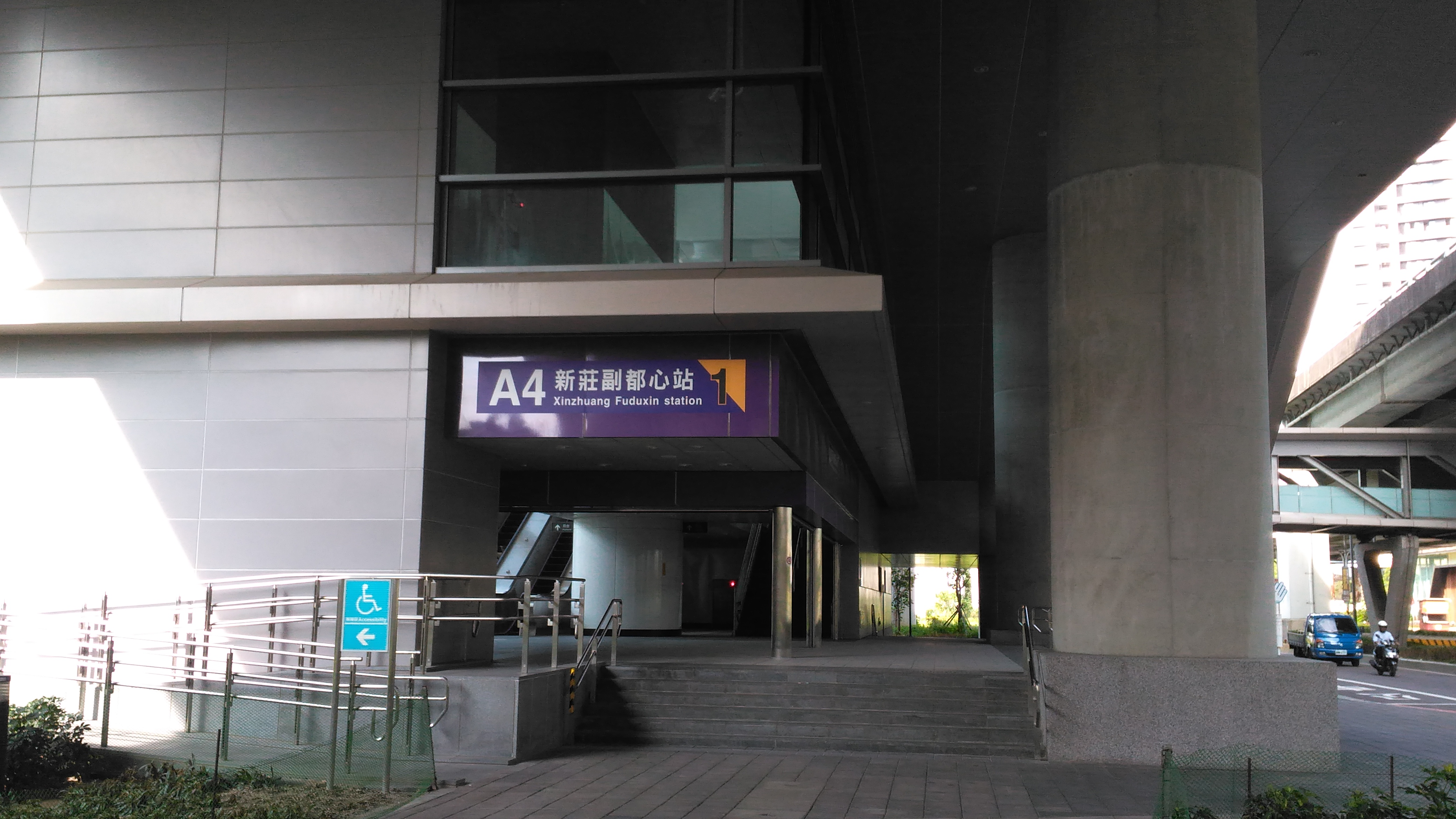
Xinzhuang Fuduxin metro station

==== New Taipei Metro ====
- Circular line: New Taipei Industrial Park metro station

==== Taoyuan Metro ====
- Taoyuan Airport MRT:
  - New Taipei Industrial Park metro station
  - Xinzhuang Fuduxin metro station

=== Road ===
- Provincial Highway 1
- Provincial Highway 65
- City Highway 106A

== Gallery ==
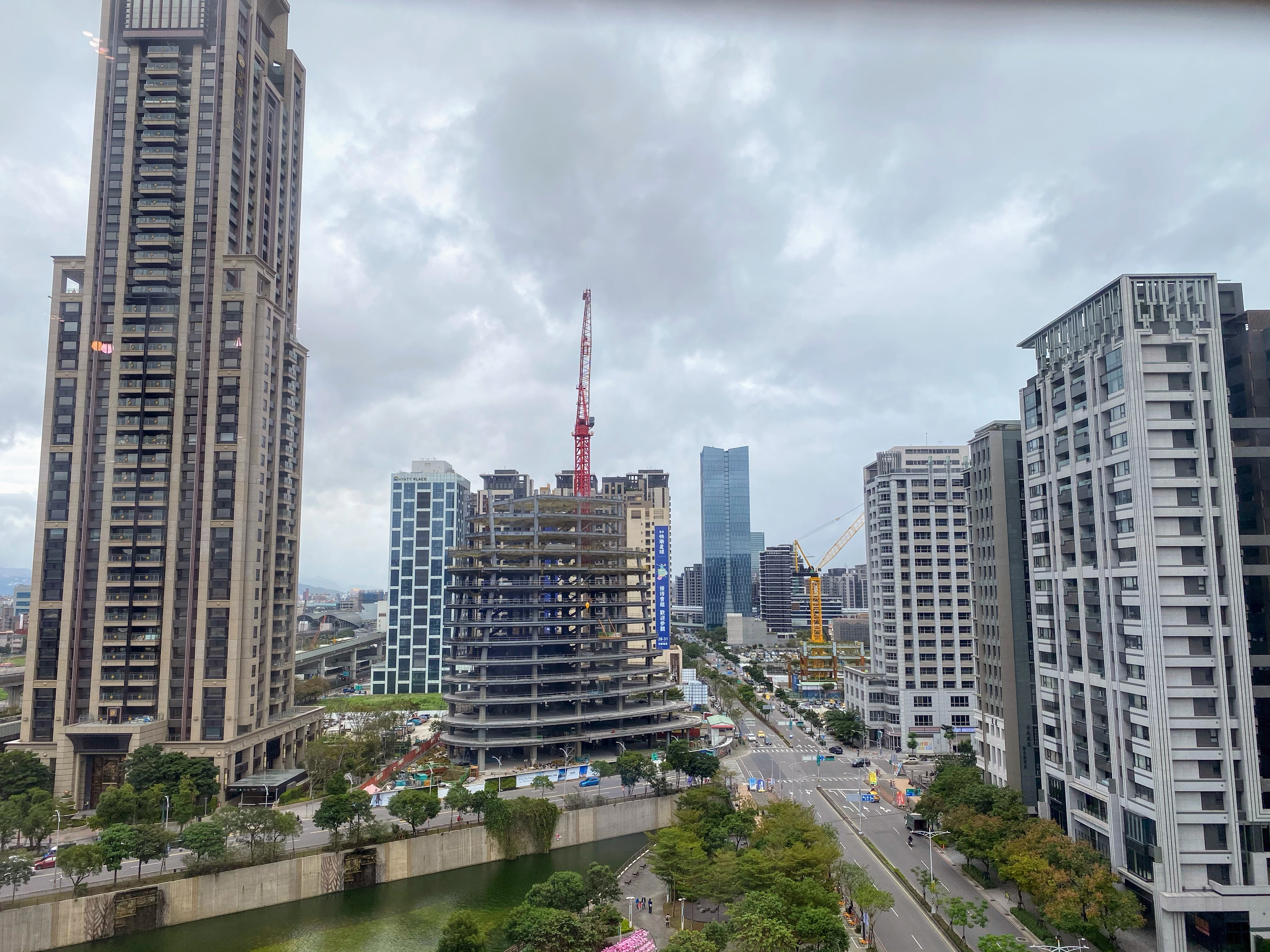
Skyscrapers of Xinzhuang Sub-city Center

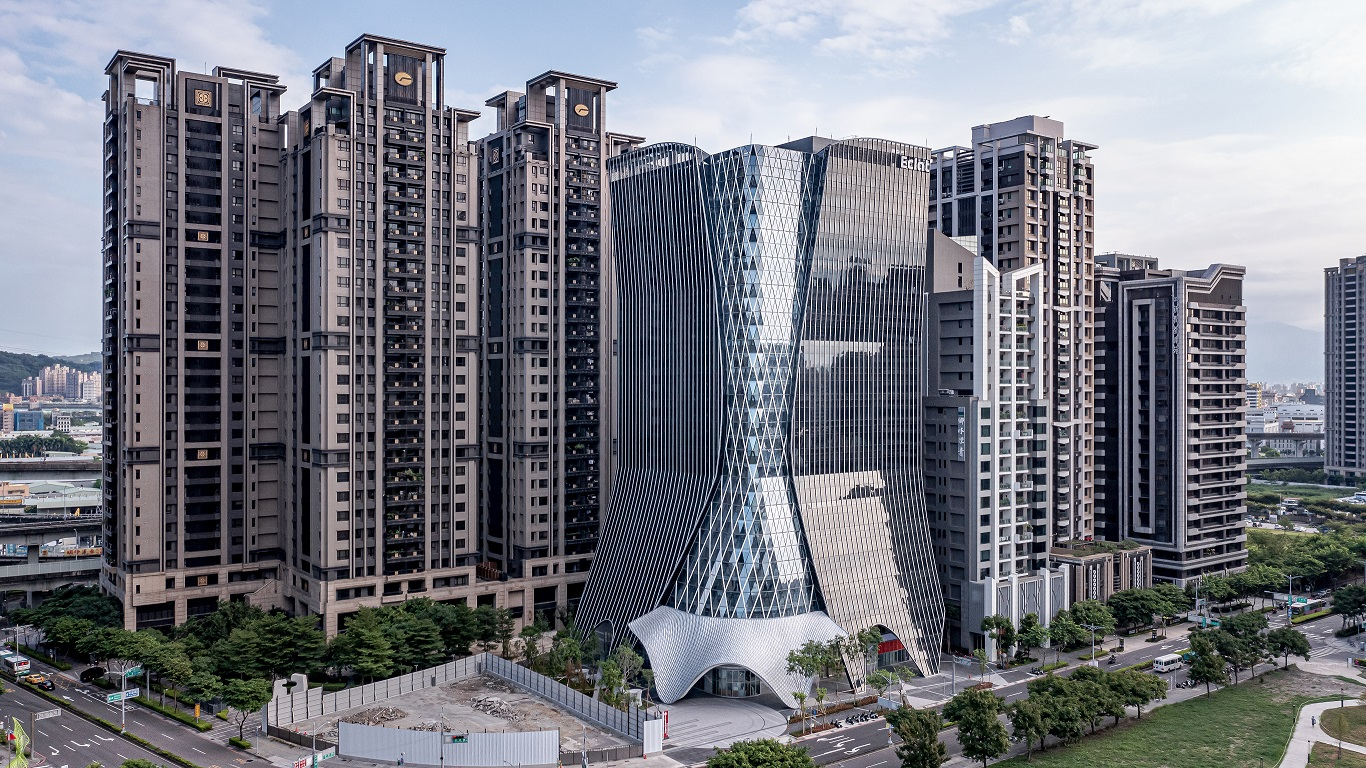

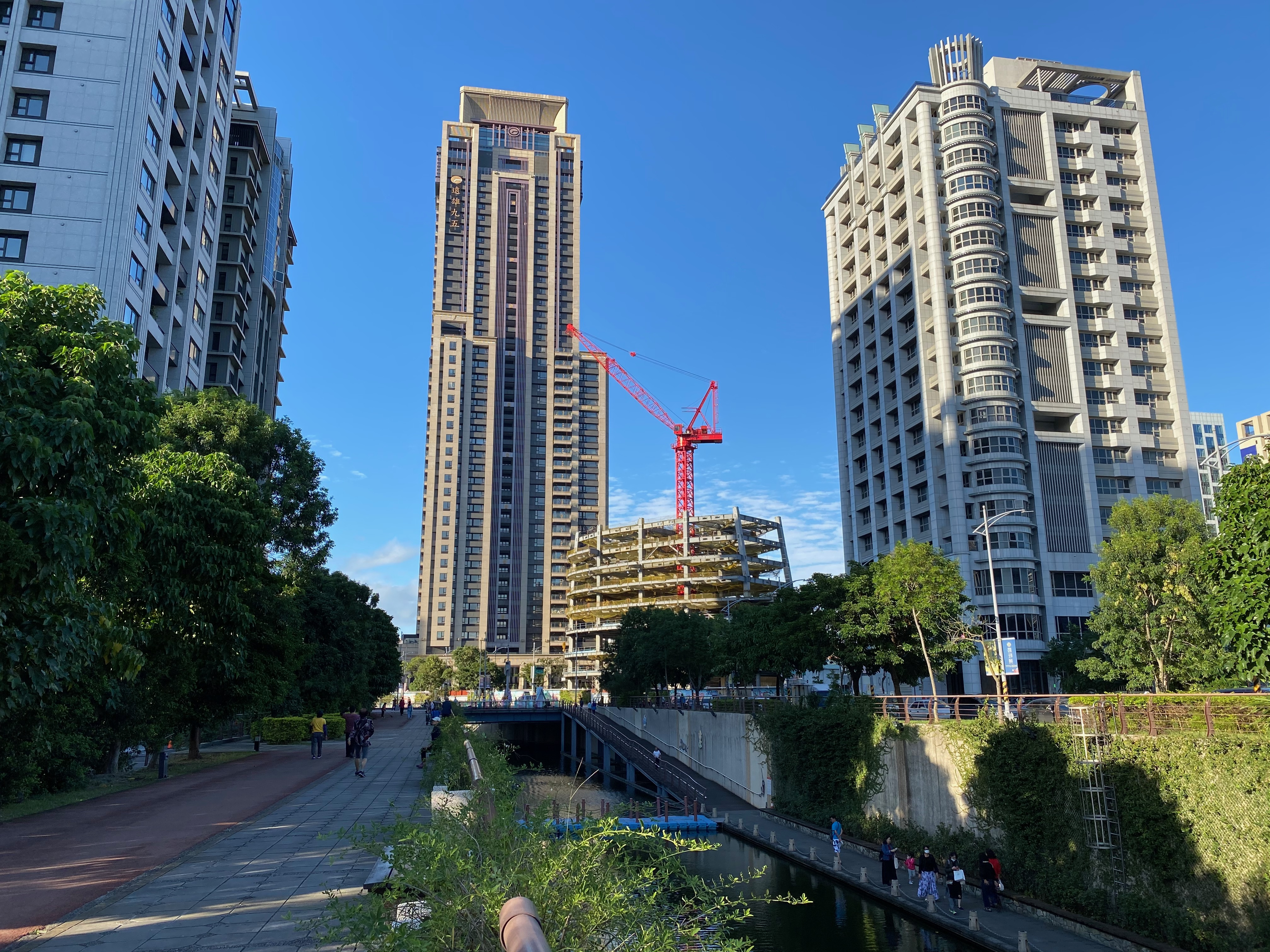

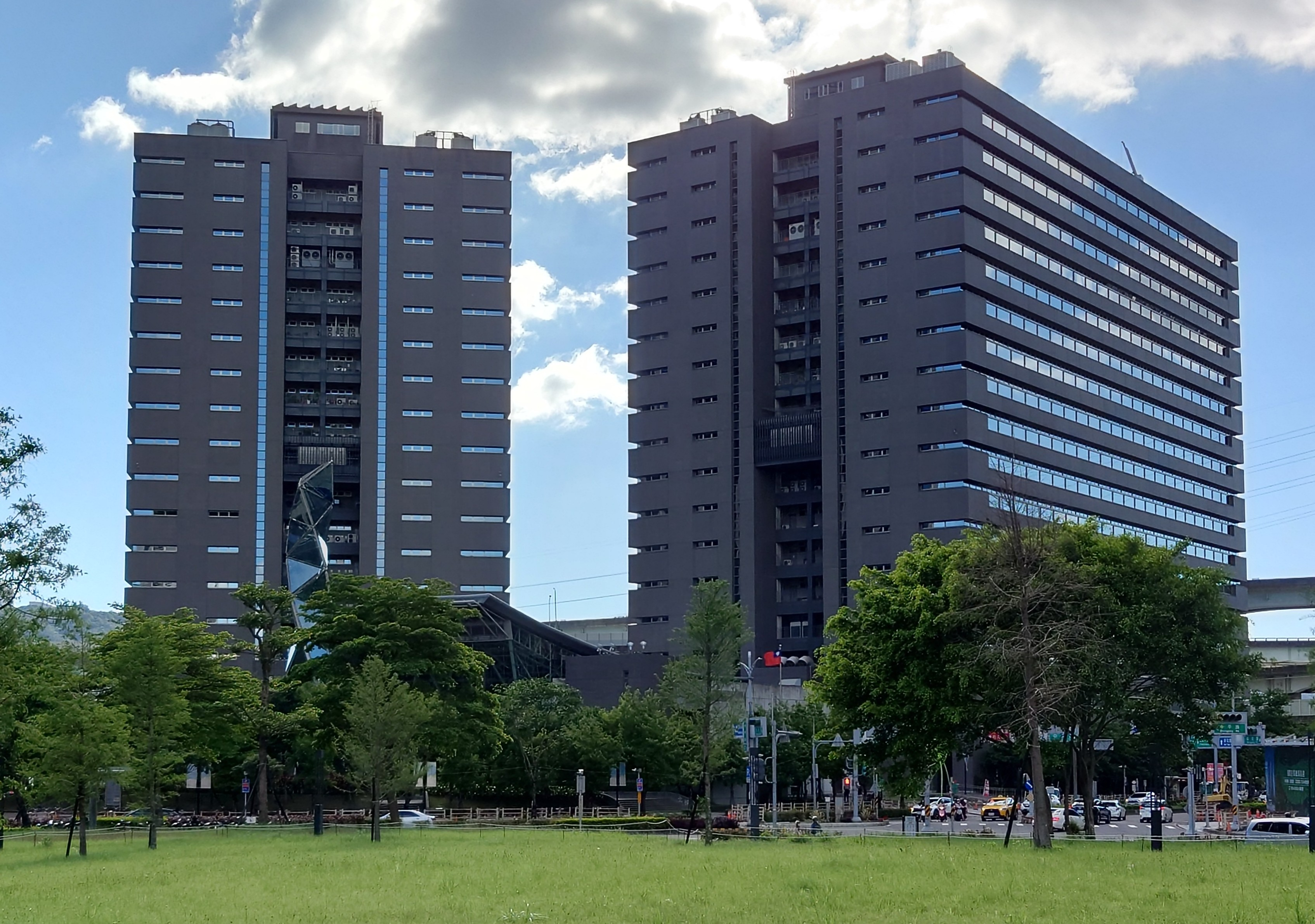
Xinzhuang Joint Office Tower

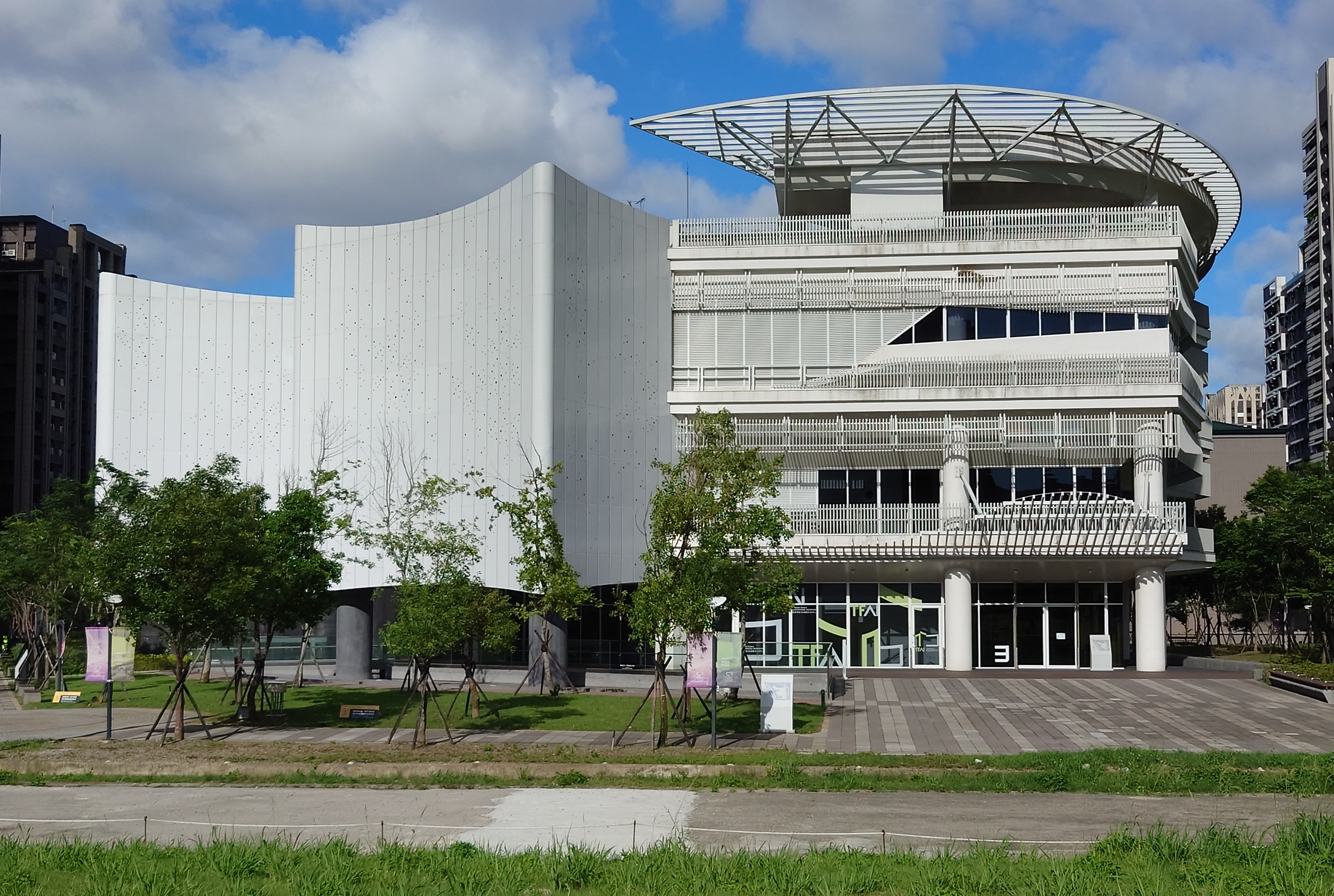
Taiwan Film and Audiovisual Institute

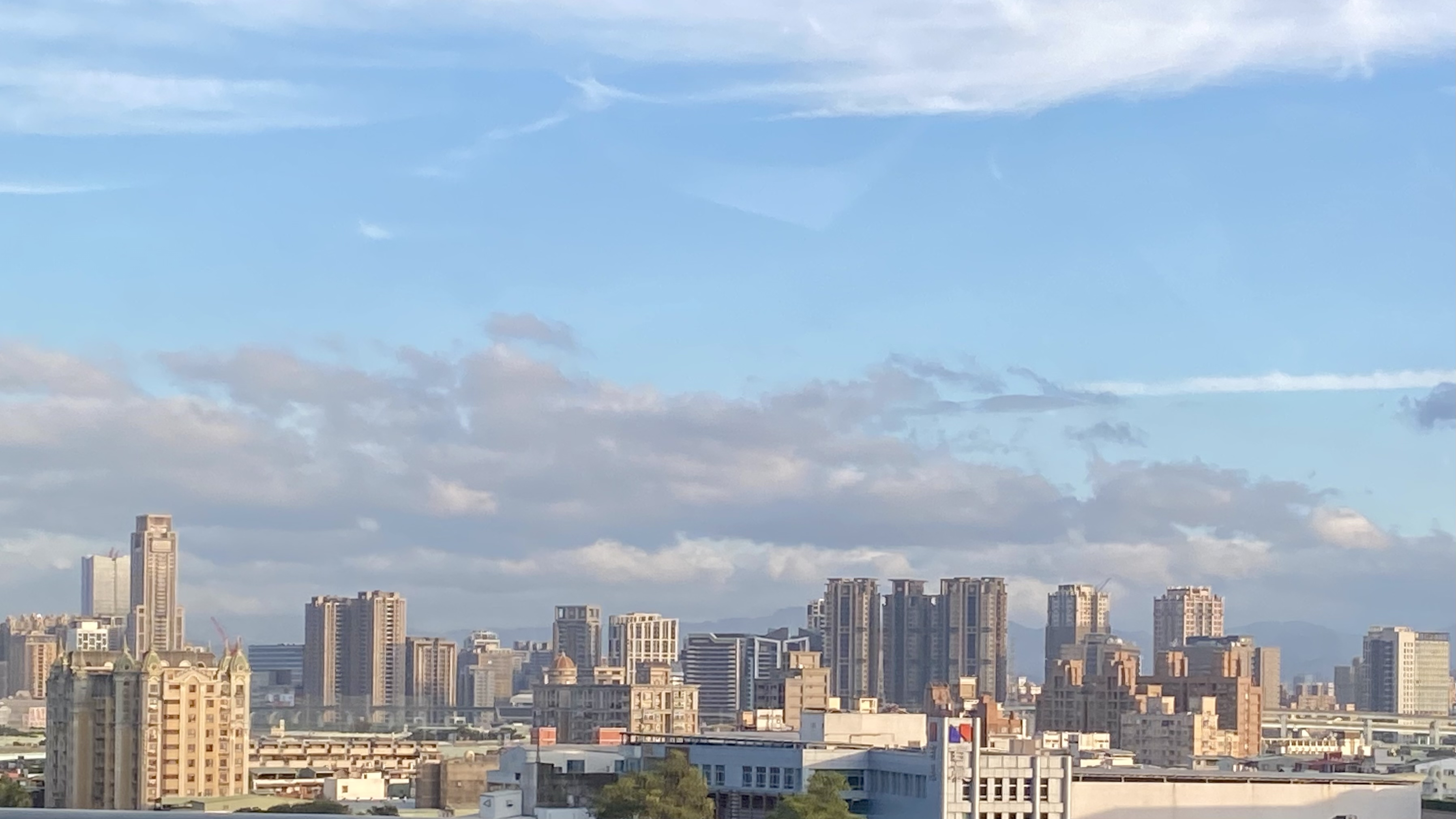
Skyline in 2020

== See also ==
- Xinyi Planning District
- Xinban Special District
- Taoyuan Zhongzheng Arts and Cultural Business District
- Urban planning in Taiwan
- Qingpu Special District
- Wenzaizhen
