= Christmasland in New Taipei City =

Christmas celebration in New Taipei

Christmasland in New Taipei City 新北歡樂耶誕城
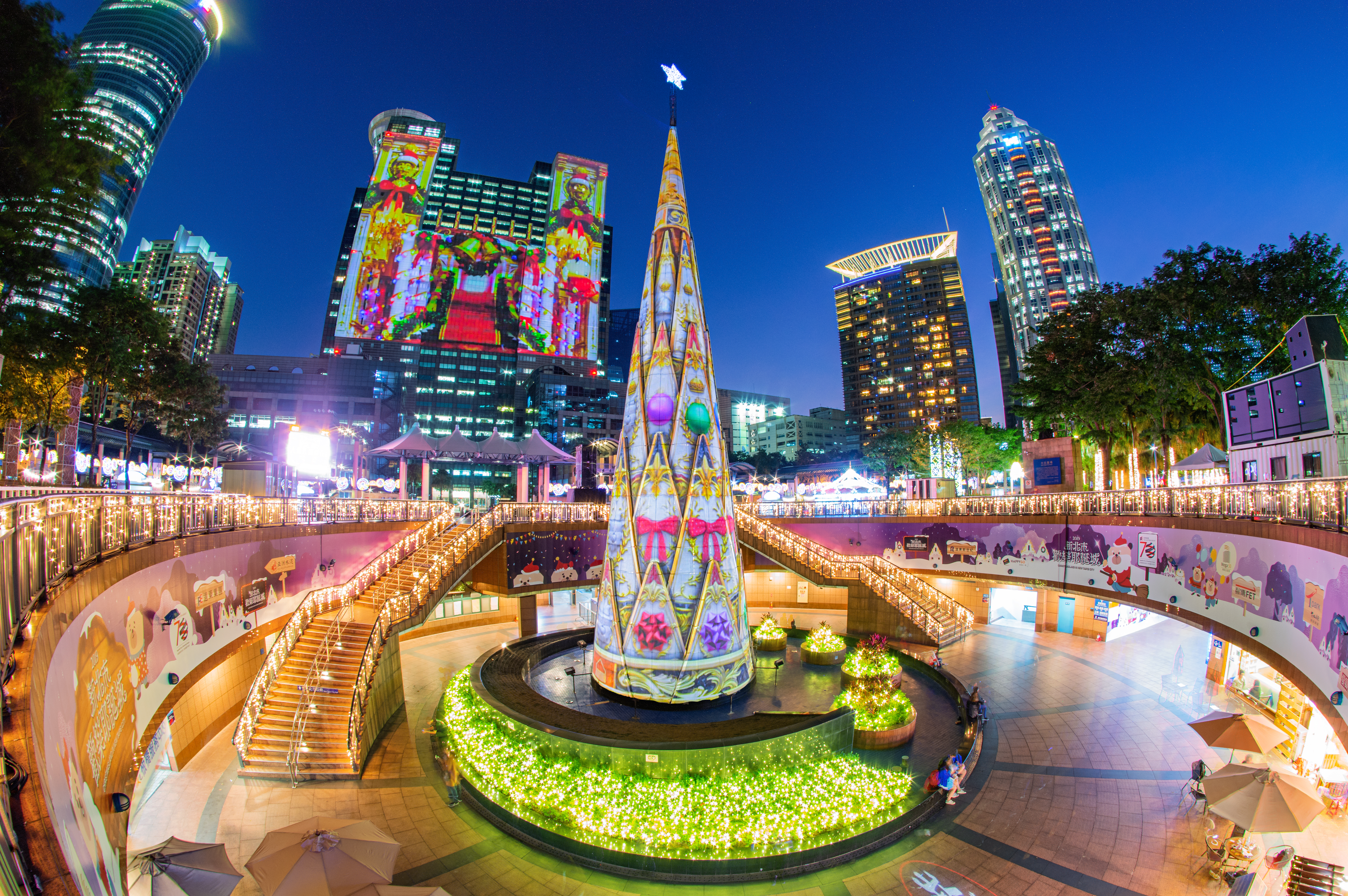
- Genre: Christmas event
- Date: mid November to mid January
- Frequency: Annual
- Location: Taipei City Hall Square
- Years active: 14
- Inaugurated: December 24, 2011; 14 years ago
- Budget: NT$ 65M (2024 event)
- Patron: New Taipei City Government
- Organizer: Department of Tourism, Taipei City Government
- People: About 8 million
- Website: https://christmasland.ntpc.gov.tw/

The Christmasland in New Taipei City (Chinese: 新北歡樂耶誕城; pinyin: xīnběi hūanlè yédàn chéng) is an annual Christmas celebration held in the Banqiao District of New Taipei City, Taiwan. It is one of the most prominent Christmas events in Taiwan, featuring a series of activities, concerts, and light displays that draw visitors from across the country and abroad. The event typically begins in mid-November and continues until early January, encompassing the Christmas season and New Year's celebrations. Christmasland has become an economic and cultural highlight of New Taipei City. Its large-scale decorations and performances create a festive atmosphere that enhances the holiday spirit and stimulates local businesses. The event also serves as a platform to showcase Taiwanese creativity and design, gaining recognition as a leading seasonal attraction in East Asia. In 2017, the event was featured in Harper's Bazaar "The world’s most amazing christmas trees".

== History ==
Christmasland was first organized in 2011 as part of an agreement between the Taipei City and New Taipei City Governments. To avoid competing for crowds and splitting resources, New Taipei City took responsibility for hosting the Christmas events, while Taipei City focused on organizing the annual New Year's Eve Party. The celebration has grown significantly since its inception, becoming a signature holiday event in Taiwan. The event is centered in the Xinban Special District, a highly accessible area with convenient transportation options, including a major transit hub for MRT, rail, and bus lines. The district's spacious plazas and thriving commercial zones contribute to the success of the event, which attracts large crowds every year.

== Features ==
Christmasland is known for its elaborate light displays, themed installations, and live performances. Each year, the main Christmas tree is a highlight, often designed with innovative and artistic elements.

- 2019: The district's iconic "Bamboo Shoot" structure was transformed into a towering Christmas tree with a light and sound show. Surrounding areas featured festive decorations and interactive installations.
- 2023: The event introduced a new "sky canopy" design for the Christmas tree, which was reimagined as a matcha-themed cake surrounded by colorful dessert-like installations. The tree was illuminated with strings of lights radiating outward, creating a dazzling starry effect over the plaza. The mascot "Santa Bear" was chosen as the event's centerpiece, adding a playful and family-friendly touch.

In addition to the light displays, Christmasland incorporates city-wide activities, concerts, and themed markets. These features encourage domestic and international tourists to plan visits in advance, making it a significant driver of local tourism.

== Transportation ==
Christmasland's location in the Xinban Special District makes it easily accessible by metro. The Banqiao Station serves as a major transit hub for the Taipei Metro, Taiwan Railway, and Taiwan High Speed Rail. The district is also well-connected by highways and arterial roads, facilitating convenient travel from surrounding areas.

== See also ==
- Xinban Special District
- Taipei New Year's Eve Party
