= Wenzizun =

Taiwanese residential development

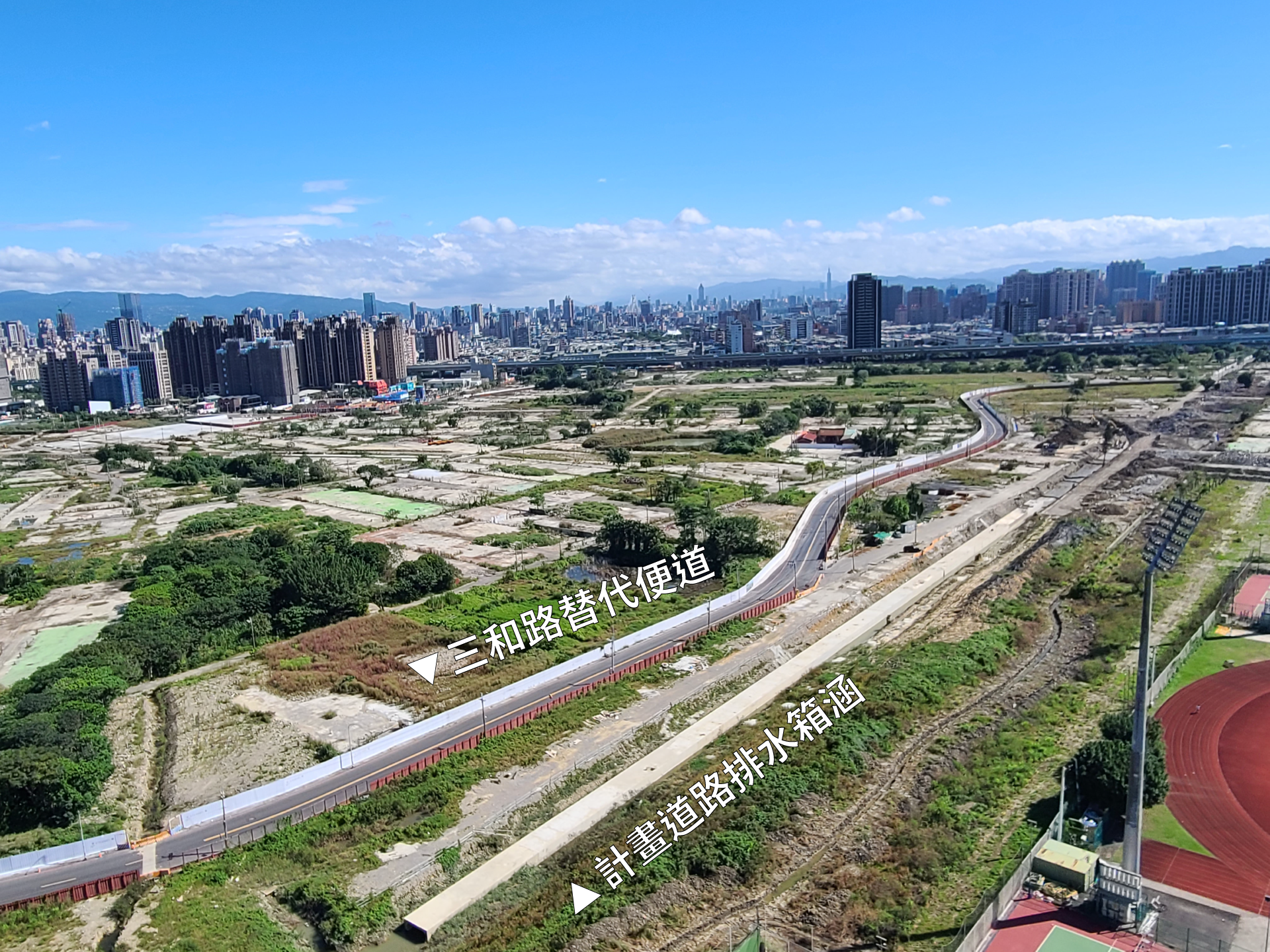
Wenzizun Urban Land Consolidation Project

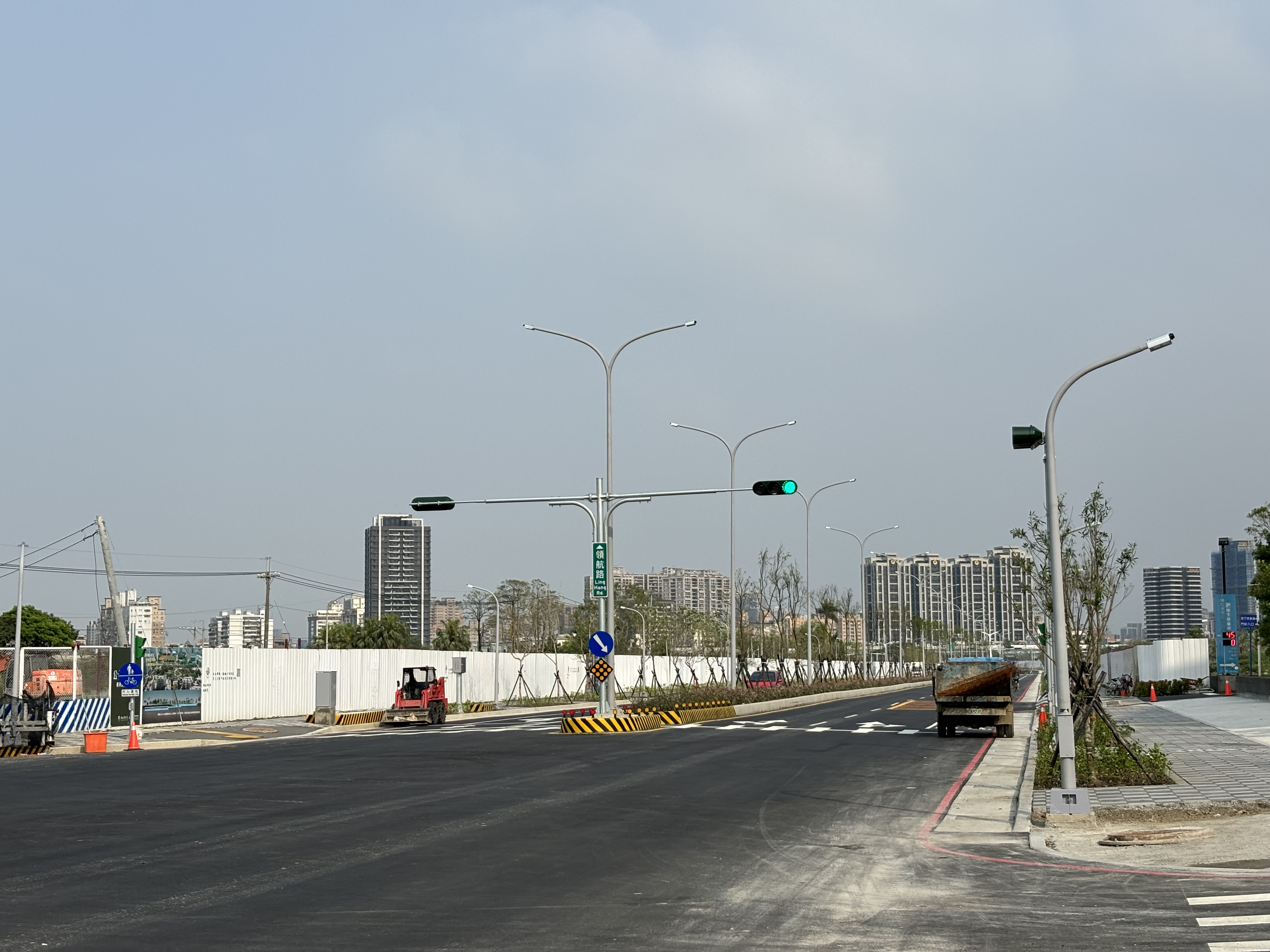
Linghang Road, the first newly constructed road of Wenzizun

Wenzizun (Chinese: 塭仔圳重劃區; pinyin: Wēnzǐzùn Chónghuà Qū), formally known as the New Taipei City Xin-Tai Wenzizun Redevelopment Zone (Chinese: 新北市新、泰塭仔圳市地重劃; pinyin: Xīnběi Shì Xīn-Tài Wēnzǐzùn Shìdì Chónghuà), is an urban renewal zone located in Xinzhuang District and Taishan District, on the west side of New Taipei City, Taiwan. It is in close proximity to Provincial Highway 65 and Fu Jen Catholic University. The area is approximately 400 hectares, equivalent to the total area of four Xinzhuang Sub-city Centers, one of the largest urban development plan in Northern Taiwan.

== Background ==
The Wenzizun redevelopment zone is located at the junction of Xinzhuang and Taishan Districts in New Taipei City. It was originally a flood plain first-level control zone controlled to cooperate with the Tamsui River flood control. The relevant local development plans have been delayed for many years. After the land was deregulated, the land provided after the completion of the regional flood control plan was converted into urban development land. After the land was rezoned, it was submitted to the Ministry of the Interior for approval to implement the redevelopment zone and handle its overall development.

== Planning ==
=== Development rezoning ===
Total area: approximately 400 hectares

=== Area planning ===
- Public roads: 121.35 hectares
- Building land: 240.45 hectares
- Sidewalk: 0.28 hectares
- Parking lot: 1.92 hectares
- Playground: 5.81 hectares
- Square: 1.52 hectares
- Park: 24.97 hectares
- School: 31.7 hectares
- Public transportation: Taoyuan Airport MRT Station A5a

== Future Prospects ==
Infrastructure development is a major focus of the Wenzizun project, with a strong emphasis on enhancing transportation connectivity. The expansion of the Taoyuan Airport MRT, particularly the development of MRT Station A5a, will improve public transportation access, linking the area directly to Taipei Main Station and Taoyuan International Airport. Additionally, the integration of Provincial Highway 65 with newly constructed roads will facilitate smoother traffic flow and greater accessibility to other districts in New Taipei City and Taipei City. The redevelopment zone is also planned to be pedestrian and bicycle-friendly, incorporating walkable streets, dedicated bike lanes, and public green spaces to create a modern and sustainable urban environment.

A significant aspect of the Wenzizun Redevelopment Zone is its potential to become a leading center for technology and innovation. The project aims to integrate smart city technologies, including 5G infrastructure, smart traffic management, and energy-efficient buildings. With the presence of Fu Jen Catholic University, Ming Chi University of Technology, and other educational institutions in the vicinity, the area is expected to foster collaborations between academia and industries, particularly in research and development, into a college town by 2026. The establishment of partnerships with technology firms, biotech companies, and research institutes will further position Wenzizun as a hub for scientific and technological advancements. Moreover, the project places a strong emphasis on environmental sustainability, with plans to incorporate green energy solutions such as solar power, rainwater harvesting, and energy-efficient construction methods. These initiatives align with Taiwan’s broader goals for carbon reduction and eco-friendly urban development.

=== Challenges ===
Despite its promising future, the redevelopment of Wenzizun faces several challenges that must be carefully managed. The timely completion of infrastructure, including roads, flood control measures, and public utilities, is crucial to the project’s overall success. Additionally, the demand for commercial and residential properties in the area will depend on broader economic conditions, business investment trends, and housing market fluctuations. Real estate speculation could also pose a challenge, potentially affecting housing affordability and long-term urban planning objectives. Furthermore, the environmental impact of large-scale urban development, particularly concerning flood management and ecosystem preservation, requires careful planning and continuous monitoring to ensure a balance between development and sustainability.

== See also ==
- Xinzhuang Sub-city Center
- Danhai New Town
