= Urban planning in Taiwan =

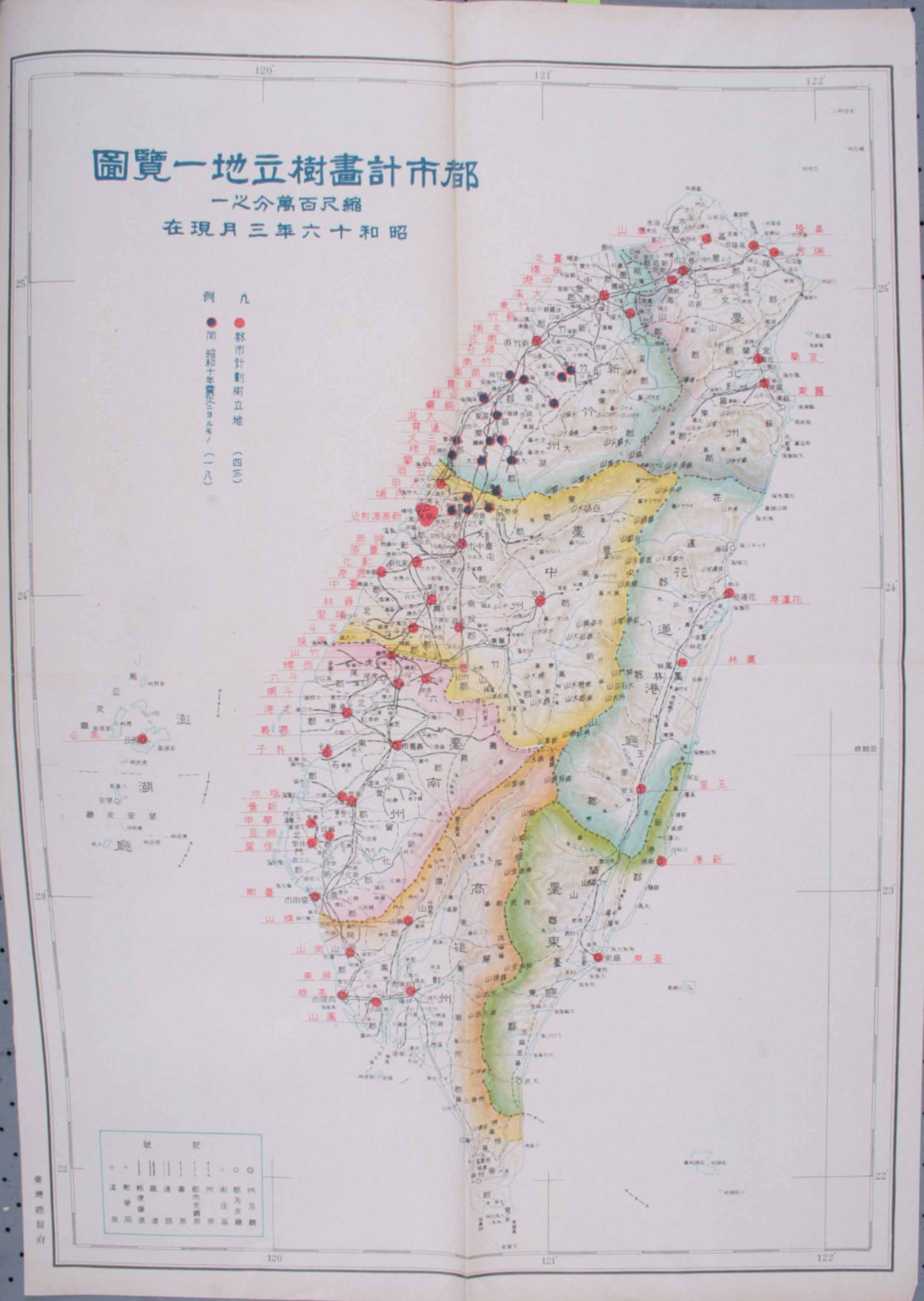
Taiwan Urban Planning Map (1941)

Urban planning in Taiwan has a significant role to play in ensuring the future sustainability of Taiwanese cities. Taiwan is one of the most highly urbanized countries in the world, with roughly 85% of its population living in cities. High population density in Taiwanese cities places high pressure on infrastructure, such as public transport and roadways, energy, air and water systems within the urban environment.

Urban planning in Taiwan is governed by the Urban Planning Act, which defines three types of plans: city/town plans, countryside street plans, and special district plans, to distinguish between new urban developments and renewal of older areas. Local governments periodically update their plans to better align with national policies on sustainable land use, green space, disaster mitigation, and urban–rural integration.

== History ==
Urban planning in Taiwan has evolved since Japanese colonial settlement, and has been heavily influenced by contemporary planning movements in Japan. However, over the 50 years, distinctly Taiwanese responses and solutions to Taiwanese urban issues have developed.

=== Japanese colonial period (1895–1945) ===
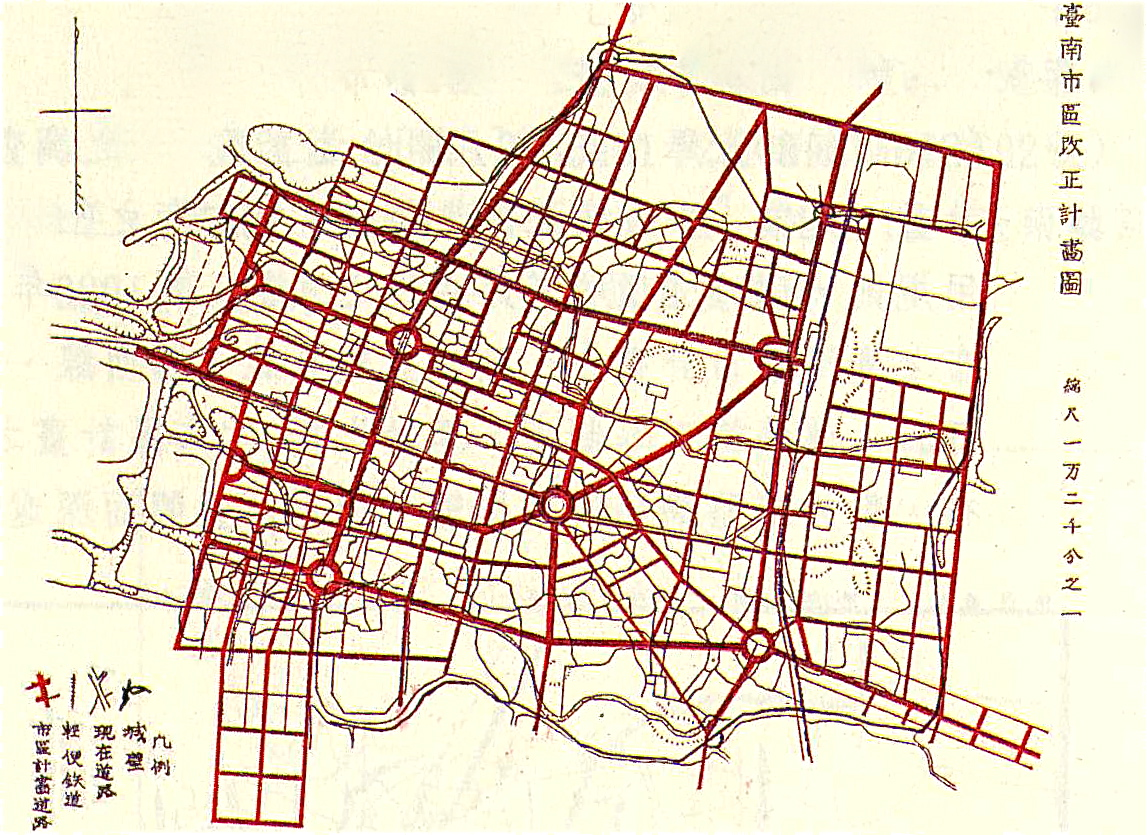
Tainan urban planning map (1911)

The first examples of town planning in Taiwan occurred during the early phases of the Colonial era, where urban planning was used as a tool to facilitate control and modernization of the colony. Typically this involved colonial Governors undertaking surveying for land grants and subdivisions, and making executive decisions on the location and construction of roads, rail transport, water supply and other basic infrastructure to support early penal and military settlements.

In July of 1896, a Scottish engineer, W. K. Burton , was brought in to look at the city of Taipei. He proposed the "Taihoku sanitary works plan", which included a separate water supply, sewage system, the demolition of illegal houses built into the street, as well as wider alleys. In 1900, an urban planning official named Yoshio Murakami drew up the plan that set the basic shape of modern Taipei. In this plan, the city walls from the Qing dynasty were demolished and three-lane boulevards were established on the old foundations. In 1908, the first public water works opened at the pumping station that is now the Museum of Drinking Water, which supplied about 20,000 tons of water a day to 120,000 residents.

A total of 72 cities and towns were part of the urban planning, with a total area of about 52,500 ha (130,000 acres) and a total planned population of about 3.26 million. During this period, cities like Taipei were redesigned into colonial administrative centers, featuring monumental civic buildings and axial avenues, wide boulevards, grid layouts, and civic spaces inspired by Tokyo's urban form. The previous narrow and winding roads and poor sanitary environment were replaced by wide and straight roads, roundabouts, parks and other public facilities, as well as the standardization of building settings.

=== Post World War II period (1945-1970s) ===
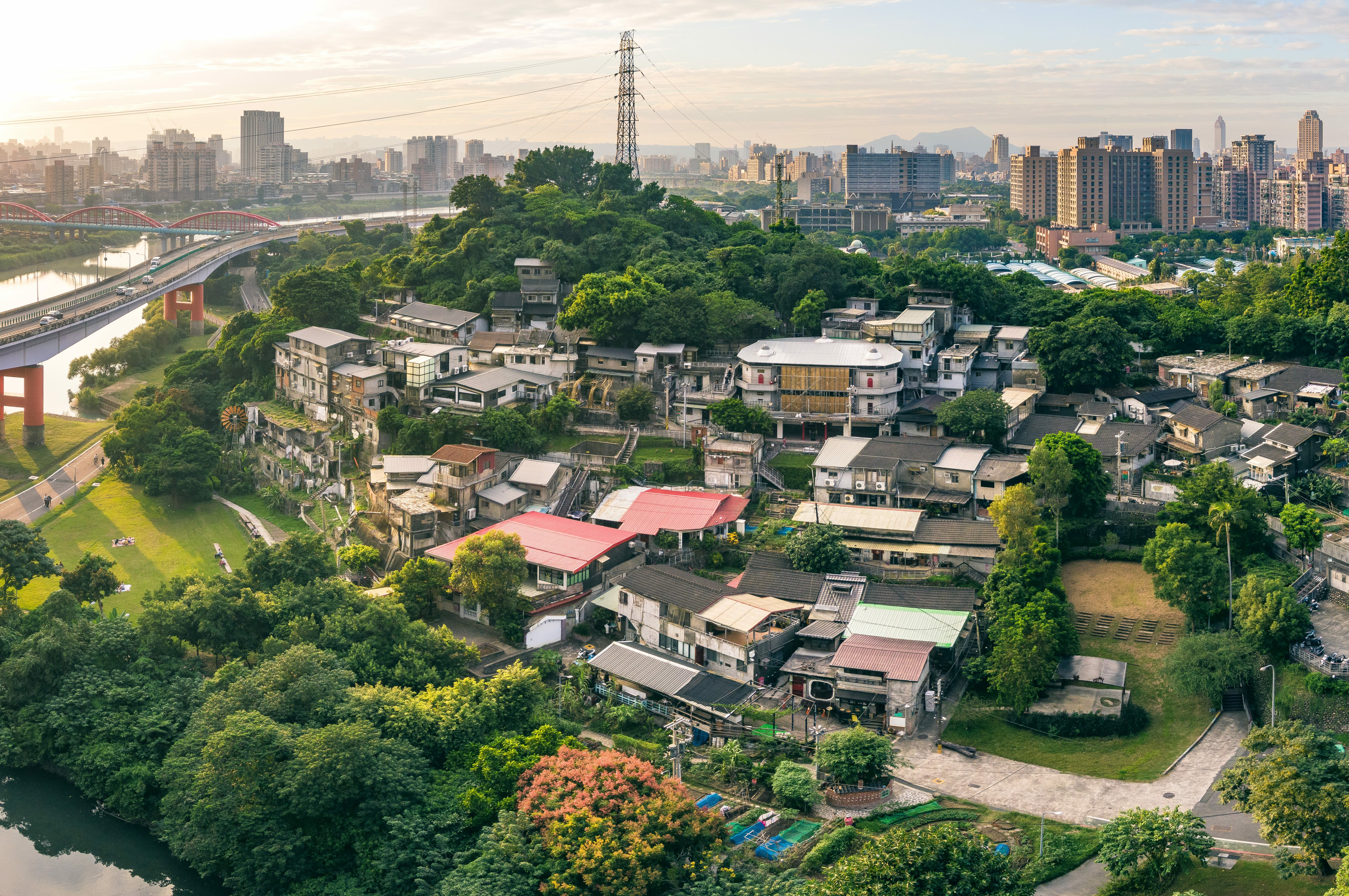
A military dependents' village in Taipei.

After the Retreat of the government of the Republic of China to Taiwan in 1945, Taiwanese cities entered a period of rapid but largely unregulated urban development. By 1949, the influx of over two million Chinese civil war refugees and early industrialization triggered a massive rural-to-urban migration, particularly to the capital. Between 1945 and 1950, Taipei's population grew by over 168,000 (approximately 50%), leading to the emergence of numerous informal settlements, military dependents' villages, and shanty towns in the surrounding areas. By the late 1950s, Taipei's shanty towns were estimated at 15,000 units; with the worsening land and housing shortages, this number exceeded 50,000 units by the early 1960s.

=== Metropolitan planning ===
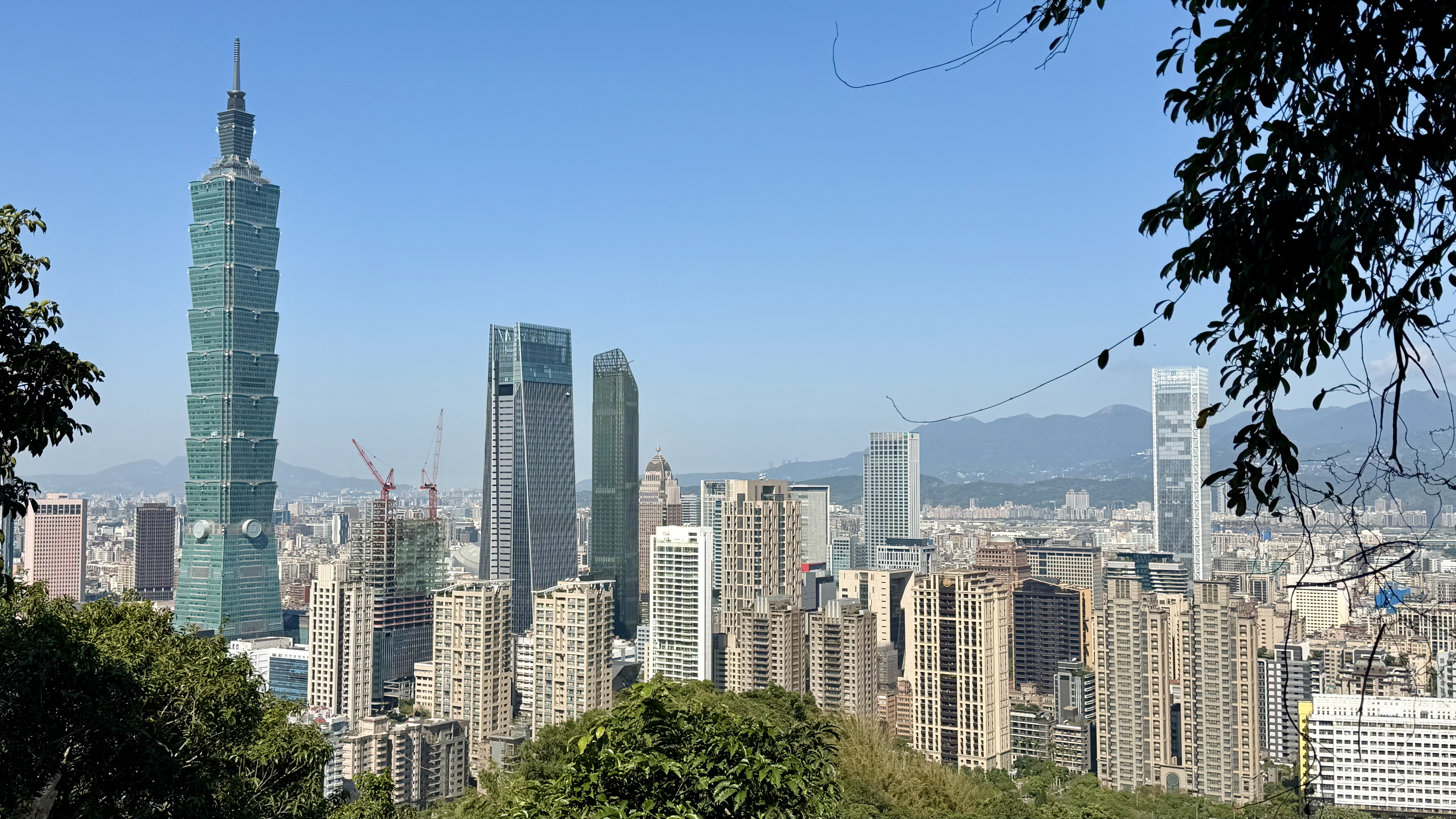
Taipei's Xinyi Planning District in 2026.

Taiwan's long period of post war economic growth prompted the Taiwanese government to start developing metropolitan plans in an attempt to address some of the negative aspects associated with urban growth.

Urban planning in Taiwan transformed dramatically under by the Ten Major Construction Projects launched in 1974. These projects aimed to modernize Taiwan's transportation, energy, industrial base and basic infrastructure, with a total construction cost exceeding NT$300 billion. In 1988, the Urban Planning Act was further amended to allow private developers to purchase unused building areas allocated to public land to allow the construction of high-density mixed-use developments near transportation hubs.

From the 1990s to the early 2000s, Taiwan's urban planning helped to reshape the landscape of Taiwan's major cities. Large-scale mixed-use zones, such as national-level planning zones, redevelopment zones, and new towns, emerged in major cities during this period. The earliest example is Taipei's Xinyi Planning District. Developed in the 1970s and further developed in the 1980s and 90s, this area gradually became Taipei's financial and central business district. Other examples include New Taipei City's Xinban Special District, Danhai New Town, Linkou New Town, Taoyuan Zhongzheng Arts and Cultural Business District, Taichung's Port New Town, and Kaohsiung's Ciaotou New Town. The development of these strategically planned areas enhanced Taipei's urban landscape by making it easier for people to commute around the city after more lines of the MRT were built that extended to these new towns.

In the 2010s and beyond, Taiwan's urban planning has pivoted toward sustainability, smart city technology, and renewal of ageing districts by focusing on pedestrian-centered redesigns, public space enhancements, and culturally sensitive redevelopment that combines historical preservation with modern needs.

== Criticisms ==
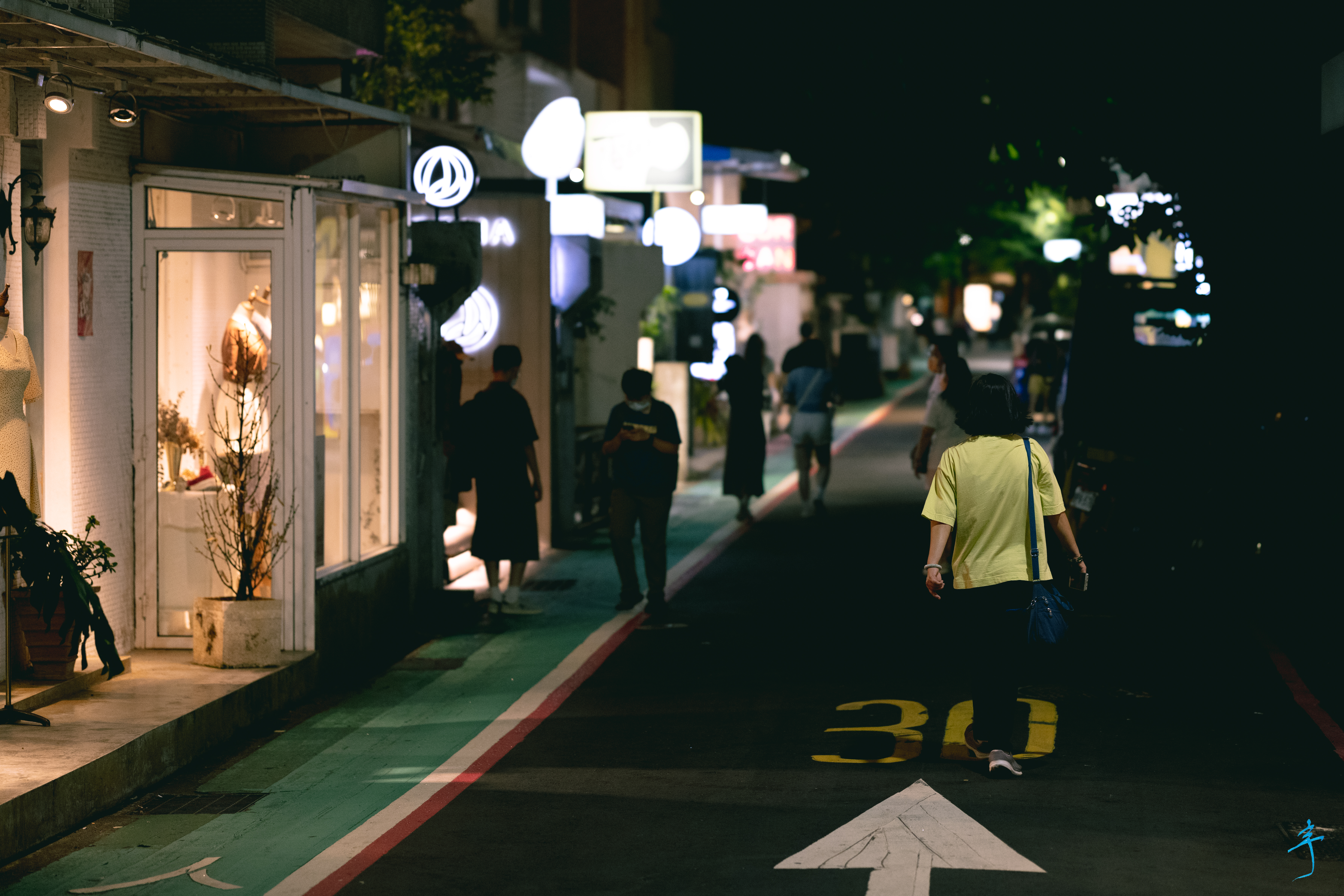
Green painted sidewalks.

Taiwan's urban planning methods are often criticized for overemphasizing cars while neglecting crucial pedestrian infrastructure. In December 2022, a CNN article harshly criticized Taiwan's traffic conditions, calling it "pedestrian hell". The article pointed out the poor design of crosswalks, the lack of sidewalks, and weak enforcement of pedestrian priority, especially outside major cities. Outside major cities, nearly half of roads wider than 12 meters lack sidewalks altogether.

This is reflected in the death statistics. By early 2025, 410 pedestrian deaths were recorded, highlighting the high risk associated with wide roads without sidewalks.

In April 2024, a Taipei Times editorial criticized the government's ambitious but poorly implemented pedestrian safety project, pointing out that inconsistent sidewalk materials, uneven surfaces, and various obstacles actually hinder pedestrian access to sidewalks.

== See also ==
- Geography of Taiwan
