= Xinban Special District =

Area of New Taipei, Taiwan

Coordinates: 25°00′44″N 121°27′56″E

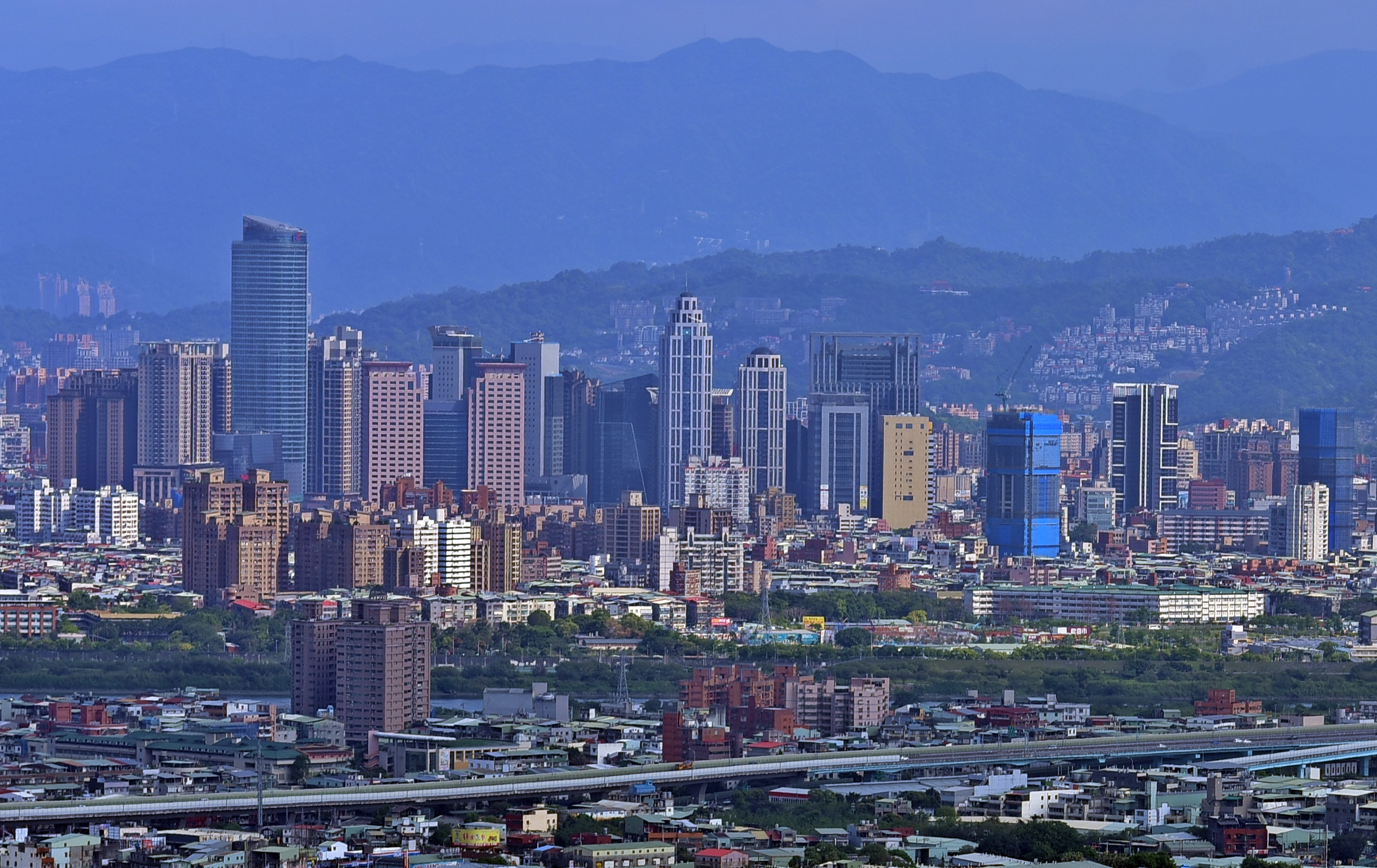
Skyline and buildings of Xinban Special District.

Xinban Special District (Chinese: 新板特區), also known as New Banqiao Station Special Zone, is located in Banqiao District, New Taipei, Taiwan. The total area of Xinban Special District is 54 hectares. It was designed in the 1990s and developed from the 2000s onward, when New Taipei was still Taipei County. Xinban Special District is the prime central business district, administration center, shopping center, and transport hub of New Taipei City. Important infrastructure, such as Banqiao station, New Taipei City Hall, New Taipei Citizen Square and NTPC Banqiao Bus Station, is located within this area.

== Historical Development ==
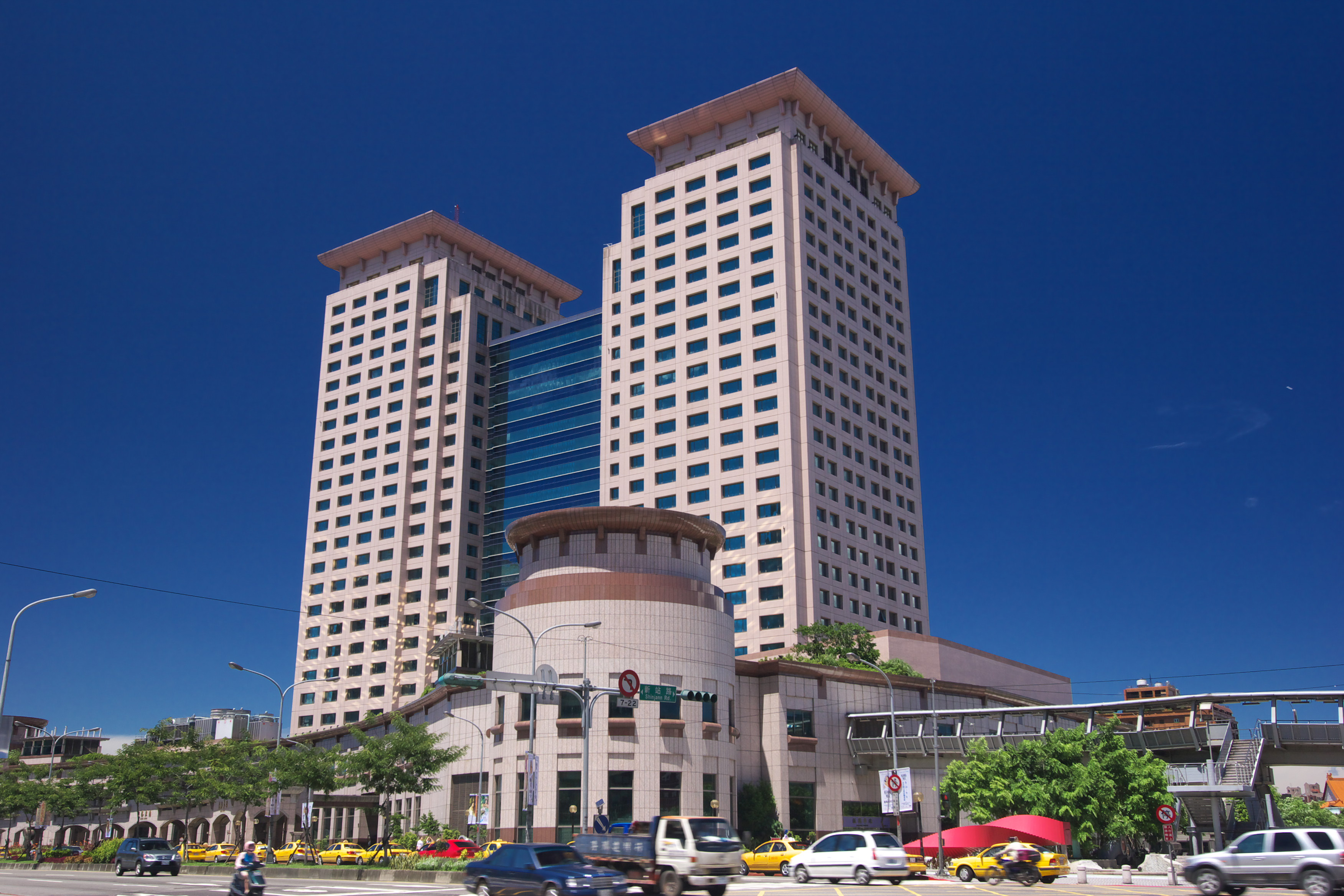
Banqiao Station building

The old Banqiao Station of the Taiwan Railway was built in 1952 near the Fuzhong metro station. Before the 1990s, when the Taipei Metro did not share the commuter transportation in Greater Taipei, its daily inbound and outbound passengers reached more than 60,000 passengers, the station with the second most traffic on the entire line, after Taipei Main Station. Since the old Banqiao Station could not handle the growing number of passengers, and the surrounding hinterland was limited, the area around the station was purchased by the Taipei County Government to build the new Banqiao Station (while the railway was underground). The above area covers an area of about 19 hectares, which was the earliest prototype of the Xinban Special District. The scope and planning of the Xinban Special District was later upgraded to the current 54-hectare area with reference to the research conclusions of the Institute of Architecture and Urban-Rural Development of National Taiwan University on the urban and rural development of Taipei County to construct a CBD on the west bank of Tamsui River, and promote the relocation of the former Taipei County Government Building in Fuzhong.

There are currently 4 department stores in Xinban Special District, forming the Xinban Commercial District. Department stores in the commercial district include Far Eastern Department Store, Global Mall Banqiao Station, Mega City, and Eslite Bookstore Xinban Store. Since 2010, Xinban Special District also hosts the annual Christmasland in New Taipei City, which is Taiwan's largest Winter Festival, attracting up to 6 million visitors annually.

== Main Buildings ==
Block	Name	Floor	Height (m)	Floor Area (m^{2})	Status	Completed	Usage	Note
Government	New Taipei City Hall	33	140.45	159,508.29	Completed	2003	Government	
Government	Revenue Service Office, New Taipei City Government	10	38.3	23,126.82	Completed	2001	Government	
Station	Banqiao Station	25	116.8	310,207	Completed	1999	Station	
Special 1-1	Modesty Home	26	122.3	26,363.09	Completed	2013	Residential	
Special 2-1	Hi Mall	16	98.95	58,979.47	Closed	2010	Closed for renovation	
Special 2-1	Taipower Xinmin Office Building	17	93.8	48,192.54	Completed	2015	Government	
Special 2-2	Panhsin Twin Towers	34	182.93	100,670.03	Completed	2009	Office; Commercial (Eslite Bookstore Xinban Store); Residential	
Special 2-2	Shin Kong Life Xinban Financial Building	17	78.95	26,874.31	Completed	2017	Office	
Special 2-2	Caesar Park Hotel Banqiao	31	141.4	92,561.895	Completed	2017	Hotel	
Special 2-3	Mega City	13	68	131,730.59	Completed	2011	Commercial	
Special 2-3	Far Eastern Mega Tower	50	220.6	122,929.02	Completed	2013	Commercial; Office	
Special 2-6	Bridge Upto Zenith	37	146.1	170,872.1	Completed	2012	Residential	

== Transportation ==
=== Rail ===
- Metro
  - Taipei Metro
    - Bannan line : Banqiao station
    - Circular line : Banqiao station
- Taiwan Railway
  - Taiwan Trunk Line: Banqiao station

=== Road ===
- Provincial Highway 3
- Provincial Highway 64
- Xianmin Boulevard
- Hansheng East Road

== Gallery ==
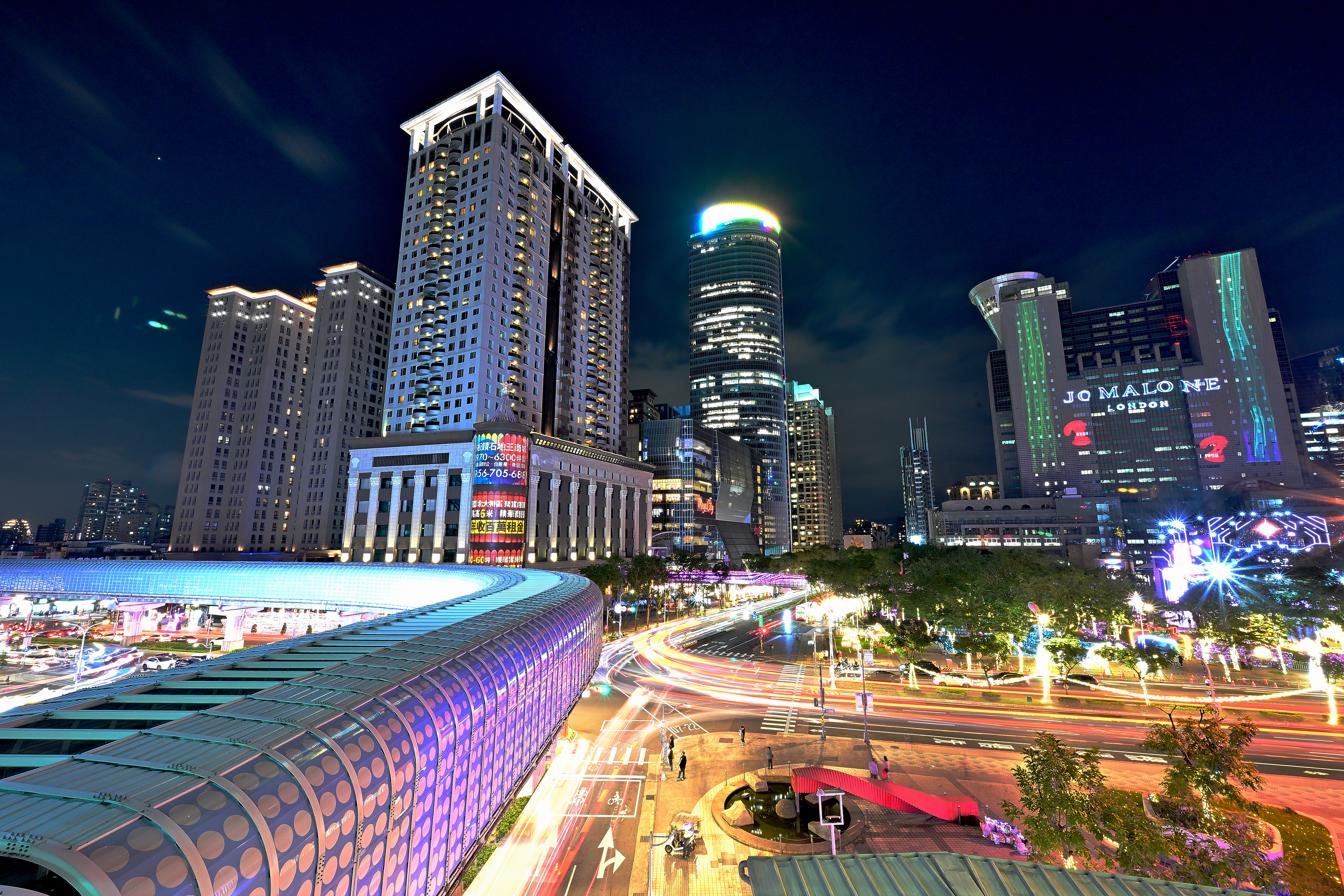
The district at night

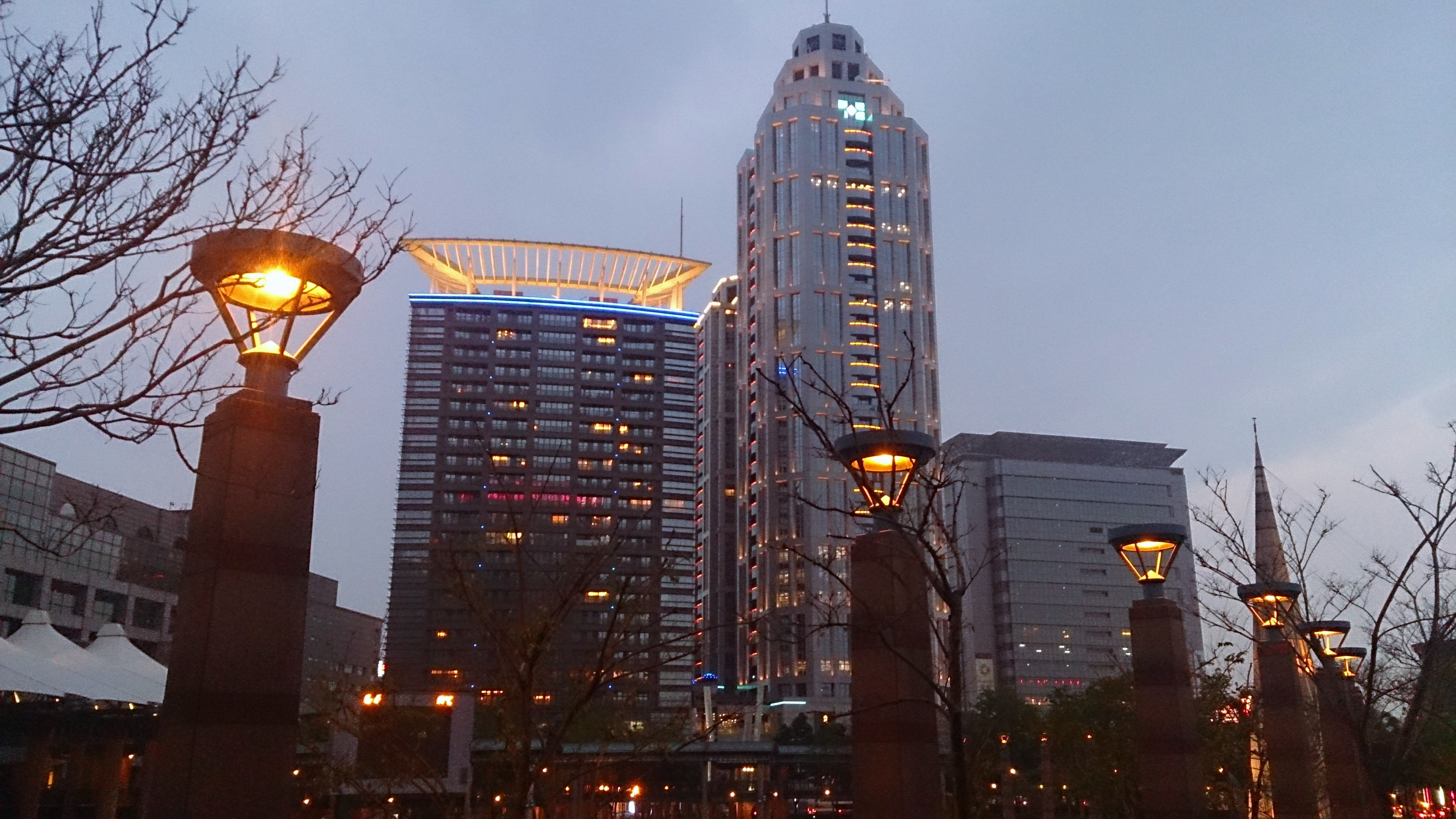
Views from Citizens Square

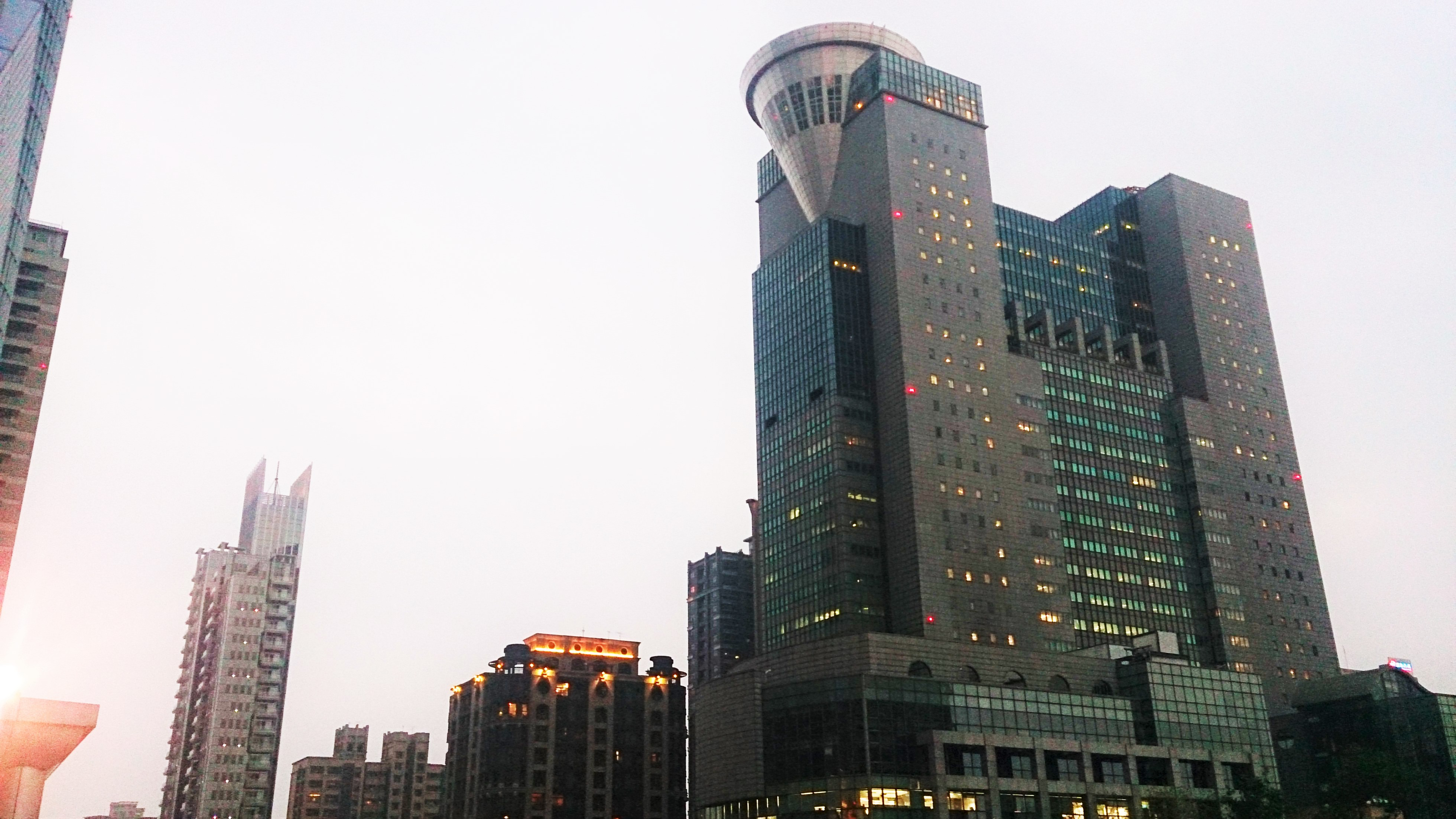

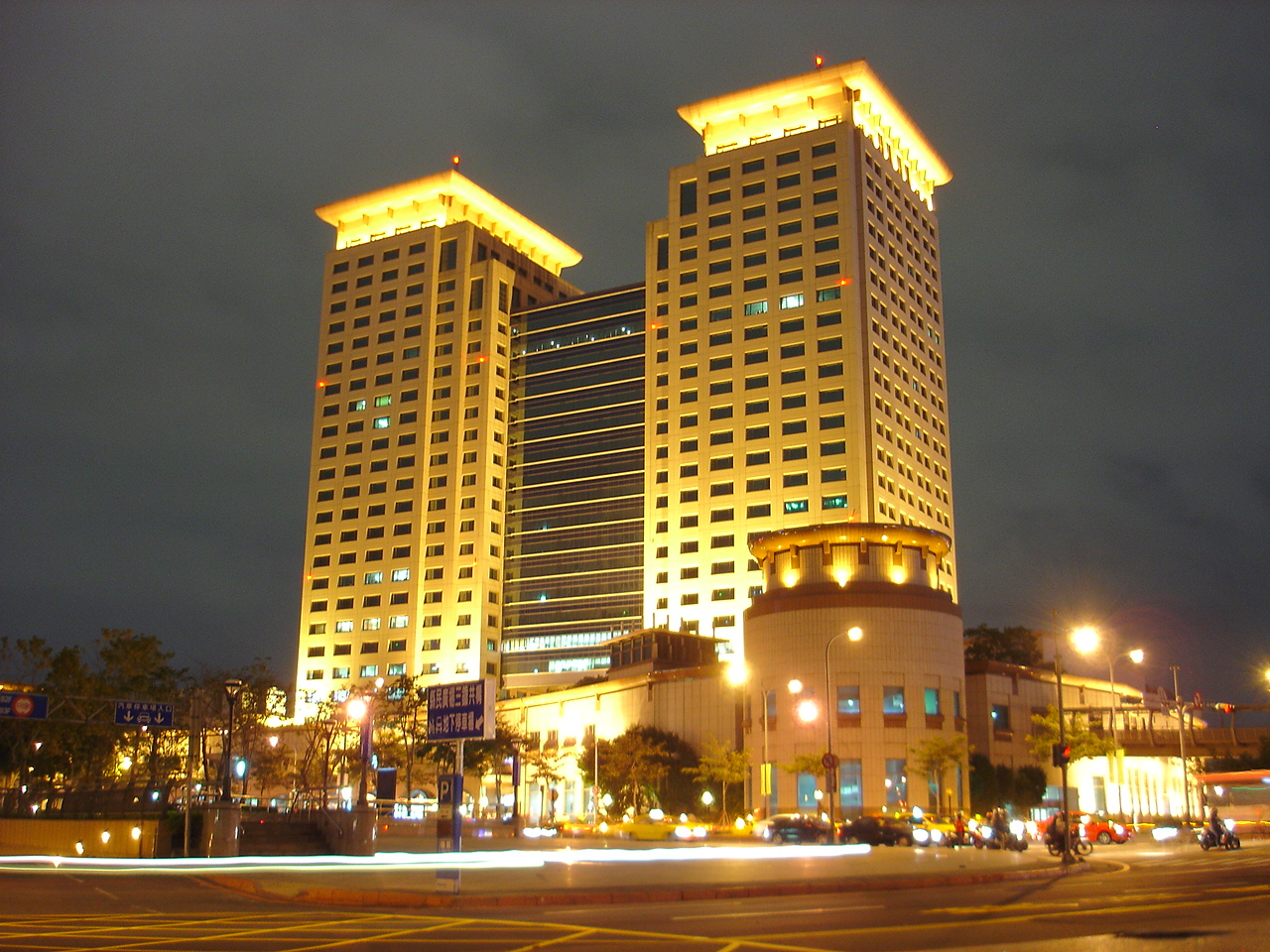
Banqiao Station at night

== See also ==
- Xinyi Planning District
- Xinzhuang Sub-city Center
- Taoyuan Zhongzheng Arts and Cultural Business District
- Qingpu Special District
- Urban planning in Taiwan
