= Governor of Taiwan =

Governor of Taiwan may refer to:

- Governor of Formosa, appointed during the Dutch rule period
- Governor of Fujian-Taiwan (福建臺灣巡撫), appointed during the late Qing rule period
- Governor-General of Taiwan, appointed during the Japanese rule period
- Governor of Taiwan Province, appointed during the Republic of China period
- A hypothetical Governor of Taiwan Provincial People's Government claimed by the People's Republic of China
