= Xinzhuang Joint Office Tower =

Government office building in Xinzhuang, New Taipei, Taiwan

Xinzhuang Joint Office Tower, Executive Yuan
- 行政院新莊聯合辦公大樓
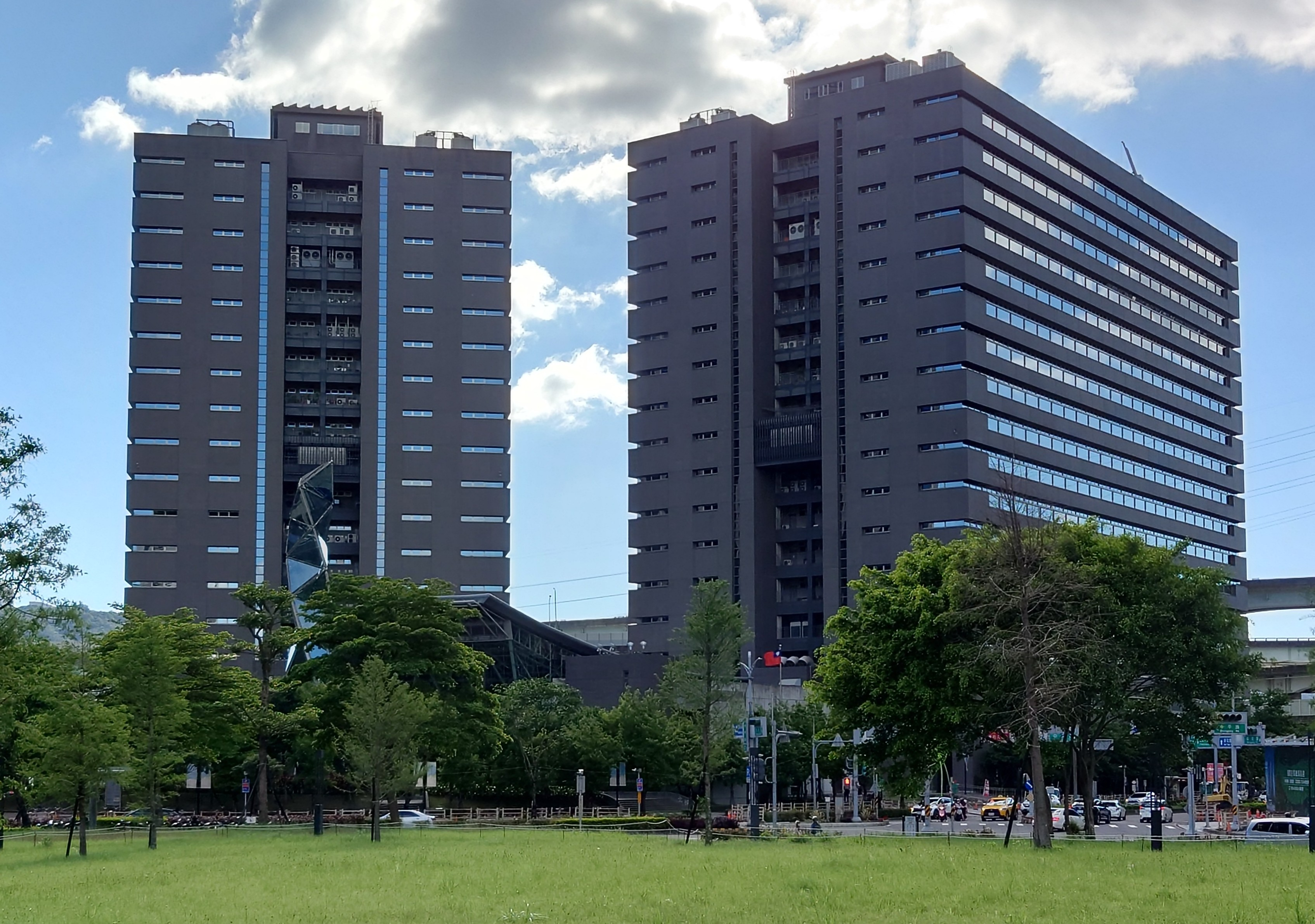
- Interactive map of the Xinzhuang Joint Office Tower, Executive Yuan area

General information
- Type: government office building
- Location: Xinzhuang, New Taipei, Taiwan
- Coordinates: 25°3′23.1″N 121°26′35.6″E
- Completed: 13 June 2013
- Cost: NT$6,989,100,000

Design and construction
- Architects: M. H. Wu & Associates
- Main contractor: Fu Tsu Construction Co., Ltd., Fure-Lin Engineering Co., Ltd.

Website
- Official website (in Chinese)

Xinzhuang Joint Office Tower, Executive Yuan (traditional Chinese: 行政院新莊聯合辦公大樓; simplified Chinese: 行政院新庄联合办公大楼; pinyin: Xíngzhèng Yuàn Xīnzhuāng Liánhé Bàngōng Dàlóu) is a joint Republic of China government buildings in Xinzhuang District, New Taipei, Taiwan.

== History ==
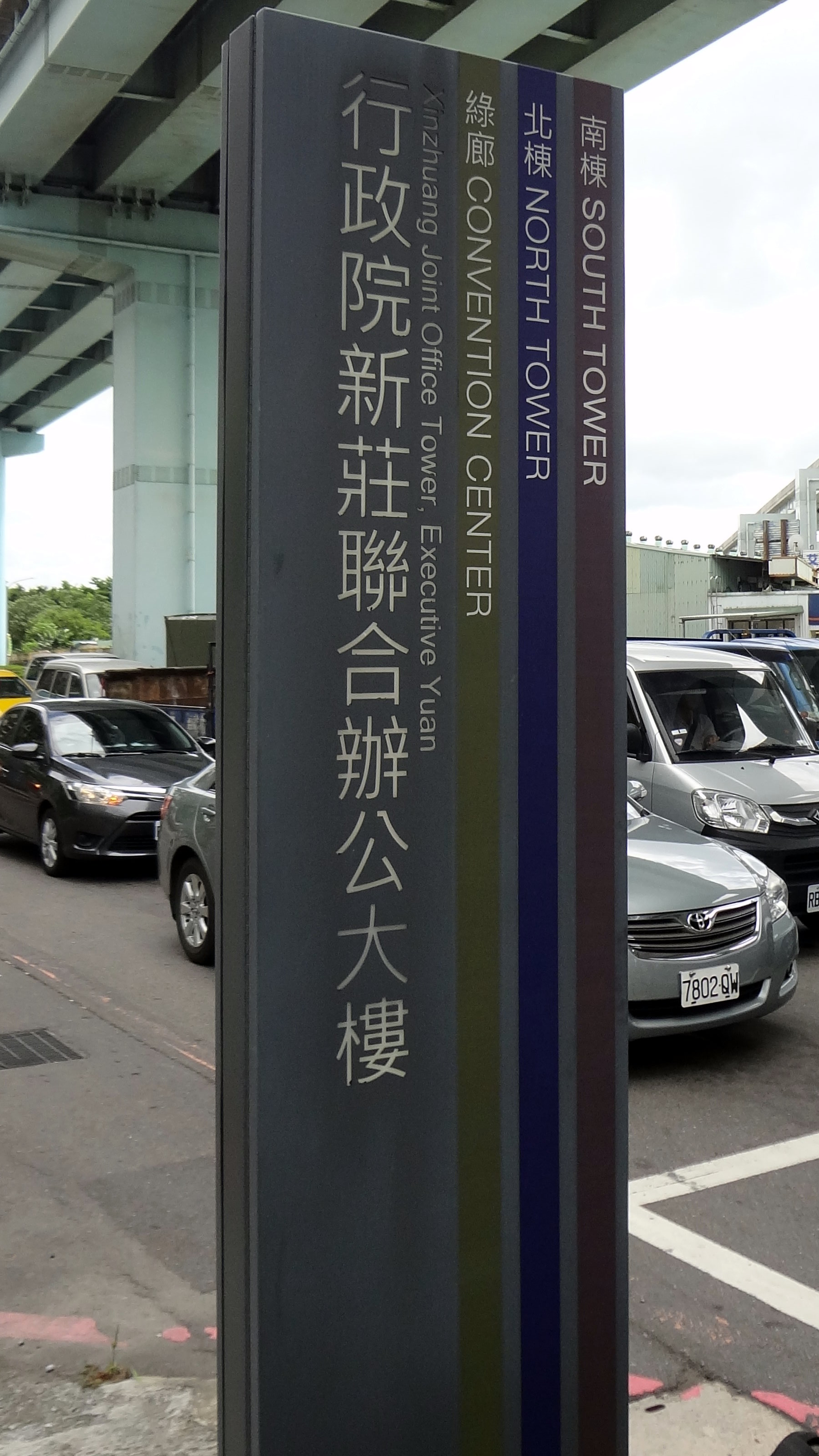
Building name sign of Xinzhuang Joint Office Tower, Executive Yuan

The construction of the buildings were completed on 13 June 2013. All of the relevant government agencies then moved to the building in September 2013.

== Architecture ==
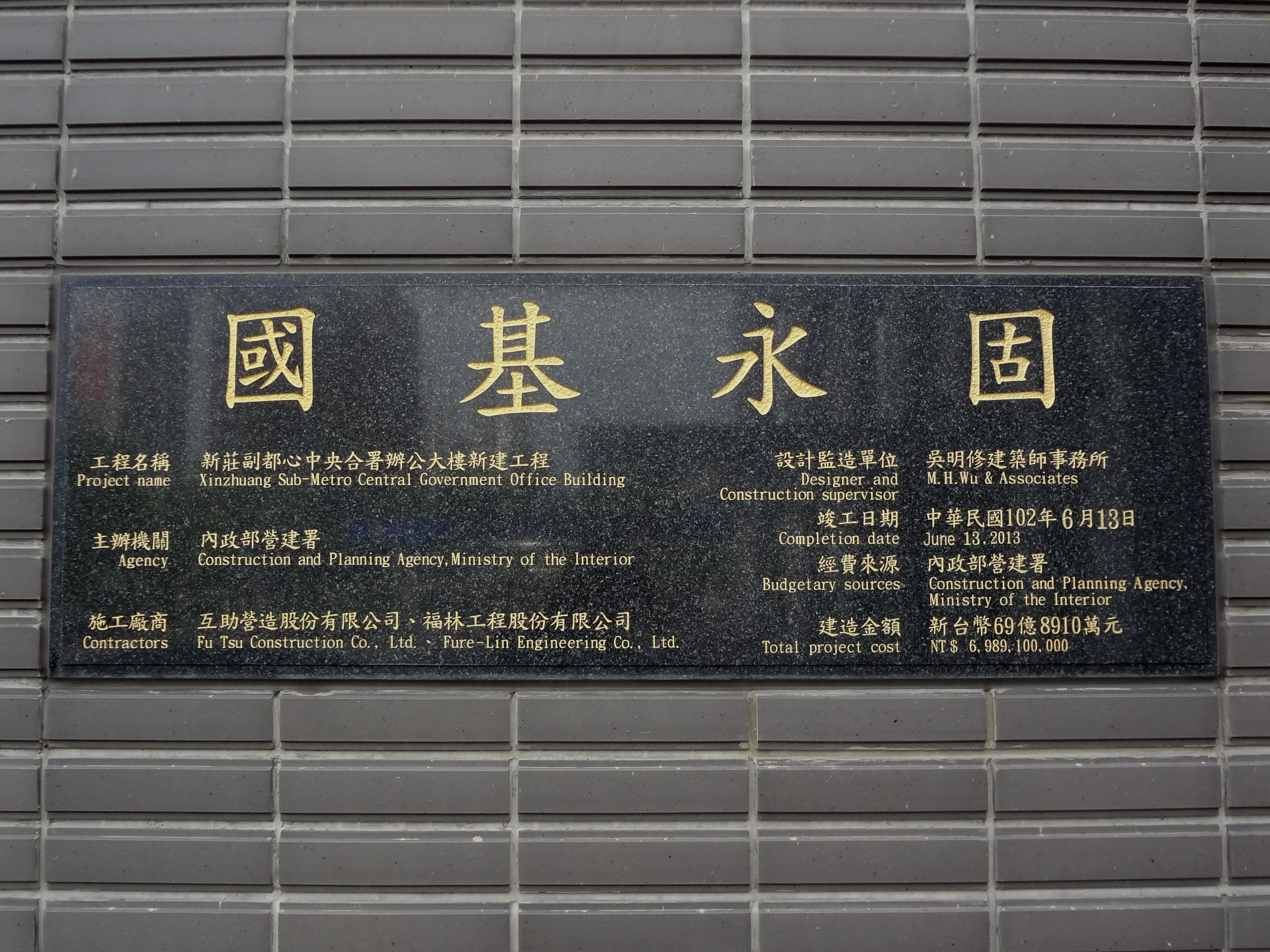
Xinzhuang Joint Office Tower, Executive Yuan completion plate

The buildings were designed by M. H. Wu & Associates with a construction budget of NT$6,989,100,000. It consists of two towers, which are North Tower and South Tower. The building houses the headquarters of some ministries or councils of the central government, including Council of Indigenous Peoples, Hakka Affairs Council and the Ministry of Culture.

== Transportation ==
The buildings are accessible within walking distance south of Xinzhuang Fuduxin Station of Taipei Metro.

== See also ==
- Executive Yuan
