= Taipei New Year's Eve Party =

New Year's Eve celebration in Taipei

Taipei New Year's Eve Party 台北最High新年城
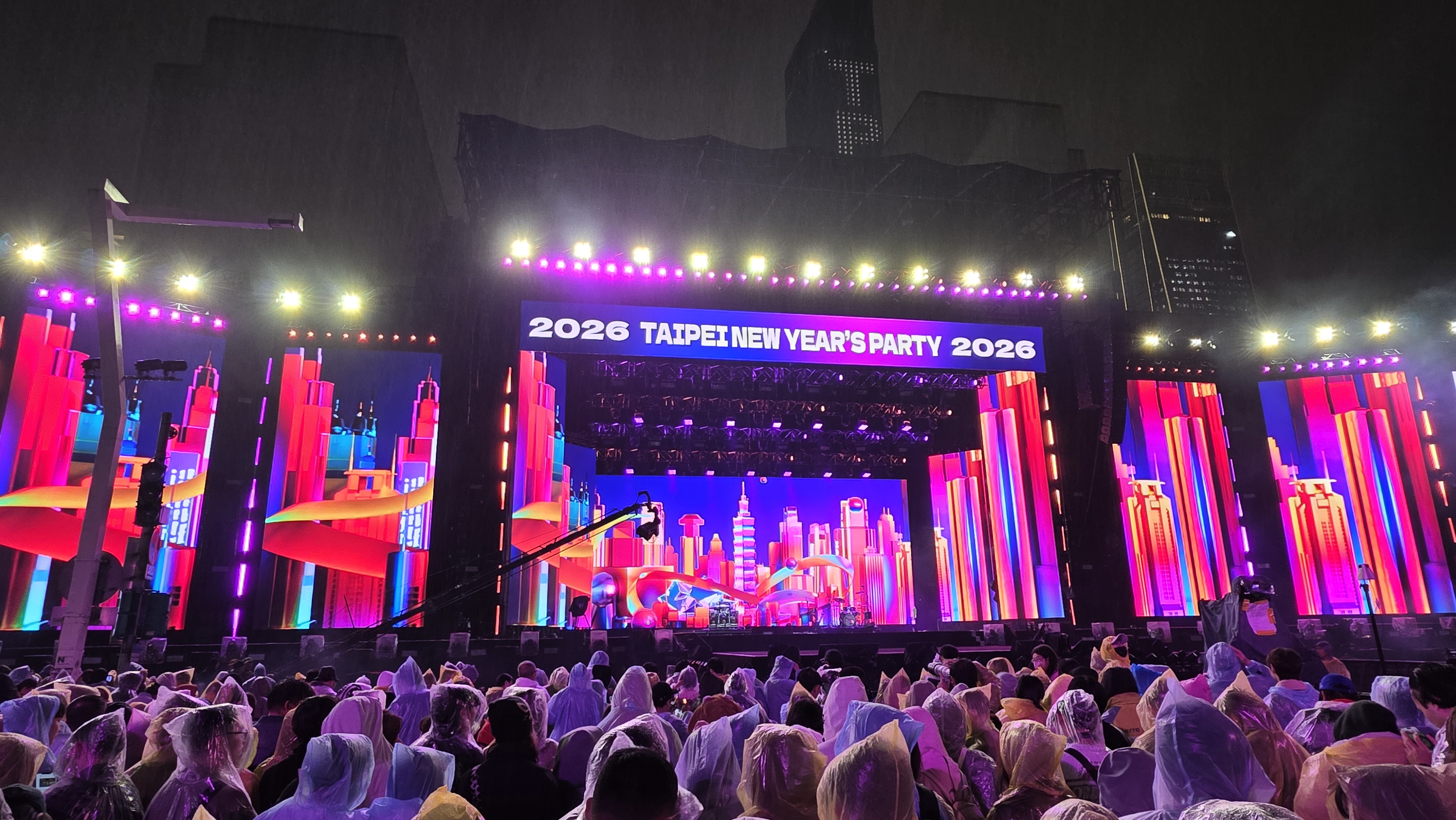
- Genre: New Year's Eve event
- Date: December 31 - January 1
- Begins: 19:00
- Ends: 1:00 (TST)
- Frequency: Annual
- Location: Taipei City Hall Square
- Inaugurated: December 31, 2003; 22 years ago
- Founder: Chen Shui-bian
- Attendance: Chiang Wan-an, Mayor of Taipei; Janet Chia, President of Taipei 101
- Budget: NT$ 30M (2026 event)
- Patron: CTI Television (2026 event)
- Organizer: Department of Information and Tourism, Taipei City Government; Taipei 101
- Sponsor: Pending (2026 event)
- Website: 2026newyear.taipei

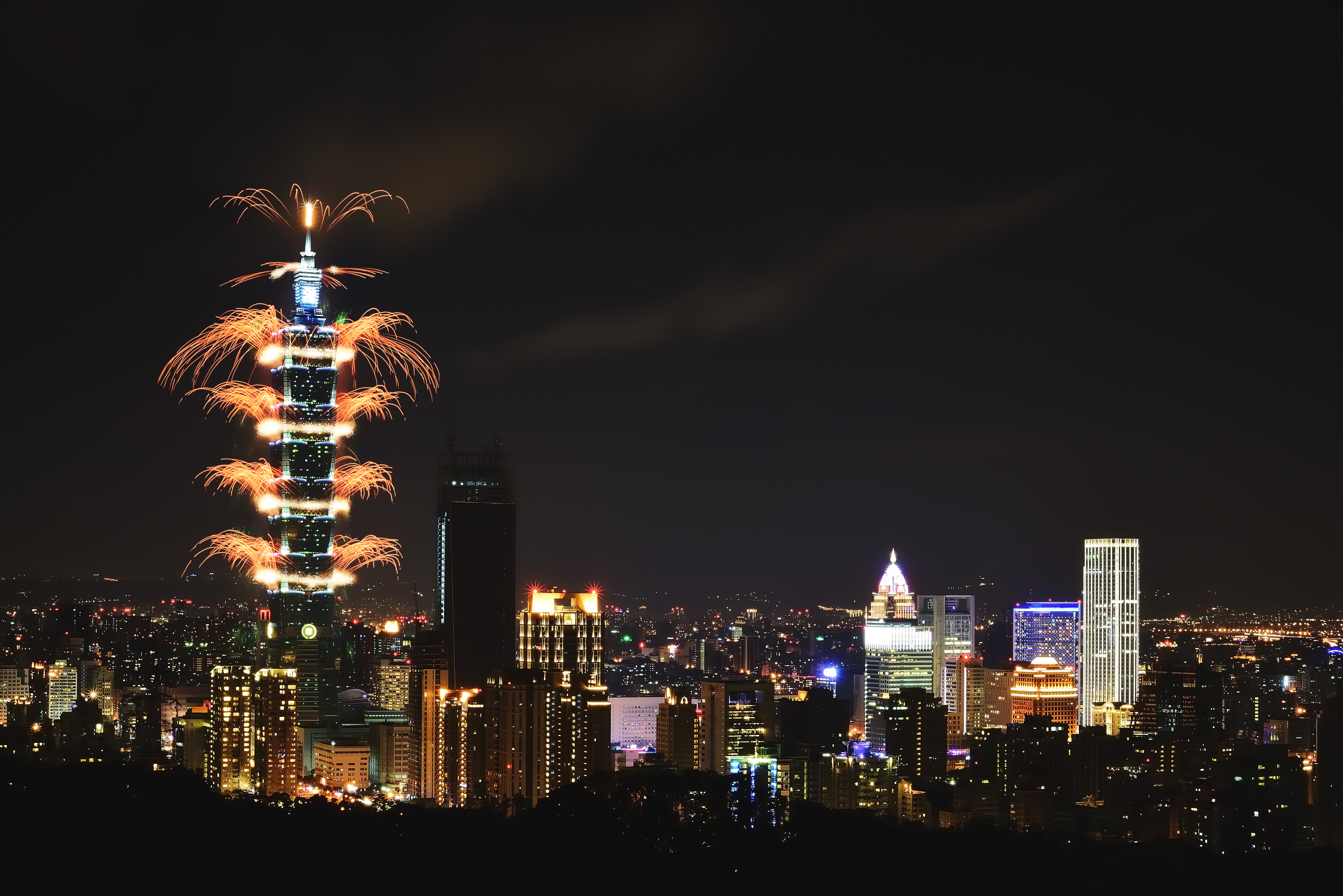
View of Taipei 101 during the 2017 Taipei New Year's Eve Party.

The Taipei New Year's Eve Party (Chinese: 台北最High新年城; pinyin: Táiběi Zuì High Xīnnián Chéng) is a New Year's Eve celebration that takes place in Taipei, Taiwan. Visitors gather at the Taipei City Hall and have a clear view of Taipei 101, which is surrounded by fireworks at midnight. The first Taipei New Year's Eve party was on 31 December 2003.

Decorations are put up starting in early December. During the celebration on December 31, music artists from around the world put on live performances throughout the day.

== History ==
In December 1994 Chen Shui-bian announced the first government-hosted New Year's Eve Party in Taipei. Taipei 101 was first used as the center of a countdown show during the 2003-2004 new year. The countdown show aimed to challenge the popularity of the New York Times Square Ball. Although Taipei 101 was still under construction during this time, they did a light show.

- 2003–2004: Building still under construction. Spinning lights on the Outdoor Observatory (floor 91) provided a display of sound and lights, but no fireworks were launched.
- 2004–2005: Grand opening of Taipei 101 celebrated with the first fireworks display. The show lasted 35 seconds. fireworks were launched from section balconies. Festivities included all-day performances by famous entertainers and ceremonial visits by national dignitaries.
- 2005–2006: Show extended to 128 seconds. Sony sponsored the show, which concluded with a display of the brand name in lights.
- 2006–2007: Show extended to 188 seconds; 9,000 fireworks were launched. This was Sony's second time sponsoring the event.
- 2007–2008: Show same length but featuring 12,000 fireworks. Event Sponsor Taiwan Tourism Bureau ended the show with a display, in lights, of a heart over the word 'Taiwan'.
- 2008–2009: The theme was "Love Taiwan With Your Heart in 2009". The show ended with a heart appearing over the word 'Taiwan' on the light display on the side of the building.
- 2009–2010: The show to launched 16,000 fireworks and lasted 188 seconds.
- 2010–2011: Show extended to 288 seconds (100 sec. for flash effects and 188 sec. for fireworks) and included 30,000 fireworks. It was designed by Cai Guo-Qiang, the artist also responsible for Beijing Olympics and World Expo Shanghai's fireworks. The display on the building was accompanied by fireworks going off other buildings in the Xinyi financial district. One concept was for fireworks to spiral up and down the building like dragon crawling.
- 2011–2012: The show was shortened to 202 seconds.
- 2012–2013: The show was designed by the French pyrotechnics company Groupe F and was 198 seconds in length, featuring 22,000 fireworks launched to an adaptation of Igor Stravinsky's The Firebird. The theme was "Swing for the Future". The words "Time for Taiwan" (both in English and Mandarin Chinese) were displayed in lights at the building to promote Taiwan Tourism Bureau's advertising campaign.
- 2013–2014: The show lasted 218 seconds and a thematic music was created for the first time by local musicians to commemorate Taipei 101's 10th anniversary.
- 2014–2015: The show performed for 218 seconds. iSee Taiwan Foundation sponsored the fireworks to promote the beauty of Taiwanese culture and creativity. The firework music was arranged by Mr. Lee, Che-Yi, blended with the famous classical song The four seasons by Vivaldi and many Taiwanese folk music. Performed and recorded by Taipei Symphony Orchestra.
- 2015–2016: It is the fourth time Groupe F designed the firework show for Taipei 101, with a green theme "Nature is Future". The 238-second display included 30,000 fireworks. It is also the first time to have professional climbers to settle the firework racks onto the building façades. Mr. Lee, Chi-Yi once again arranged the music mixed with international and Taiwanese rhythms reflecting the nature-related theme and Evergreen Symphony Orchestra played the role of performance. A young Taiwanese IT design company BungBungame became the exclusive sponsor supporting a symbolic event showing Taiwan to the world.
- 2019–2020: Taipei 101 displayed a show with the theme of "Light of Hope, Taiwan", launching 16,000 fireworks at midnight.
