= Taipei City Hall Bus Station =

Buildings and structures in Taipei

Taipei City Hall Bus Station 市府轉運站
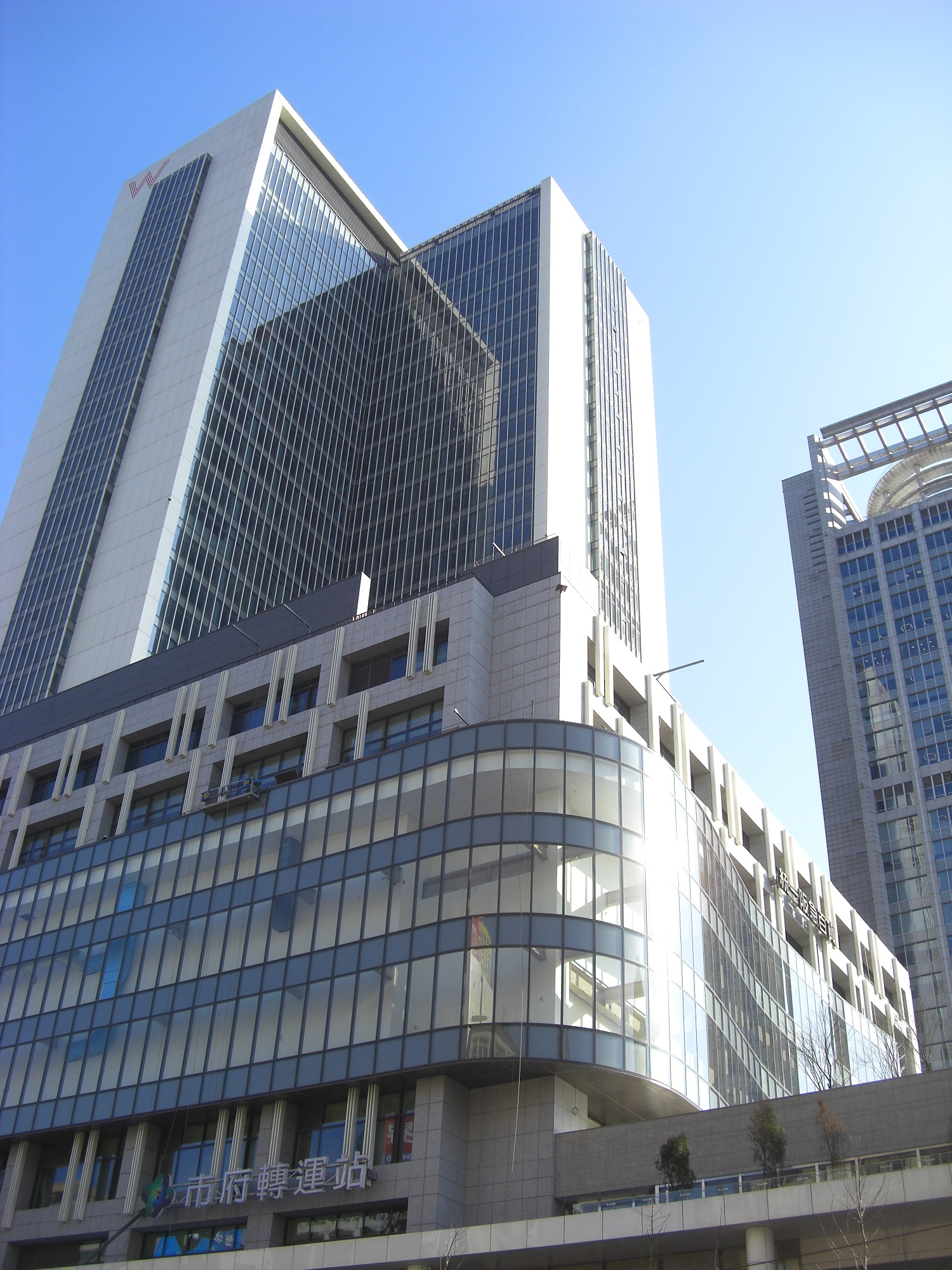
- Taipei City Hall Bus Station

General information
- Location: Keelung Road; Xinyi, Taipei; Taiwan
- Coordinates: 25.0405°N 121.5648°E
- Operated by: Uni-President Enterprises Corporation
- Connections: Bus terminal

Construction
- Structure type: At-grade

History
- Opened: 5 August 2010
Location

Taipei City Hall Bus Station 市府轉運站
- Interactive map of the Taipei City Hall Bus Station 市府轉運站 area

General information
- Status: Completed
- Type: Bus station, Department store, Hotel
- Location: No. 10, Section 5, Zhongxiao East Road, Xinyi Special District, Xinyi, Taipei, Taiwan
- Coordinates: 25.0405°N 121.5648°E
- Construction started: May 26, 2006
- Completed: Oct 27, 2009

Height
- Height: 150 metres (490 ft)

Technical details
- Floor count: 30
- Floor area: 144,037.15 m^{2} (1,550,403.0 sq ft)
- Lifts/elevators: unknown

The Taipei City Hall Bus Station (Chinese: 市府轉運站; pinyin: Shì fǔ Zhuǎn Yùn Zhàn) is a mixed-used skyscraper complex located in Xinyi District, Taipei, Taiwan. The architectural height of the building is 150 m (490 ft) and it comprises 30 floors above ground.

The lower floors of the building serves as a transportation hub for bus and metro, with the metro's Taipei City Hall Station incorporated into the basement.

The 8th to 31st floors of the building house the W Taipei, a five-star hotel operated by W Hotels. It offers a total of 405 guest rooms. It started trial operations in February 2011, and official operations in March 2011.

== Overview ==
The station covers an area of 2,500 ping (7934 m^{2}) and operates using a BOT scheme for 50 years under Uni-President Enterprises Corporation. It is situated on the southeastern side of the intersection of Keelung Road and Zhongxiao East Road. The 150-meter tall station building has 31 stories above ground and 5 stories below. Plans for the station date back to 1998 under then-mayor Ma Ying-jeou.

It houses facilities for a shopping mall (Uni-President Hankyu Department Store) and hotel. The shopping mall has nine levels (including two underground) and has a total floor space of 8,000 ping (26,446 m^{2}). The mall was expected to open by October 2010. The station opened for service on 5 August 2010, and was estimated to serve around 10,000 bus commuters per day. The entire station complex was expected to serve 100,000 people per day. Since opening, ridership has been above expectations, with around 24,000 people using the bus services daily.

The bus station is aimed at reducing congestion at Taipei Bus Station near Taipei Main Station, as well as serving the bustling Xinyi District. In addition to short-distance bus services, many long-distance bus services to cities in northern and central Taiwan originate from the station.

== See also ==
- Taipei City Hall metro station
- Taipei Bus Station
- Yuanshan Bus Station
- Linkou Bus Station
