= Cosmos Hotel Taipei =

Hotel in Zhongzheng District, Taipei, Taiwan

- 臺北天成大飯店
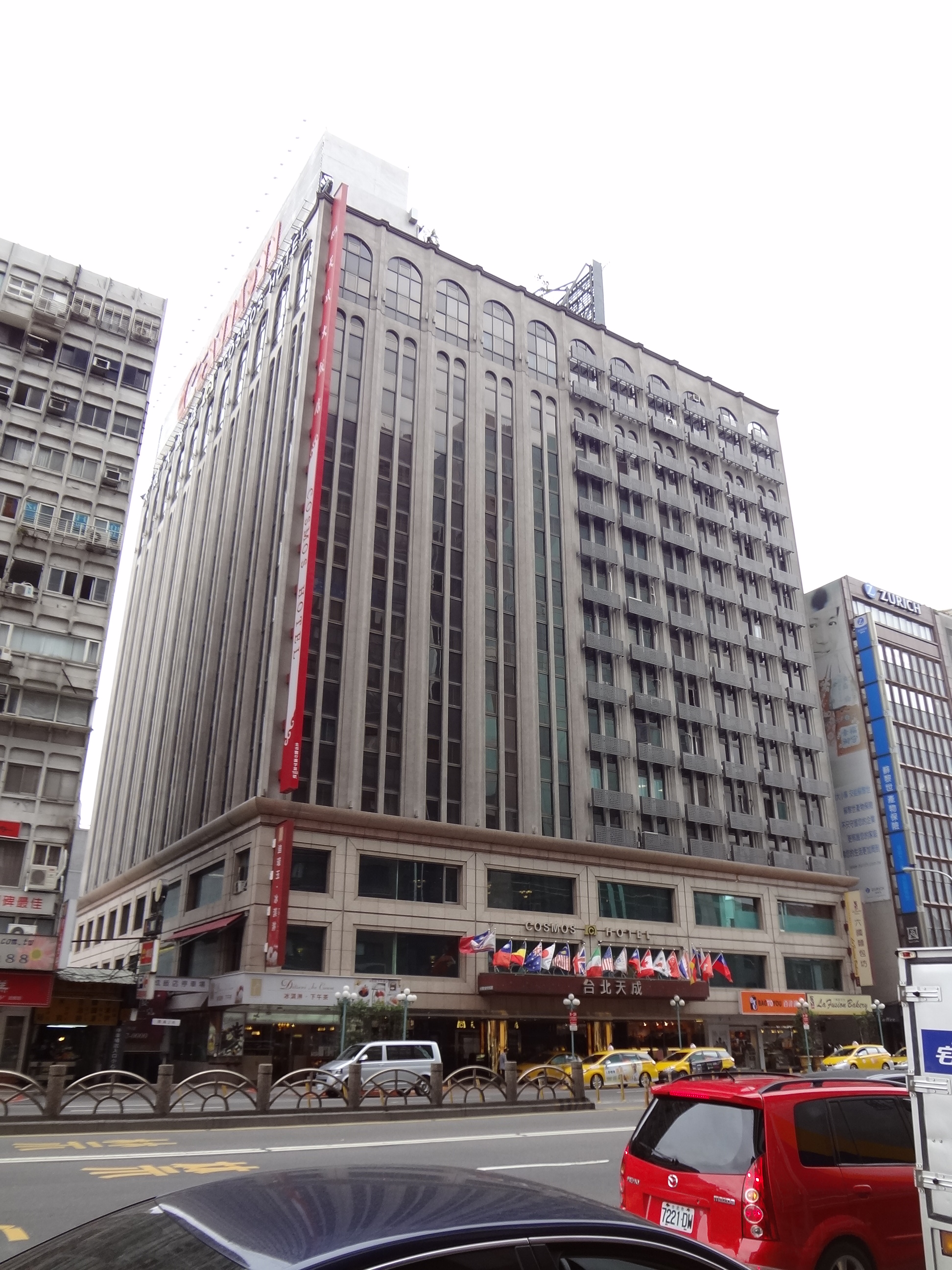
- The Cosmos Hotel Taipei in 2013
- Interactive map of the Cosmos Hotel Taipei area

General information
- Location: No. 43, Sec. 1, Zhongxiao W. Rd., Taipei City 100, Taiwan., Taipei, Taiwan
- Coordinates: 25°2′46.695″N 121°31′5.919″E

Technical details
- Floor count: 17

Other information
- Number of rooms: 226

Cosmos Hotel Taipei (traditional Chinese: 臺北天成大飯店; simplified Chinese: 台北天成大饭店; pinyin: Táiběi Tiānchéng Dà Fàndiàn) is a hotel located in the Zhongzheng District, Taipei, Taiwan, adjacent to Taipei Main Station, accessible through exit M3. The hotel opened in 1979, and is the first property of the Cosmos Hotels & Resort group. The hotel includes 226 rooms, multiple restaurants and bars, a fitness and wellness center, and banquet and conference facilities.

== History ==
Cosmos Hotel Taipei opened in 1979 as its group's inaugural hotel, and in 2011, the hotel underwent a major renovation in which both its interior and exterior were upgraded to "carry a sleek and modern look".

The hotel has been noted to historically have consistently elevated occupancy rates. In 2018, the hotel reportedly had a 93% occupancy rate, topping the charts of the Tourism Bureau for the seventh year in a row.

Tourism Bureau data notes that between January to March 2020, Tourism rates in Taiwan had plummeted by 40 percent, however, Cosmos Hotel & Resorts group had reported that its city hotels (including Cosmos Hotel Taipei) had nearly recovered to pre-COVID-19 levels of room occupancy.

== Transportation ==
Cosmos Hotel Taipei has been noted for its "convenient" location adjacent to the Taipei Main Station in western Taipei, where it is accessible via the M3 exit. As such, the Taipei Main Station links hotel guests to the MRT (metro), Taiwan High Speed Rail (THSR), Taiwan Railway (TRA), intercity buses, and local buses all in the same area.

== Facilities ==
The hotel itself has 226 hotel rooms in total and operates two restaurants: 翠庭中餐廳 (Jade Chinese Restaurant) and 百合西餐廳 (Lily Western Restaurant) with all-day meal service. In addition to this, there is also a coffee shop and gift shop on the lobby level.

Recreational amenities offered include a health club with gym equipment and a steam room. The hotel also includes multiple conference rooms, a banquet hall, and several smaller meeting rooms.

Officially, the hotel is rated four-stars by the Taiwan Tourism Bureau, Ministry of Transportation and Communications.

== 2023 Incident ==
On July 29, 2023, a 30-year-old drunk male hotel guest who was dining with colleagues on the third floor opened a banquet-hall window and climbed onto the windowsill to "goof around." The man eventually lost his footing and fell three stories, sustaining fatal head injuries.

== Gallery ==
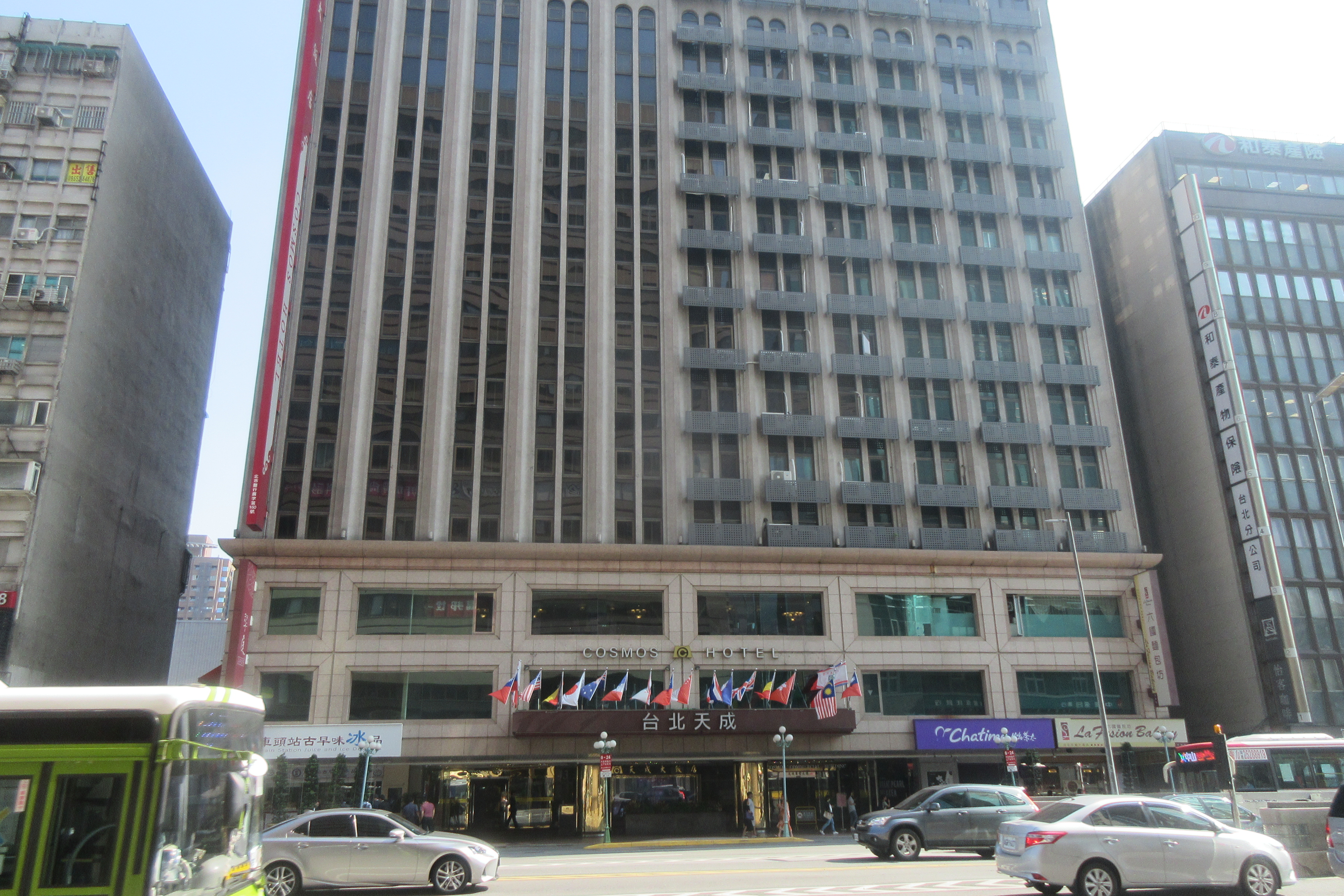
Frontal view of the hotel in August 2019

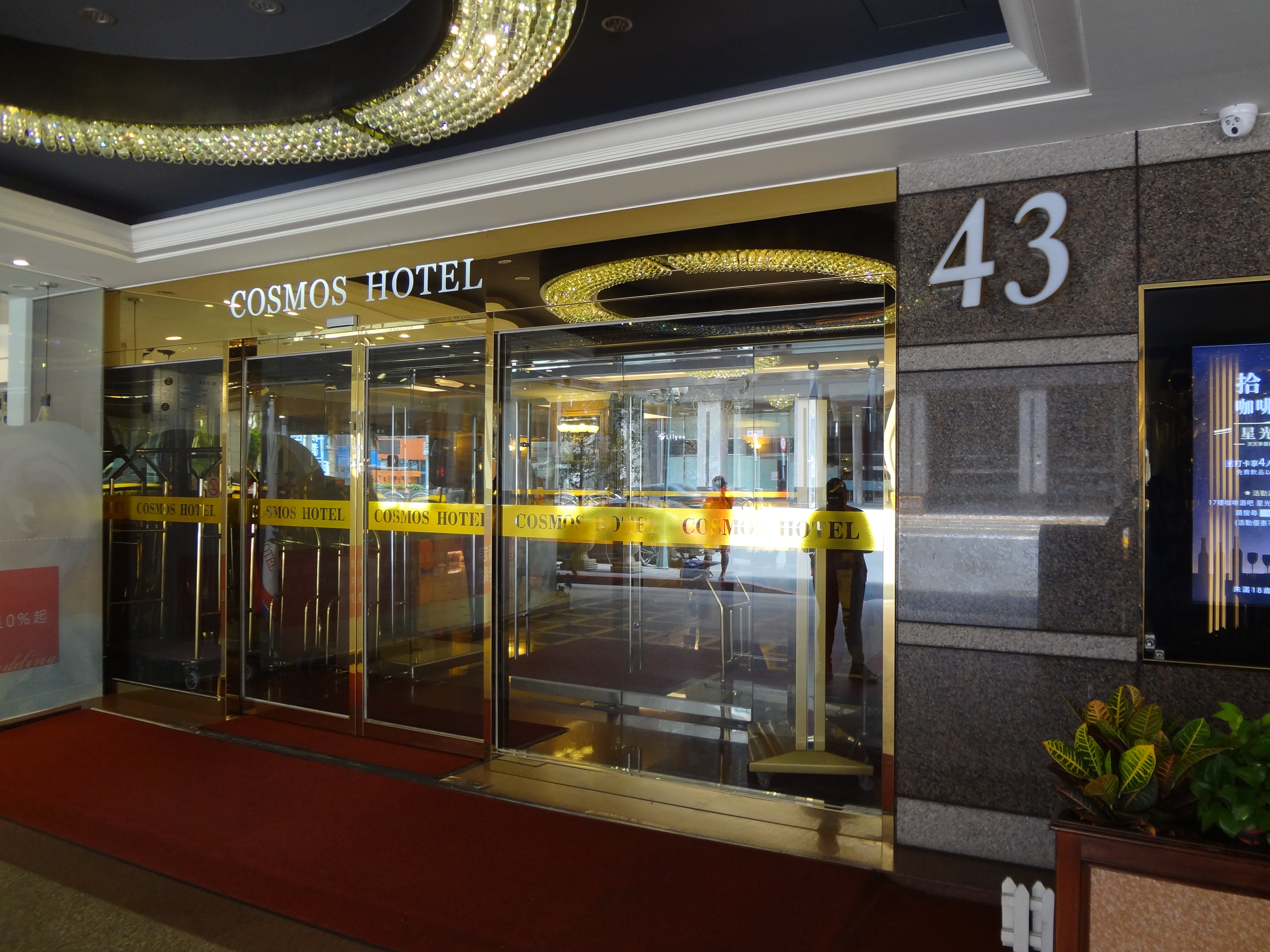
Entrance of the hotel in June 2017

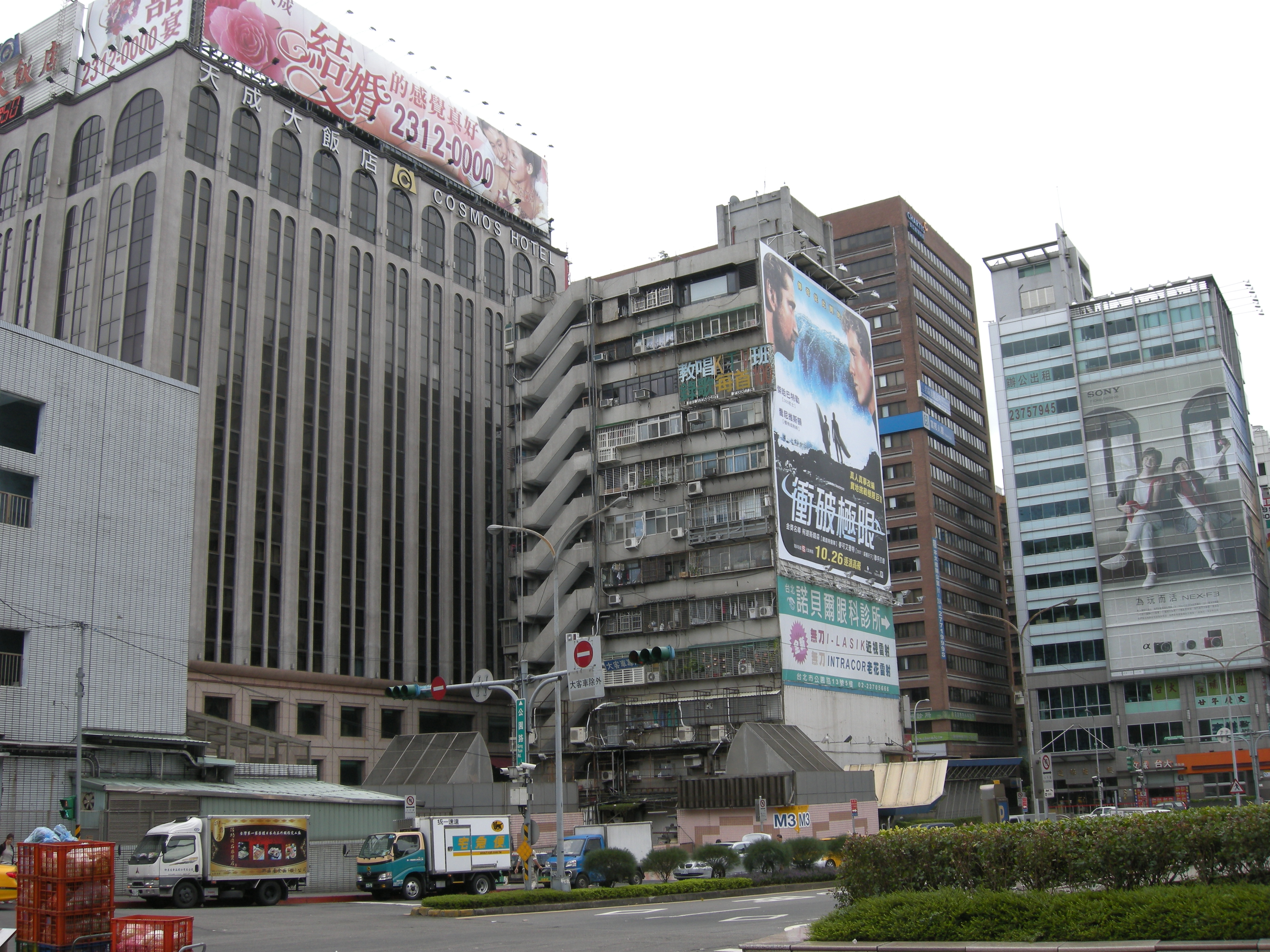
Street view of the hotel in October 2012

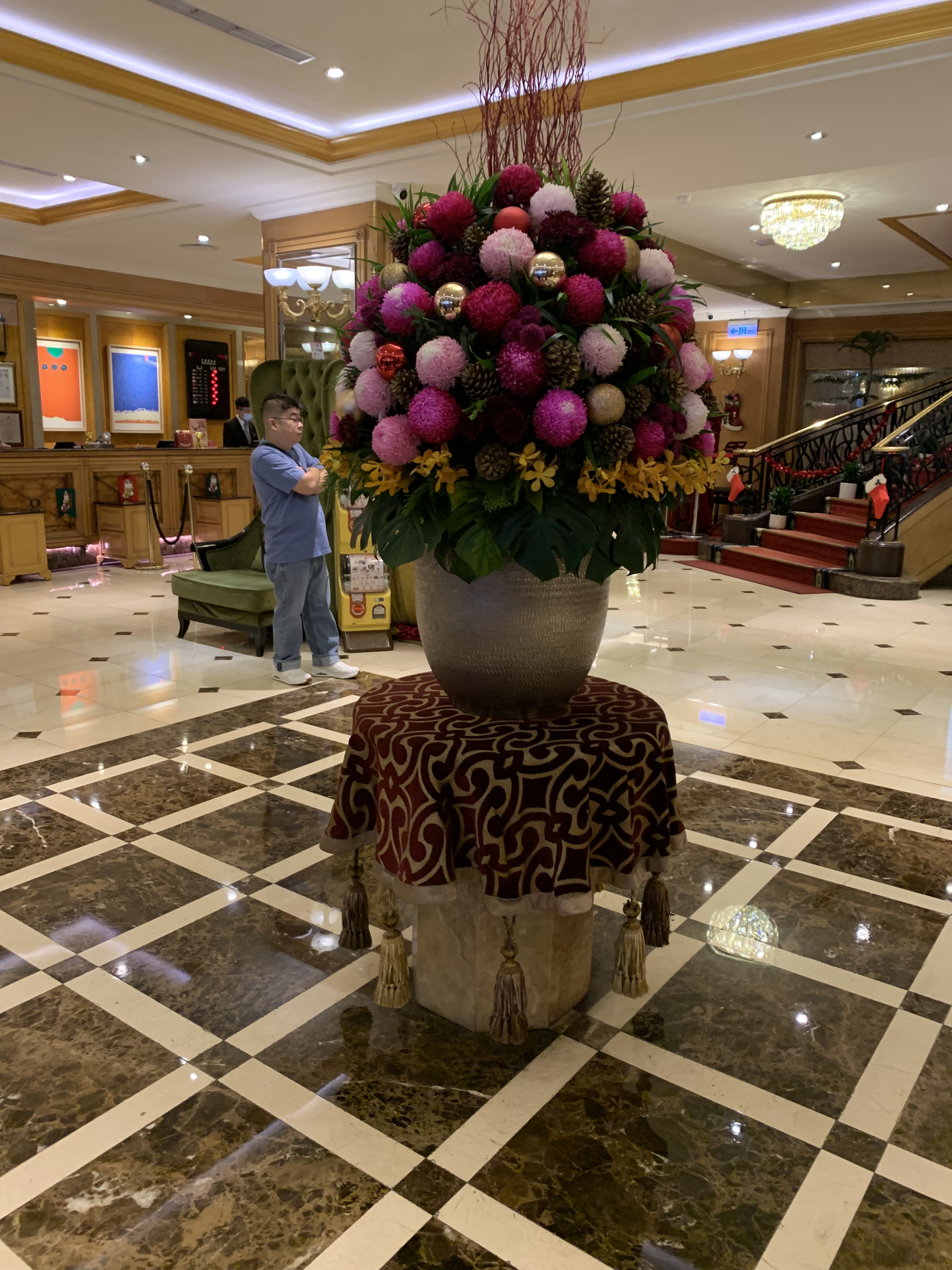
Lobby of the hotel in November 2025

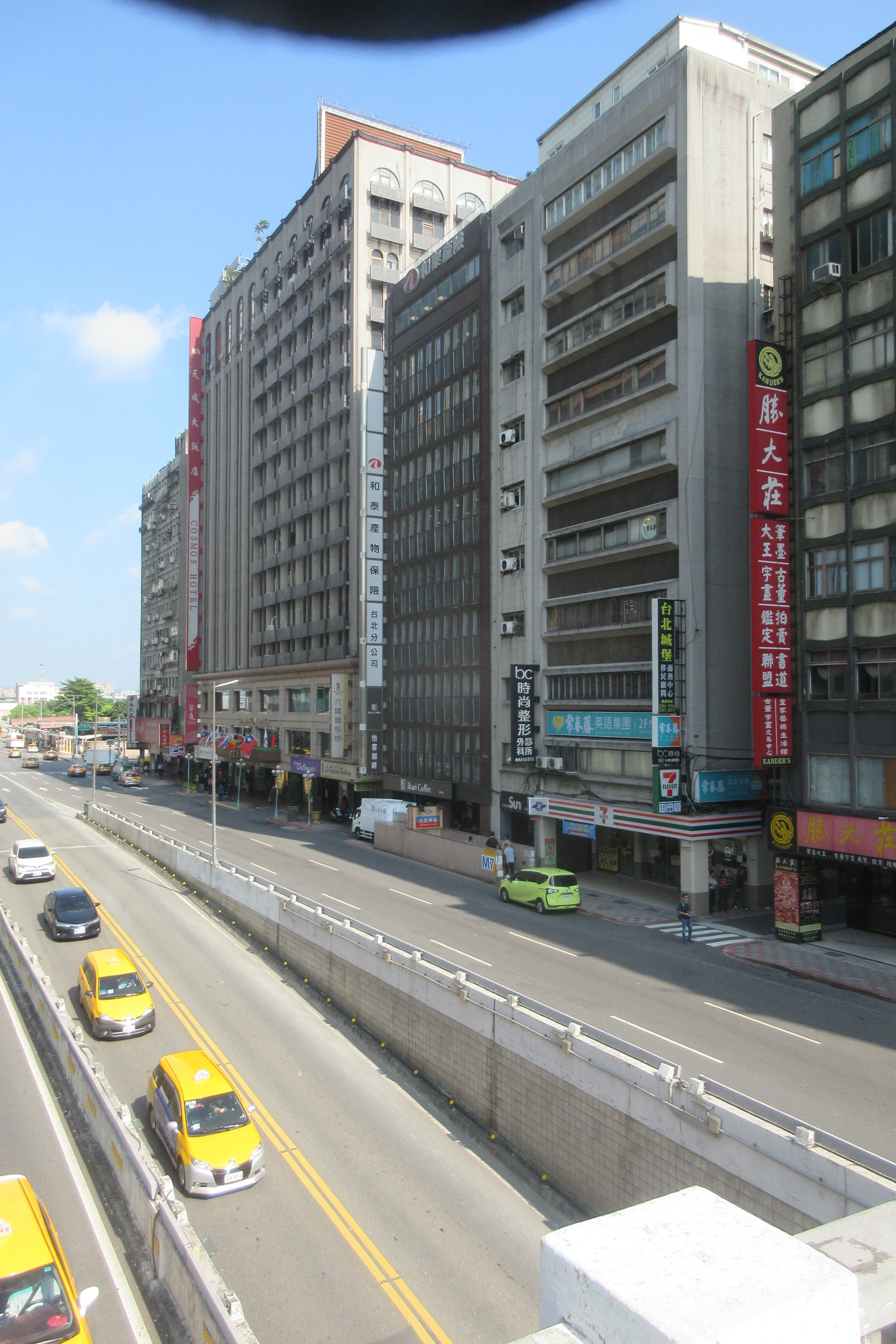
Alternate street view of the hotel in August 2019
