= Taipei Bus Station =

Bus station in Taipei, Taiwan

Coordinates: 25°02′57.6″N 121°31′00.7″E

Taipei Bus Station 台北轉運站
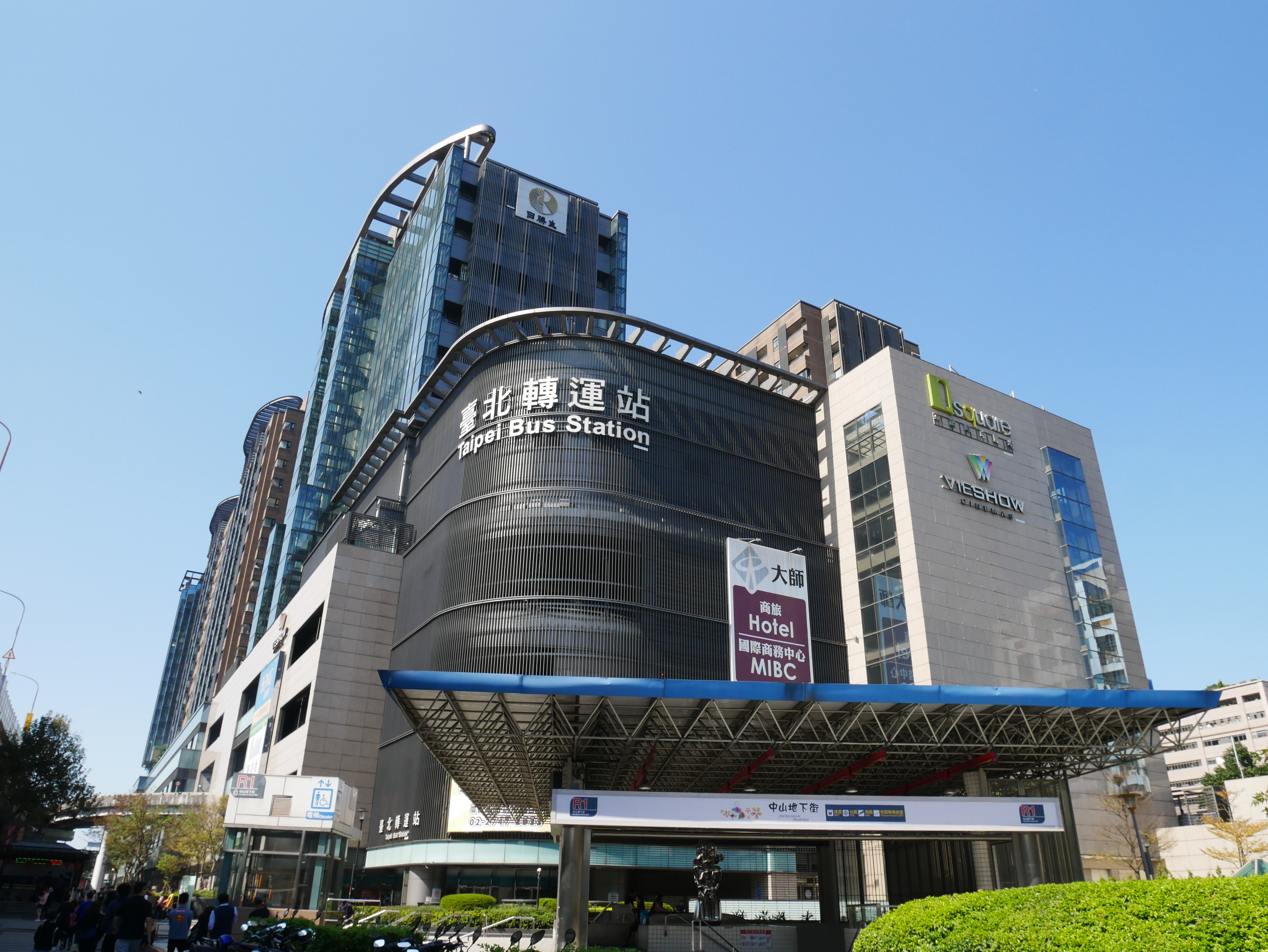
- Taipei Bus Station

General information
- Location: Datong, Taipei; Taiwan

Construction
- Structure type: Elevated

History
- Opened: 19 August 2009

The Taipei Bus Station (Chinese: 台北轉運站; pinyin: Táiběi Zhuǎnyùnzhàn) is a multi-use complex located next to Taipei Station in Datong District, Taipei, Taiwan. The complex houses the Taipei bus terminal station provided a number of intercity express bus routes which was inaugurated on 19 August 2009, as well as recreational and leisure facilities. The mall complex was inaugurated on 11 December 2009. The shopping mall part is called Qsquare.

== Facilities ==
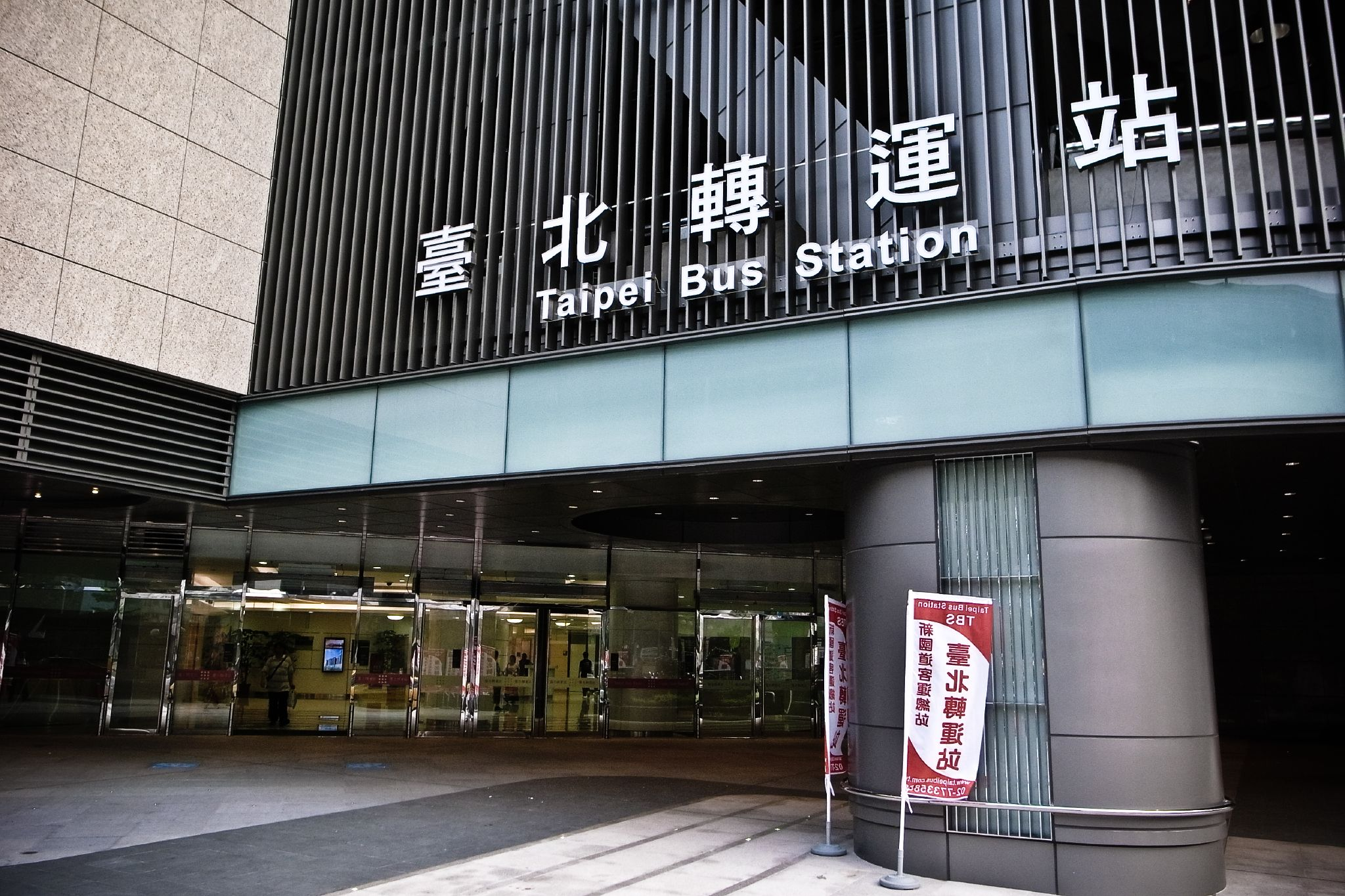
Taipei Bus Station entrance.

=== Intercity bus routes ===
- United Bus (UBus)
  - 1610:Taipei－Kaohsiung
  - 1611:Taipei－Tainan
  - 1613:Taipei－Pingtung
  - 1615:Taipei－Changhua
  - 1616:Taipei－Yuanlin
  - 1617:Taipei－Fengyuan—Dongshi District, Taichung
  - 1618:Taipei－Chiayi
  - 1619:Taipei－Chaoma—Taichung
  - 1620:Taipei－Hsinchu—Shuinan—Taichung
  - 1628:Taipei－Madou－Jali
  - 1629:Taipei－Syuejia, Linziliao
  - 1630:Taipei－Xigang
  - 1631:Taipei－Ershuei－Zhushan
  - 1632:Taipei－Ciaotun－Zhushan
  - 1633:Taipei－Beigang－Santiaolun
  - 1635:Taipei－Huwuei－Santiaolun
  - 1636:Taipei－Siluo－Syhu－Santiaolun
  - 1637:Taipei－Siluo－Lincuoliao－Santiaolun
  - 1638:Taipei－Puzi－Dongshi Township, Chiayi
  - 1639:Taipei－Budai
  - 1652:Taipei－Lugang－Fanyuan
- Kuo-Kuang Bus
  - 1820:Taipei－Lonntan－Zhudon
  - 1821:Taipei－Yuanshulin－Lonntan－Zhudon
  - 1822:Taipei－Hsinchu
  - 1823:Taipei－Zhunan
  - 1824:Taipei－Highway No.1－Miaoli
  - 1825:Taipei－Highway No.3－Miaoli
  - 1826:Taipei－Shuinan－Taichung
  - 1827:Taipei－Chaoma－Taichung
  - 1828:Taipei－Changhua
  - 1829:Taipei－Yuanlin
  - 1830:Taipei－Beidou
  - 1831:Taipei－Nantou
  - 1832:Taipei－Puli
  - 1833:Taipei－Sun Moon Lake
  - 1834:Taipei－Chiayi
  - 1835:Taipei－Chiayi－Alishan
  - 1836:Taipei－Chiayi－Xinying
  - 1837:Taipei－Tainan
  - 1838:Taipei－Kaohsiung
  - 1839:Taipei－Pingtung
- Howtai Bus
  - 2011:Taipei－Hsinchu
  - 2012:Taipei－Xinfong
- Ho-Hsin bus
  - 7500:Taipei－Chaoma－Xinying－Tainan
- Aloha Bus
  - 3888:Taipei－Chaoma－Chiayi
  - 3999:Taipei－Chaoma－Kaohsiung
- KML BUS
  - 1915:(Banqiao－)Taipei－FuXing S. Rd.－Jiaoxi－Yilan－Luodong
  - 1915:(Banqiao－)Taipei－HuanDong Blvd.－Jiaoxi－Yilan－Luodong
  - 1916:(Banqiao－)Taipei－FuXing S. Rd.－Yilan
  - 1917:(Banqiao－)Taipei－FuXing S. Rd.－Luodong
- Fengyuan Bus
  - 6609:Taipei—Fengyuan
- Hsinchu Bus
  - 9003:Taipei－Hsinchu

=== Allowance of bus platforms ===
Floor	User	Platform used	Remark
2	Ubus; Kuo-Kuang Bus; Sanchong, Hsinchu	Ubus:2, 3, 6, 10, 16; Kuo-Kuang Bus:11, 12, 13, 14, 15; Sanchong Hsinchu:8, 9	Platform1, 4 Closed; Platform 5, 7 for disembark of Kuo-Kuang Bus, Sanchong, Hsinchu
3	Ubus; How Tai	Ubus:2, 3, 11, 12, 13, 14, 15, 16; How Tai:10	Platform 1, 4, 5, 11 Closed; Platform6, 7, 8, 9 for disembarks
4	Ho Hsin; Aloha Bus; KML BUS; Fongyuan Bus	Ho Hsin:1, 2, 3, 4, 5: Aloha Bus:15, 16; KML Bus:13, 14; Fongyuan Bus:10	

=== Shopping Mall ===
- Qsquare: Operational area at 20,000 ping. Entrance is at Chengde Rd. Opened on 11 December 2009. Includes Vieshow Cinemas.

=== Business Hotel ===
- Palais de Chine

=== Residential ===
About 1,000 households provided.

=== Control Center ===
- OCC of TRTC(T9 OCC)
- Traffic OCC of Taipei City Hall

== Accidents and incidents ==
On April 19, 2021, a fire broke out at the Palais De Chine hotel and later spread to the adjacent Qsquare shopping mall. Police officers arrived at the scene and found a fire near the outer smoke exhaust duct on the 5th floor. The fire was later extinguished. All 302 people evacuated the building and survived.

== See also ==
- Linkou Bus Station
- Taipei City Hall Bus Station
- Taipei Station
- Yuanshan Bus Station
