= Qsquare =

Shopping mall in Datong, Taipei, Taiwan

- 京站時尙廣場

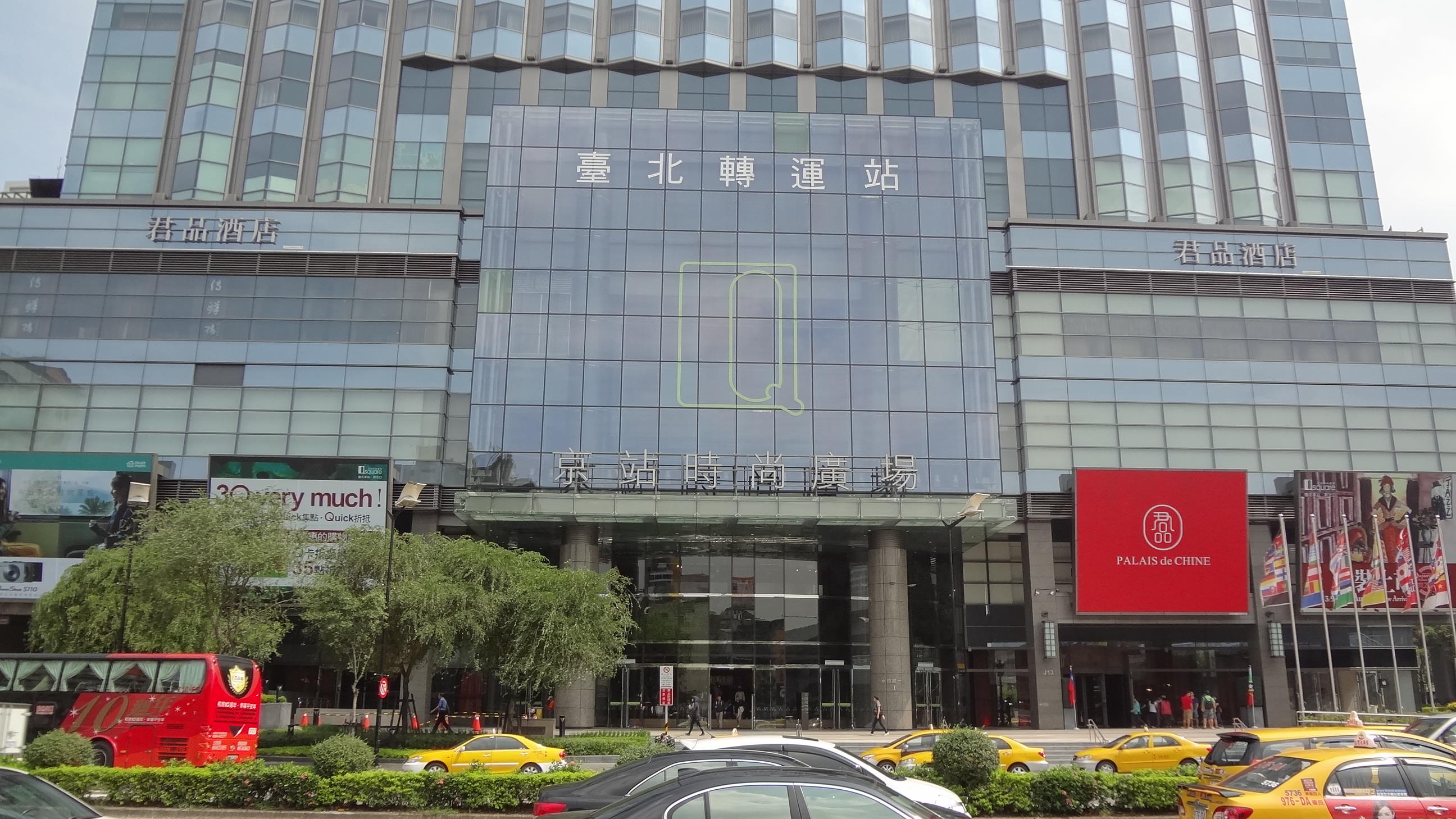
- Location: Datong, Taipei, Taiwan
- Coordinates: 25°02′57″N 121°31′02″E
- Opened: 11 December 2009
- Architect: shopping mall
- Website: Official website

Qsquare (Chinese: 京站時尙廣場; pinyin: Jīngzhàn Shíshàng Guǎngchǎng) is a shopping mall in Datong District, Taipei, Taiwan.

== History ==
The shopping mall was opened on 11 December 2009. On 19 April 2021, a fire broke out at the shopping mall and 202 visitors were evacuated.

== Transportation ==
The shopping mall is accessible within walking distance north of Taipei Main Station. The shopping mall building also houses the Taipei Bus Station.

== See also ==
- List of tourist attractions in Taiwan
