= Yuanshan Bus Station =

Bus station in Taipei, Taiwan

Coordinates: 25°4′18″N 121°31′12″E

Yuanshan Bus Station 圓山轉運站
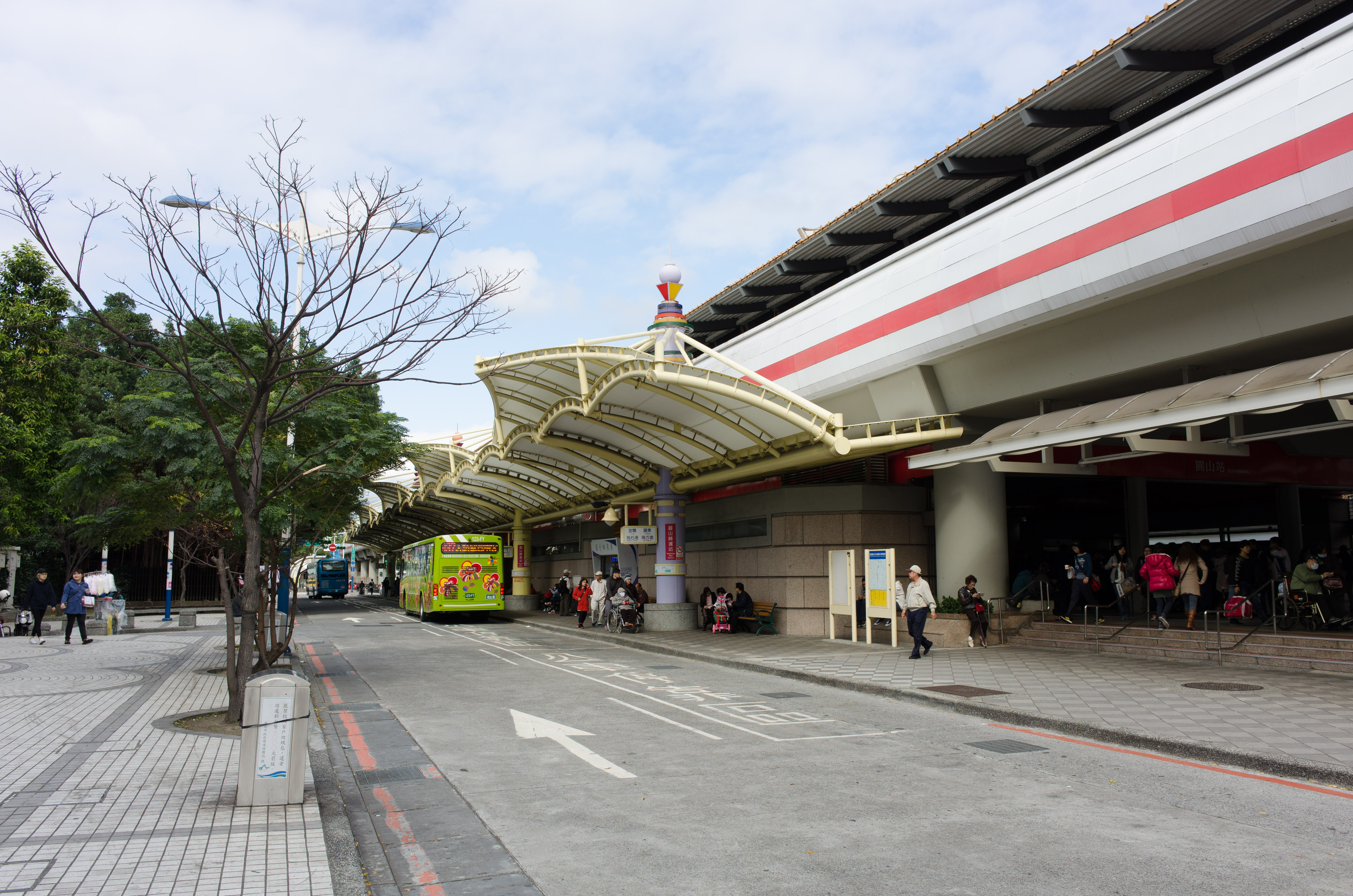
- Yuanshan Bus Station

General information
- Location: Datong, Taipei; Taiwan

History
- Opened: 9 October 2010

The Yuanshan Bus Station (Chinese: 圓山轉運站; pinyin: Yúanshān Zhuǎnyùnzhàn) is a key bus terminal in Taipei, located at the boundary between the districts of Datong and Zhongshan, adjacent to the Yuanshan metro station. It opened on 9 October 2010, as part of the transportation plan for the 2010 Taipei International Flora Exposition. Initially named Yuanshan Transport Plaza, it serves commuters using the Tamsui-Xinyi Line of the Taipei Metro and connects to city and intercity buses.

== Facilities ==
The station has two sections: one for intercity buses located on Jiuquan Street in Datong District and the other for city buses on Yumen Street in Zhongshan District, near the Taipei Expo Park.

=== Intercity bus routes ===
Yuanshan Bus Station is serviced by several bus operators, including San Chung Bus, Capital Bus, Kamalan Bus, Kuo-Kuang Motor Transport, and Taoyuan Bus. Key routes include connections to Linkou, Taoyuan, Yilan City, and Keelung, among others.

- 936:Yuanshan－Linkou
- 937:Yuanshan－Linkou
- 1356:Yuanshan－Nankan
- 1579:Taipei－Badouzi
- 1877:Yuanshan－Wushi Harbor
- 1878:Yuanshan－Yilan
- 1879:Yuanshan－Luodong
- 1881:Yuanshan－Jiaoxi
- 2022:Jiantan－Zhongli
- 9006:Yuanshan－Keelung
- 9023:Yuanshan－Taoyuan
- 0968:Yuanshan－Dazhu, Taoyuan
- 0968A:Yuanshan－Kainan University, Taoyuan

=== City Bus Routes ===
- 21:Yuanshan－Wende metro station
- 42:Yuanshan－Dazhi
- 208:Zhonghe－Dazhi
- 247:Yuanshan－Donghu
- 287:Taipei Bridge－Donghu
- 542:Yuanshan－Zhongshan Junior High School metro station
- 677:Yuanshan－Shehou, Xizhi
- R2:Yuanshan－Shehou, Xizhi

== See also ==
- Linkou Bus Station
- Songshan Bus Station
- Taipei City Hall Bus Station
- Taipei Bus Station
