= Linkou Bus Station =

Bus station in New Taipei, Taiwan

Coordinates: 25°4′2″N 121°21′41″E

Linkou Bus Station 林口轉運站
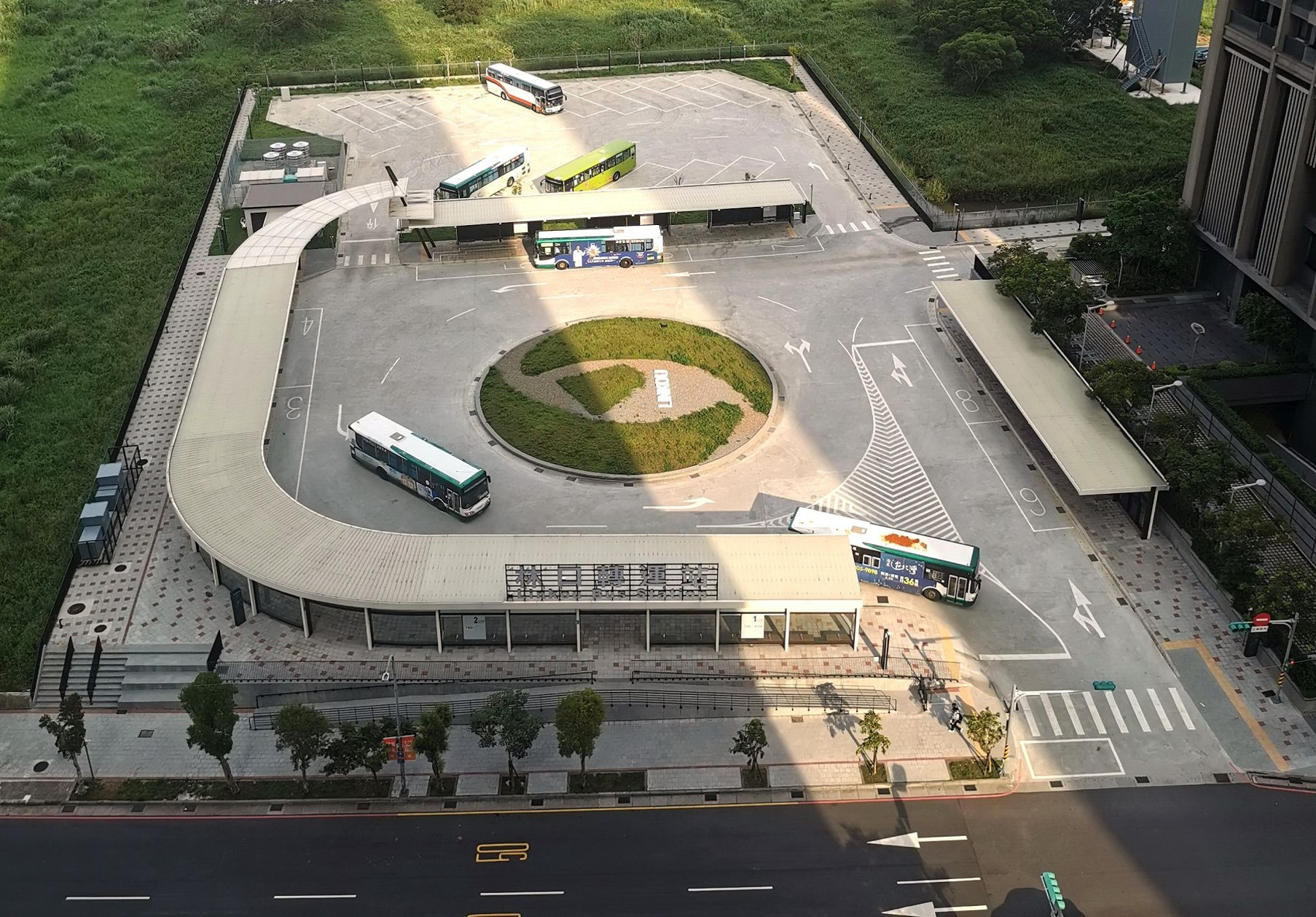
- Aerial view of Linkou Bus Station

General information
- Location: Linkou District, New Taipei; Taiwan
- Platforms: 9

History
- Opened: 15 October 2021

The Linkou Bus Station (Chinese: 林口轉運站; pinyin: Línkǒu Zhuǎnyùnzhàn) is a key bus terminal located in Linkou District, New Taipei, Taiwan. The station is adjacent to the Linkou metro station on the Taoyuan Airport MRT. Opened on 15 October 2021, the station has 9 platforms and serves commuters connecting to city and intercity buses.

== Bus Routes ==
- 708:Linkou—Hsing Wu University
- 711:Linkou—Linkou Chang Gung Memorial Hospital
- 760:Linkou Bus Station Circuit Shuttle Bus
- 786:Linkou—Xinzhuang-Banqiao
- 854:Huaya Technology Park
- 898:Linkou—Huilong metro station
- 920:Linkou—Banqiao
- 937:Linkou—Yuanshan Bus Station
- 945:Linkou—Hsing Wu University
- 946:Linkou—Hsing Wu University
- 948:Linkou
- 966:Linkou—Taipei Bus Station
- 967:Linkou—Ren'ai Dunhua Road Intersection
- F237:Linkou—Chushuikeng

== See also ==
- Taipei City Hall Bus Station
- Taipei Bus Station
- Yuanshan Bus Station
