= Taipei Main Station =

Major railway station in Taiwan

Taipei 台北·臺北
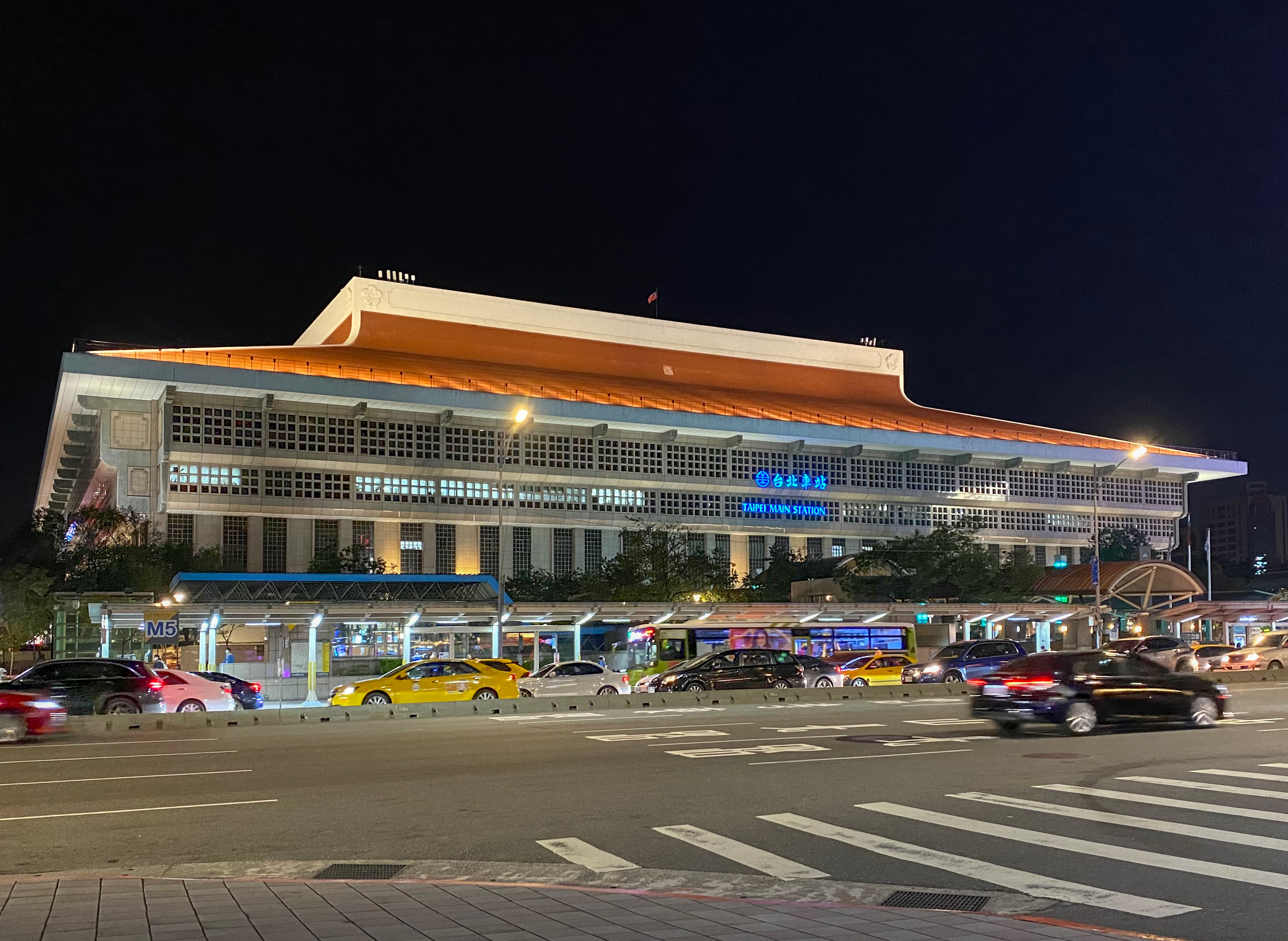
- Taipei Main Station

Chinese name
- Chinese: 台北·臺北
Transcriptions
Standard Mandarin
- Hanyu Pinyin: Táiběi
- Bopomofo: ㄊㄞˊ ㄅㄟˇ
- Wade–Giles: T'ai²-pei³
Hakka
- Romanization: Tǒi-běd (Sixian dialect); Toi-bed (Hailu dialect)
- Pha̍k-fa-sṳ: Thòi-pet
Southern Min
- Tâi-lô: Tâi-pak

General information
- Location: 3 Beiping W Rd; Zhongzheng, Taipei; Taiwan
- Coordinates: 25.0475°N 121.5170°E
- System: Taiwan High Speed Rail and Taiwan Railway station
- Distance: 6 km (THSR); 28.3 km to Keelung (TRA)
- Connections: Rapid transit; Local bus; Coach; Taoyuan Airport MRT (A1 Taipei Main Station)

Construction
- Structure type: Underground

Other information
- Station code: TPE／02 (THSR); 100 (TR three-digit); 1008 (TR four-digit); A10 (TR statistical); ㄊㄞ (TRA telegraph)
- Classification: Special class (Chinese: 特等) (TRA)
- Website: www.thsrc.com.tw/en/StationInfo/Prospect/53156954-1528-461f-af8b-54c517a435a4 (THSR); www.railway.gov.tw/taipei/ (in Chinese) (TRA)

History
- Opened: 20 October 1891
- Rebuilt: 2 September 1989
- Electrified: 9 January 1978
- Former names: Taihoku (Japanese: 臺北)

Key dates
- 25 August 1901: Rebuilt
- April 1918: Relocated
- 1941: Rebuilt
- 14 July 1985: Rebuilt
- 2 March 2007: THSR opened

Passengers
- 122,150 daily (2024)

Services
Preceding station	Taiwan High Speed Rail	Following station
Nangang Terminus	THSR	Banqiao towards Zuoying
Preceding station	Taiwan Railway	Following station
Songshan towards Keelung	Western Trunk line	Wanhua towards Pingtung
Location
- Location within Taipei Location within Taiwan

Taipei Main Station / 台北車站
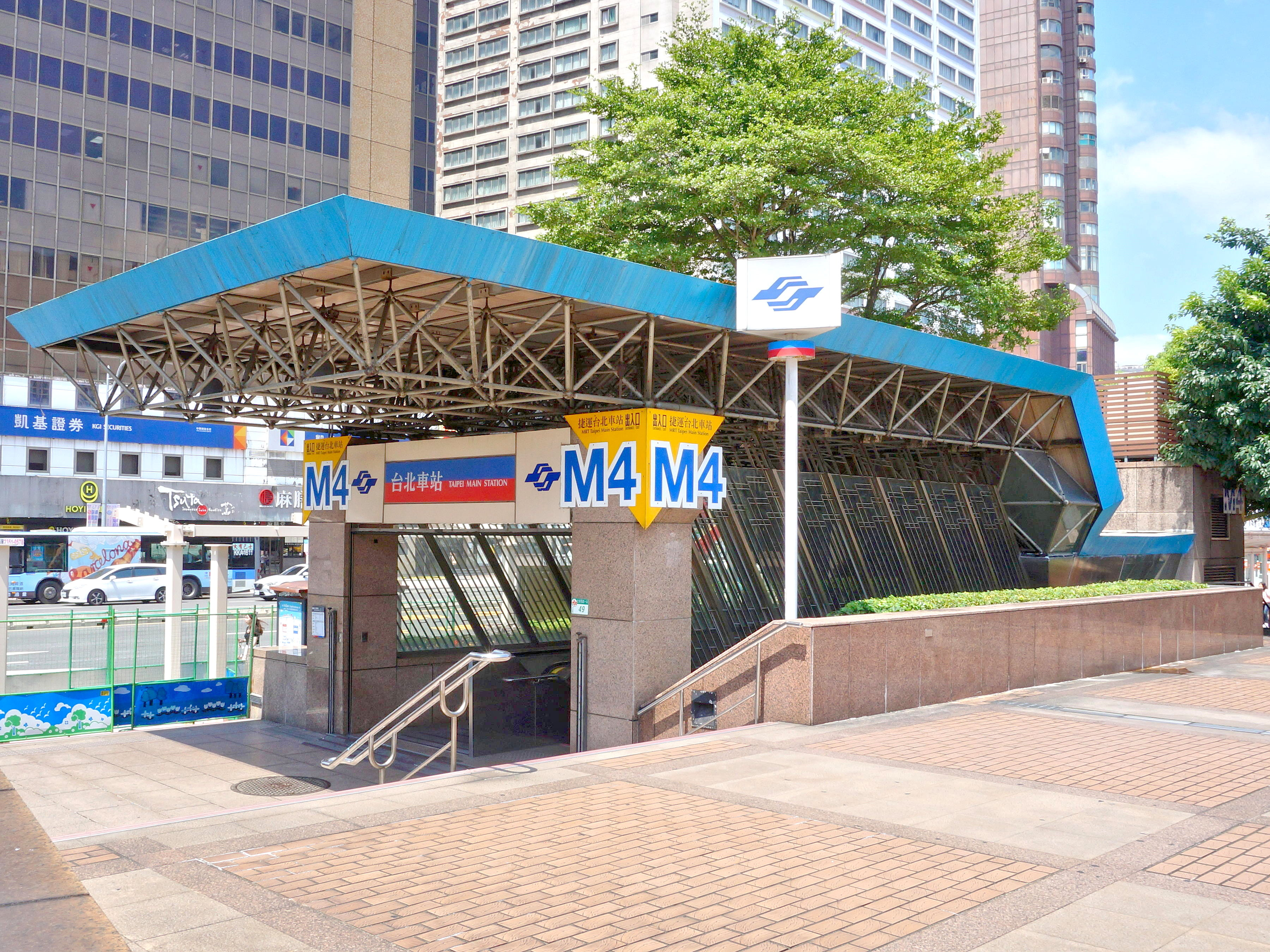
- Entrance M4

Chinese name
- Traditional Chinese: 臺北車站
- Simplified Chinese: 台北车站
Transcriptions
Standard Mandarin
- Hanyu Pinyin: Táiběi Chē Zhàn
- Bopomofo: ㄊㄞˊ ㄅㄟˇ ㄔㄜ ㄓㄢˋ
- Wade–Giles: Taipei Chechan
Hakka
- Pha̍k-fa-sṳ: Thòi-pet Chhâ-chhàm
Southern Min
- Tâi-lô: Tâi-pak Tshia-tsām

General information
- Location: 49 Sec 1 Zhongxiao W Rd; Zhongzheng District, Taipei; Taiwan
- System: Taipei Metro station

Construction
- Structure type: Underground
- Cycle facilities: No access

Other information
- Station code: ,
- Website: web.metro.taipei/e/stationdetail2010.asp?ID=BL12+R10-051

History
- Opened: 25 December 1997

Key dates
- 24 December 1999: Bannan line opened

Passengers
- 2016: 322,380 daily (December 2024) ▲0.02%
- Rank: (Ranked 1 of 119)

Services
Preceding station	Taipei Metro	Following station
NTU Hospital towards Xiangshan or Daan	Tamsui–Xinyi line	Zhongshan towards Tamsui or Beitou
Ximen towards Dingpu	Bannan line	Shandao Temple towards Nangang Exhib Center
Location

Taipei Main Station (Chinese: 台北車站; pinyin: Táiběi chēzhàn) is a major railway and metro station in Taipei, Taiwan. It is served by Taiwan Railway, Taiwan High Speed Rail, and Taipei Metro. It is also connected through underground passageways to the terminal station of Taoyuan Airport MRT and the Taipei Bus Station. It is the busiest transport hub in Taiwan.

== Station overview ==
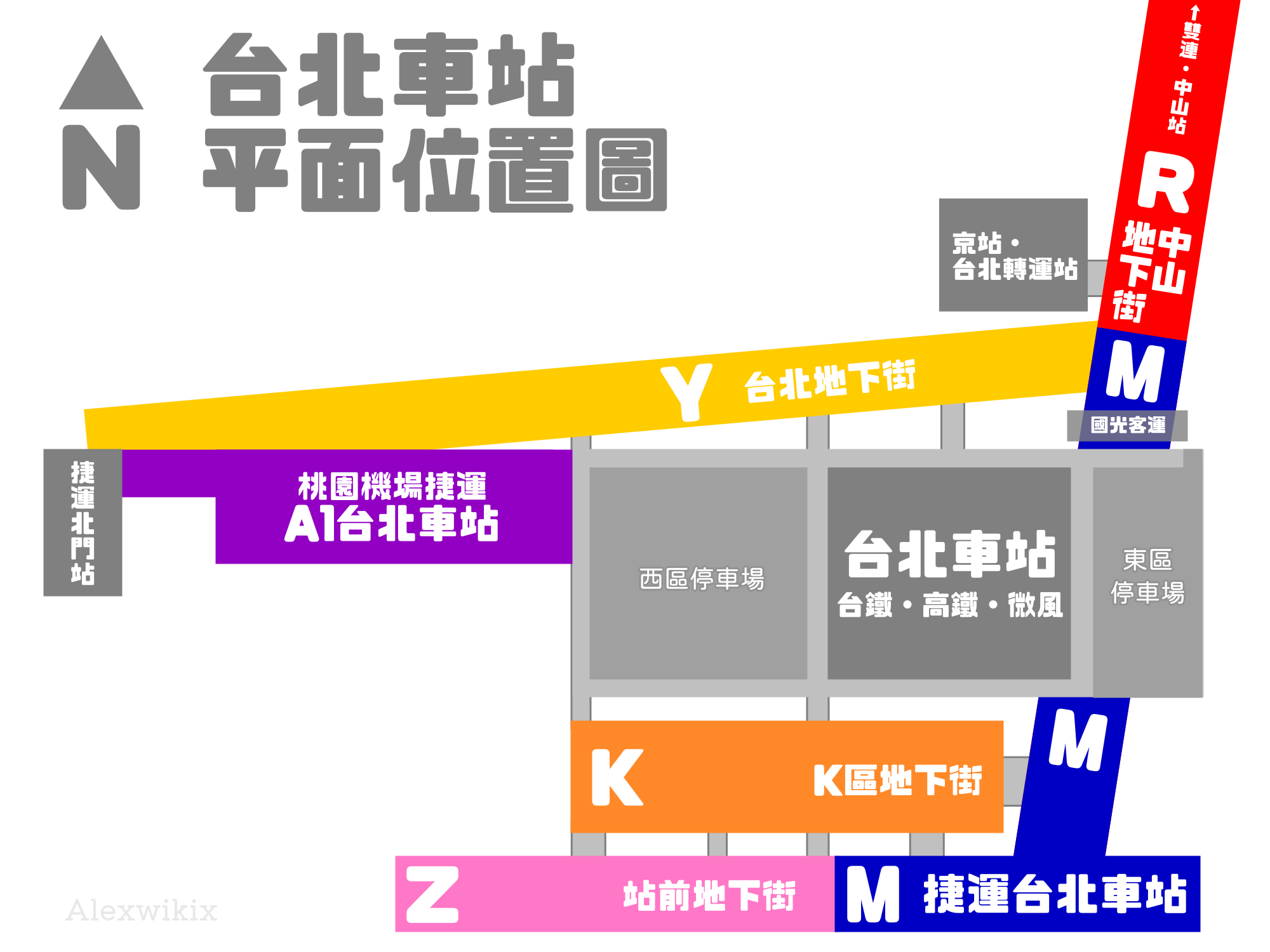
Layout of Taipei station in 2021, including the Taoyuan Airport MRT station and Beimen Railway station Taipei Metro Taoyuan Airport MRT Zhongshan Metro Mall Taipei City Mall Shopping plaza Station Front Metro Mall

The central building of Taipei Main Station is a rectangular building in Zhongzheng District with six stories above ground and four stories below ground. The building is 149 m (488 ft 10 in) long and 110 m (360 ft 11 in) wide. The first floor has a large ticketing hall with a skylight and three ground-level exits in each cardinal direction, the second is occupied by restaurants managed by the Breeze group, and all floors above are office spaces. At the B1 level, there are turnstiles for the TR and THSR platforms, along with a myriad of underground passageways for Taipei Bus Station, the Taoyuan Metro station, and Beimen metro station. Zhongshan Metro Mall, Taipei City Mall, Station Front Metro Mall, and Qsquare all connect on this level as well. TRA and THSR each have two island platforms at the B2 level. As for Taipei Metro, the Bannan line's platforms are located at the south of the station building; the entrances are at the B2 level, and the platforms are at B3. The Tamsui-Xinyi line's entrance is directly under the station building at B3, and the platforms are at B4.

== Station layout ==
6F ｜ 3F	Taiwan Railways Administration offices	Taiwan Railway, Scheduling Control Center; TR employee rooms YMCA, other private companies (rented); TRA Auditorium
2F	Retail level	Taipei Station Breeze Center, food court (elevator at East Entrance 2)
2F	Retail level	Restrooms
L1	Street level	Entrance/exit; TRA/THSR ticketing, automatic ticket machines, tourism counter TRA information office, TRA station manager office, railway police TRA information desk, THSR police, THSR military police
L1	Street level	TRA entrance/exit, guard
L1	TRA Luggage Office	TRA Parcel Center (separate structure)
L1	THSR Administration	offices
B1	Concourse	THSR ticketing, TRA/THSR automatic ticketing, ticket gates, waiting area Restrooms
B1	Concourse	Car park, military transportation service
B1	Concourse	Connects to B1 of the Taipei Metro
B1	Underground passageway	Zhongshan Metro Mall, Taipei Underground Market, Eslite Taipei Station, restrooms
B1	Underground passageway	Connects to B1 of TRA/THSR, Taipei Bus Station
B2	Metro Lobby	Information desk, faregates, restrooms (inside fare area); Red line, Blue line transfer area, escalators to platforms
B2	Metro offices (separate structure)	Metro Control Center briefing rooms
2A	TRA Control level	TRA Traffic Room, Central Station Monitoring Center
2B	Platform 1A	THSR towards Zuoying (Banqiao)
2B	Island platform
2B	Platform 1B	THSR towards Zuoying (Banqiao)
2B	Platform 2A	THSR towards Nangang (Terminus)
2B	Island platform
2B	Platform 2B	THSR towards Nangang (Terminus)
2B	Fifth track	West Coast line does not stop here
2B	Platform 3A	West Coast line towards Taichung, Kaohsiung (Wanhua)
2B	Island platform
2B	Platform 3B	West Coast line towards Shulin (Wanhua)
2B	Platform 4A	West Coast line towards Keelung (Songshan)
2B	Island platform
2B	Platform 4B	West Coast line towards Yilan, Hualien, Taitung (Songshan)
2B	TRA offices level	Staff training classroom
2C	Machinery level	Machinery
B3	Concourse (transfer to Metro; TRA Entrance)	TRA/THSR ticketing, automatic ticket machines, ticket gates Escalator to B2 – TRA/THSR platforms
B3	Concourse (transfer to Metro; TRA Entrance)	Metro faregates, information desk, lost and found, gallery Restrooms (inside and outside fare zone), automatic ticket dispensing machines One-way faregates
B3	Platform 3	← Bannan line towards Nangang Exhib Center / Kunyang (BL13 Shandao Temple)
B3	Island platform, doors open on the left
B3	Platform 4	Bannan line towards Dingpu / Far Eastern Hospital (BL11 Ximen) →
B3	Control Center (separate structure)	High-Capacity Traffic Control Center (another traffic center exists)
B4	Platform 1	← Tamsui–Xinyi line towards Tamsui / Beitou (R11 Zhongshan)
B4	Island platform, doors open on the left
B4	Platform 2	Tamsui–Xinyi line towards Xiangshan / Daan (R09 NTU Hospital) →

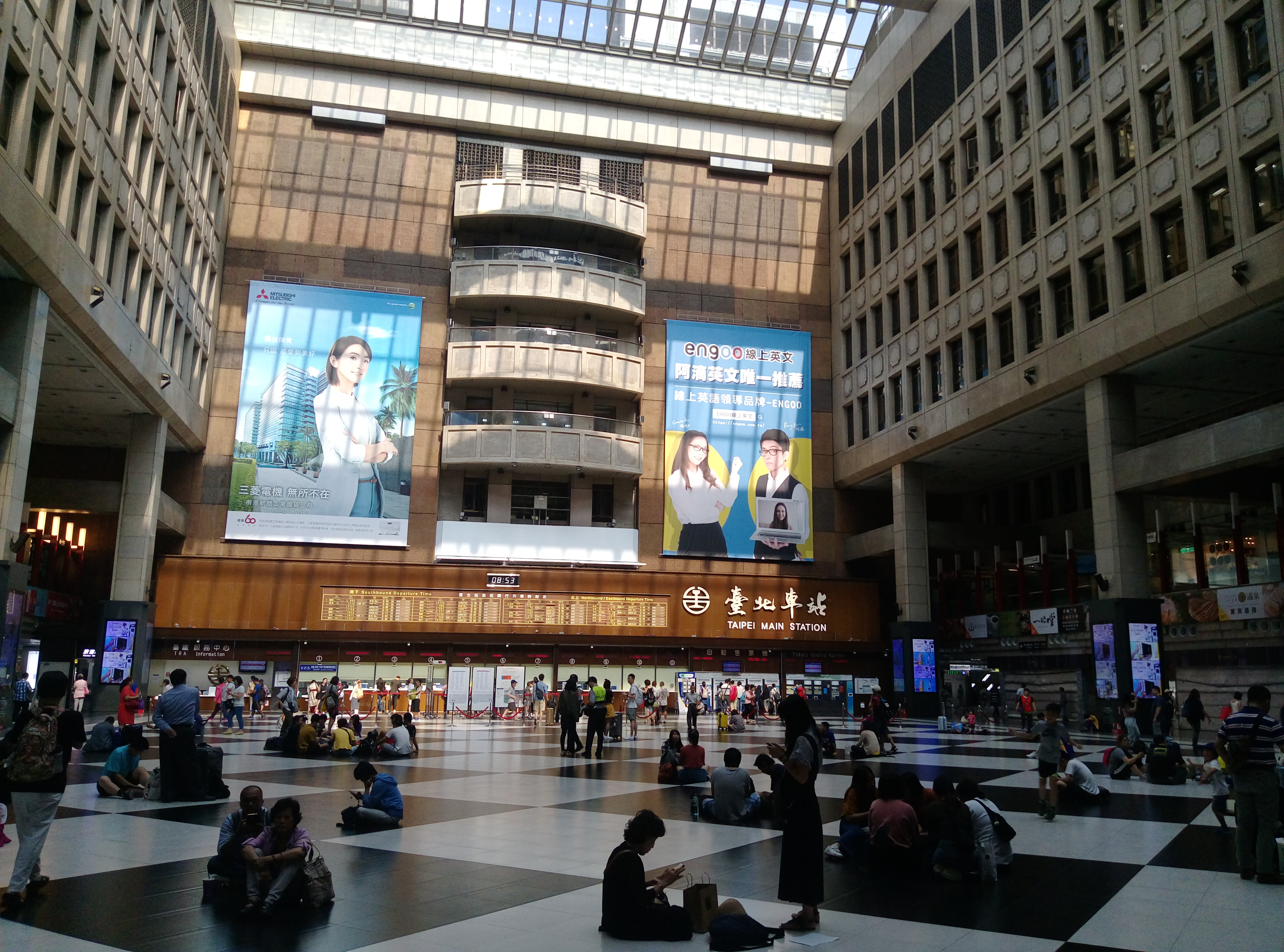
Lobby of Taipei station, August 2018

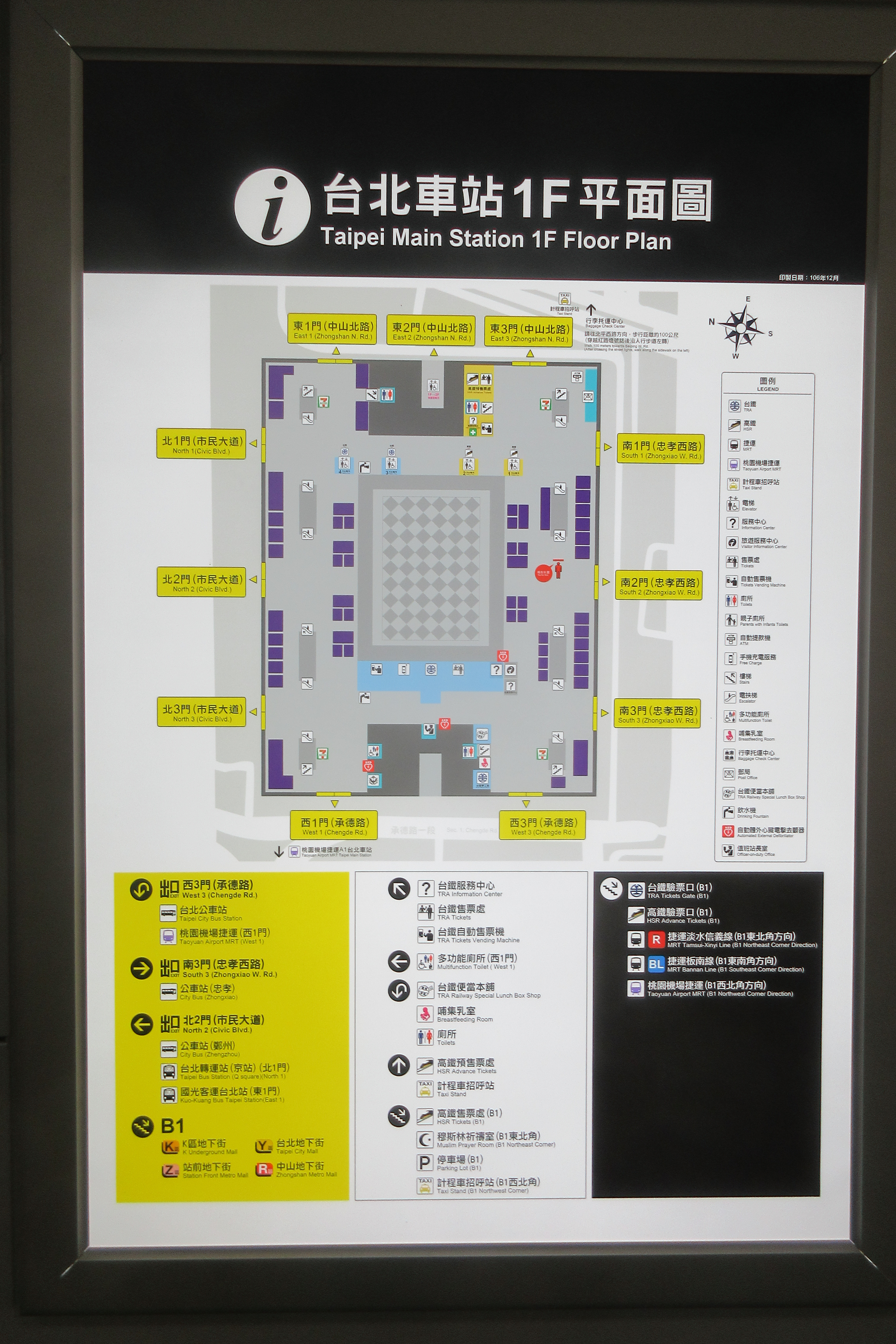
Floor plan of the first floor of Taipei station, August 2019

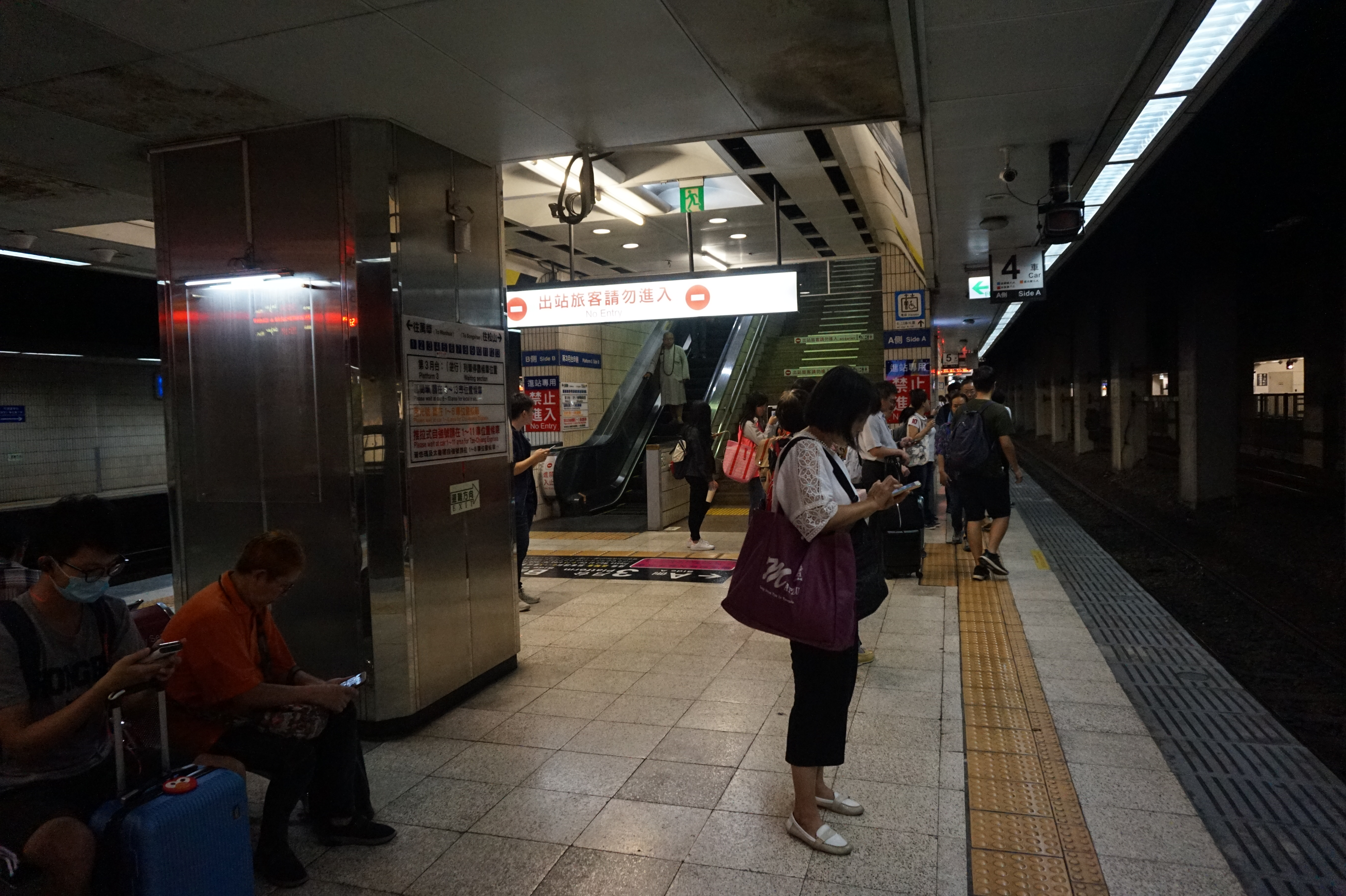
TRA platform 3A, October 2018

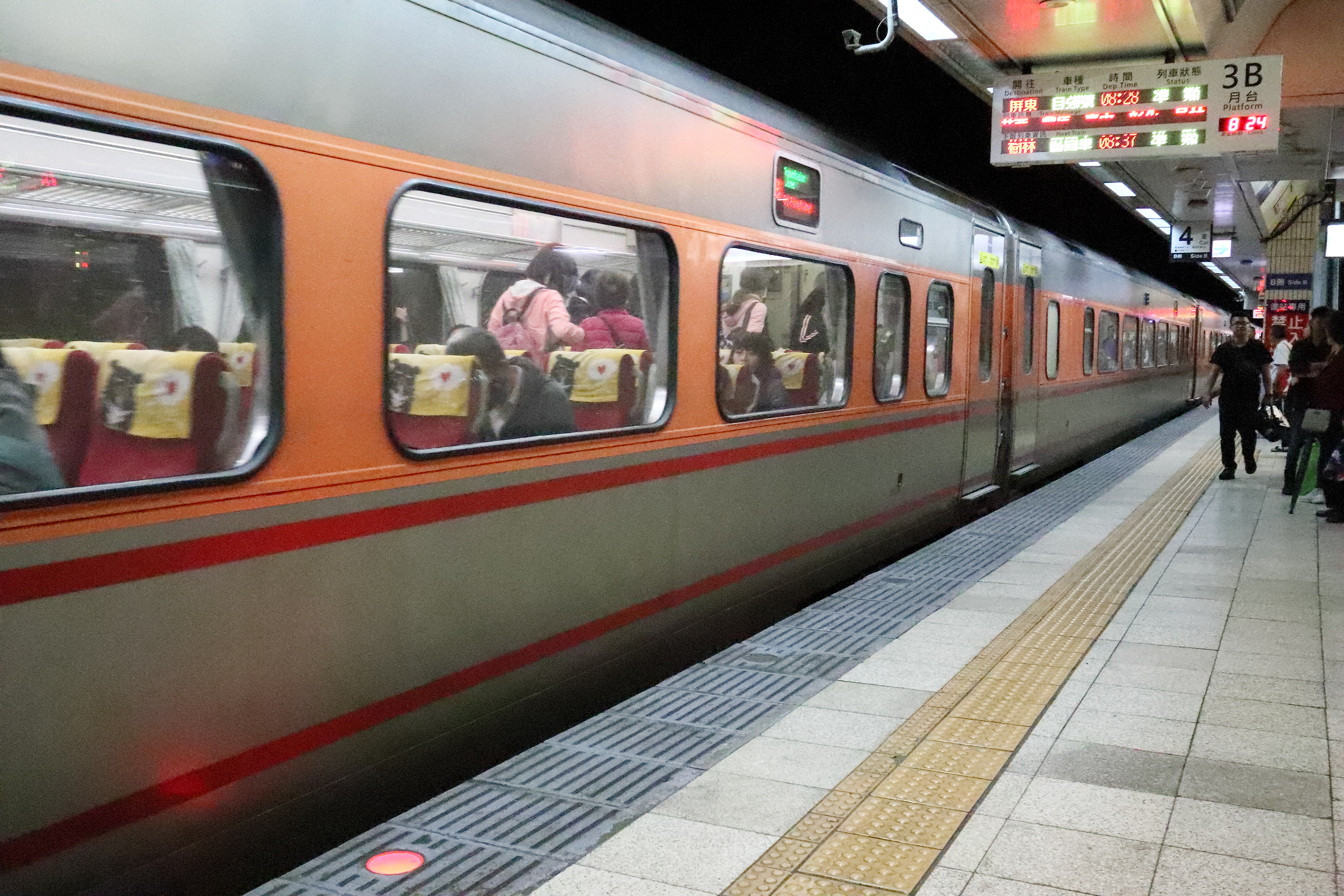
TRA platform 3B, May 2019

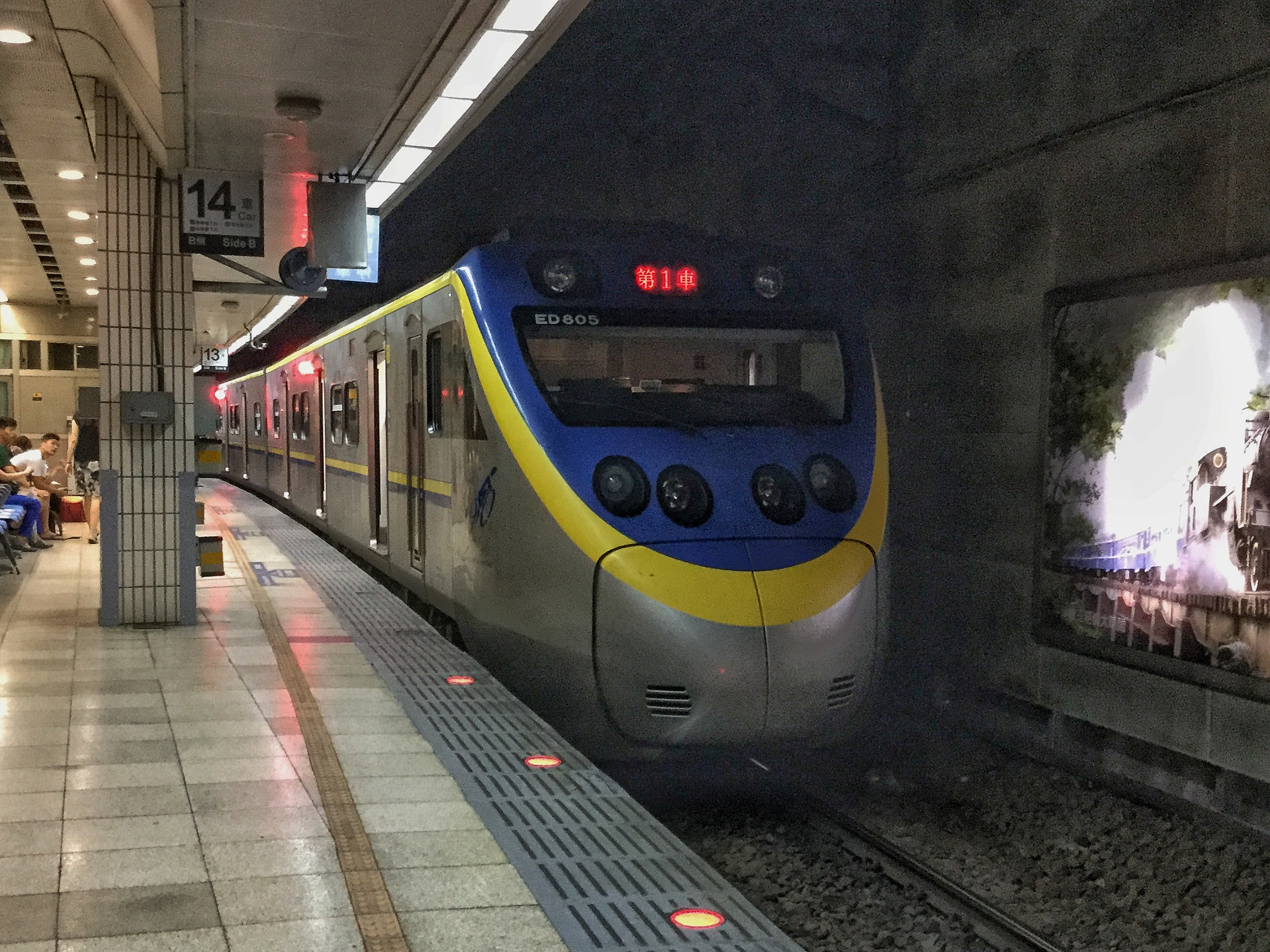
TRA platform 4B, August 2015

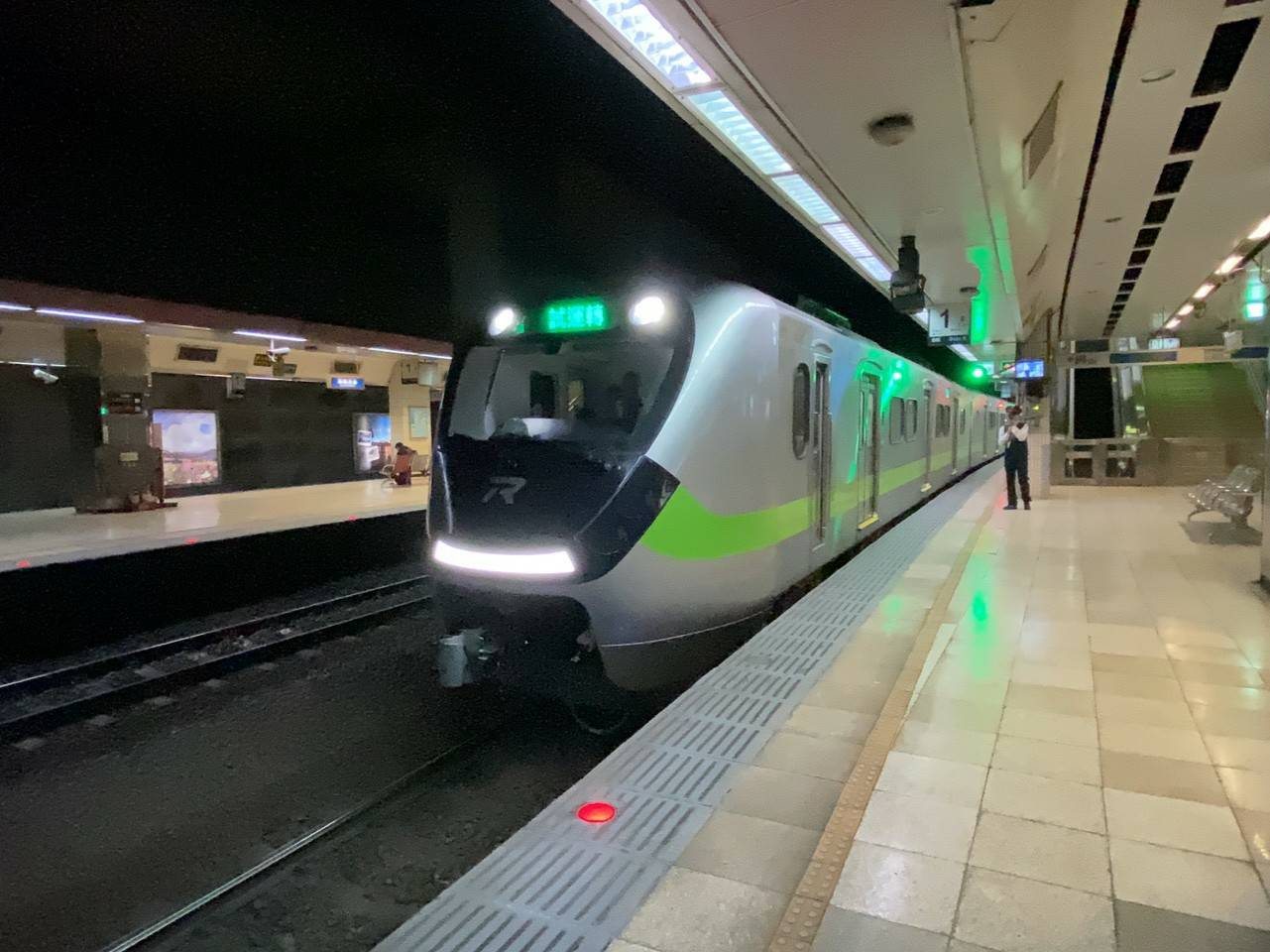
A TRA EMU900 series train undergoing a test run at Taipei station, November 2020

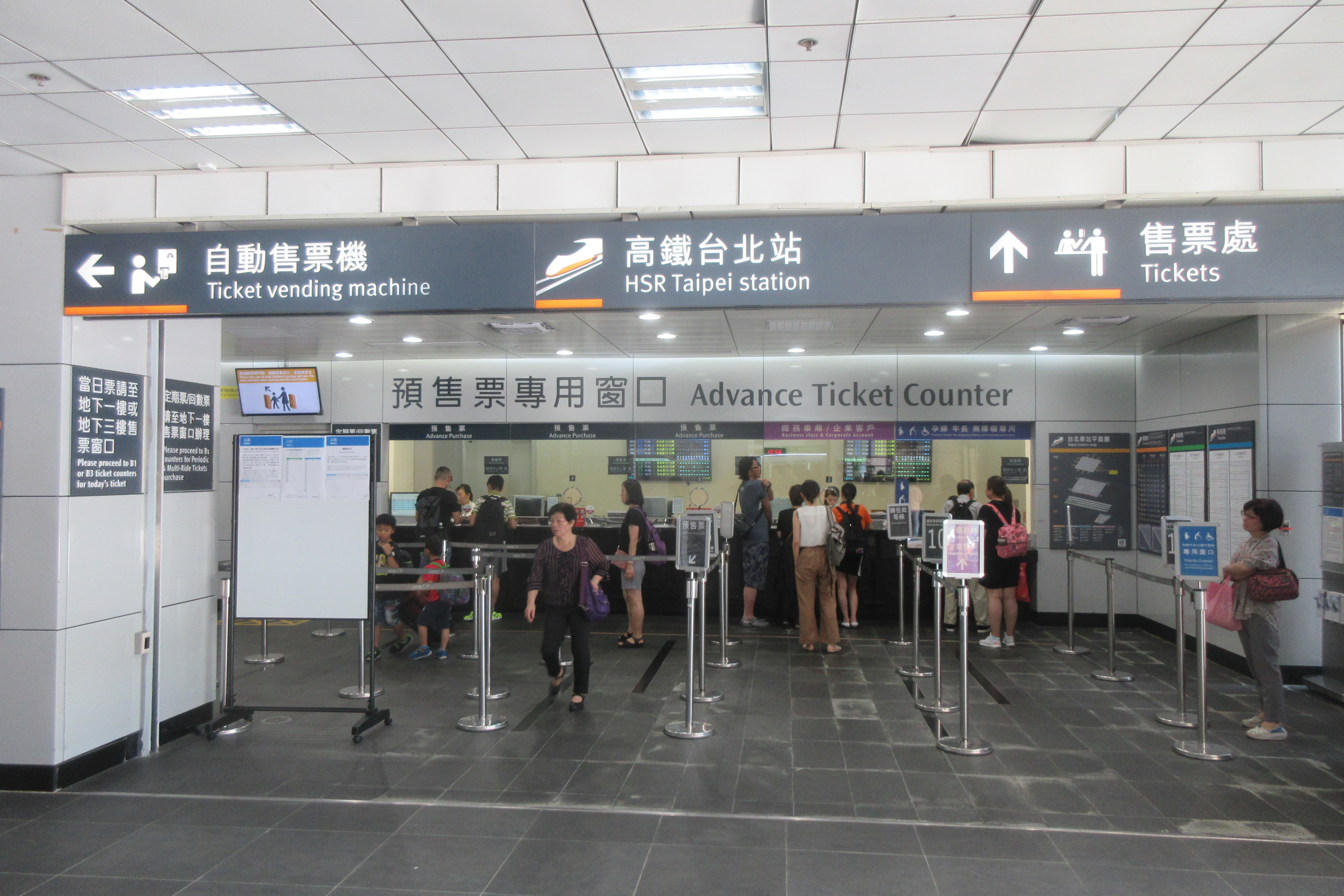
THSR ticketing counters, August 2019

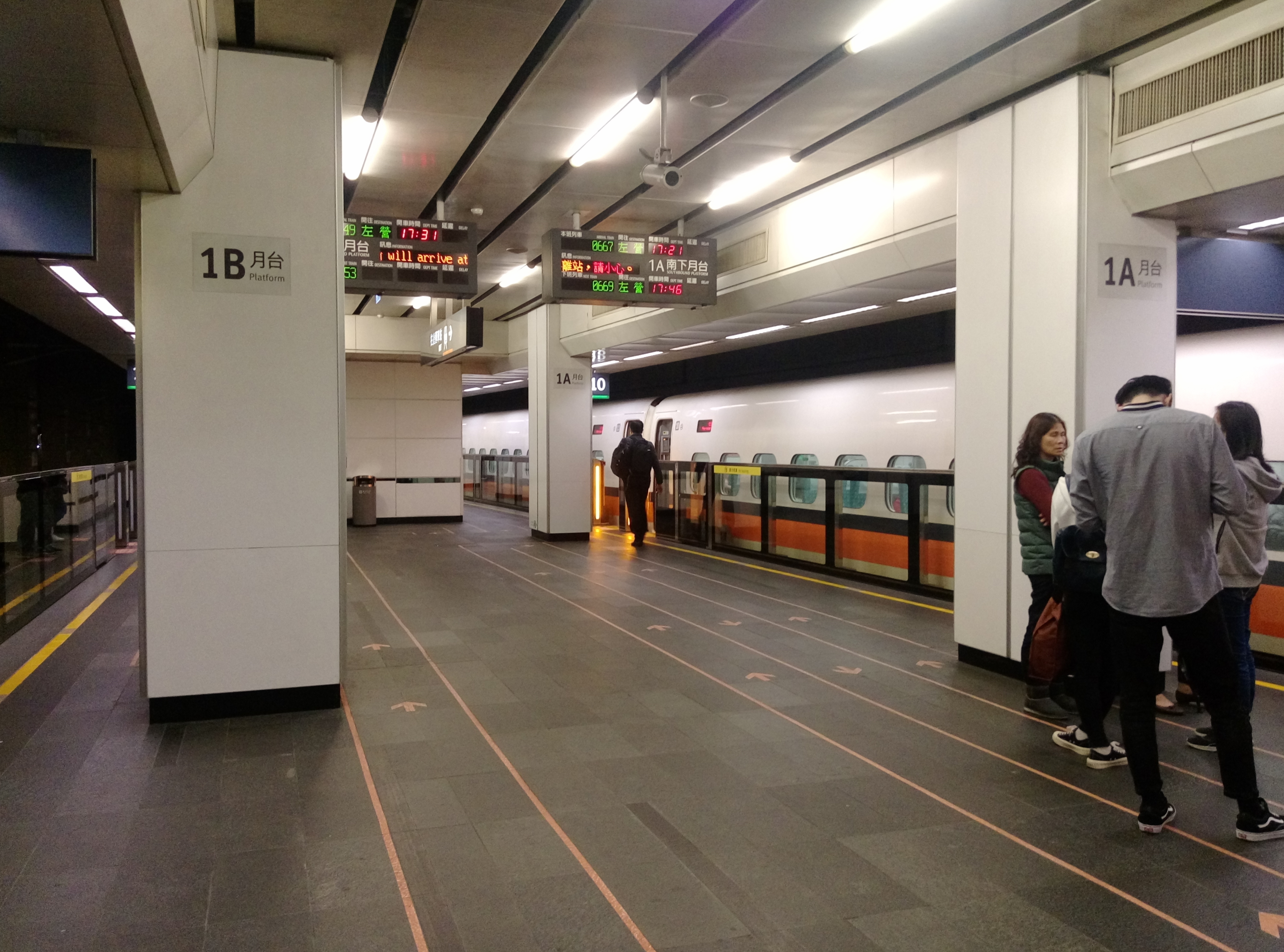
THSR platforms, February 2018

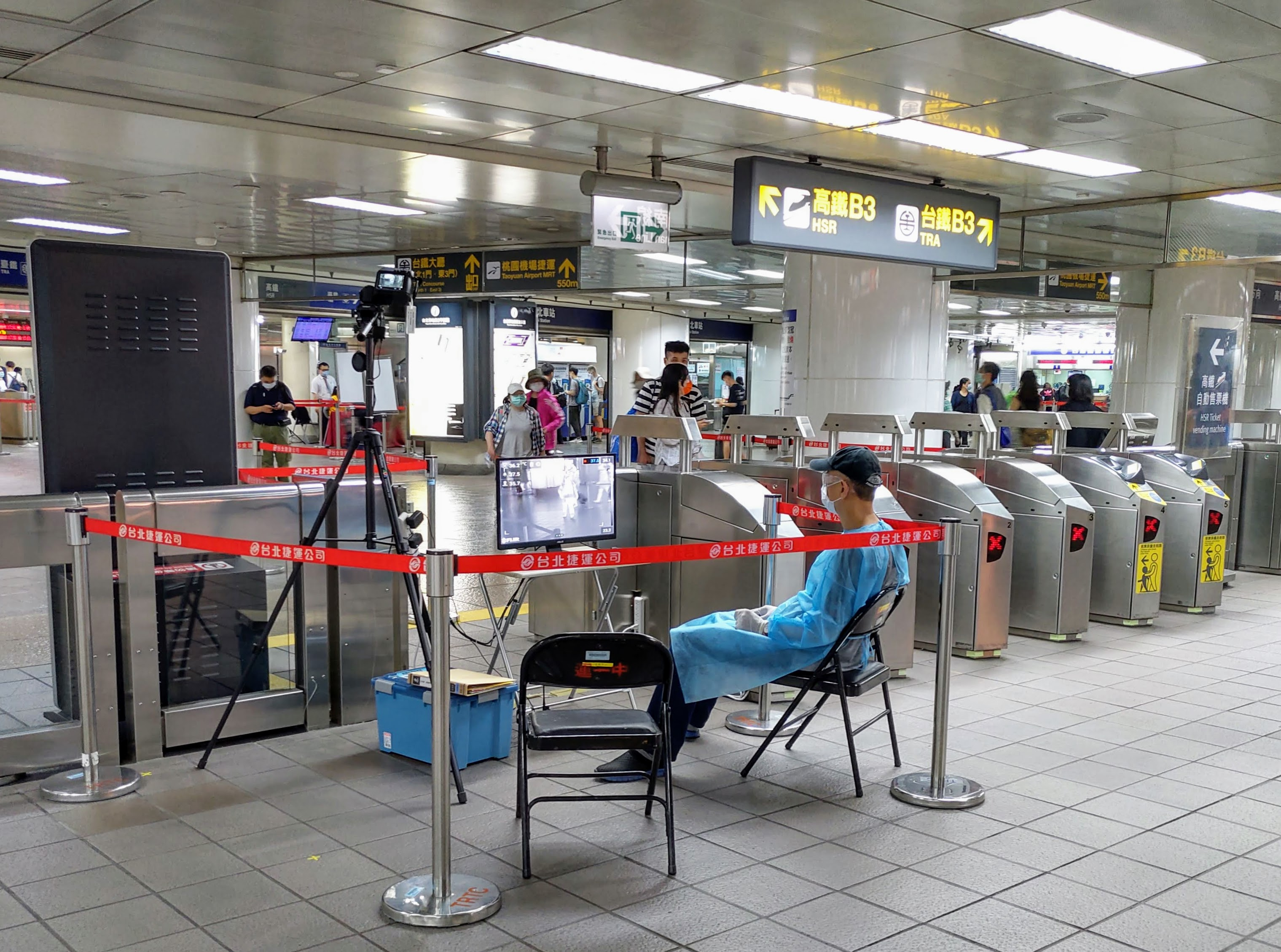
Taipei Metro Tamsui-Xinyi Line concourse, April 2020

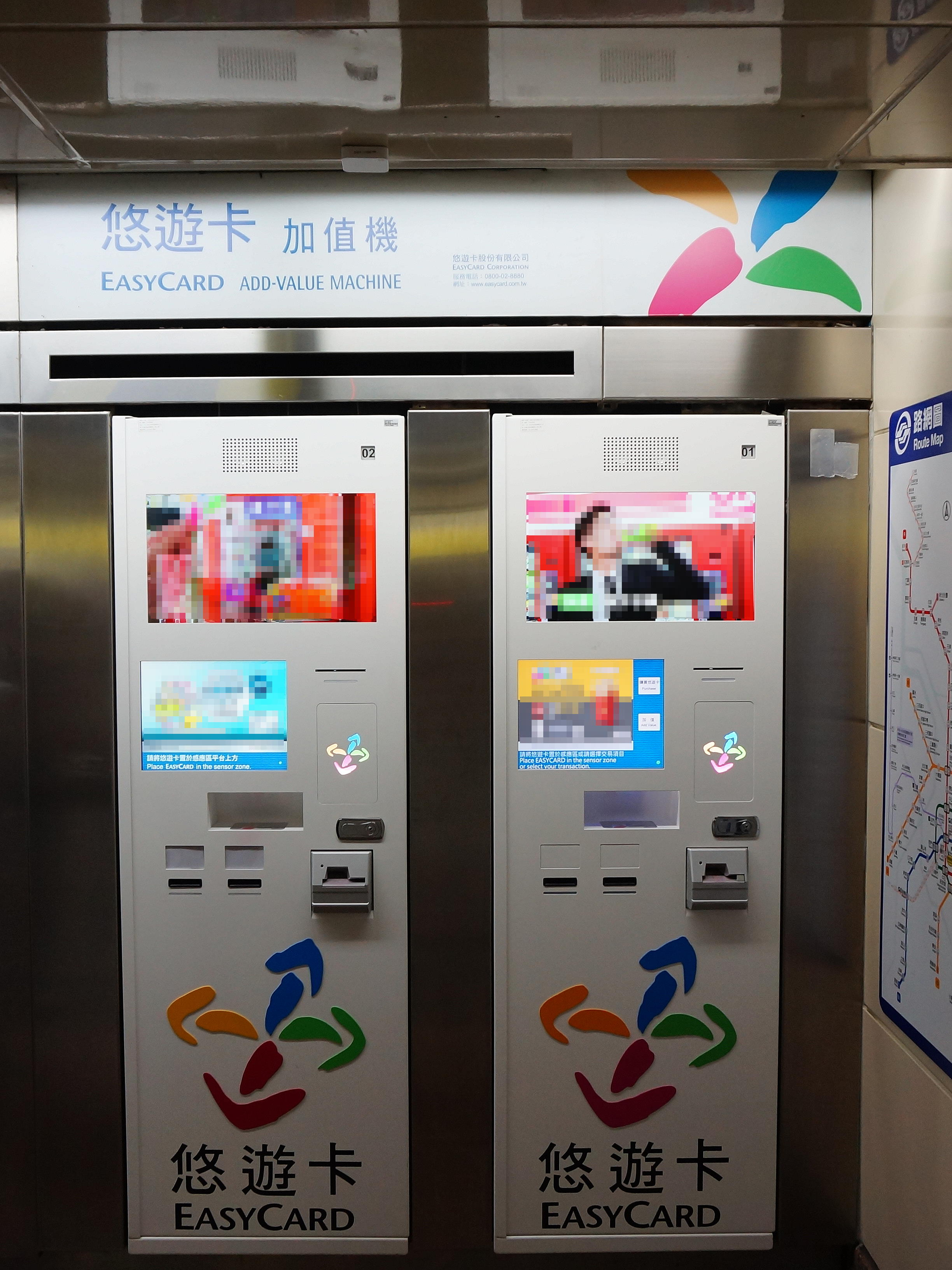
EasyCard top-up machines at the Taipei Metro concourse

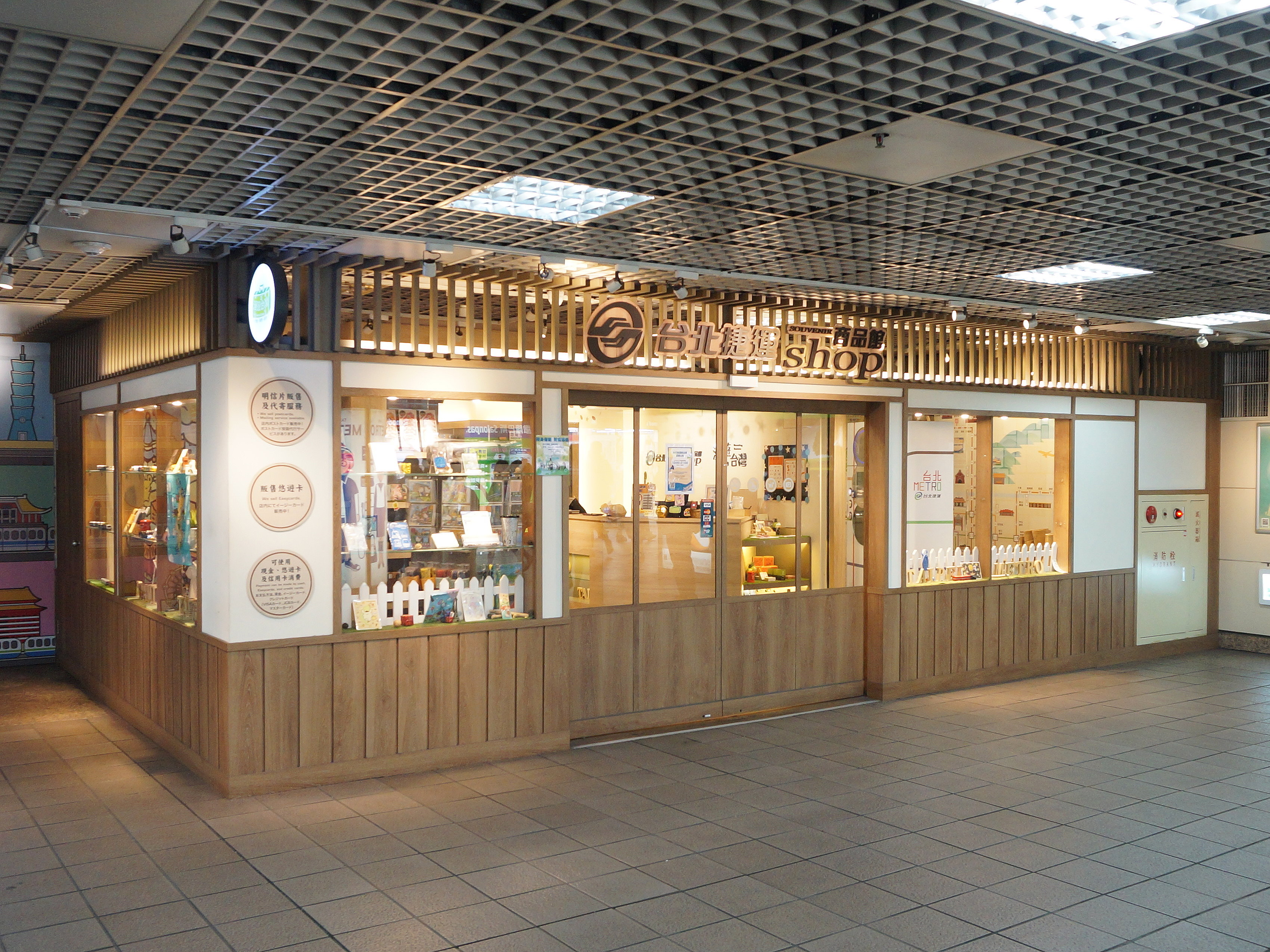
A Taipei Metro sourvenir shop at Taipei Main Station, 2020

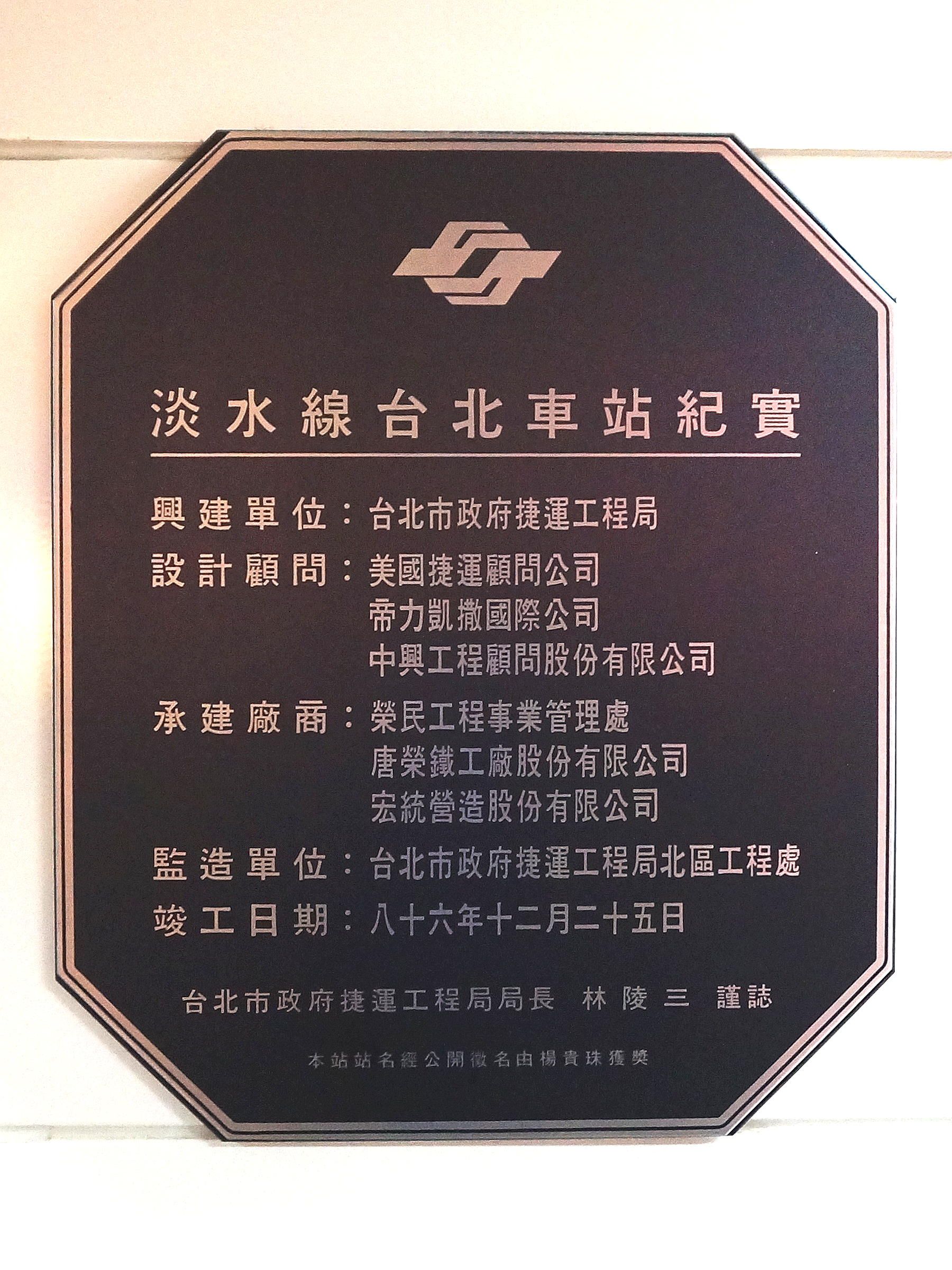
Inauguration plaque of the Taipei Metro at Taipei Main Station

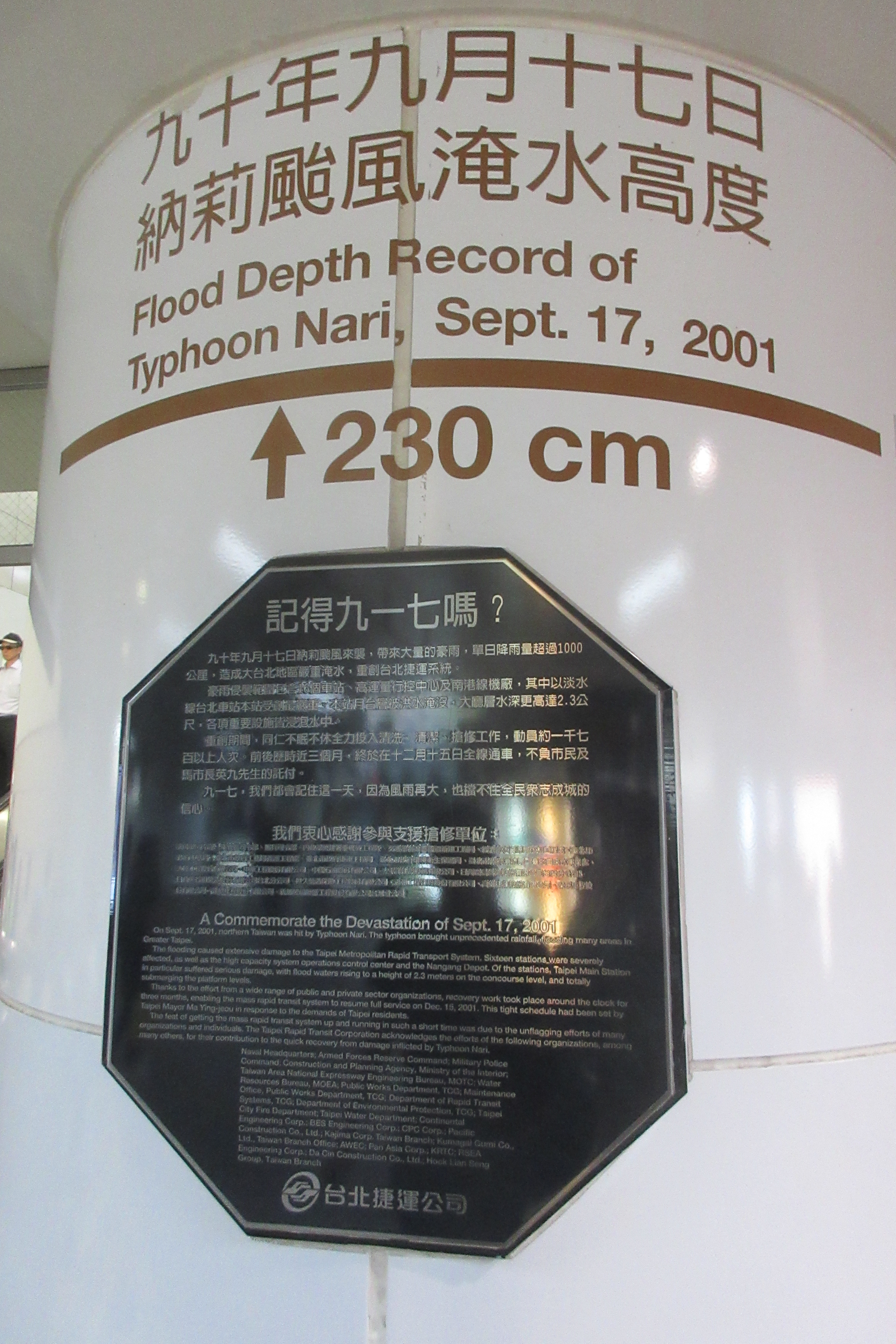
A memorial plaque with a demarcation of the record flood levels of Typhoon Nari on Taipei Main Station

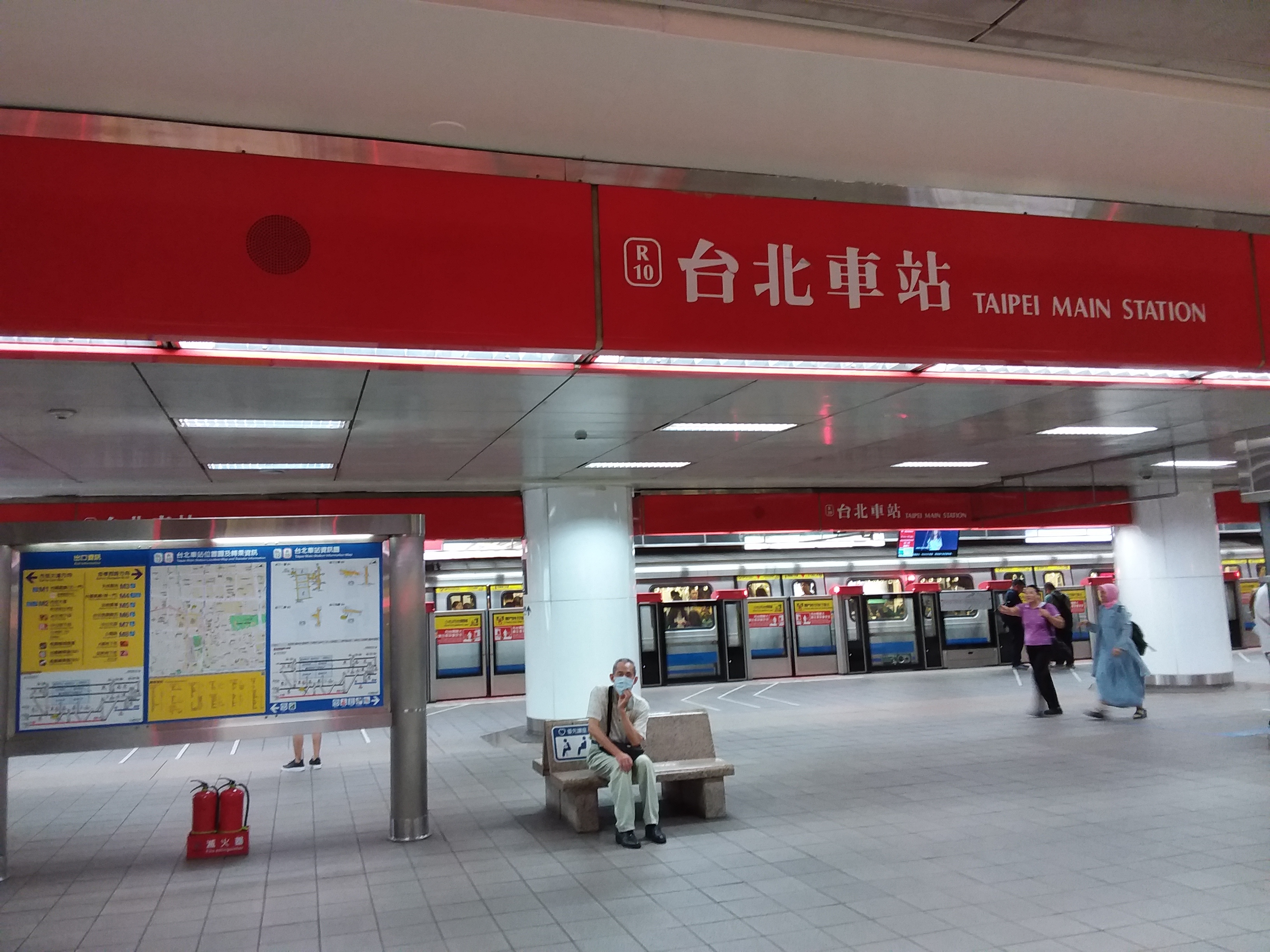
Taipei Metro Tamsui-Xinyi Line platforms, August 2019

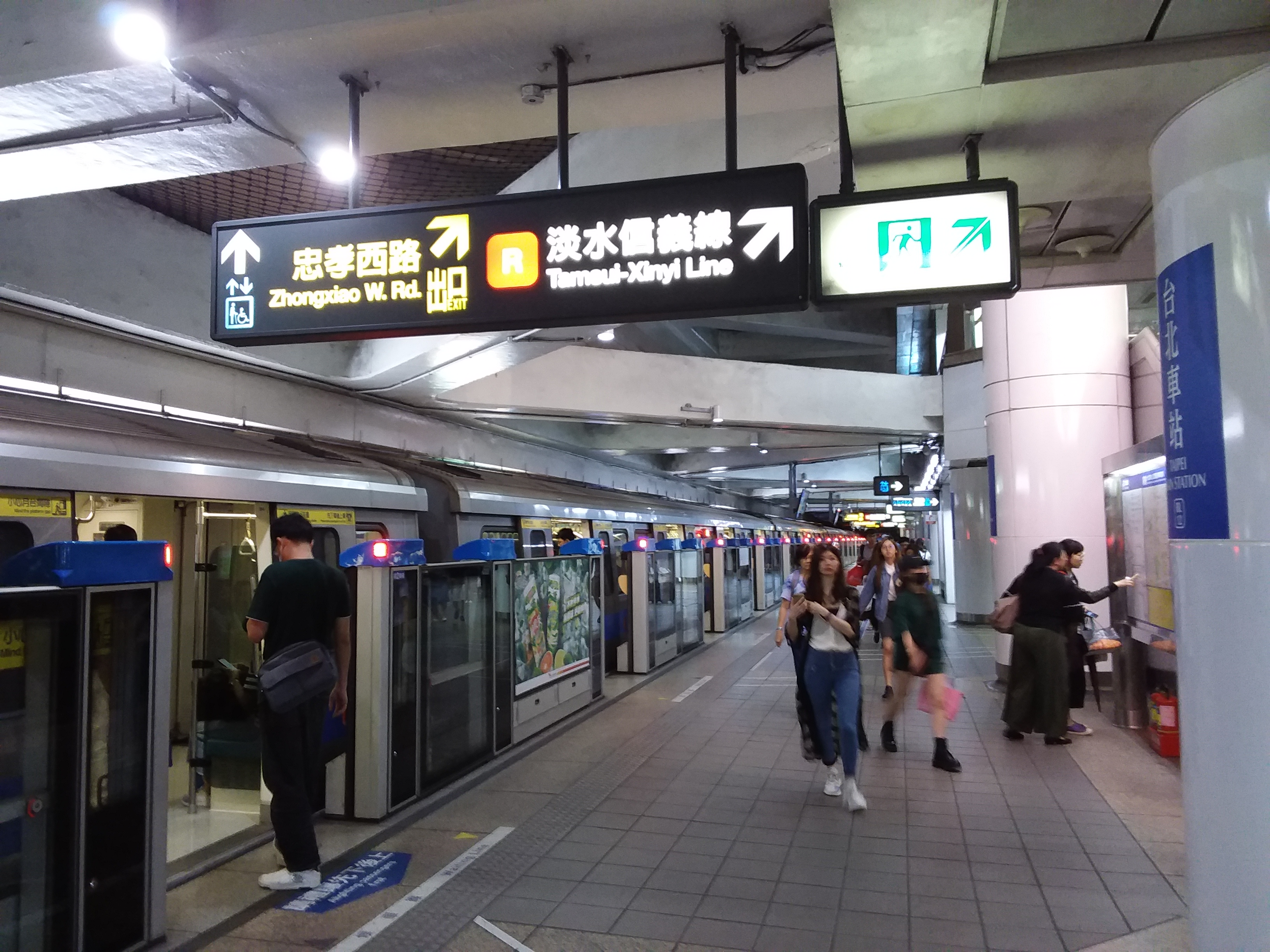
Taipei Metro Bannan Line platforms, August 2019

== HSR services ==
Except for Service 583 and 598, all HSR services call at this station. The first two southbound trains in the day are 803 (stops at all stations) at 06:26 and 203 (Taipei-Banqiao-Taichung-Chiayi-Tainan-Zuoying) at 06:30. Service 203 is the only southbound train of the day that departs from Taipei Station instead of Nangang station. Although Service 203 departs four minutes after Service 803, passengers traveling to major cities such as Taichung, Tainan, and Kaohsiung will save time taking Train No. 203, while Service 803 is more suitable for those traveling to nearby cities such as Taoyuan or Hsinchu.

== Around the station ==
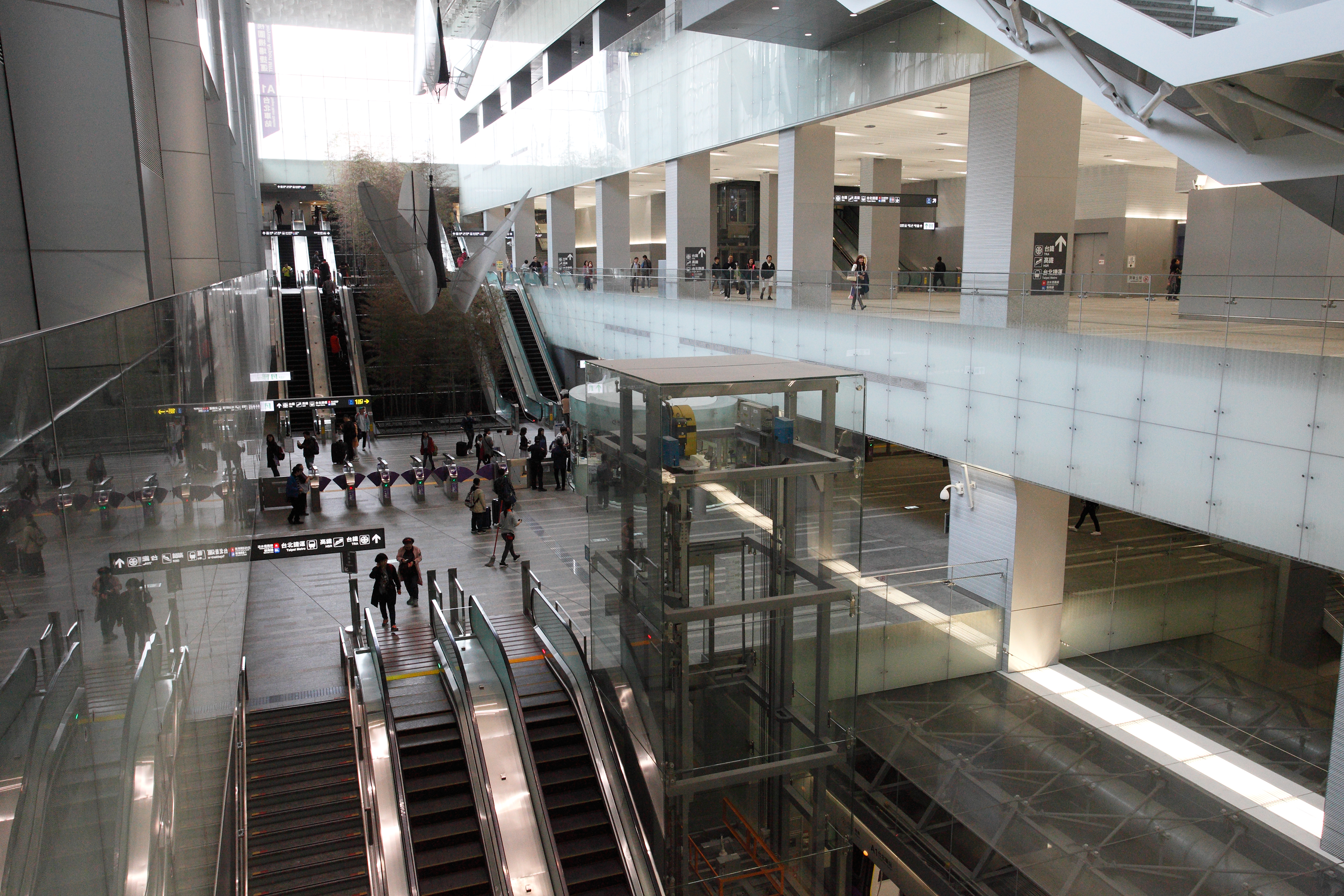
Taipei Main Station of the Taoyuan Airport MRT is connected to Taipei station via underground passageways.

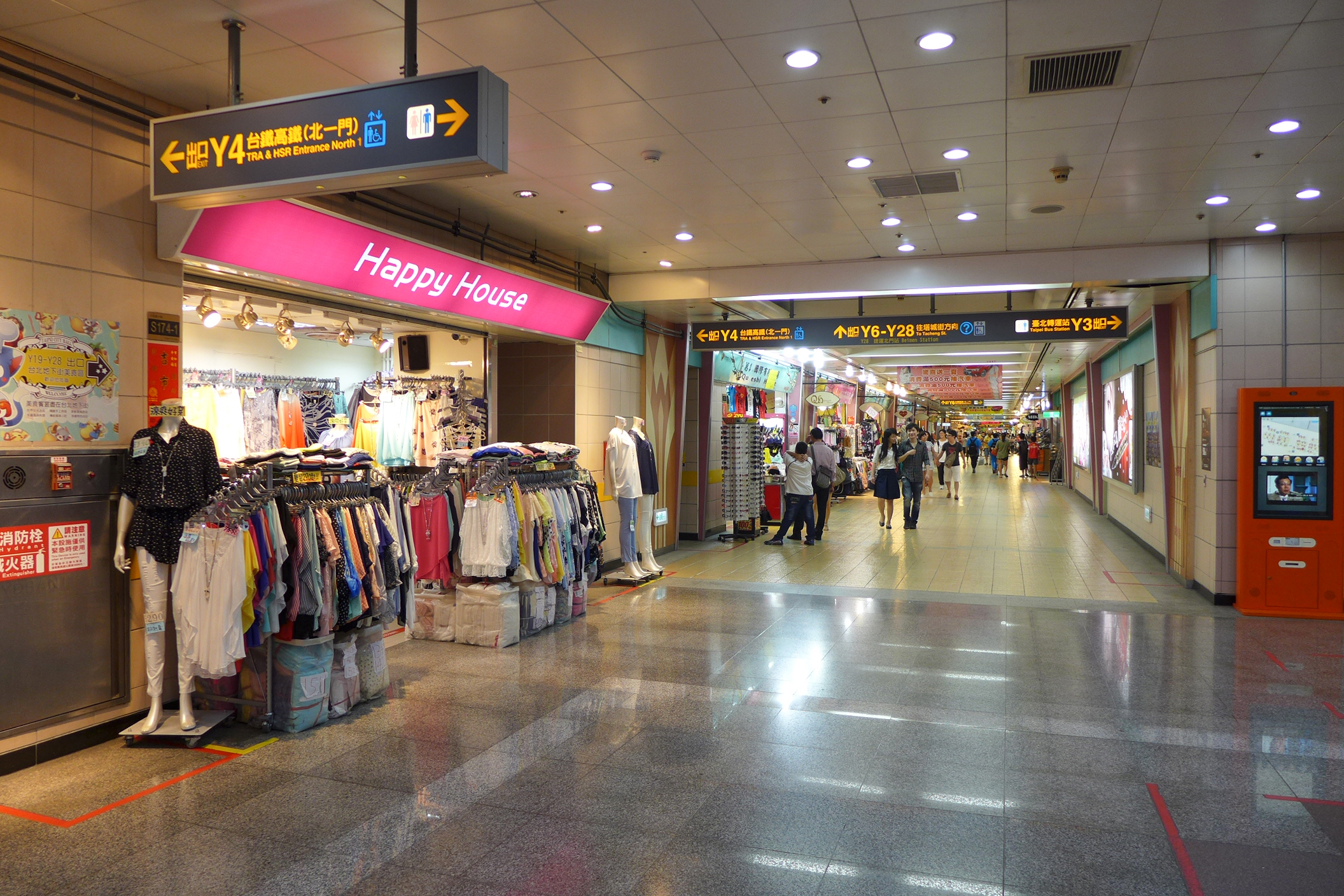
Taipei City Mall

=== (K) K Underground Mall ===
- Exit M1/Y2: TRA / THSR (Entrance North 1)
- Exit M2: Civic Blvd Expressway
- Exit M3: Cosmos Hotel Taipei / Talk Club Taiwan (美立達留學遊學中心)
- Exit M4: TRA / THSR (Entrance South 1)
- Exit M5: Station Front Plaza
- Exit M6: Caesar Park Taipei, National Taiwan Museum
- Exit M7: Zhongshan N. Rd.
- Exit M8: Gongyuan Rd, YMCA Taipei

=== (M) Zhongshan Metro Mall ===
- Taipei Bus Station
- Qsquare
- Museum of Contemporary Art Taipei
- Zhongshan Station, Shuanglian station)

=== (Y) Taipei City Mall ===
- Palais de Chine Hotel
- Taipei Station Wholesale Market
- Beimen
- Taipei Main Station (A1), Taoyuan International Airport MRT

=== (Z) Station Front Metro Mall ===
- Taipei West Bus Station Terminal A
- Shin Kong Mitsukoshi Department Store
- Guanqian Rd, Land Bank, Taiwan Cooperative Bank
- Chongqing S. Rd, First Bank
- North Gate
- Taipei Post Office of Chunghwa Post

== History ==
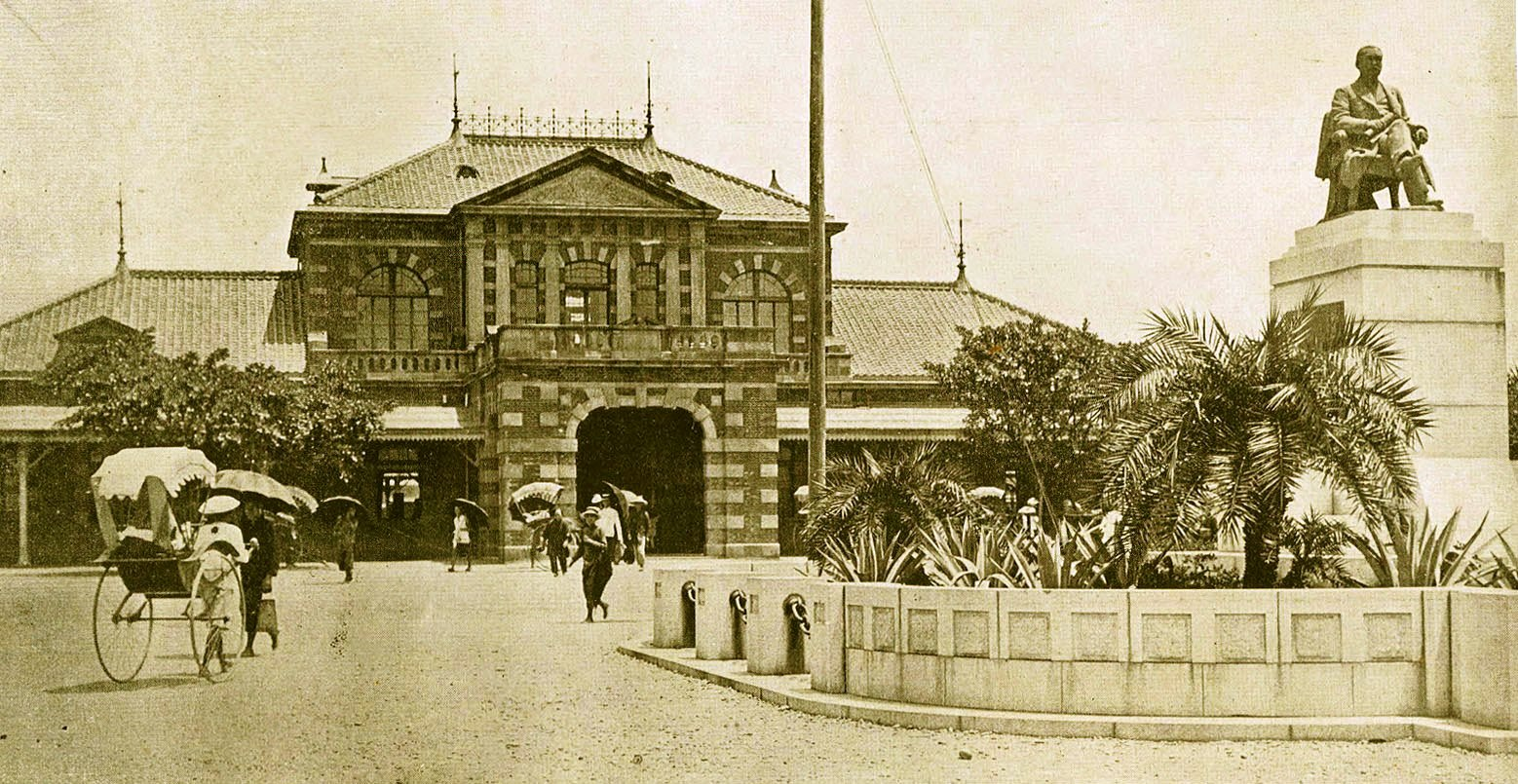
Taipei station in 1914

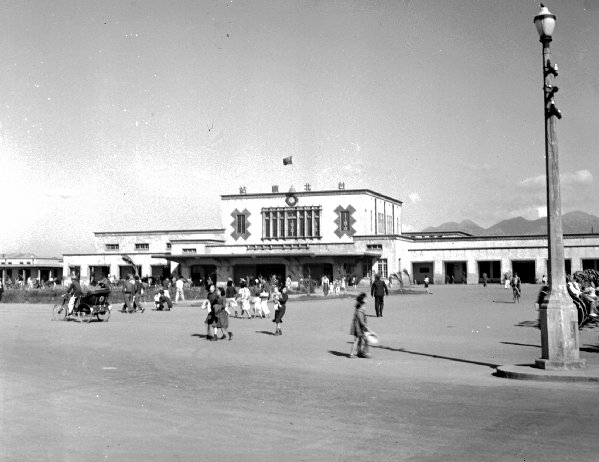
The old Taipei station in 1948

The first rail station in Taipei was completed in Twatutia in 1891, during Qing rule, when the railway to Keelung was opened for service. Initially, a temporary station was built while a permanent station was constructed in 1897, during Japanese rule (1895–1945). In 1901, the station was located to the east of its current site. It was rebuilt in 1940 to accommodate growing passenger traffic.

To alleviate traffic congestion caused by railroad crossings in downtown Taipei, an underground railway tunnel between Huashan and Wanhua was built along with the present station building as part of the Taipei Railway Underground Project. When the underground system was completed on 2 September 1989, railway service was moved to the newly completed building (completed on 5 September 1989) and the old building as well as a temporary station were demolished.

The current station was further expanded with the opening of the Taipei Metro. The metro station is connected to the basement of the railway station and opened to passenger traffic in 1997 to the Tamsui–Xinyi line. It became a massive transfer hub with the opening of the Bannan Line in 1999. Extensive underground malls now exist at the front and back of the station, which emulate those found in Tokyo and Osaka, Japan. The station also became a terminus for Taiwan High Speed Rail trains when the network began service in 2007.

The Taipei Main Station was a site of the 2025 Taipei stabbings.

=== Ongoing developments ===
Taipei station and the area surrounding it have been undergoing renovation since 2005. Japanese architect Fumihiko Maki was chosen to design two skyscrapers that will surround the railroad station. Maki will also oversee the renovation of Taipei station. The height of the taller tower will be 76 stories, whereas the shorter tower will be 56 stories. The two skyscrapers will be constructed on empty parcels found adjacent to Taipei station, above the Taoyuan Airport MRT station.

The station interior underwent renovation work from February to October 2011. Basement restrooms were renovated, the basement and first floor preparations for additional Breeze Plaza retail space began, the large ticket office in the first floor lobby was removed, and additional retail space was allocated. In addition, the flooring on the first floor was completely replaced, fire and evacuation regulations were improved, and solar panels will be installed on the station roof.

== See also ==
- Taipei Metro
- Taipei
- Rail transport in Taiwan
- List of railway stations in Taiwan
