= Zhongxiao Dunhua metro station =

Metro station in Taipei, Taiwan

Zhongxiao Dunhua 忠孝敦化
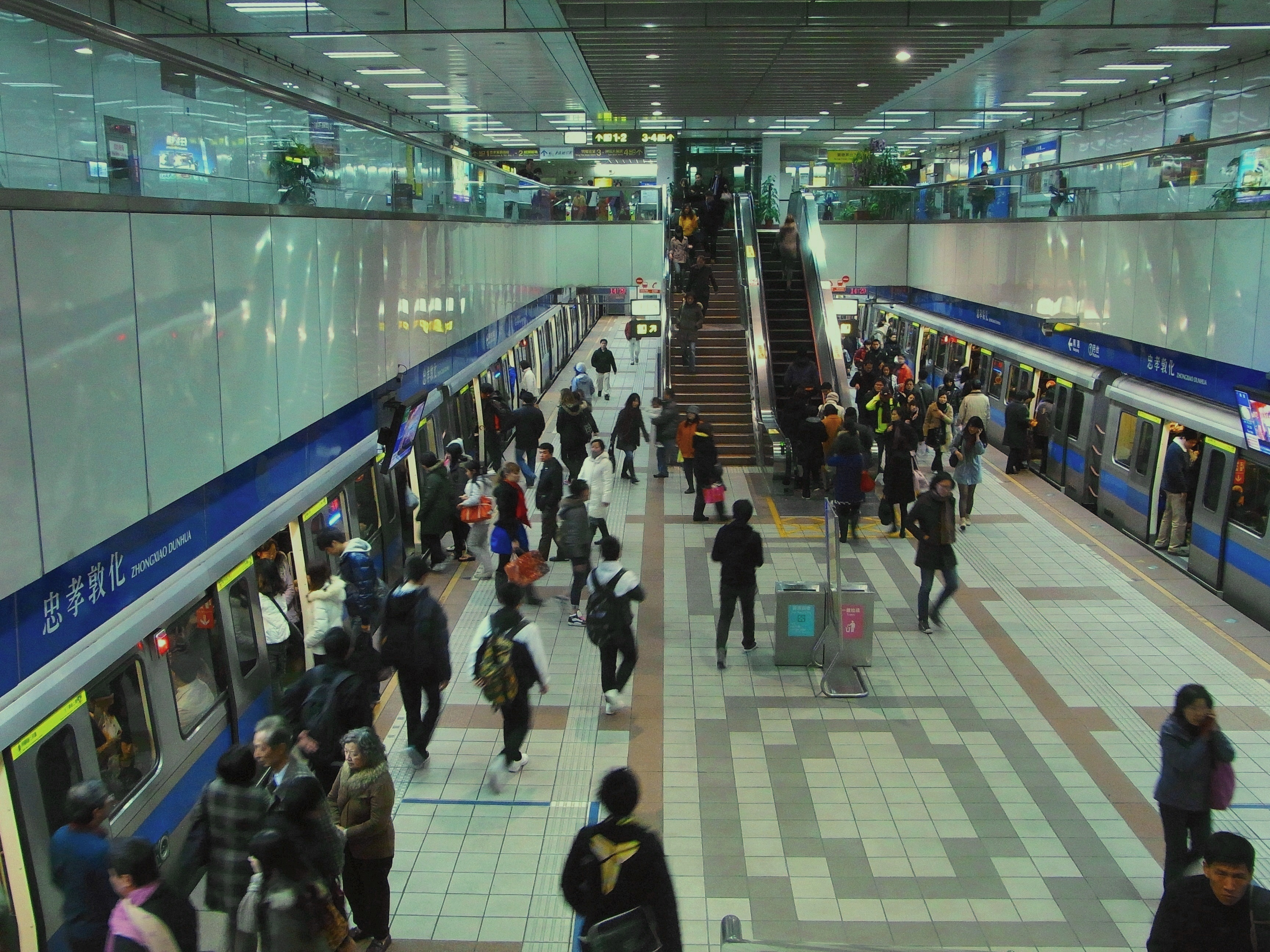
- Platform

Chinese name
- Chinese: 忠孝敦化
Transcriptions
Standard Mandarin
- Hanyu Pinyin: Zhōngxiào Dūnhuà
- Bopomofo: ㄓㄨㄥ ㄒㄧㄠˋ ㄉㄨㄣ ㄏㄨㄚˋ
- Wade–Giles: Chung¹-hsiao⁴ Tun¹-hua⁴
Hakka
- Pha̍k-fa-sṳ: Chûng-hau Tûn-fa
Southern Min
- Tâi-lô: Tiong-hàu Tun-huà

General information
- Location: 182 Sec 4 Zhongxiao E Rd; Da'an District, Taipei; Taiwan
- Coordinates: 25.0415°N 121.5508°E
- System: Taipei metro station

Construction
- Structure type: Underground
- Cycle facilities: Access available

Other information
- Station code: BL16
- Website: web.metro.taipei/e/stationdetail2010.asp?ID=BL16-091

History
- Opened: 1999-12-24

Passengers
- 2017: 27.499 million per year ▼2.77%
- Rank: (Ranked 12 of 119)

Services
Preceding station	Taipei Metro	Following station
Zhongxiao Fuxing towards Dingpu	Bannan line	Sun Yat-sen Memorial Hall towards Nangang Exhib Center
Location

Zhongxiao Dunhua (Chinese: 忠孝敦化, formerly transliterated as Chunghsiao Tunhua Station until 2003) is a metro station in Taipei, Taiwan served by Taipei Metro. It is a station on Bannan line.

== Station overview ==
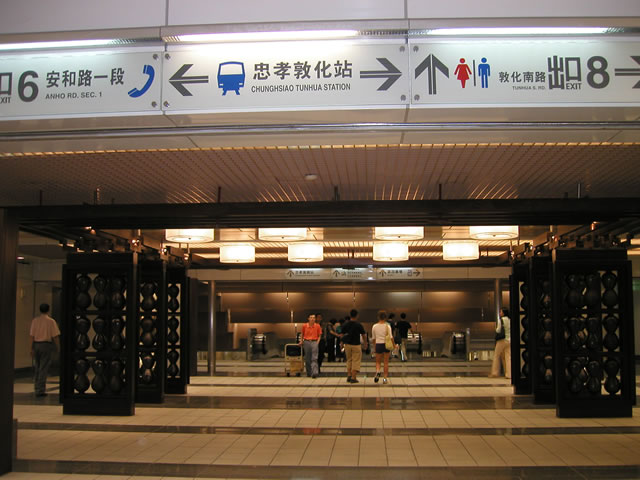
East Metro Mall entrance to the station

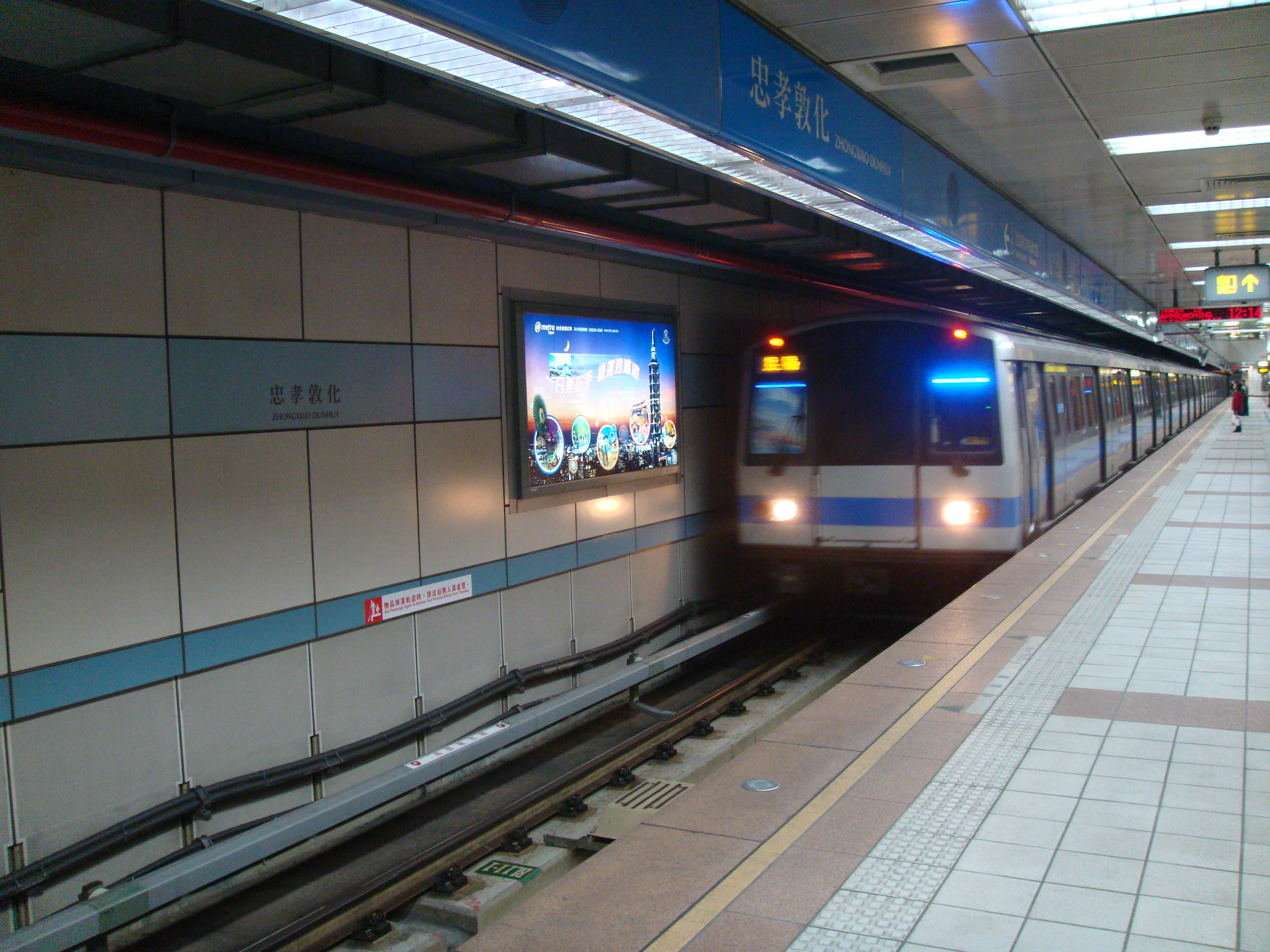
Zhongxiao Dunhua station platform

This is a three-level, underground station with an island platform and eight exits. It is located around the intersection of Zhongxiao East Rd. and Dunhua South Rd (hence the name of the station). It connects through the East Metro Mall to the neighboring Zhongxiao Fuxing station.

=== History ===
- 24 December 1999: Began service with the opening of the Taipei City Hall to Longshan Temple segment.
- 3 May 2009: A 62-year-old woman jumped off platform 2 and was immediately killed. The Taipei City Hall-Zhongxiao Fuxing segment was single-tracked until after midnight.

== Station layout ==
Street level	Entrance/exit	Entrance/exit
B1,2	Concourse, East Metro Mall	Lobby, information desk, automatic ticket dispensing machines, one-way faregates, East Metro Mall; Restrooms (outside fare zone, near exit 2 and 3)
B3	Platform 1	← Bannan line toward Nangang Exhib Center / Kunyang (BL17 Sun Yat-sen Memorial Hall)
B3	Island platform, doors will open on the left
B3	Platform 2	→ Bannan line toward Dingpu / Far Eastern Hospital (BL15 Zhongxiao Fuxing) →

=== Exits ===
- Exit 1: No.175, Zhongxiao E. Rd. Sec. 4
- Exit 2: No.203, Zhongxiao E. Rd. Sec. 4 Escalator
- Exit 3: No.182, Zhongxiao E. Rd. Sec. 4 (Ming Yao Department Store) Escalator
- Exit 4: No.166, Zhongxiao E. Rd. Sec. 4 (San Want Hotel)
- Exit 5: No.148, Zhongxiao E. Rd. Sec. 4 Escalator
- Exit 6: No.219, Dunhua S. Rd. Sec. 1
- Exit 7: No.151, Zhongxiao E. Rd. Sec. 4 Escalator
- Exit 8: No.209, Dunhua S. Rd. Sec. 1

== Around the station ==
- Dinho Shopping District
- Eslite Bookstore (Dunhua Branch)
- Singapore Trade Office in Taipei
- Sogo (Dunhua Branch)
- MING YAO Department Store - exit 3
- Breeze Center (Zhongxiao Branch)
- The International Commercial Bank of China (between this station and Sun Yat-sen Memorial Hall station)
- San Want Hotel - exit 4
- Lee Shih-chiao Art Museum
- Fuxing Elementary School
- Renai Junior High School
- Zhongshan Hospital
- Renai Elementary School

== Underground shopping ==
- East Metro Mall (connects directly to the station, toward Zhongxiao Fuxing)
