= Tucheng (disambiguation) =

Tucheng is a district in New Taipei City, Taiwan.

Tucheng or 土城 may also refer to:

- Tucheng Community (土城社区), Guanshaling Subdistrict, Yuelu District, Changsha, Hunan, China
- Tucheng Line, Taipei Metro
- Tucheng metro station, a metro station in New Taipei, Taiwan
- Tucheng Park, an urban park and historic site in Beijing
- Tucheng station (Tianjin Metro), a metro station in Tianjin, China
- Tucheng Town (土城镇), a town in Wuxi County, Chongqing Municipality, China.
- Tucheng Village (塗城里), an urban village in Dali District, Taichung, Taiwan
- Fu Tucheng (ca. 232–348 CE), a Buddhist monk
- Toseong Station (Hanja: 土城驛), a station of Busan Metro Line 1 in Toseong-dong
