= ASE WeMall =

Shopping mall in Tucheng, New Taipei, Taiwan

- 日月光廣場
- Location: No. 210, Section 2, Xuefu Road, Tucheng District, New Taipei, Taiwan
- Coordinates: 24°58′44″N 121°26′43″E
- Opened: July 26, 2018
- Owner: ASE Group
- Floor area: 25,000 m^{2} (270,000 sq ft)
- Public transit: Tucheng metro station and Haishan metro station
- Website: https://wemallsite.wixsite.com/asewemall

ASE WeMall (Chinese: 日月光廣場; pinyin: Rì Yùe Guāng Guǎngchǎng) is a shopping center in Tucheng District, New Taipei, Taiwan that opened on July 26, 2018. It is the first and largest shopping mall in the district. Owned and operated by ASE Group, the total floor area is about 25,000 m^{2} (270,000 sq ft). The main core stores of the mall include Carrefour Market, Showtime Cinemas, Starbucks, Daiso and various themed restaurants. It is located within walking distance of both Tucheng metro station and Haishan metro station.

== Floor Guide ==
Level 1	Lifestyle and Leisure
B1	Parking Lot
B2	Carrefour Market, Daiso, Giordano
B3	Parking Lot

== See also ==
- List of tourist attractions in Taiwan
