= Haishan metro station =

Metro station in New Taipei, Taiwan

Haishan 海山
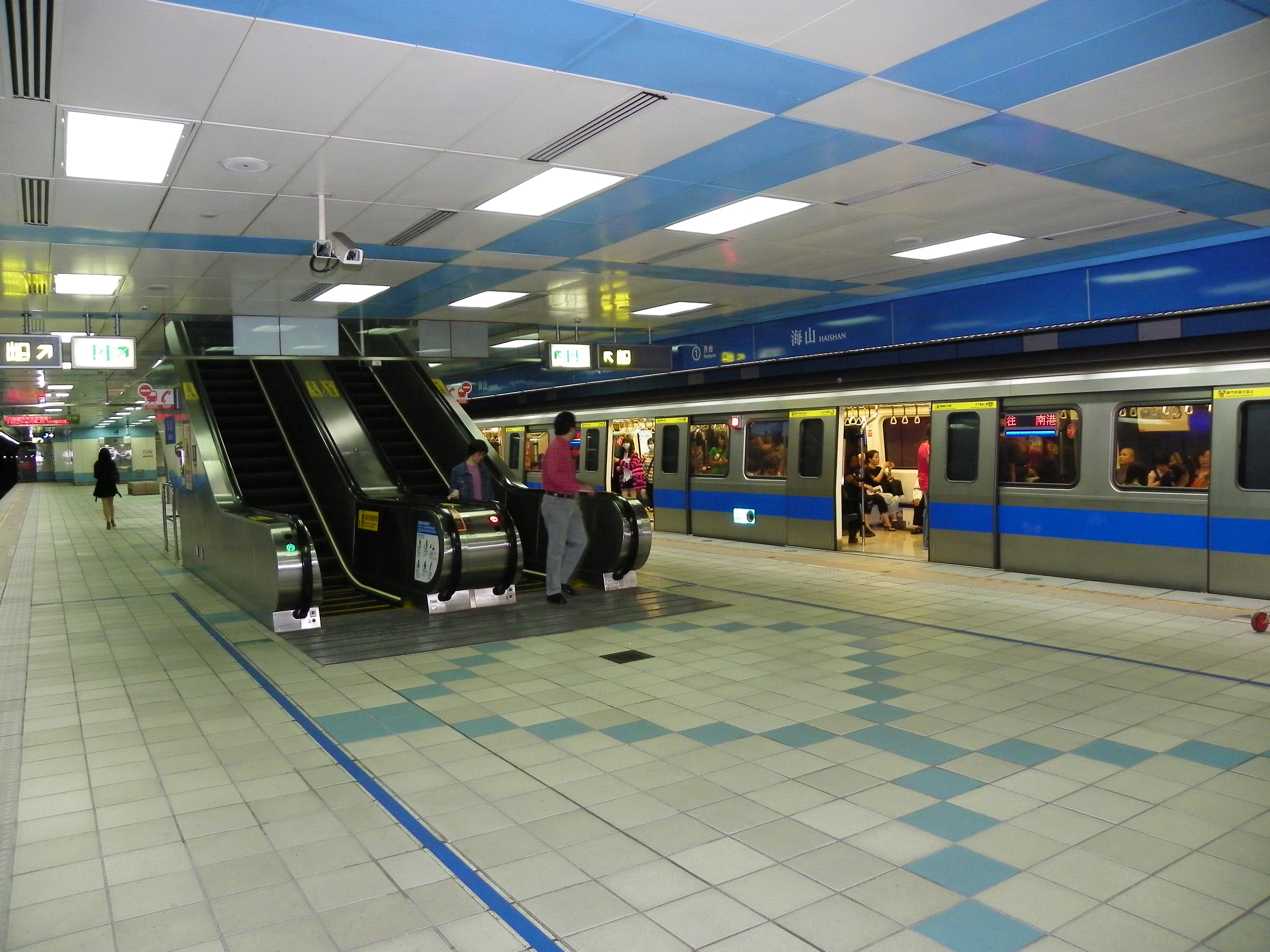
- Haishan station platform

Chinese name
- Chinese: 海山
- Literal meaning: Sea mountain
Transcriptions
Standard Mandarin
- Hanyu Pinyin: Hǎishān
- Bopomofo: ㄏㄞˇ ㄕㄢ
Hakka
- Pha̍k-fa-sṳ: Hói-sân
Southern Min
- Tâi-lô: Hai-san

General information
- Location: B2F, No. 16, Leli St. Tucheng, New Taipei; Taiwan
- Coordinates: 24.985229°N 121.448603°E
- Operated by: Taipei Metro
- Line: Bannan line (BL04)
- Connections: Bus stop

Construction
- Structure type: Underground

History
- Opened: 31 May 2006

Passengers
- 46,347 daily (December 2024)
- Rank: (Ranked 40 of 119)

Services
Preceding station	Taipei Metro	Following station
Tucheng towards Dingpu	Bannan line	Far Eastern Hospital towards Nangang Exhib Center
Location

The Taipei Metro Haishan station is a station on the Bannan line located in Tucheng District, New Taipei City, Taiwan.

== Station layout ==
Street level	Entrance/exit	Entrance/exit
B1	Concourse	Lobby, automatic ticket dispensing machine, information desk, one-way faregates Restrooms (south side, inside fare zone)
B2	Platform 1	← Bannan line towards Nangang Exhib Center (BL05 Far Eastern Hospital)
B2	Island platform, doors will open on the left
B2	Platform 2	→ Bannan line towards Dingpu (BL03 Tucheng) →

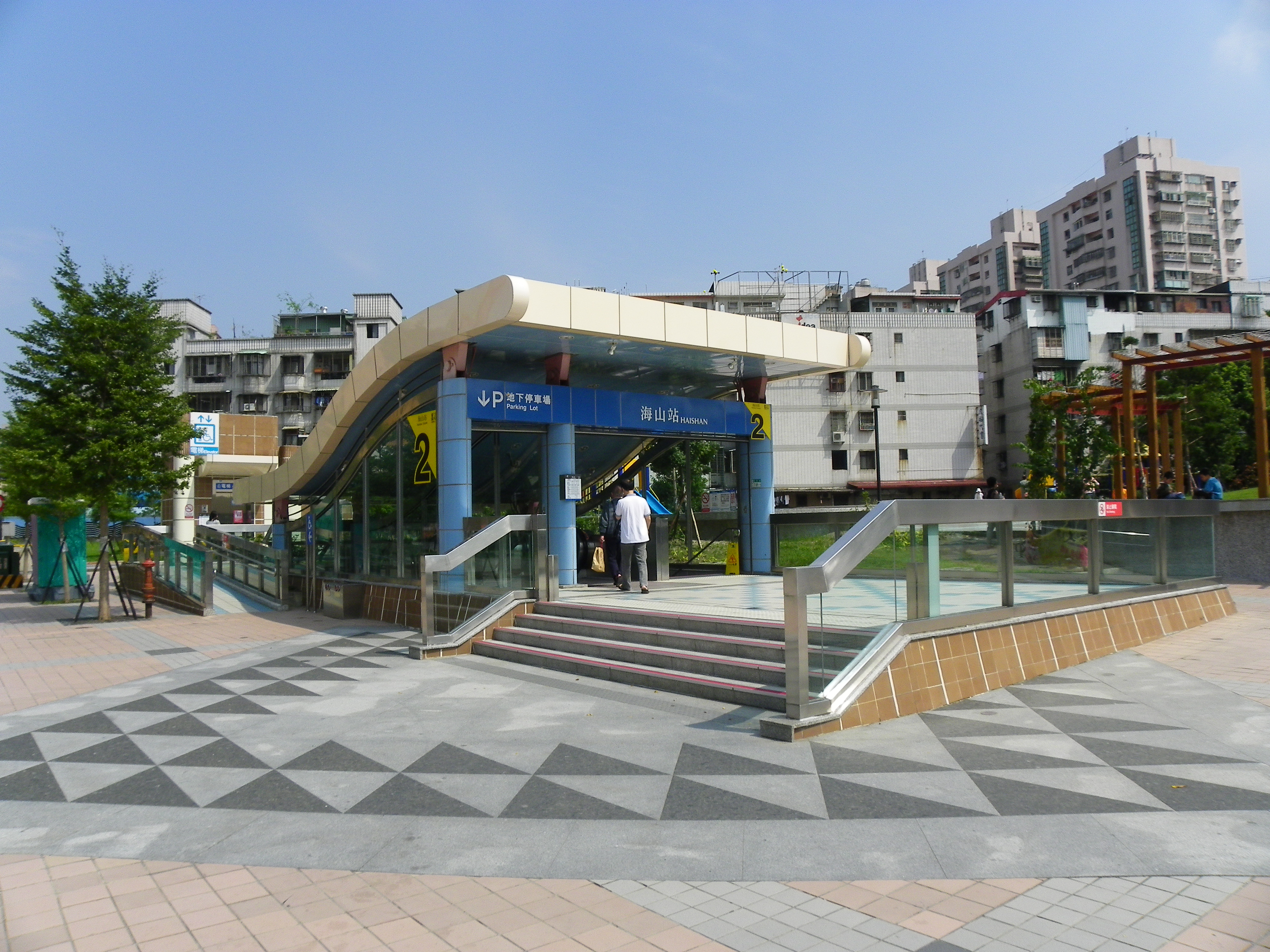
Haishan station exit 2

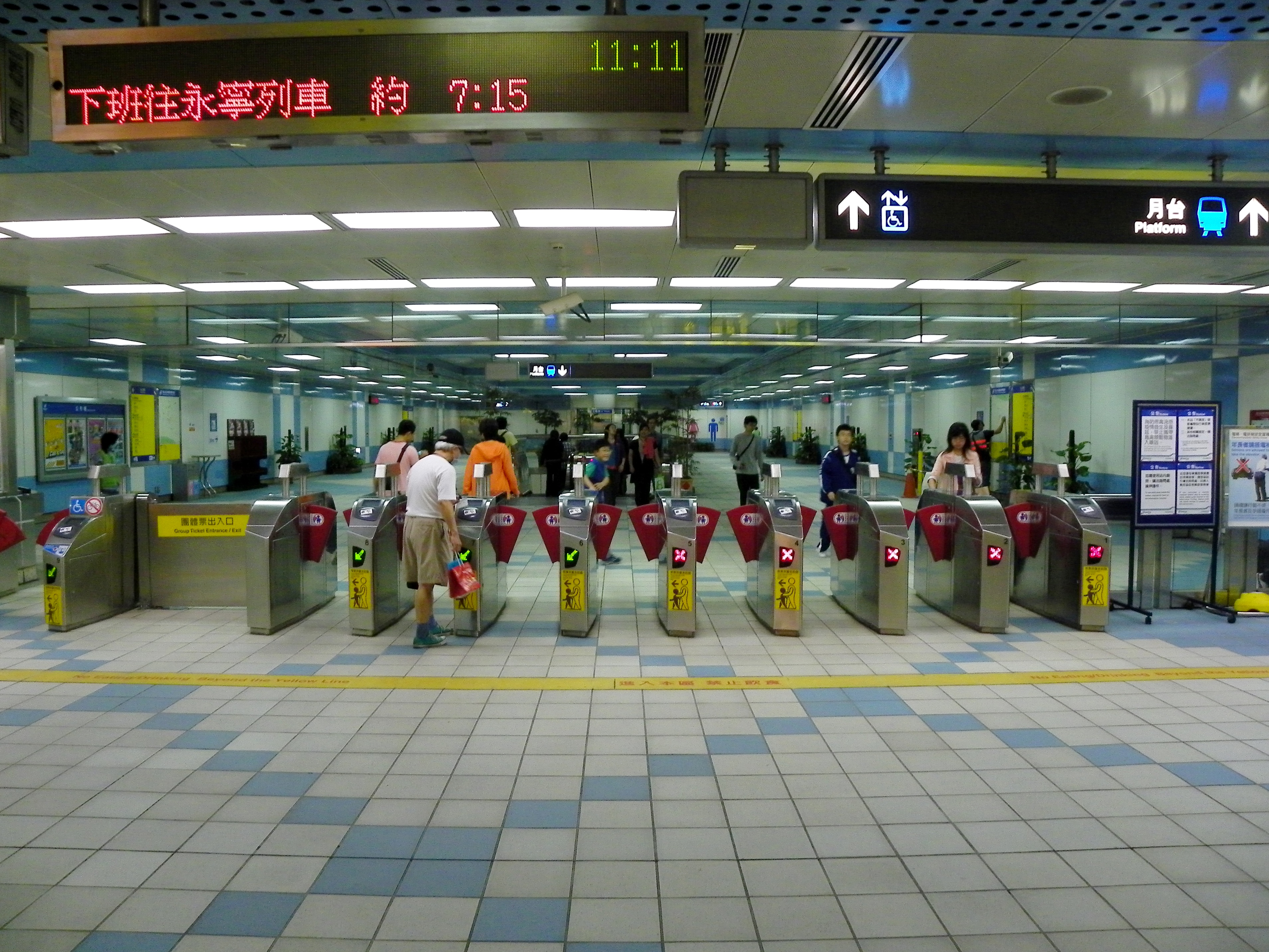
Haishan station concourse

The two-level, underground station with an island platform and three exits. It is located close to Mingde Rd. and Yuming Rd.

=== History ===
- 31 May 2006: The station opened as part of a western extension to Yongning.

=== Construction ===
The station is 200 meters long and 21 meters side. Initially, the proposed site was too narrow to construct a station. Thus, the neighboring Gongguan drain was changed into an underground drainage box. The station was constructed on top of the drain between National Haishan Industrial Vocational High School and Leli Elementary School.

=== Public art ===
Public art for the station is titled "Farm" and is located in the public square outside the station. It consists of 11 cows of differing sizes and forms which also act as street furniture. The painted ponds on the ground were created with the help of teachers and students from the nearby Leli Elementary School.

=== Exits ===
- Exit 1: Behind the Leli Elementary School
- Exit 2: Beside the sports ground of Haishan I.V. High School
- Exit 3: Alley 6, Lane 21, Yumin Rd. (adjacent to Yumin Rd.)

== Around the station ==
- Haishan Industrial Vocational High School
- Leli Elementary School
- Guangfu Elementary School
- Zhongzheng Junior High School
- Huorao Market
- Tucheng Gymnasium
