= Kunyang metro station =

Metro station in Taipei, Taiwan

Coordinates: 25.050492°N 121.593276°E

Kunyang 昆陽
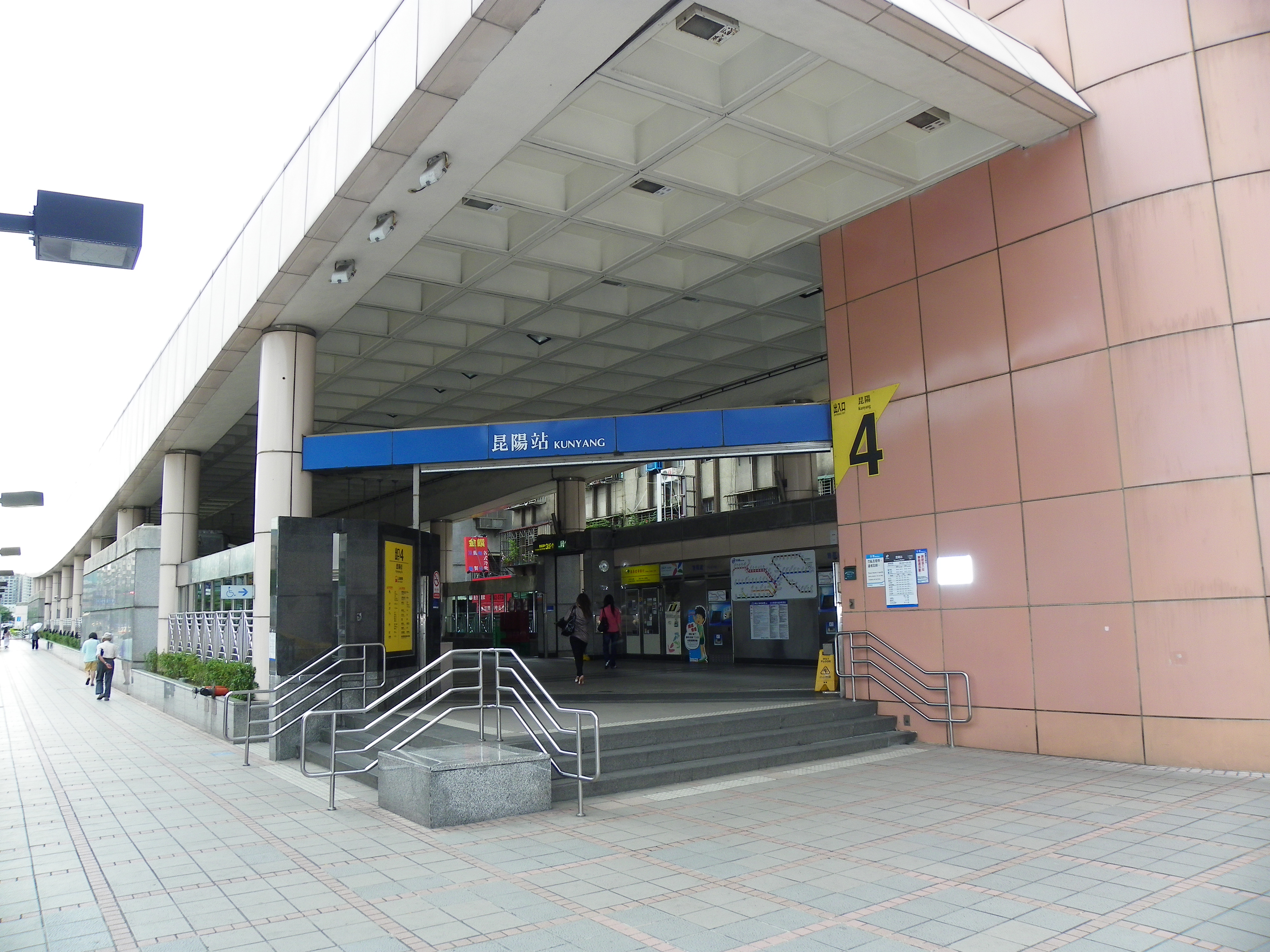
- Kunyang station exit 4

Chinese name
- Traditional Chinese: 昆陽
- Simplified Chinese: 昆阳
Transcriptions
Standard Mandarin
- Hanyu Pinyin: Kūnyáng
- Bopomofo: ㄎㄨㄣ ㄧㄤˊ
Hakka
- Pha̍k-fa-sṳ: Khûn-yòng
Southern Min
- Tâi-lô: Khun-iông

General information
- Location: No. 451, Sec. 6, Zhongxiao E. Rd. Nangang, Taipei; Taiwan
- Operated by: Taipei Metro
- Line: Bannan line (BL21)
- Connections: Bus stop

Construction
- Structure type: Underground

History
- Opened: 30 December 2000

Passengers
- daily (December 2024)
- Rank: 56 out of 109

Services
Preceding station	Taipei Metro	Following station
Houshanpi towards Dingpu	Bannan line	Nangang towards Nangang Exhib Center
Houshanpi towards Dingpu	Bannan line	Terminus
Location

The Taipei Metro Kunyang station is a station on the Bannan line located in Nangang District, Taipei, Taiwan.

== Station overview ==
The two-level, underground station and has one island platform and four exits. It is located beneath Zhongxiao East Rd.

Public art for the station is titled "Around" and is composed of carousel horses that dance to music whenever the viewer comes near. They are located along the glass windows of the concourse level.

== Station layout ==
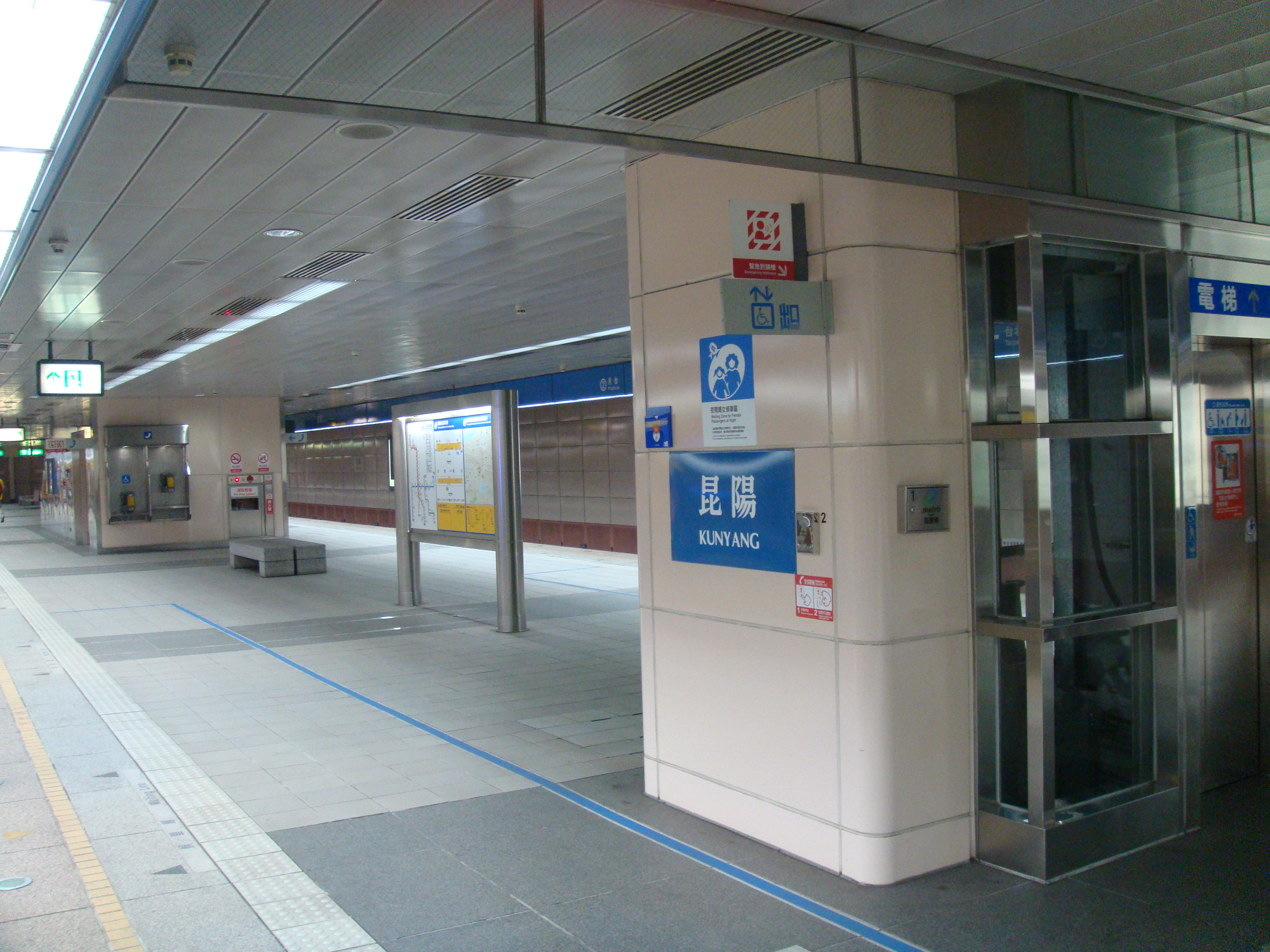
Kunyang station platform

Street level	Concourse	Entrance/exit, lobby, information desk, automatic ticket dispensing machines, one-way faregates, restrooms (inside ticketed area)
B2	Platform 1	← Bannan line toward Nangang Exhib Center (BL22 Nangang) ← Bannan line termination platform
B2	Island platform, doors will open on the left
B2	Platform 2	→ Bannan line toward Dingpu / Far Eastern Hospital (BL20 Houshanpi) →

Any Bannan line trains from Dingpu or Far Eastern Hospital terminate here during non-rush hours or when they are being transferred to the Nangang Depot; otherwise they go to Taipei Nangang Exhibition Center. This also served as the eastern terminal station of this line from 2000 to 2008, when Nangang opened for MRT service.

=== Exits ===
- Exit 1: Combined Logistics Command Headquarters
- Exit 2: Lane 403, Zhongxiao Rd. Sec.6
- Exit 3: Nangang Senior High School
- Exit 4: Kunyang St.

== Around the station ==
- Taipei Metro Nangang Depot
- Ministry of National Defense
- Ministry of Health and Welfare
- Nangang High School
- Chengde Elementary School (between this station and Houshanpi station)
- Nangang Park
