= Far Eastern Hospital metro station =

Metro station in New Taipei, Taiwan

Far Eastern Hospital 亞東醫院
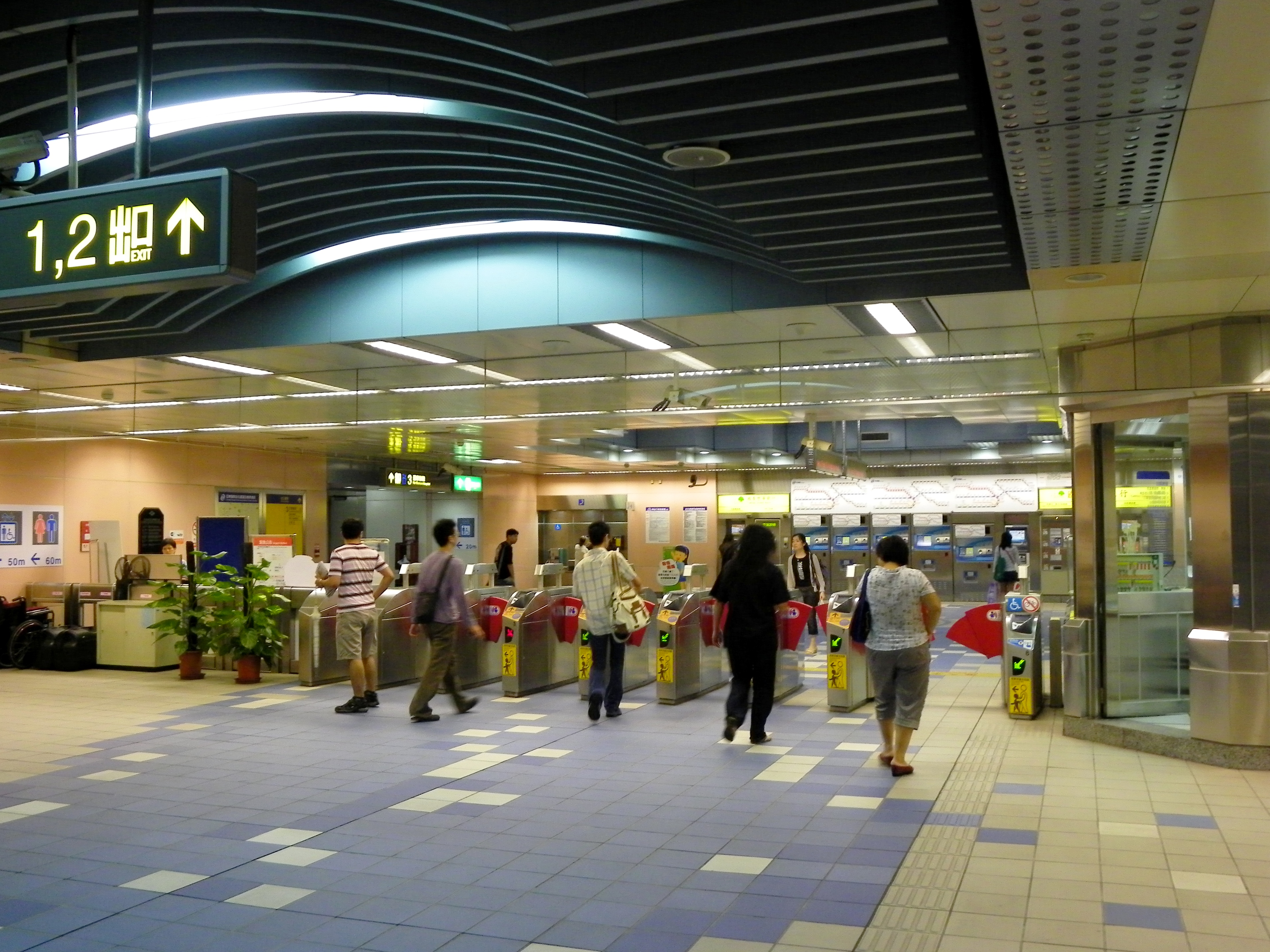
- Fare gates

Chinese name
- Traditional Chinese: 亞東醫院
- Simplified Chinese: 亚东医院
Transcriptions
Standard Mandarin
- Hanyu Pinyin: Yǎdōng Yīyuàn
- Bopomofo: ㄧㄚˇ ㄉㄨㄥ ㄧ ㄩㄢˋ ㄓㄢˋ
Hakka
- Pha̍k-fa-sṳ: Â-tûng Yî-yèn
Southern Min
- Tâi-lô: A-tāng Bēnn-īnn

General information
- Location: B1F 17 Sec 2 Nanya S Rd; Banqiao District, New Taipei City; Taiwan
- Coordinates: 24.9986°N 121.4526°E
- System: Taipei metro station

Construction
- Structure type: Underground
- Cycle facilities: Access available

Other information
- Station code: BL05
- Website: web.metro.taipei/e/stationdetail2010.asp?ID=BL05-080

History
- Opened: 2006-05-31

Passengers
- 2018: 15.510 million per year ▲10.37%
- Rank: 39 out of 108

Services
Preceding station	Taipei Metro	Following station
Haishan towards Dingpu	Bannan line	Fuzhong towards Nangang Exhib Center
Terminus	Bannan line	Fuzhong towards Nangang Exhib Center
Location

Far Eastern Hospital (Chinese: 亞東醫院; pinyin: Yǎdōng Yīyuàn) is a metro station in Taipei, Taiwan served by Taipei Metro on the Bannan line.

== Station layout ==
Street level	Exit	Far Eastern Memorial Hospital
B1	Concourse	Lobby, ticket machine, information desk, one-way faregates Restrooms (inside fare zone)
B2	Platform 1	← Bannan line toward Nangang Exhib Center / Kunyang (BL06 Fuzhong)
B2	Island platform, doors will open on the left
B2	Platform 2	→ Bannan line toward Dingpu (BL04 Haishan) → → Bannan line termination platform →

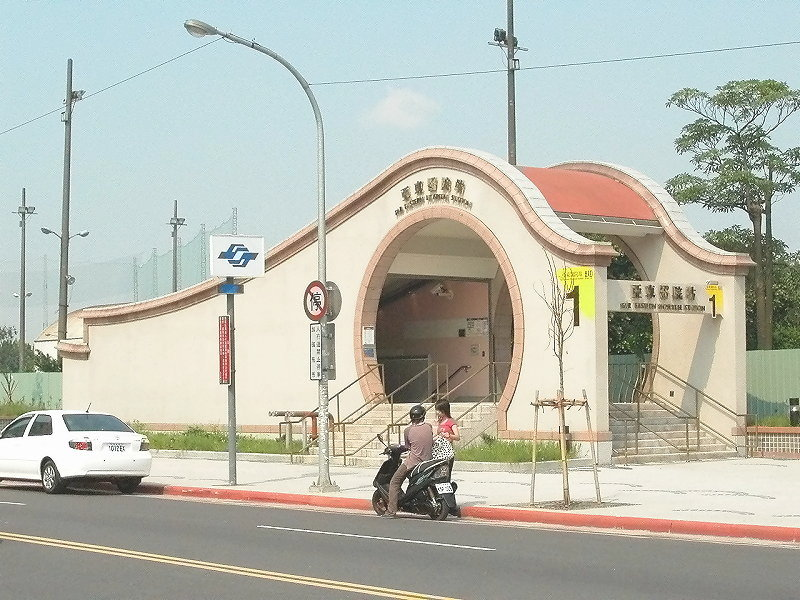
Far Eastern Hospital station exit 1: an arch bridge style entrance

The two-level underground station makes use of island platforms and has three exits. The station is 243 meters long and 20.5 meters wide. Blue line trains from Kunyang or Taipei Nangang Exhibition Center terminate here during non-rush hours.

== Design ==
The entrance to the station was designed as an arch bridge (from "qiao" in Banqiao, meaning "bridge"). It is also meant to represent a "cloud wall", a characteristic of traditional Chinese gardening; the station is located next to Yuanzhi Memorial Garden.

Public art in the station consists of a piece titled "River Romance", which combines LED lamps with glass sticks to create a color-changing "river of time". Poems are engraved on the glass sticks, which look like moving waves from a distance.

== Around the station ==
- Far Eastern Memorial Hospital
- Asia Eastern University of Science and Technology
- New Taipei City Library
- Taipei Far Eastern Telecom Park
- TPKC Cloud Computing Center
- A.mart Banqiao Nanya Store
