= Taiwan Nougat Creativity Museum =

Museum in Tucheng, New Taipei, Taiwan

Taiwan Nougat Museum
- 牛軋糖博物館
- Location: Tucheng, New Taipei, Taiwan
- Coordinates: 24°58′22.2″N 121°25′57.6″E
- Type: Museum
- Public transit access: Yongning Station

The Taiwan Nougat Museum (traditional Chinese: 牛軋糖博物館; simplified Chinese: 牛轧糖博物馆; pinyin: Niúgátáng Bówùguǎn) is a museum about nougat based in Tucheng District, New Taipei, Taiwan.

== Exhibitions ==
The museum exhibits the cultural relics, traditional wedding and engagement, cake tools and baking etc.

== Transportation ==
The museum is accessible within walking distance North from Yongning Station of the Taipei Metro.

== See also ==
- List of museums in Taiwan
- List of food and beverage museums
