= New Taipei Industrial Vocational High School =

Coordinates: 24.9826°N 121.4501°E

New Taipei Municipal New Taipei Industrial Vocational High School

Information
- School district: Tucheng, New Taipei, Taiwan
- Faculty: 182
- Enrollment: about 2200
- Website: www.ntvs.ntpc.edu.tw

New Taipei Municipal New Taipei Industrial High School is an industrial high school in Tucheng District, New Taipei, Taiwan.

== History ==
New Taipei Industrial Vocational High School was established in 1970. It offers studies in eleven academic disciplines, including machinery, casting, auto mechanics, mold, mechanical drafting, electronic engineering/electronic, data processing, special education, applied foreign language, computer science and physical education.

A continuing education school is available for the purpose lifetime education.
