= Far Eastern Memorial Hospital =

Hospital in Banqiao, New Taipei, Taiwan

Far Eastern Memorial Hospital 亞東紀念醫院
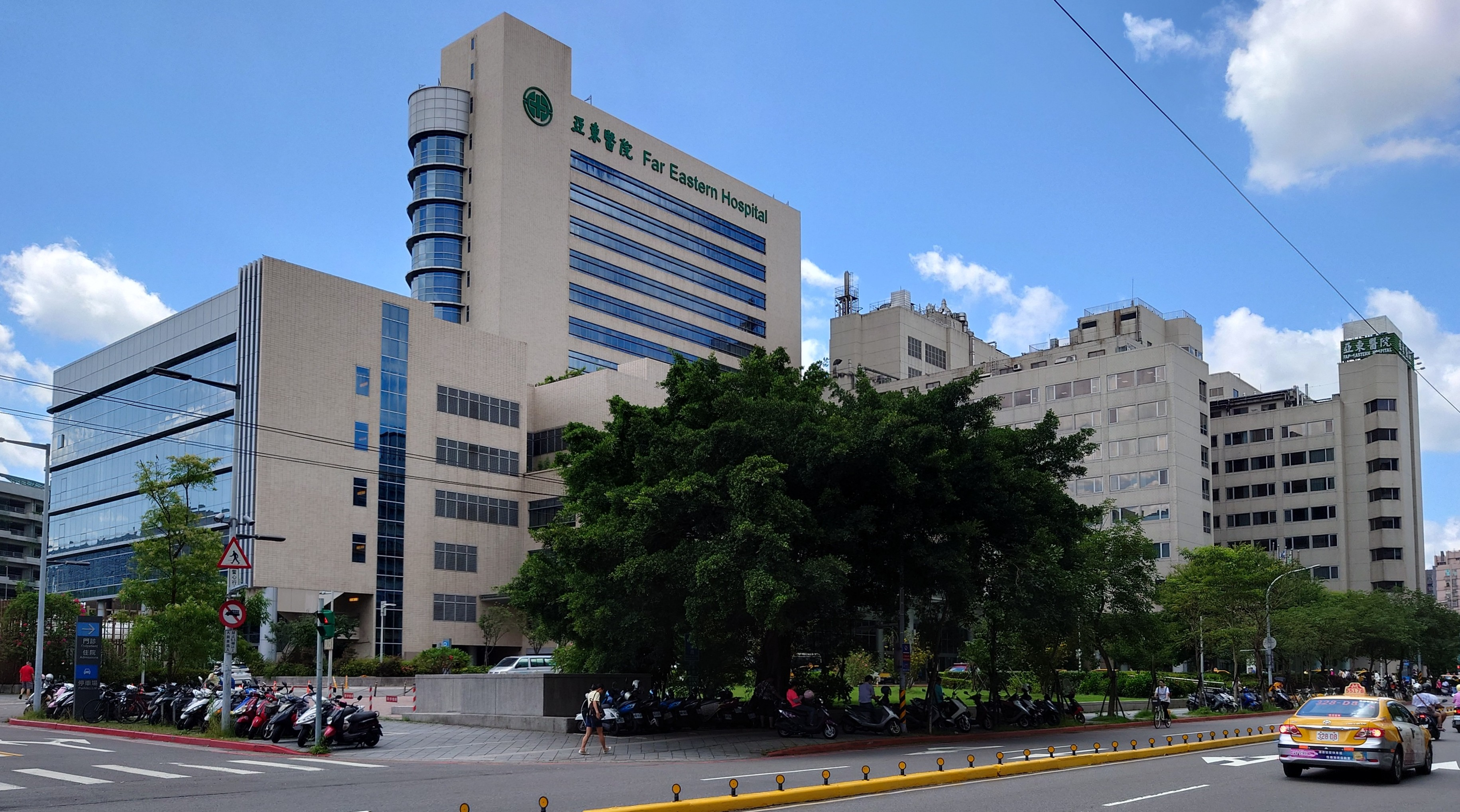

Geography
- Location: Banqiao, New Taipei, Taiwan
- Coordinates: 24°59′50.0″N 121°27′11.3″E

Organisation
- Care system: Private
- Type: District General, Teaching
- Affiliated university: Asia Eastern University of Science and Technology

Services
- Emergency department: Yes
- Beds: 1567

History
- Opened: 1 April 1981

Links
- Website: Official website

The Far Eastern Memorial Hospital (FEMH; traditional Chinese: 亞東紀念醫院; simplified Chinese: 亚东纪念医院; pinyin: Yàdōng Jìniàn Yīyuàn) is a large for-profit teaching hospital in Banqiao District, New Taipei, Taiwan.

== History ==
The hospital was established on 1 April 1981. In 1985, the hospital became a secondary teaching hospital after it was accredited by the Ministry of Education. In 1988, it became a district hospital. In 1991, it became a district and teaching hospital. In 2000, it became a district and class II teaching hospital. In 2009, it was accredited to be a medical center.

On 17 May 2021, the hospital reported seven new domestic COVID-19 cases.

== Transportation ==
The hospital is accessible from Far Eastern Hospital Station of Taipei Metro.

== See also ==
- List of hospitals in Taiwan
