= Tucheng metro station =

Metro station in New Taipei, Taiwan

Tucheng /LG11 土城
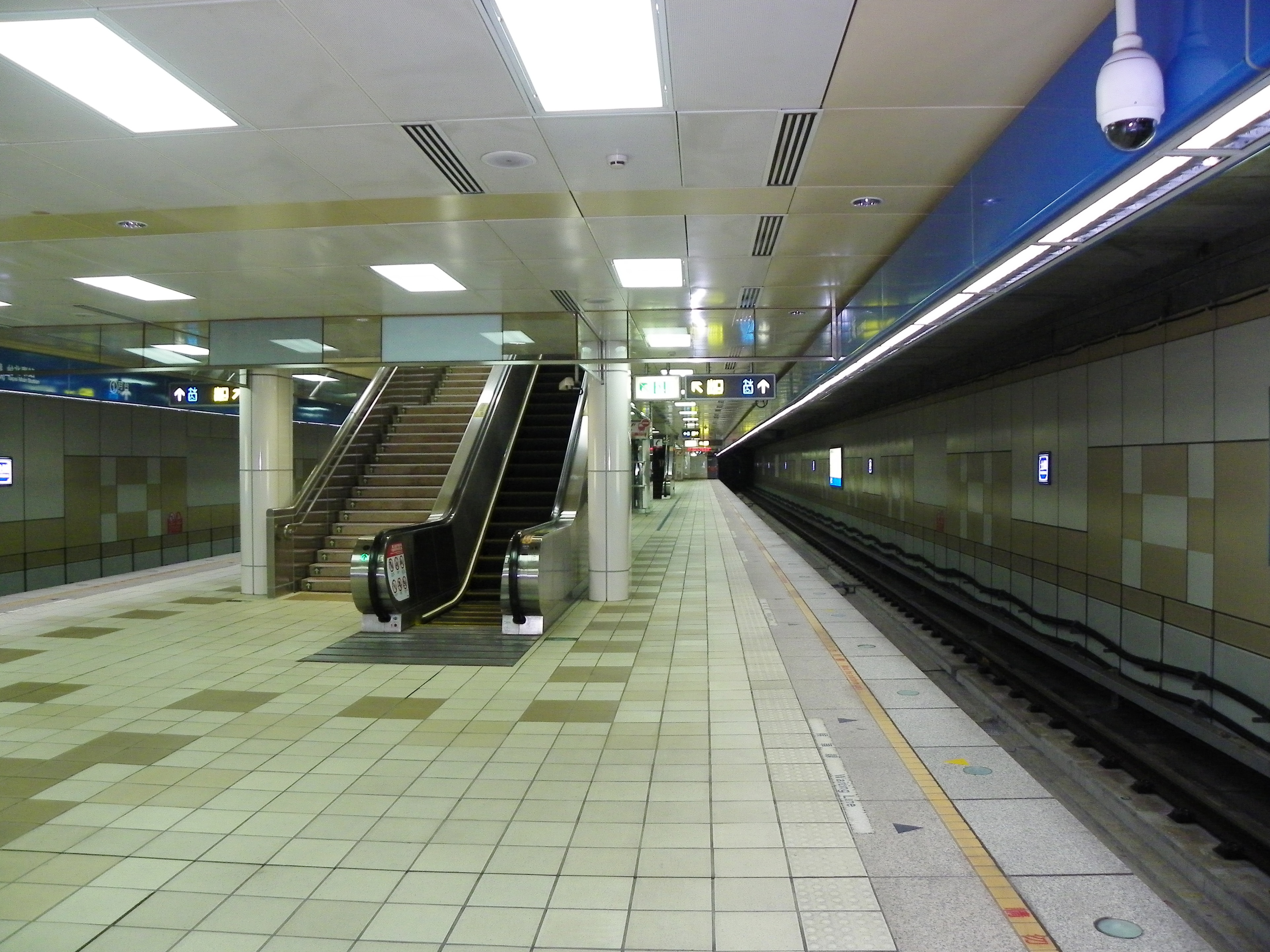
- Tucheng station platform

Chinese name
- Chinese: 土城
Transcriptions
Standard Mandarin
- Hanyu Pinyin: Tǔchéng
- Bopomofo: ㄊㄨˇ ㄔㄥˊ
Hakka
- Pha̍k-fa-sṳ: Thú-sàng
Southern Min
- Tâi-lô: Thóo-siânn

General information
- Location: B1F, No. 105, Sec. 1, Jincheng Rd. Tucheng, New Taipei; Taiwan
- Coordinates: 24°58′20″N 121°26′38″E
- Operator: Taipei Metro
- Lines: Bannan line (BL03); Wanda-Zhonghe-Shulin line (LG11)
- Connections: Bus stop

Construction
- Structure type: Underground (Bannan line); Elevated (Wanda-Zhonghe-Shulin line)

Other information
- Station code: / LG11

History
- Opened: 31 May 2006

Passengers
- daily (December 2024)
- Rank: Undetermined

Services
Preceding station	Taipei Metro	Following station
Yongning towards Dingpu	Bannan line	Haishan towards Nangang Exhib Center
Qingshui towards Chiang Kai-shek Memorial Hall	Wanda–Shulin line Future Service	Pitang towards Huilong
Location

The Tucheng Station of the Taipei Metro is a station on the Bannan line located in Tucheng District, New Taipei, Taiwan. It will become be a transfer station with the Wanda–Zhonghe–Shulin line in 2028.

== Station layout ==
Street level	Entrance/exit	Entrance/exit
B1	Concourse	Lobby, automatic ticket dispensing machine, information desk, one-way faregates Restrooms (north side, outside fare zone near exit 3)
B2	Platform 1	← Bannan line towards Nangang Exhib Center (BL04 Haishan)
B2	Island platform, doors will open on the left
B2	Platform 2	→ Bannan line towards Dingpu (BL02 Yongning) →

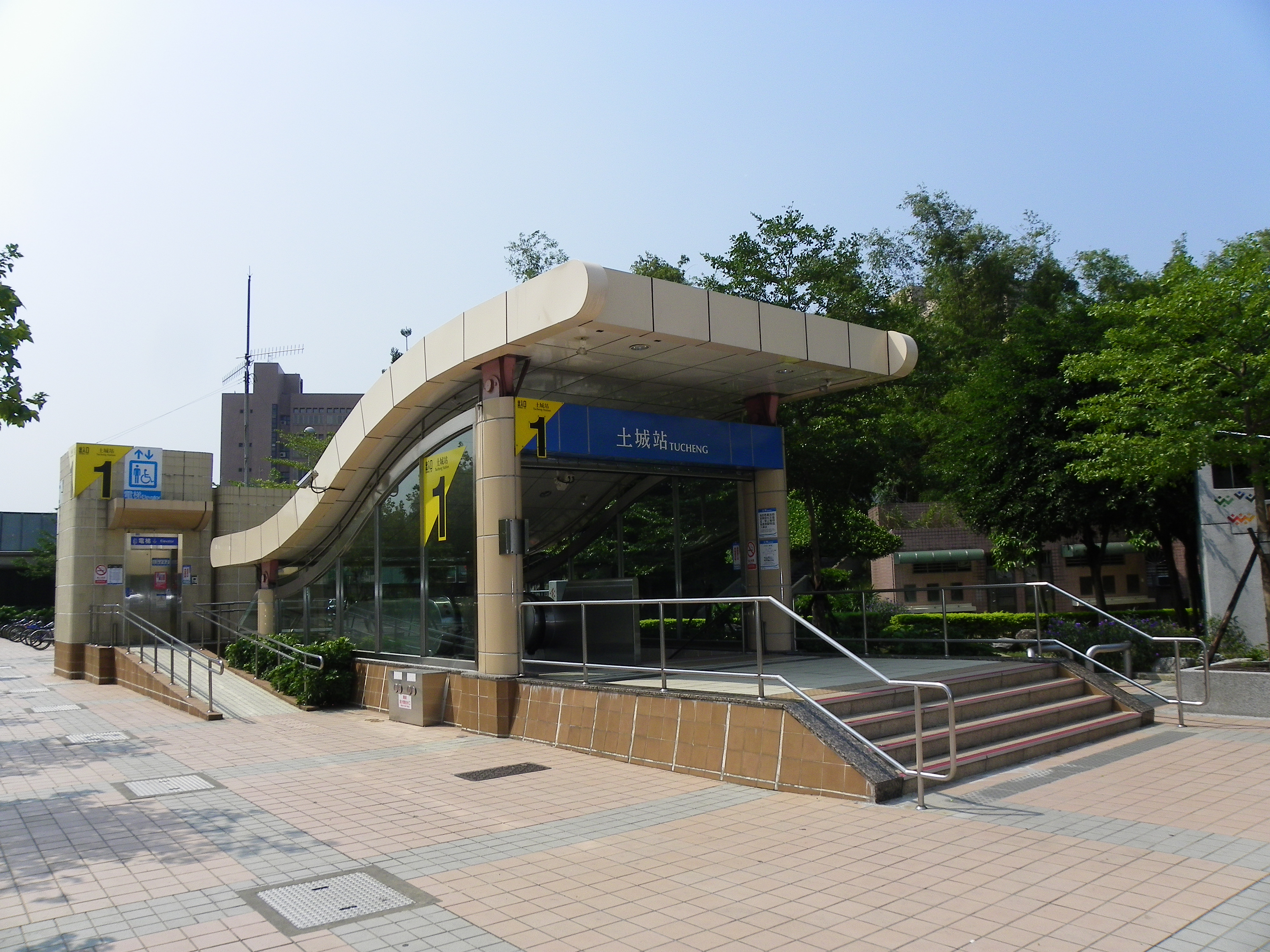
Tucheng station exit 1

This two-level, underground station is an island platform configuration and has three exits. It is located underneath Jincheng Rd. at its intersection with Heping Rd.

It will become a transfer station with the Wanda-Shulin Line, scheduled to open in 2028.

=== History ===
- 31 May 2006: Opened for service with the opening of the segment from Fuzhong to Yongning.
- 28 September 2018: Automatic platform gates were installed on Blue Line, as last batch of installation make all stations on Taipei Metro have a form of platform doors.
- 2028: The Wanda-Shulin Line became a transfer line.

=== Public art ===
Public art for the station consists of a faux archeological piece titled "The Legend of Gold Town". Produced through high-tech means, the piece is displayed similarly to how excavated artifacts are displayed. It depicts historical diversity and the development of the Tucheng area and represent the creativity and local characteristics of Tucheng.

=== Exits ===
- Exit 1: Jincheng Rd. Sec. 1
- Exit 2: Intersection of Jincheng Rd. Sec. 1 and Heping Rd.
- Exit 3: Jingcheng Rd. Sec. 1

== Around the station ==
Parks

- Jincheng Park
- Tucheng Tung Blossom Park
- Zhanlongshanyizhi Cultural Park

Libraries

- Tucheng District Library
- New Taipei City Library Tucheng Branch

Schools and universities

- De Lin Institute of Technology
- Tucheng Elementary School

Government offices

- Tucheng District Office

Banks

- Hua Nan Commercial Bank, Ltd. (between this station and Yongning station)

Museums and galleries

- Tucheng Art Hall

Shopping malls

- ASE WeMall

Hospitals

- New Taipei City Tucheng Hospital
