= Sanying Line =

Metro line in New Taipei, Taiwan

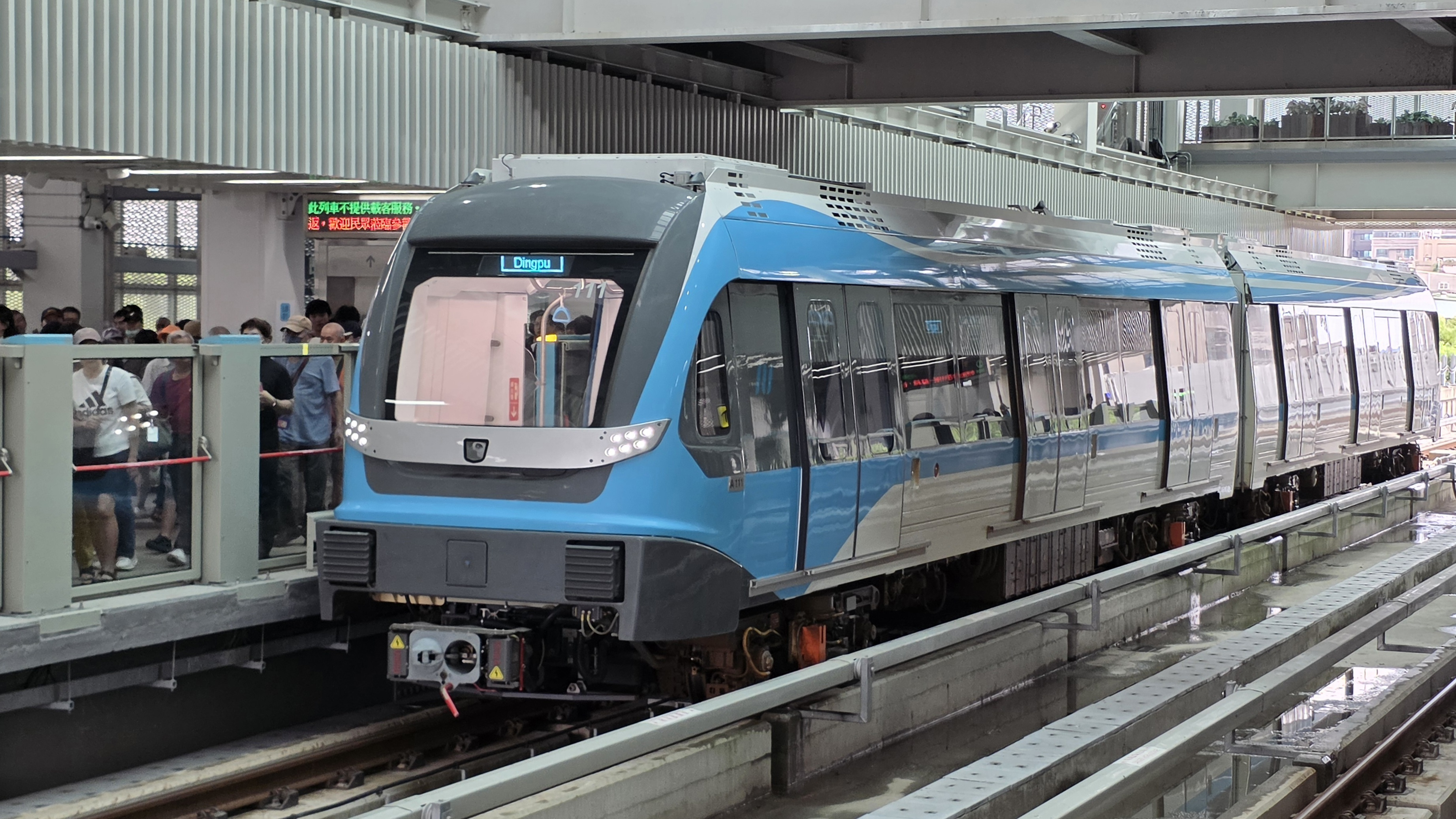
- The Sanying Line EMU at Dingpu metro station (shot on June 30, 2026)

Overview
- Other name: Light Blue line
- Native name: 三鶯線
- Status: In service (Note: The Da'nan extension is under construction)
- Owner: DRTS, New Taipei
- Locale: New Taipei City; Taoyuan (extension)
- Termini: Dingpu; Yingtao Fude (Note: Future: Da'nan)
- Stations: 12 (Note: Excluding extension to Taoyuan)
- Color on map: Light blue

Service
- Type: Light metro
- System: New Taipei Metro
- Operator: New Taipei Metro Corporation
- Depot: Sanxia
- Rolling stock: Hitachi Rail Italy Driverless Metro

History
- Work began: 2016
- Opened: 30 June 2026

Technical
- Line length: 14.3 km (8.9 mi)
- Num of tracks: 2
- Character: Elevated and underground
- Track gauge: 1,435 mm (4 ft 8 1/2 in) standard gauge
- Electrification: 750 V DC third rail

Sanying Line
- Traditional Chinese: 三鶯線
- Simplified Chinese: 三莺线
Transcriptions
Standard Mandarin
- Hanyu Pinyin: Sānyīng xiàn
- Wade–Giles: San^{1}-ying^{1} Hsien^{4}
- Tongyong Pinyin: Sānyīng-Siàn
Southern Min
- Hokkien POJ: Saⁿ-Eng-Sòaⁿ

The Sanying Line (Chinese: 三鶯線; code LB) is a light metro line in New Taipei City, Taiwan. Its name is formed from the first chinese characters of Sanxia and Yingge. This line is 14.29 kilometres (8.88 mi) long and has 12 stations and one depot. It runs from Dingpu station on the Bannan Line along Zhongyang Road to Sanxia District, and then crosses National Freeway No. 3 to Yingge District.

Soon, this line will extend into Taoyuan (Danan station).

== History ==
Approval for the construction of the line was given by the central government on 2 June 2015.

A turnkey contract was signed with Hitachi Rail STS and Hitachi Rail Italy as members of the ARH consortium on 21 June 2016. As leader of the consortium, Hitachi Rail STS's scope of work included the supply of train control technology and all the electromechanical systems for an equivalent value of €219.8 million (VAT excluded). Hitachi's scope of work included the design and manufacture of 29 two-car trains.

The main project started construction on 21 July 2016 and was opened to traffic on 30 June 2026.

=== Taoyuan extension ===
An extension from Yingtao Fude station in New Taipei City to Danan station in Taoyuan was approved for construction on 1 August 2025, with construction planned to begin in late 2026. The three-station extension will be 4.03 kilometres (2.50 mi) in length and cost roughly NT$16.06 billion (US$496 million). It will connect the New Taipei Metro to the Taoyuan Metro's Green line at Danan Station.

== Controversy ==
In August 2017, residents of Sanxia District protested against the planned station at Mazutian, citing controversy over land usage.

== Stations ==
Code (Note: Italic for constructing or planning stations)	Station name	Station type		Locale		Sta. distance (km)		Opened date	Transfer
Code	Station name	Structure	Platform	Locale		Previous	Total	Opened date	Transfer
Sanying Line
LB01	Dingpu 頂埔	Elevated	Side	Tucheng	New Taipei	—N/a	0.000	2026-06-30	Bannan Line
LB02	Mazutian 媽祖田	Elevated	Side	Tucheng	New Taipei	1.005	1.005	2026-06-30	—N/a
LB03	Changshoushan 長壽山	Elevated	Side	Sanxia	New Taipei	1.417	2.422	2026-06-30	—N/a
LB04	Hengxi 橫溪	Elevated	Island	Sanxia	New Taipei	1.397	3.819	2026-06-30	—N/a
LB05	Longpu 龍埔	Elevated	Side	Sanxia	New Taipei	0.926	4.745	2026-06-30	—N/a
LB06	Sanxia 三峽	Elevated	Side	Sanxia	New Taipei	0.941	5.686	2026-06-30	—N/a
LB07	National Taipei University 臺北大學	Elevated	Side	Sanxia	New Taipei	1.192	6.878	2026-06-30	—N/a
LB08	Yingge Station 鶯歌車站	Elevated	Island	Yingge	New Taipei	2.980	9.858	2026-06-30	Western Trunk line
LB09	Ceramics Old Street 陶瓷老街	Elevated	Island	Yingge	New Taipei	0.783	10.641	2026-06-30	—N/a
LB10	Guohua 國華	Elevated	Island	Yingge	New Taipei	0.894	11.535	2026-06-30	—N/a
LB11	Yongji Park 永吉公園	Elevated	Side	Yingge	New Taipei	1.293	12.828	2026-06-30	—N/a
LB12	Yingtao Fude 鶯桃福德	Elevated	Side	Yingge	New Taipei	0.952	13.780	2026-06-30	—N/a
LB12a	Unreleased	Elevated	Side	Bade	Taoyuan	1.225	15.005	Est. 2034	—N/a
LB13	Unreleased	Elevated	Side	Bade	Taoyuan	1.158	16.163	Est. 2034	—N/a
LB14	Danan 大湳	Underground	Island	Bade	Taoyuan	1.842	18.005	Est. 2034	Green line

== Rolling stock ==
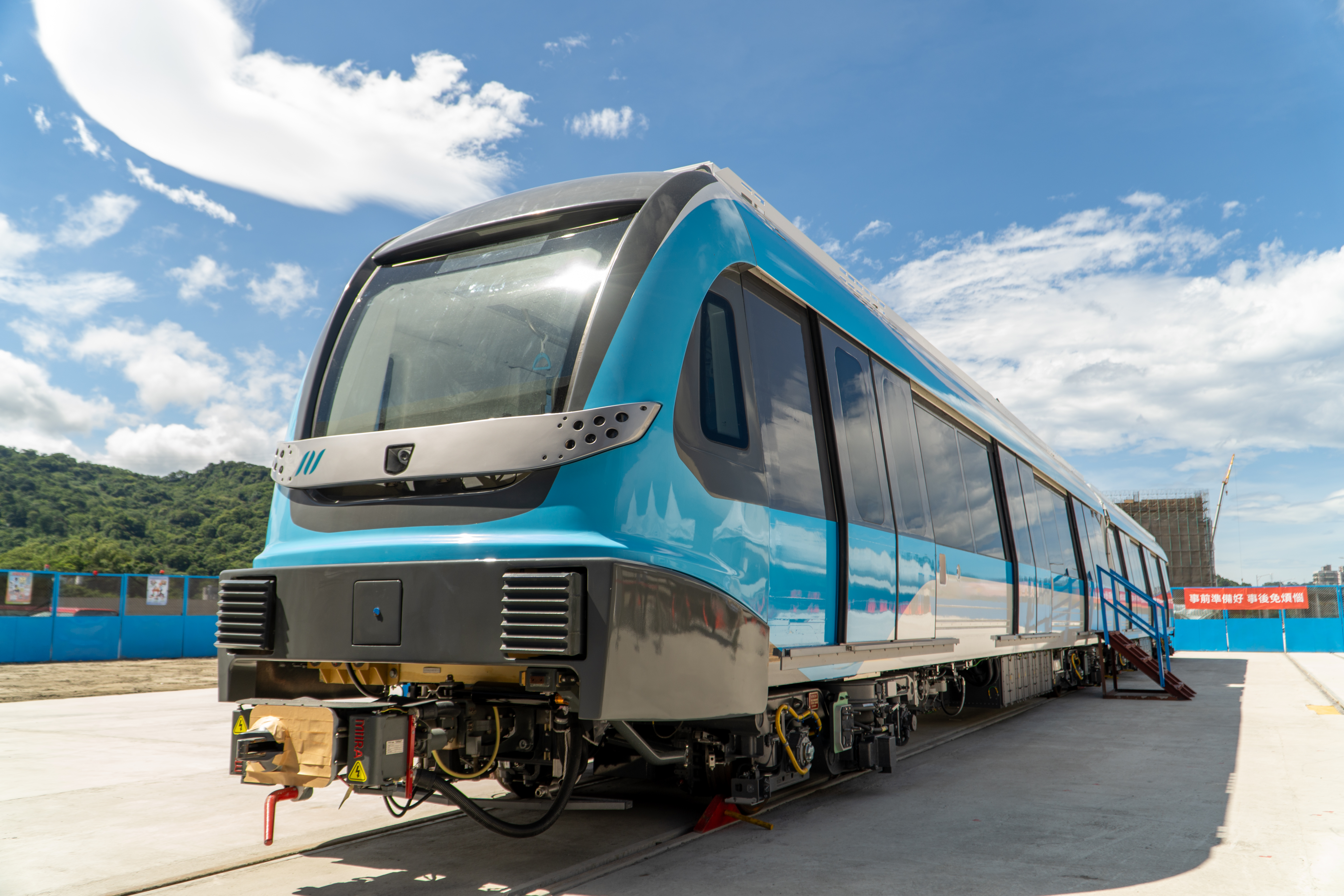
A Sanying Line train

Sanying Line operates 29 sets of two-car medium capacity Hitachi Rail Italy Driverless Metro. These trains were manufactured at Hitachi's Kasado Works plant in Yamaguchi rather than at Hitachi Rail's manufacturing facility in Pistoia.

== See also ==
- Rail transport in Taiwan
- List of railway stations in Taiwan
- Ankeng LRT
- Danhai LRT
