= Yongning metro station =

Metro station in New Taipei, Taiwan

Yongning 永寧
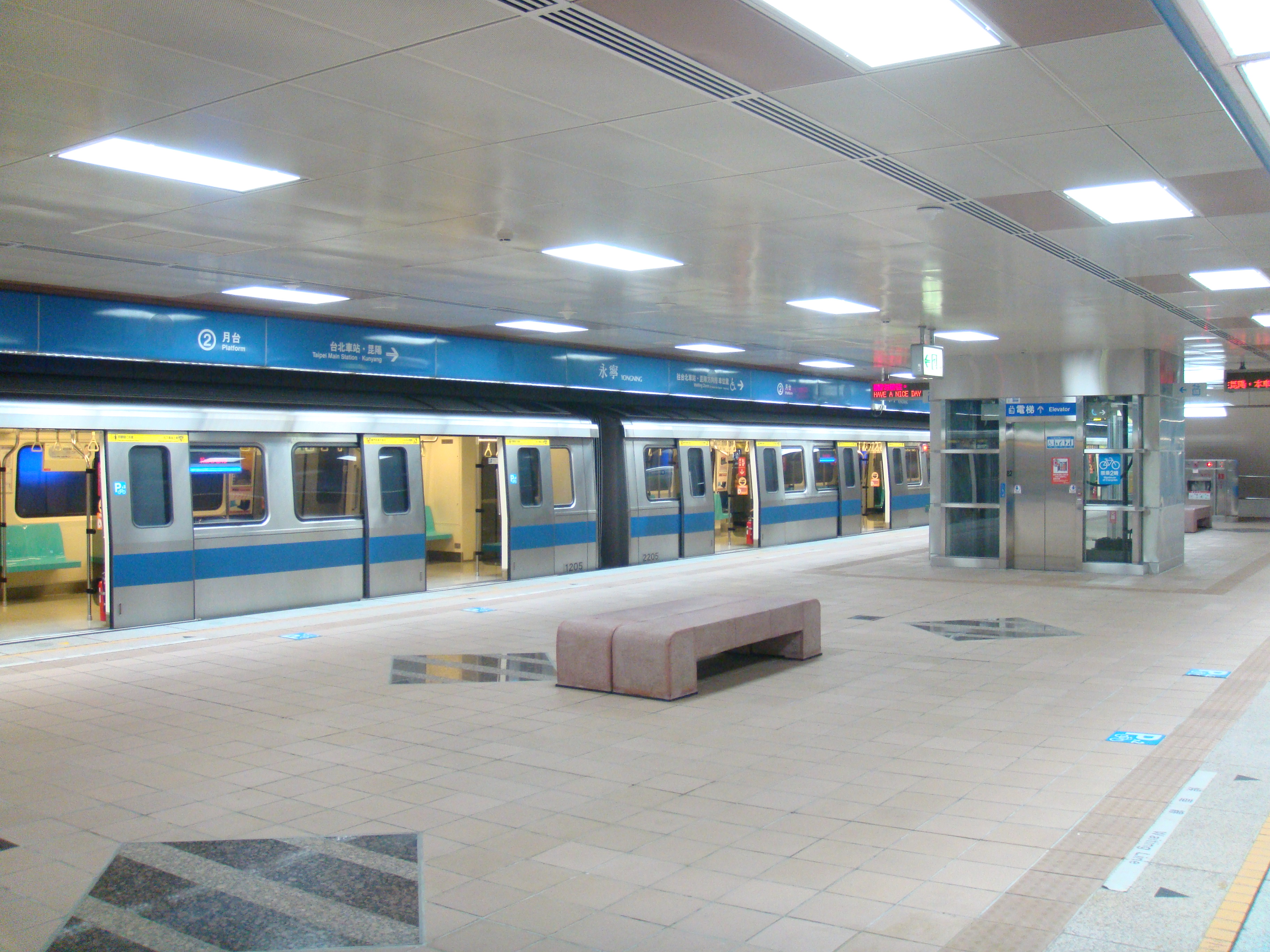
- Yongning station platform

Chinese name
- Traditional Chinese: 永寧
- Simplified Chinese: 永宁
Transcriptions
Standard Mandarin
- Hanyu Pinyin: Yǒngníng
- Bopomofo: ㄩㄥˇ ㄋㄧㄥˊ
Hakka
- Pha̍k-fa-sṳ: Yún-nèn
Southern Min
- Tâi-lô: Íng-lîng

General information
- Location: B1F, No. 105, Sec. 3, Zhongyang Rd. Tucheng, New Taipei, Taiwan
- Coordinates: 24.966597°N 121.436121°E
- Operator: Taipei Metro
- Line: Bannan line (BL02)
- Connections: Wanda-Zhonghe-Shulin line (via LG12 Pitang); Bus stop

Construction
- Structure type: Underground

Other information
- Station code: BL02

History
- Opened: 31 May 2006

Passengers
- daily (December 2024)
- Rank: 67 out of 109

Services
Preceding station	Taipei Metro	Following station
Dingpu Terminus	Bannan line	Tucheng towards Nangang Exhib Center
Location

The Taipei Metro Yongning station is a station of the Bannan line located in Tucheng District, New Taipei City, Taiwan. It served as the southern terminal station before the opening of the Dingpu station in 2015.

== Station layout ==
Street level	Entrance/exit	Entrance/exit
B1	Concourse	Lobby, automatic ticket dispensing machine, information desk, one-way faregates Restrooms (outside fare zone near exit 2 and 3)
B2	Platform 1	← Bannan line towards Nangang Exhib Center (BL03 Tucheng)
B2	Island platform, doors will open on the left
B2	Platform 2	Bannan line towards Dingpu (BL01 Terminus) →

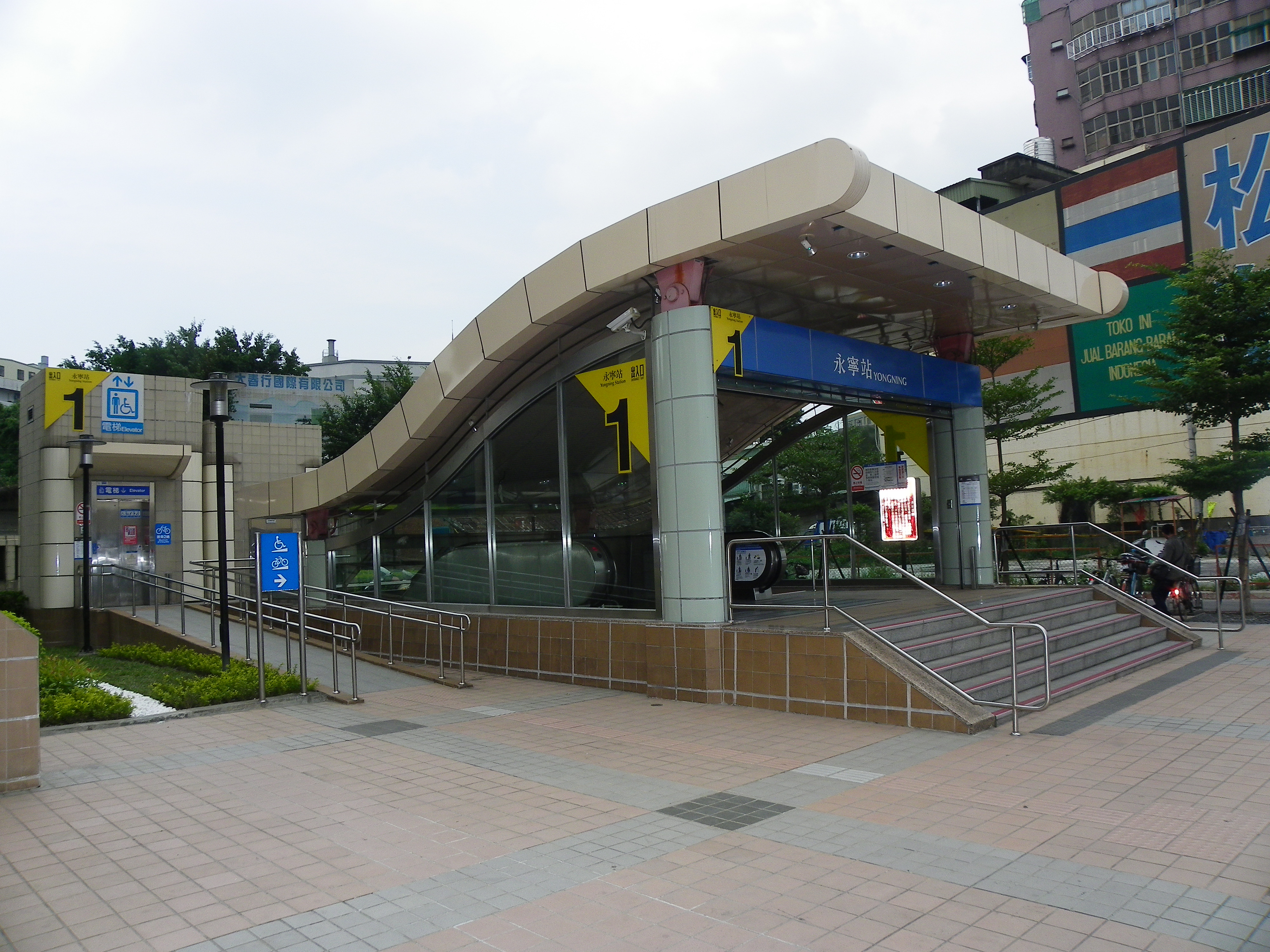
Yongning station exit 1

The two-level, underground station with an island platform and four exits. It is located at the intersection of Zhongyang Rd. and Chengtian Rd.

It will be an out-of-station transfer with the Wanda-Zhonghe-Shulin line in 2028. The station's name could be Pitang.

=== Public Art ===
Exhibits of artifacts from nearby Zhanlong Mountain and Tudigong Mountain, which were discovered close to Yongning station, are on display. The theme for the artifacts is "Time & Debris". The two main pieces are called "The Splinter of Time" and "86400". Both pieces seek to express the sensation of time, with "86400" signifying the number of seconds in a day. It was completed in March 2006 and cost NT$4,000,000.

=== Exits ===
- Exit 1: Intersection of Lane 98, Zhongyang Rd. Sec. 3 and Chengtian Rd.
- Exit 2: Beside the parking lot which is located on the intersection of Zhongyang Rd. Sec. 3 and Chengtian Rd.
- Exit 3: East side of Zhongyang Rd. Sec. 3, adjacent to Lane 69
- Exit 4: West side of Zhongyang Rd. Sec. 3, beside Lane 76

== Around the station ==
Museums

- Taiwan Nougat Creativity Museum

Highways

- National Highway No. 3
- Provincial Highway 3

Parks

- Tonghua Park

Shopping malls

- RT-Mart Tucheng Store

Temples

- Chengtianchan Temple

Schools

- Tucheng Junior High School

Banks and other companies

- Taiwan Textile Research Institute
- Hua Nan Commercial Bank, Ltd. (between this station and Tucheng station)

Industrial parks

- Tucheng Industrial District
