= Bannan Line =

MRT route in Taipei, Taiwan

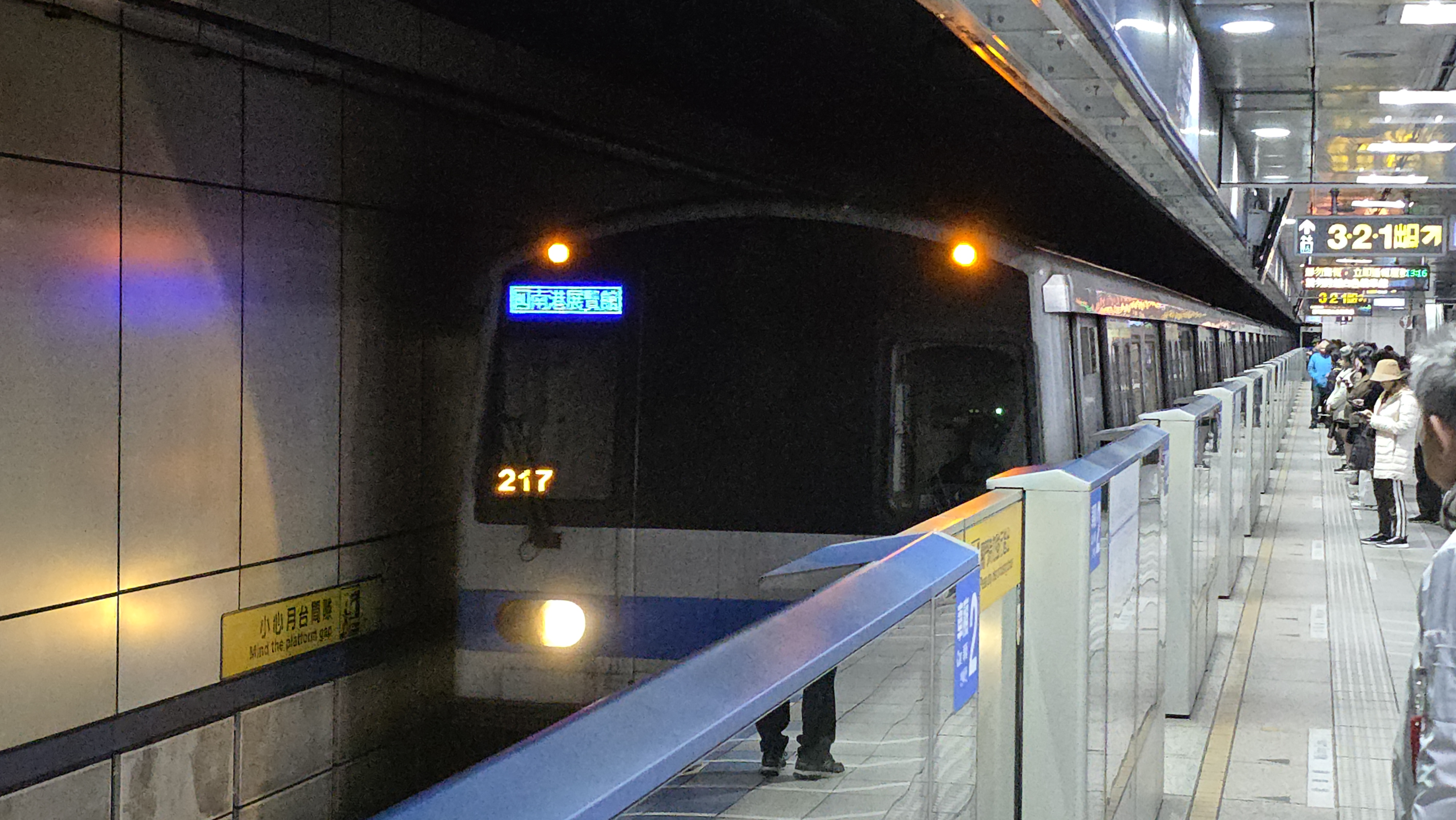
- C321 train bound for Nangang Exhib. Center at Far Eastern Hospital station

Overview
- Other name: Blue Line
- Native name: 板南線
- Status: In service
- Owner: Taipei DORTS
- Line number: BL
- Locale: Taipei and New Taipei, Taiwan
- Termini: Dingpu; Taipei Nangang Exhibition Center
- Stations: 23
- Color on map: Blue

Service
- Type: Rapid transit
- System: Taipei Metro
- Services: Dingpu–Nangang Exhib. Center (full); Far Eastern Hospital–Kunyang (short-turn)
- Operator: Taipei Rapid Transit Corporation
- Depots: Nangang; Tucheng
- Rolling stock: C321; C341; C381

History
- Opened: 24 December 1999; 26 years ago
- Last extension: 2015

Technical
- Line length: 26.6 km (16.5 mi)
- Num of tracks: 2
- Character: Underground
- Track gauge: 1,435 mm (4 ft 8 1/2 in) standard gauge
- Electrification: 750 V DC third rail
- Operating speed: 80 km/h (50 mph)

Bannan Line
- Traditional Chinese: 板南線
- Simplified Chinese: 板南线
Transcriptions
Standard Mandarin
- Hanyu Pinyin: Bǎnnán Xiàn

Banqiao–Nangang line
- Traditional Chinese: 板橋南港線
- Simplified Chinese: 板桥南港线
Transcriptions
Standard Mandarin
- Hanyu Pinyin: Bǎnqiáo Nángǎng Xiàn

Blue Line
- Traditional Chinese: 藍線
- Simplified Chinese: 蓝线
Transcriptions
Standard Mandarin
- Hanyu Pinyin: Lán Xiàn
- Wade–Giles: Lan^{2}Hsien^{4}
- Tongyong Pinyin: Lán Siàn
Hakka
- Pha̍k-fa-sṳ: Làm Sien
Southern Min
- Tâi-lô: Nâ Soàⁿ

The Bannan Line (Chinese: 板南線), also known as the Blue Line (Chinese: 藍線), is a metro line of Taipei Metro in Taipei, Taiwan, with a total of 23 stations serving the districts of Nangang, Xinyi, Daan, Zhongshan, Wanhua, Banqiao and Tucheng. The line's name is a portmanteau of "Banqiao" and "Nangang".

The entire line runs underground. The excavation of tunnels using the cut-and-cover method resulted in large scale detouring of road traffic. Because of that, the line runs beneath existing roads and totals 28.3 km (17.6 mi).

== Overview ==
Service on this line is divided into a full-length service from Taipei Nangang Exhibition Center to Dingpu, as well as a shorter service from Kunyang to Far Eastern Hospital.

Due to Taipei City Hall being at the centre of the Taipei 101 New Year's festivities, intervals between trains can be reduced to a minimum of 135 seconds, transporting up to 39,000 passengers per hour. This results in an average of about 27 trains per hour on the line during peak hours.

== History ==
- 8 November 1990: The Nangang section begins construction.
- 30 December 1991: The Taipei Main Station western underground passageway opens.
- 24 December 1993: Nangang section construction at the intersection of Zhongxiao East Rd and Shaoxing Rd caves in, causes traffic jams.
- 30 October 1998: Construction is completed on the tunnel between Kunyang and Houshanpi.
- 17 September 2001: Typhoon Nari floods many stations, rendering them nonoperational.
- 29 November 2001: Taipei Main Station re-opens for service.
- 30 December 2003: The Nangang section eastern extension to Nangang begins construction.
- 17 November 2004: The Nangang section eastern extension to Taipei Nangang Exhibition Center begins construction.
- 21 May 2014: The 2014 Taipei Metro attack occurs between Longshan Temple and Jiangzicui when 21-year-old university student Cheng Chieh attacks passengers with a knife, leading to 4 deaths and 24 injuries.
- 28 September 2018: Half-height platform edge doors are installed in Tucheng, making all stations on this line and the entire Taipei Metro system have some form of platform doors.

=== Stations ===
Bannan Line stations timeline
Date	Description	Remarks
24 December 1999	Taipei City Hall to Longshan Temple	Revenue service
31 August 2000	Longshan Temple to Xinpu	Revenue service
30 December 2000	Kunyang to Taipei City Hall	Revenue service
27 May 2006	Banqiao to Tucheng	Trial service
31 May 2006	Xinpu to Yongning	Revenue service
16 May 2008	Taipei Main Station to Nangang	Trial service
25 December 2008	Taipei Main Station to Nangang	Revenue service
27 February 2011	Nangang to Taipei Nangang Exhibition Center	Revenue service
6 July 2015	Yongning to Dingpu	Revenue service

== Services ==
As of December 2017, the typical off-peak service is:

- 8 trains per hour between Far Eastern Hospital and Kunyang
- 7 trains per hour between Dingpu and Taipei Nangang Exhibition Center

== Stations ==
Code	Station name	Station type		Locale		Sta. distance (km)		Opened date	Transfer
Code	Station name	Structure	Platform	Locale		Previous	Total	Opened date	Transfer
Bannan Line
BL01	Dingpu 頂埔	Underground	Island	Tucheng	New Taipei	—N/a	0.00	2015-7-6	Sanying Line
BL02	Yongning 永寧	Underground	Island	Tucheng	New Taipei	1.95	1.95	2006-5-31	—N/a
BL03	Tucheng 土城	Underground	Island	Tucheng	New Taipei	1.11	3.06	2006-5-31	Wanda–Shulin Line
BL04	Haishan 海山	Underground	Island	Tucheng	New Taipei	1.47	4.53	2006-5-31	—N/a
BL05	Far Eastern Hospital 亞東醫院	Underground	Island	Banqiao	New Taipei	1.64	6.17	2006-5-31	Wugu-Taishan LRT
BL06	Fuzhong 府中	Underground	Split	Banqiao	New Taipei	1.45	7.45	2006-5-31	—N/a
BL07	Banqiao 板橋	Underground	Island	Banqiao	New Taipei	0.65	8.10	2006-5-31	Circular Line; Western Trunk line Taiwan High Speed Rail
BL08	Xinpu 新埔	Underground	Island	Banqiao	New Taipei	1.28	9.38	2000-8-31	Circular Line (Y17)
BL09	Jiangzicui 江子翠	Underground	Island	Banqiao	New Taipei	0.87	10.25	2000-8-31	—N/a
BL10	Longshan Temple 龍山寺	Underground	Island	Wanhua	Taipei	3.08	13.33	1999-12-24	—N/a
BL11	Ximen 西門	Underground	Island/split	Zhongzheng	Taipei	1.31	14.64	1999-12-24	Songshan–Xindian Line
BL12	Taipei Main Station 台北車站	Underground	Island	Zhongzheng	Taipei	1.35	15.99	1999-12-24	Tamsui–Xinyi Line; Western Trunk line Taiwan High Speed Rail; Taoyuan Airport MRT (A1)
BL13	Shandao Temple 善導寺	Underground	Island	Zhongzheng	Taipei	0.68	16.67	1999-12-24	—N/a
BL14	Zhongxiao Xinsheng 忠孝新生	Underground	Island	Zhongzheng	Taipei	0.94	17.61	1999-12-24	Zhonghe–Xinlu Line
BL15	Zhongxiao Fuxing 忠孝復興	Underground	Island	Daan	Taipei	1.12	18.73	1999-12-24	Wenhu Line
BL16	Zhongxiao Dunhua 忠孝敦化	Underground	Island	Daan	Taipei	0.67	19.40	1999-12-24	—N/a
BL17	Sun Yat-sen Memorial Hall 國父紀念館	Underground	Island	Xinyi	Taipei	0.73	20.13	1999-12-24	Zhonghe-Guangfu Line
BL18	Taipei City Hall 市政府	Underground	Island	Xinyi	Taipei	0.84	20.97	1999-12-24	—N/a
BL19	Yongchun 永春	Underground	Island	Xinyi	Taipei	0.99	21.96	2000-12-30	Circular Line
BL20	Houshanpi 後山埤	Underground	Island	Nangang	Taipei	0.82	22.78	2000-12-30	—N/a
BL21	Kunyang 昆陽	Underground	Island	Nangang	Taipei	1.36	24.14	2000-12-30	—N/a
BL22	Nangang 南港	Underground	Island	Nangang	Taipei	1.42	25.56	2008-12-25	Keelung MRT; Western Trunk line Taiwan High Speed Rail
BL23	Taipei Nangang Exhibition Center 南港展覽館	Underground	Island	Nangang	Taipei	1.09	26.65	2011-2-27	Wenhu Line; Keelung MRT
