= Tucheng District =

District in New Taipei, Taiwan

Tucheng 土城區 Dojō
- District
- Tucheng District
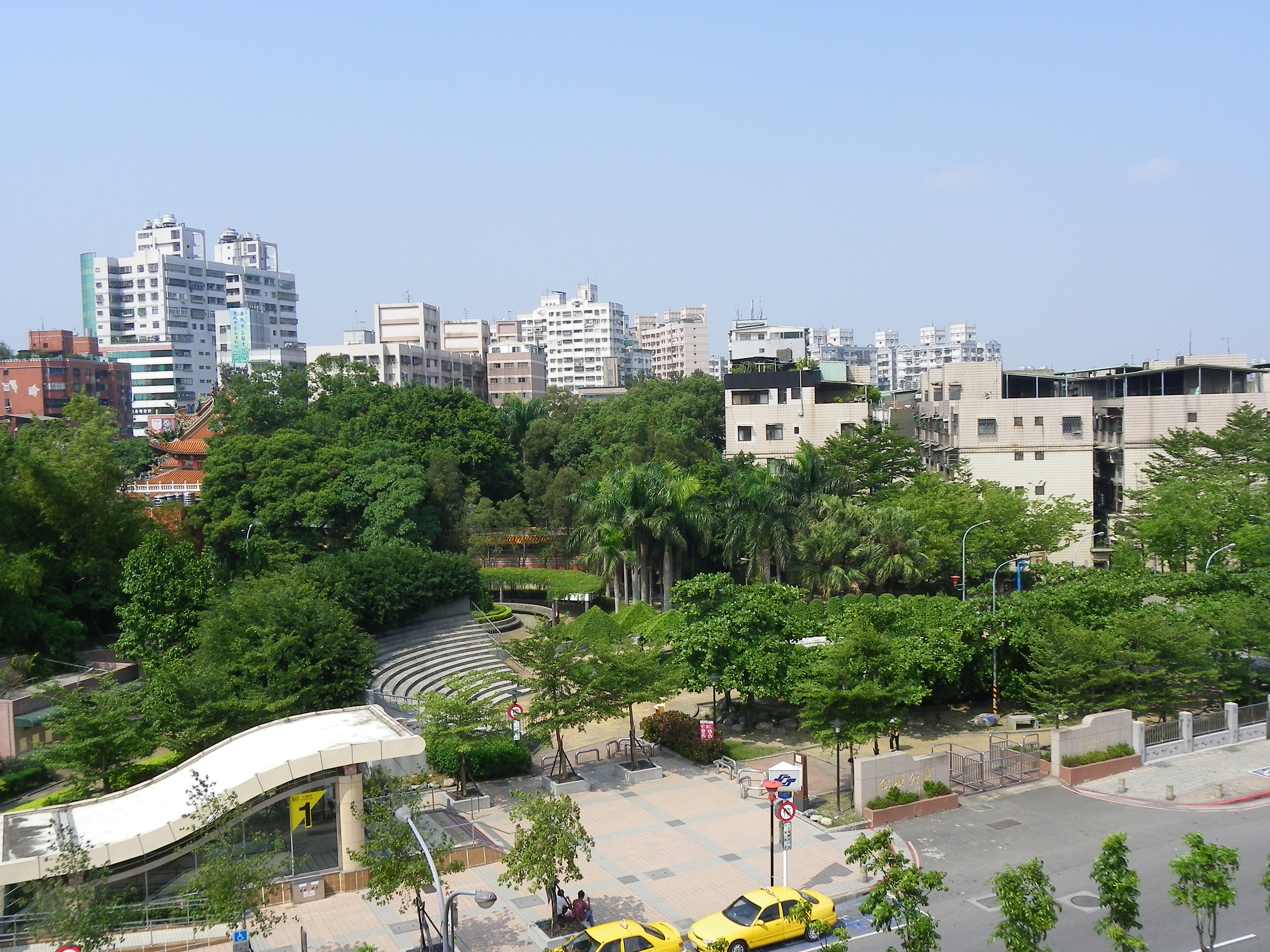

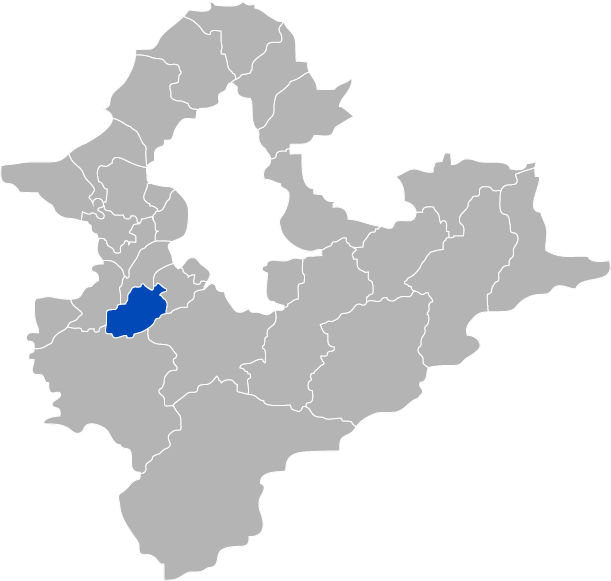
- Location in New Taipei City
- Coordinates: 024°58′N 121°25′E
- Country: Taiwan
- Special municipality: New Taipei City

Area
  - Total: 29.56 km^{2} (11.41 sq mi)

Population (February 2023)
  - Total: 238,250
- Time zone: +8
- Website: www.tucheng.ntpc.gov.tw (in Chinese)

Tucheng District (Chinese: 土城區; pinyin: Tǔchéng Qū; Pe̍h-ōe-jī: Thô͘-siâⁿ-khu) is a district in the southwestern part of New Taipei City, Taiwan.

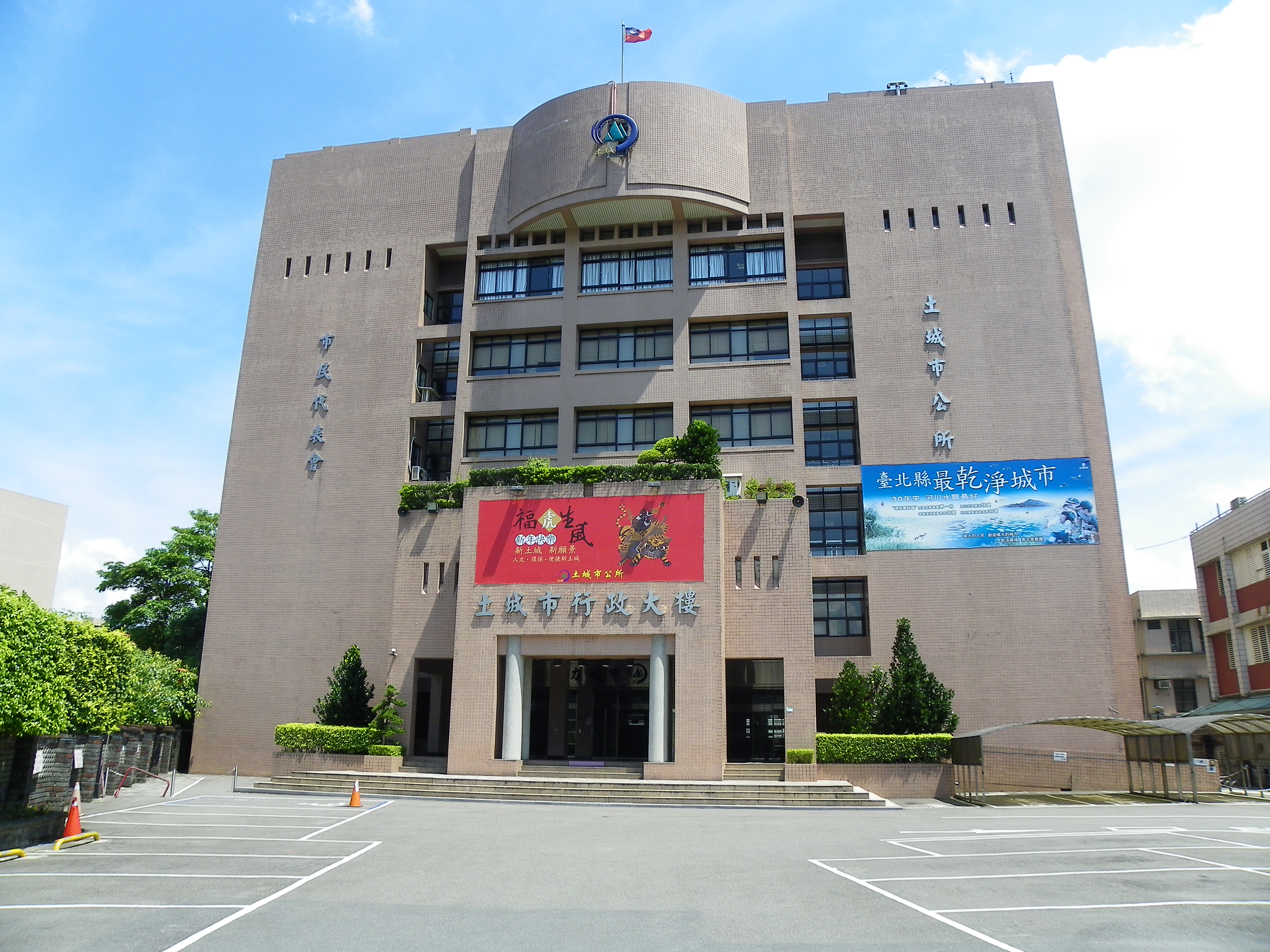
Tucheng District Office

== History ==
On 26 June 1993, Tucheng was upgraded from rural township to a county-administered city within Taipei County. On 25 December 2010, Taipei County was upgraded to New Taipei special municipality and Tucheng became a district.

== Education ==
- HungKuo Delin University of Technology
- New Taipei Industrial Vocational High School

== Tourist attractions ==
- Taiwan Nougat Creativity Museum
- Tucheng Tung Blossom Park
- Lin Family Garden
- FE21 Mall
- Cape No. 7 shooting scene
- Tianshang Mountain Recreation Area: Tianshang Mountain raises to a height of 429.7 m. Originally named Neipo Mountain, this steep distinctive peak has been carved by the Xindian and Heng Rivers. Also known as 'Imperial' Mountain, it provides a scenic view.
- Chengtian Chan Temple: The Buddhist Chengtian Temple is located on Qingyuan Mountain east of Tucheng. It is a popular pilgrimage destination on weekends. A shady access path to the temple features an array of old stone tablets.
- Tucheng Riverside Park
- Paulownia Park

== Transportation ==
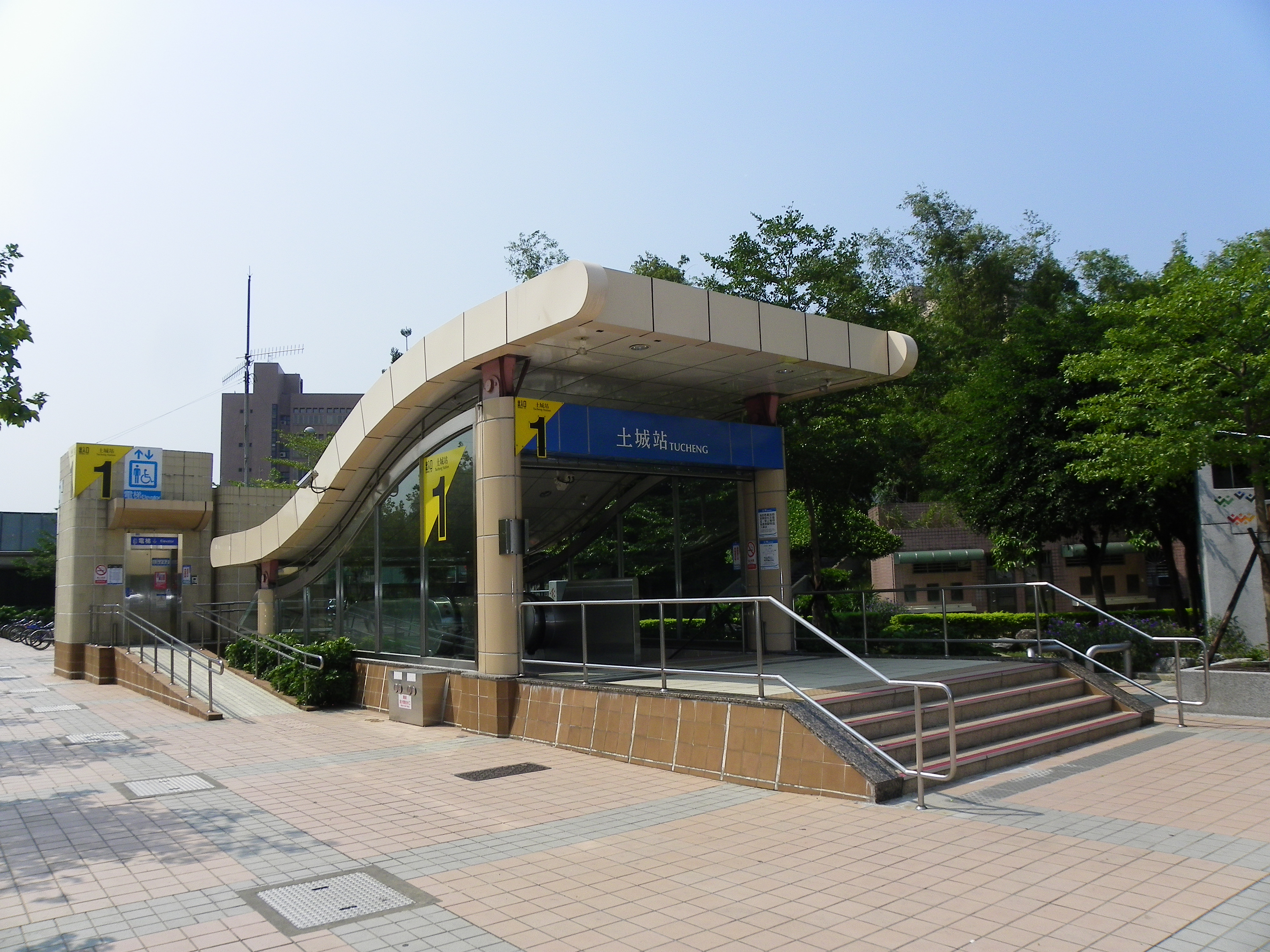
Tucheng Station

- National Highway No. 3
- Provincial Highway No. 3
- Taipei Metro: Bannan line (Blue) Line [Haishan, Tucheng, Yongning, and Dingpu stations]
- New Taipei Metro: Sanying line - Dingpu and Mazutian metro stations

== See also ==
- New Taipei City
