= Dingpu metro station =

Metro station in New Taipei, Taiwan

Dingpu / LB01 頂埔

Chinese name
- Traditional Chinese: 頂埔
- Simplified Chinese: 顶埔
Transcriptions
Standard Mandarin
- Hanyu Pinyin: Dǐngpǔ
- Bopomofo: ㄉㄧㄥˇㄆㄨˇ
- Wade–Giles: Ting³-p'u³
Hakka
- Pha̍k-fa-sṳ: Táng-phû
Southern Min
- Tâi-lô: Tíng-poo

General information
- Location: 51 Sec. 4, Zhongyang Rd. Tucheng, New Taipei; Taiwan
- Coordinates: 24.9597°N 121.4195°E
- System: Taipei Metro; New Taipei Metro
- Owner: Taipei DORTS; New Taipei DORTS
- Operator: Taipei Rapid Transit Corporation; New Taipei Metro Corporation
- Lines: Bannan Line; Sanying Line
- Platforms: 4 (1 island platform and 2 side platforms)
- Tracks: 4

Construction
- Structure type: Underground (Bannan line); Elevated (Sanying line)
- Cycle facilities: Yes
- Accessible: Yes

Other information
- Station code: / LB01

History
- Opened: 6 July 2015

Passengers
- daily (December 2024)
- Rank: Undetermined

Services
Preceding station	Taipei Metro	Following station
Terminus	Bannan Line	Yongning towards Nangang Exhib Center
Preceding station	New Taipei Metro	Following station
Terminus	Sanying Line	Mazutian towards Yingtao Fude
Location

Dingpu station (Chinese: 頂埔站) is a metro station of Taipei Metro and New Taipei Metro in Tucheng District, New Taipei City. This station is the western terminus of the Bannan line and the eastern terminus of the Sanying line.

Construction began in January 2010 and service commenced on 6 July 2015. Sanying line opened for service on June 30, 2026.

== Station layout ==
The four-level, underground station with island platforms. It is 292 meters in length and 21 meters in width, and it has adopted the cut-and-cover method for construction. Four exits are built. It is located beneath Lane 118 and 52 on Zhongyang Rd.

It is currently the southernmost station in the Taipei Metro. It is a transfer station with the Sanying Line (as an elevated station).

=== Levels ===
4F	Connecting level	Overpass
3F	Sanying line concourse	Information desk, ticket machines, restrooms
3F	Side platform, doors will open on the right
3F	Platform 2	Sanying Line termination platform (no carrying passengers)
3F	Platform 1	Sanying line towards Yingtao Fude (LB02 Mazutian) →
3F	Side platform, doors will open on the right
2F	Passageway for Sanying line
1F	Street level	Exits, mezzanine of transfer passage
B1	Mezzanine of transfer passage
B2	Underground parking lot
B3	Bannan line concourse	Information desk, ticket machines, restrooms, lockers
B4	Platform 1	← Bannan Line towards Taipei Nangang Exhibition Center (BL02 Yongning)
B4	Island platform, doors will open on the left / right
B4		← Bannan line towards Taipei Nangang Exhibition Center (BL02 Yongning)

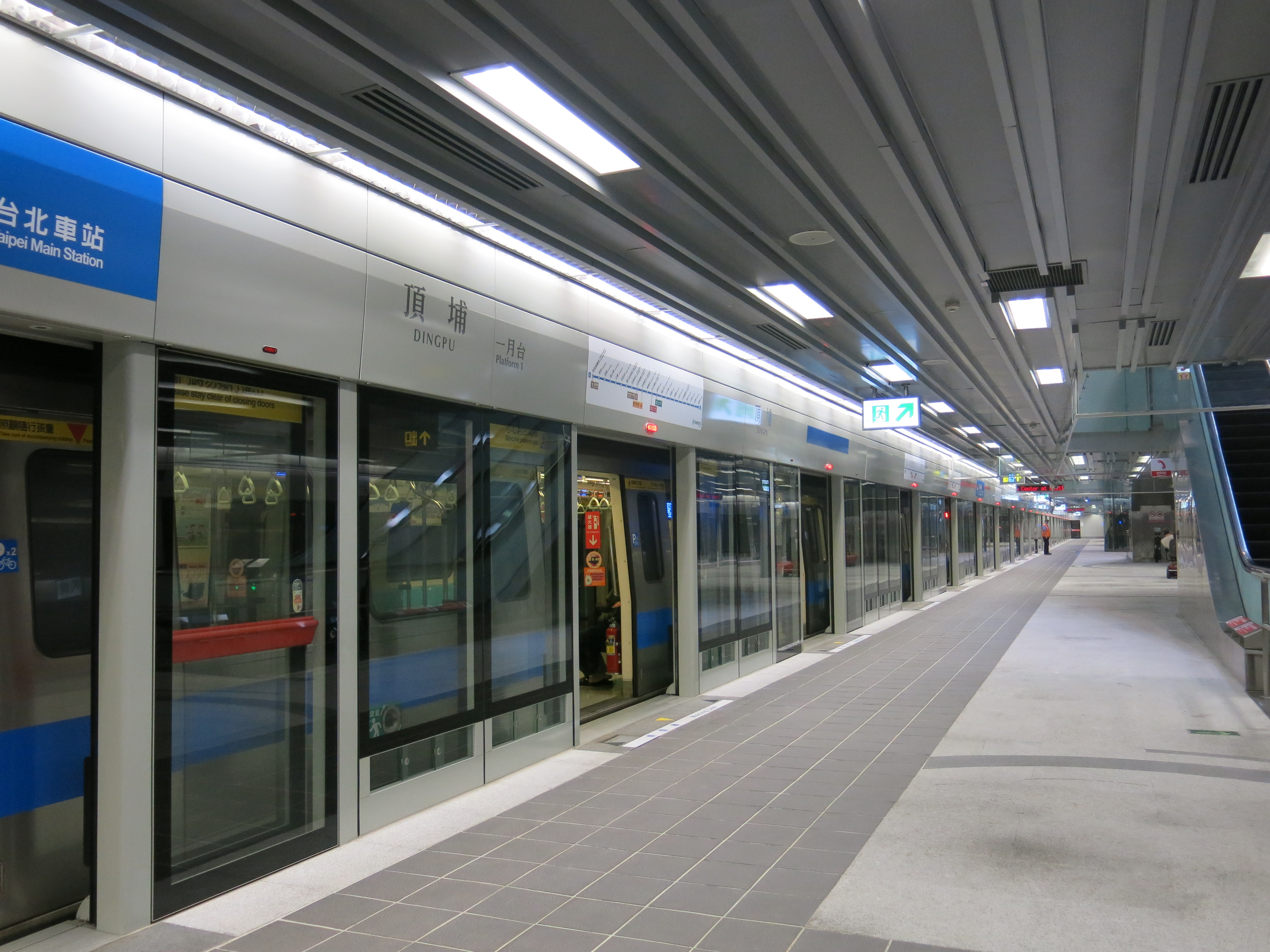
Platform of Bannan line

Platform of Sanying line

=== Exits ===
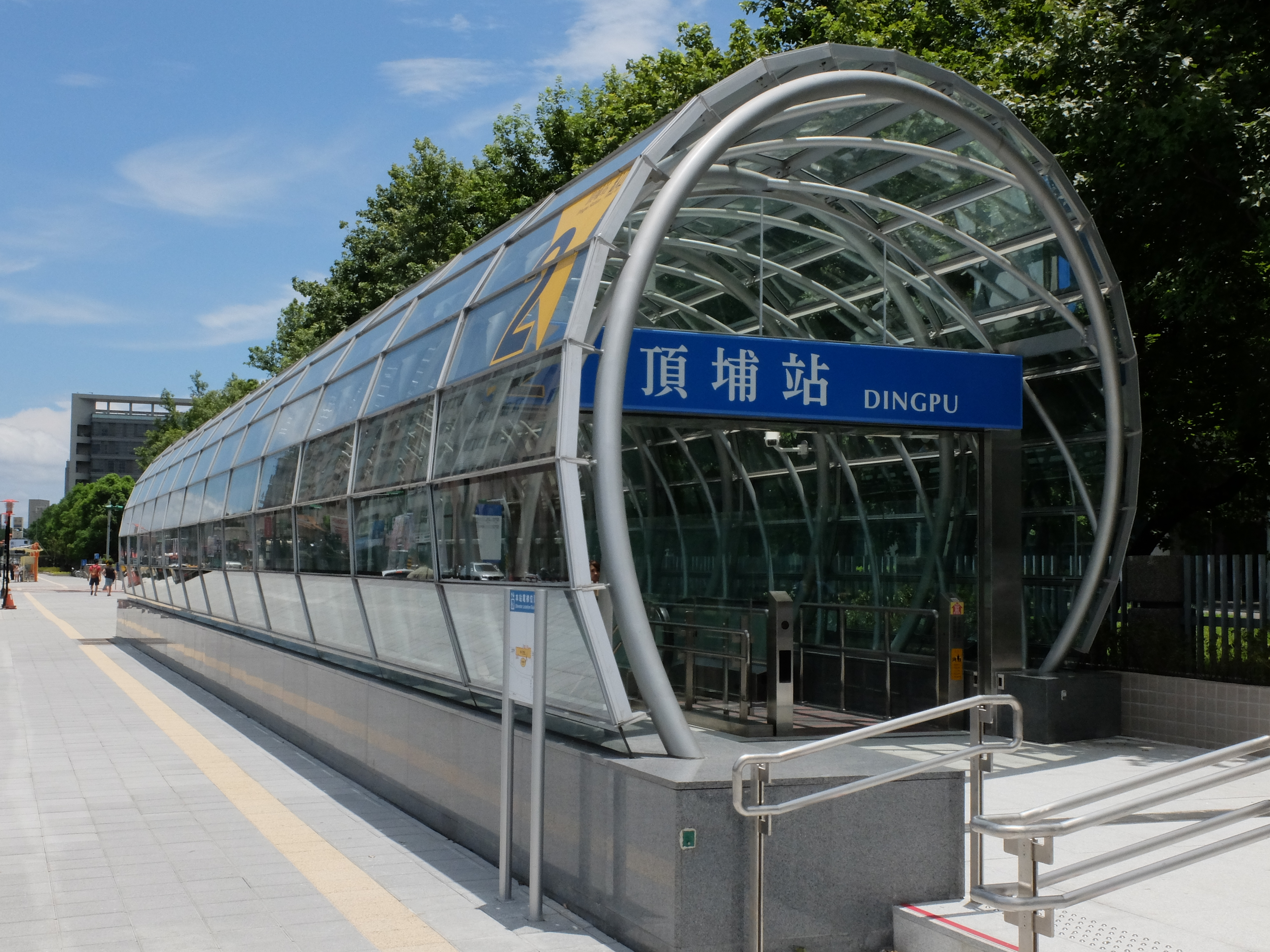
Exit 2

- Exit 1: Dingpu St. (頂埔街)
- Exit 2: Yongfu Temple (永福岩祖師廟)
- Exit 3: Danuan Rd. (大暖路)
- Exit 4: Sanmin Rd. (三民路)

=== Design ===
The station design takes into account Tucheng's early coal industry (Haishan Coal Mine area), Army Logistics School, high-tech carbon nanotubes, and ceramics made in Yingge.

== History ==
The station was expected to be completed in December 2014 but instead was completed in May 2014. It was also expected to open for revenue service in June 2015, but this was pushed back to July 2015. It takes 30 minutes to travel from Dingpu station to Taipei Main Station.
