= Taipei Nangang Exhibition Center metro station =

Metro station in Taipei, Taiwan

Taipei Nangang Exhibition Center / 南港展覽館
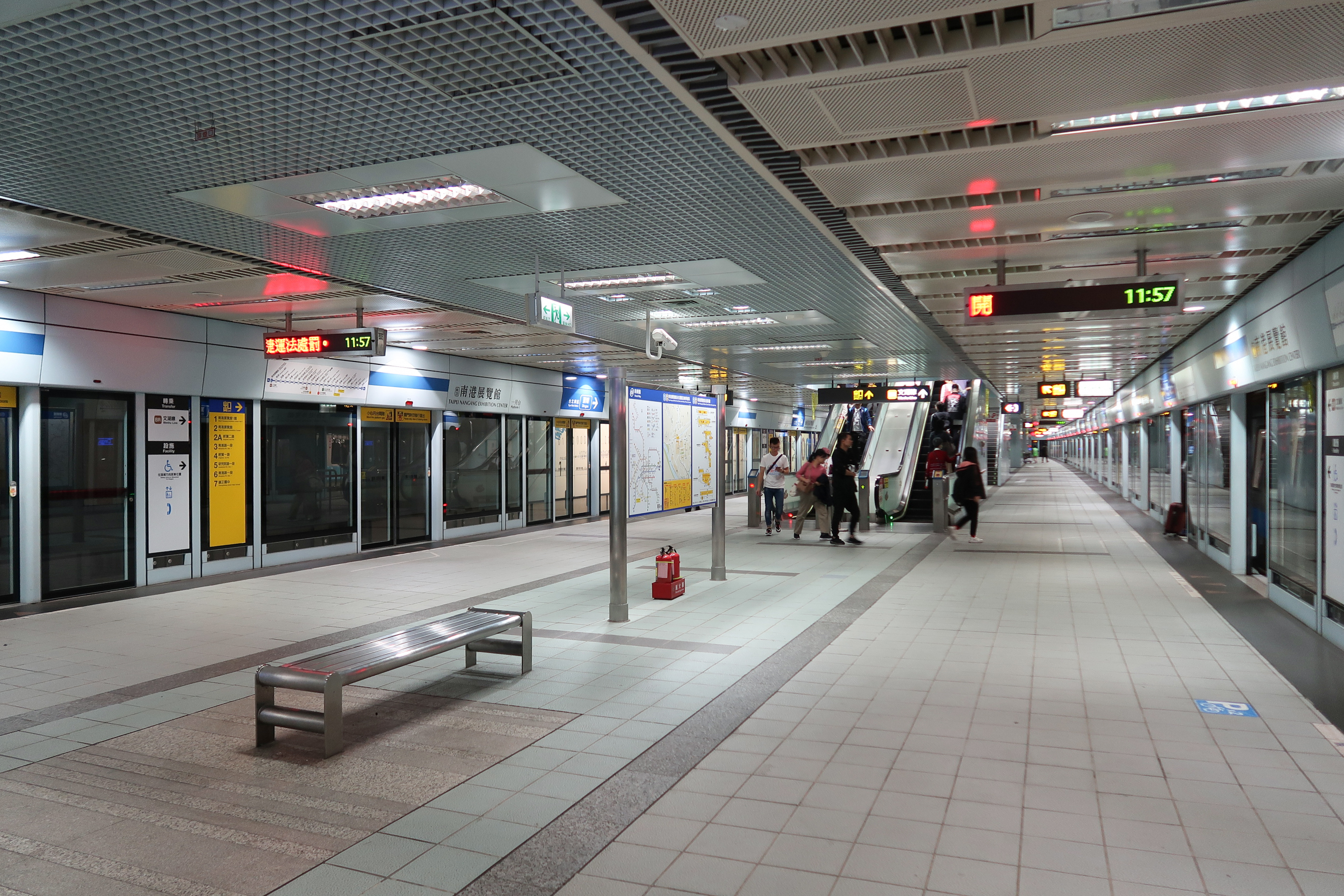
- Blue Line Platform

Chinese name
- Traditional Chinese: 南港展覽館
- Simplified Chinese: 南港展览馆
Transcriptions
Standard Mandarin
- Hanyu Pinyin: Nángǎng Zhǎnlǎnguǎn
- Bopomofo: ㄋㄢˊ ㄍㄤˇ ㄓㄢˇ ㄌㄢˇ ㄍㄨㄢˇ
Hakka
- Pha̍k-fa-sṳ: Nàm-kóng Chán-lam-kón
Southern Min
- Tâi-lô: Lâm-káng Tiān-lám-kuán

General information
- Location: 32 Sec 1 Nangang Rd; Nangang District, Taipei (BR); Taiwan
- Coordinates: 25.0554°N 121.6179°E
- System: Taipei metro station

Construction
- Structure type: Elevated (BR); Underground (BL)
- Cycle facilities: Access available (BL)

Other information
- Station code: BL23 BR24
- Website: web.metro.taipei/e/stationdetail2010.asp?ID=BL23+BR24-031

History
- Opened: July 4, 2009

Key dates
- 2011-02-27: Bannan line added

Passengers
- 2017: 19.557 million per year ▼0.85%
- Rank: (Ranked 19 of 119)

Services
Preceding station	Taipei Metro	Following station
Nangang Software Park towards Taipei Zoo	Wenhu line	Terminus
Nangang towards Dingpu	Bannan line	Terminus
Location

Taipei Nangang Exhibition Center station (Chinese: 南港展覽館站; pinyin: Nángǎng zhǎnlǎnguǎn zhàn) is a metro station in Taipei, Taiwan served by Taipei Metro. It is a terminal station on both Wenhu line and Bannan line, and serves the Nangang, Neihu, and Xizhi districts.

== Station overview ==
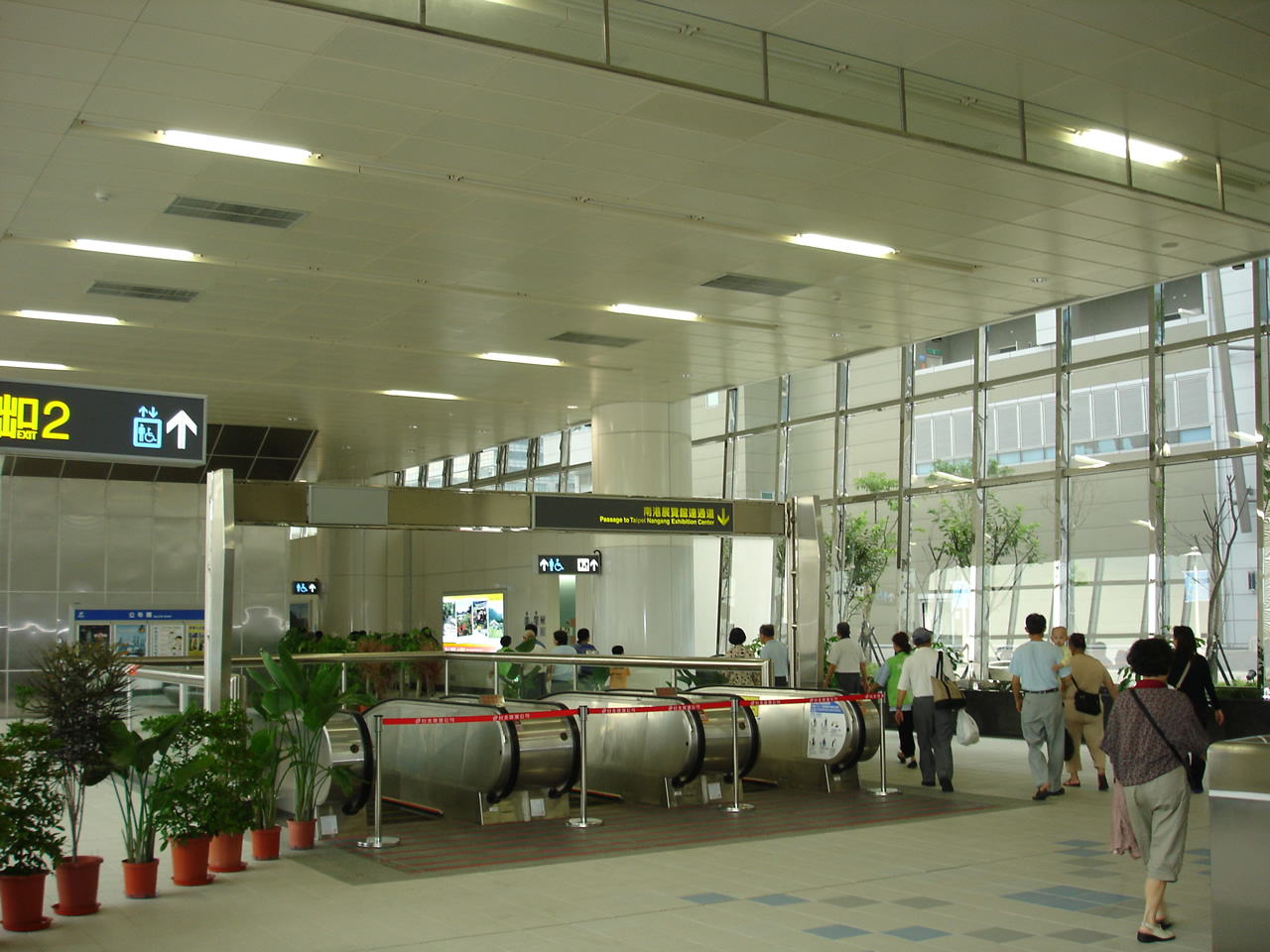
Inside the Taipei Nangang Exhibition Center station (elevated level)

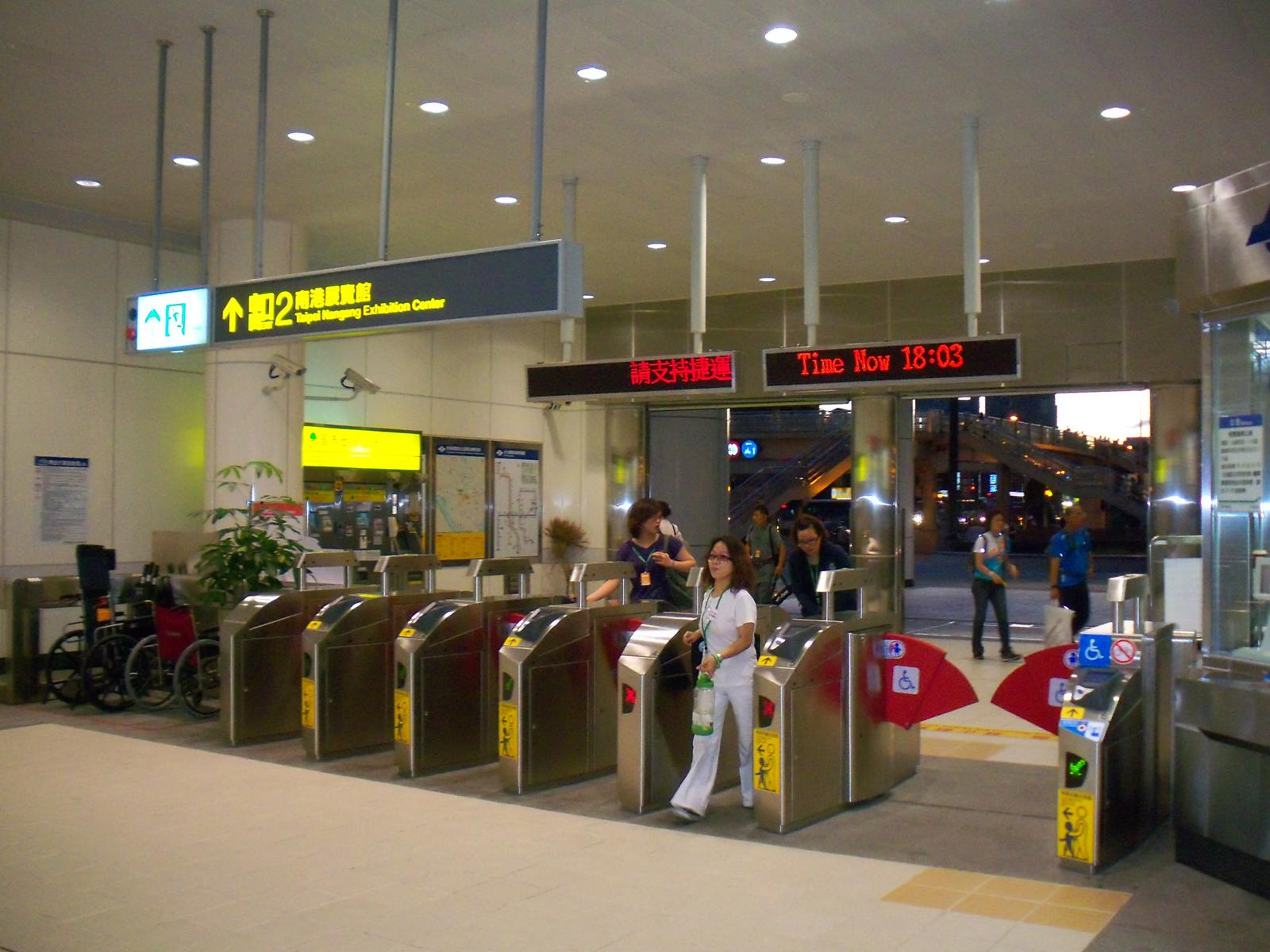
Taipei Nangang Exhibition Center station entrance

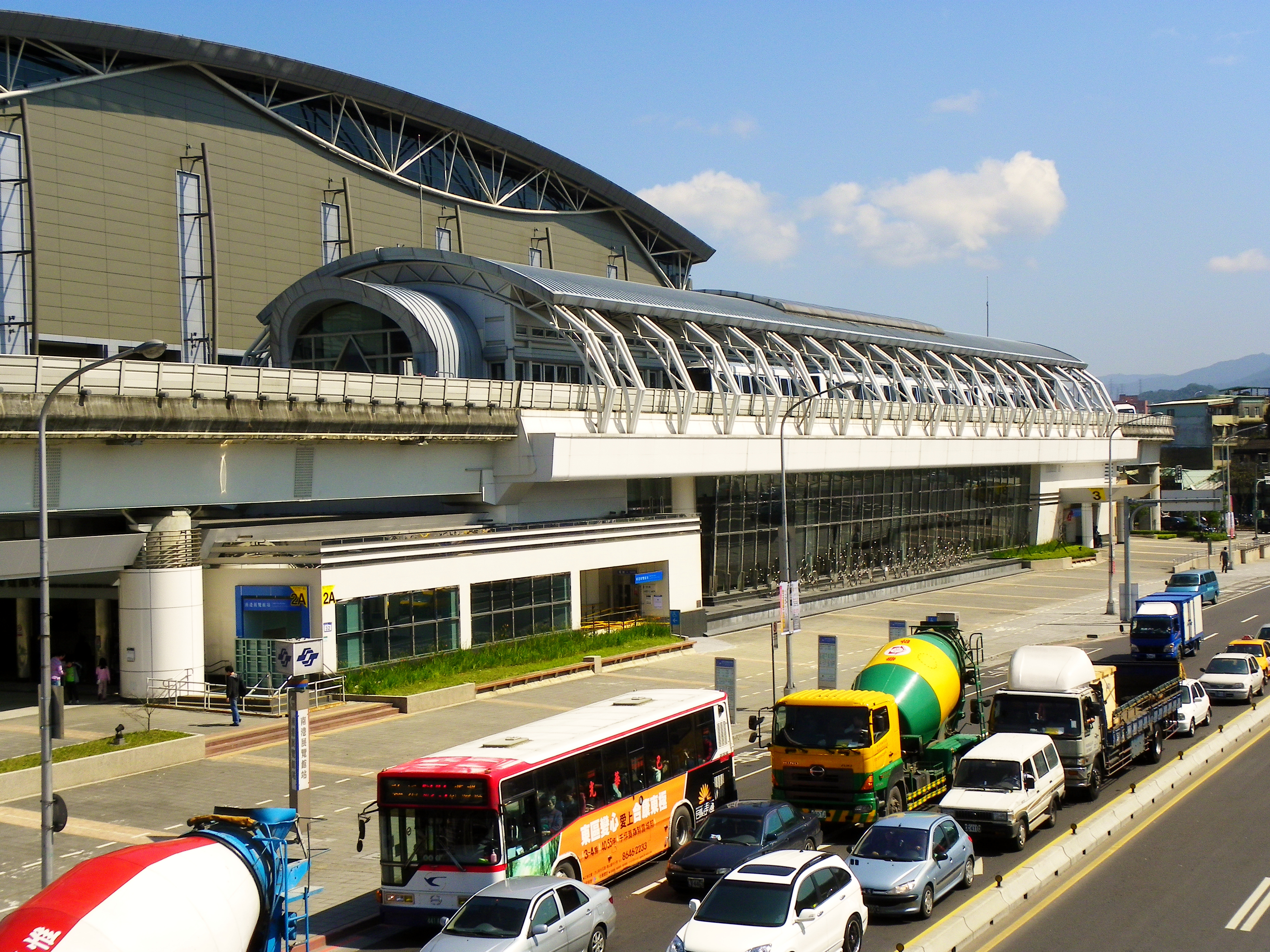
Exterior

This is a three-level station, divided into an elevated and underground portion, each serving different lines. The elevated portion of the station serving the medium-capacity Wenhu line features an island platform and a platform elevator located on the west side of the concourse level. The station is 125 m (410 ft) long and 26 m (85 ft) wide, while the elevated platform is 93 m (305 ft) long. It is equipped with platform screen doors.

The station is a two-level, underground station high-capacity, and is also equipped with platform screen doors. It has an island platform and is 128 m (420 ft) long and 18.5 m (61 ft) meters wide. The station (serving the Blue Line eastern extension) passes through tunnels belonging to the Taiwan Railways Administration and Taiwan High Speed Rail before terminating at this station. The station is expected to serve as a transfer station for around 200,000 commuters per month. Preliminary inspections began on 9 January 2011, and the extension opened on 27 February 2011. The opening of the station is responsible for increasing the system's ridership by over 16,000 passengers per day.

Before Blue Line portion of the station was completed, the station already served as a transfer station via a free shuttle bus to Nangang Station. The shuttle bus service came to an end with the opening of Blue Line platform.

=== Public art ===
As one of the stations chosen for public art projects on the Neihu Line, the station design and artwork reflect the development of the adjacent business park. The design theme of the station is "Light and Shadow". The roof of the platform utilizes a large-span truss space and the sides of the platform use ripples to reflect sunlight. Public art consists of three pieces: "Fleeting Light", "Flying Shadow", and "River in the Sky". "Fleeting Light" uses images of flowing water to decorate the entrance columns, "Flying Shadow" is located outside the curtain wall, and "River in the Sky" (above the Neihu Line platform) shows the flickers of flowing water.

The Nangang Line concourse features a piece called "Our Personal Public Art" featuring LCD screen displaying images of chronicling the development of human civilization. In the underground passageway, another piece titled "Fast and Slow" has anodized aluminum panels and light panels controlled by motion sensors.

== History ==
The station was initially named Nangang Business Park South, but later changed to its current name.

Construction of the Taipei Nangang Exhibition Center station begins on 16 June 2003; and completed on 28 February 2009 for the Neihu Line, before opening on 4 July 2009.

Taipei Mayor Hau Lung-pin made a special inspection visit to the station to assess construction of the Bannan Line extension on 3 December 2010. Heat, ventilation, and air-conditioning (HVAC) systems had been completed, along with tunneling and trackwork. Stability testing of the electrical and mechanical systems were still ongoing.

The station passed preliminary inspections on 9 January 2011 before opening on 27 February 2011. The second and third phase inspections occurred in the following weeks. Although the extension opened at 2 PM, by 6 PM over 1.1 million people had used the entire system, a 229,000 passenger increase from the same period the previous week.

== Station layout ==
3F	Platform 1	← Wenhu line terminate platform (not carry passengers)
3F	Island platform, doors will open on the left
3F	Platform 2	→ Wenhu line toward Taipei Zoo (BR23 Nangang Software Park) →
2F	Connecting level	Air conditioning facilities and machinery
1F	Street level	Exit to Taipei Nangang Exhibition Center, lobby, information desk automatic ticket dispensing machines, one-way faregates, restrooms
B1	Connecting level Parking lot	Underground parking lot
B1	Connecting level Parking lot	Underground passage to exit A and Wenhu line Station
B2	Concourse	Entrance/exit, lobby, information desk, automatic ticket dispensing machines, one-way faregates, restrooms
B3	Platform 1	→ Bannan line toward Dingpu (BL22 Nangang) →
B3	Island platform, doors will open on the left/ right
B3	Platform 2	→ Bannan line toward Dingpu (BL22 Nangang) →

== Around the station ==
- Taipei Nangang Exhibition Center
- Lingnan Fine Arts Museum
- Mitsui Shopping Park LaLaport Taipei Nangang
- Taifer C2 Office Complex
