= Shopping in Taipei =

Taipei, Taiwan is known for its large number and variety of shopping streets, markets and malls and has been known to tourists as one of the main "shopping city" in Eastern Asia along with Hong Kong, Seoul, Tokyo, Singapore and Kuala Lumpur. Shopping venues in the city include department stores, malls, underground transit malls, night markets, and shopping districts.

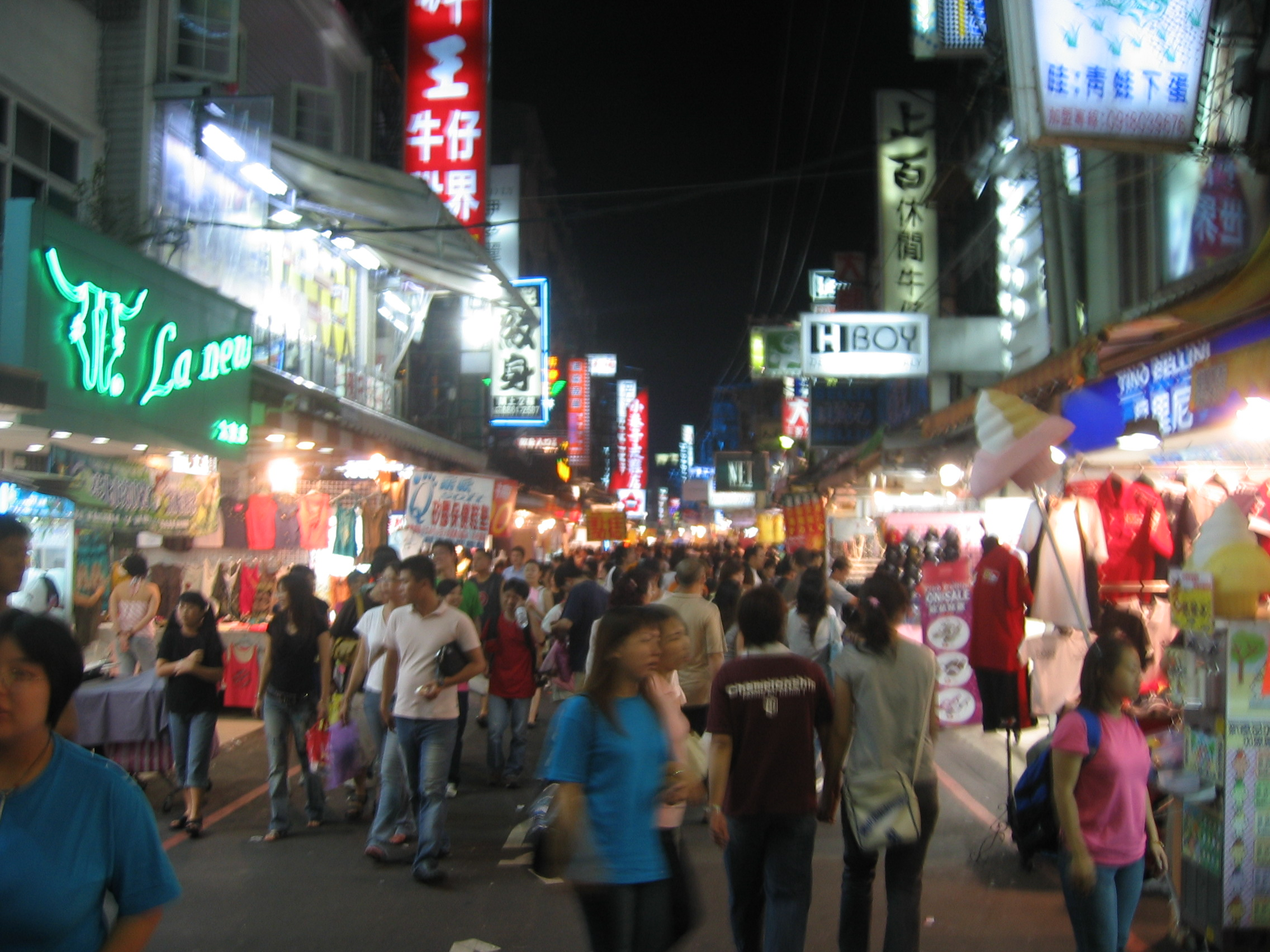
Shilin Night Market main alley

== Night markets ==
Taipei has many night markets, the most famous and busiest of which is the Shilin Night Market in the Shilin District (accessible from Jiantan Station). Night markets are a popular place for low price eating and shopping. Most night markets in Taiwan open around 4 PM, and crowds reach their peak between during the late evening hours. Businesses continue operating well past midnight. Shilin Night Market has become the largest and best-known night market in Taiwan, especially regarding food, and is a favorite focal point for Taipei's night life among residents and visitors alike.

Other notable night markets in Taipei include the Raohe Street Night Market (Songshan), Tong Hua Street Night Market (Daan), Huaxi Street Night Market (Wanhua), Wanhua Night Market (Wanhua), Gongguan Night Market (Zhongzheng), Shida Night Market (Daan), Jingmei Night Market (Wenshan), the Nanjichang Night Market (Zhongzheng), Ningxia Road Night Market (Datong), and the Shuangcheng Street Night Market (Zhongshan).

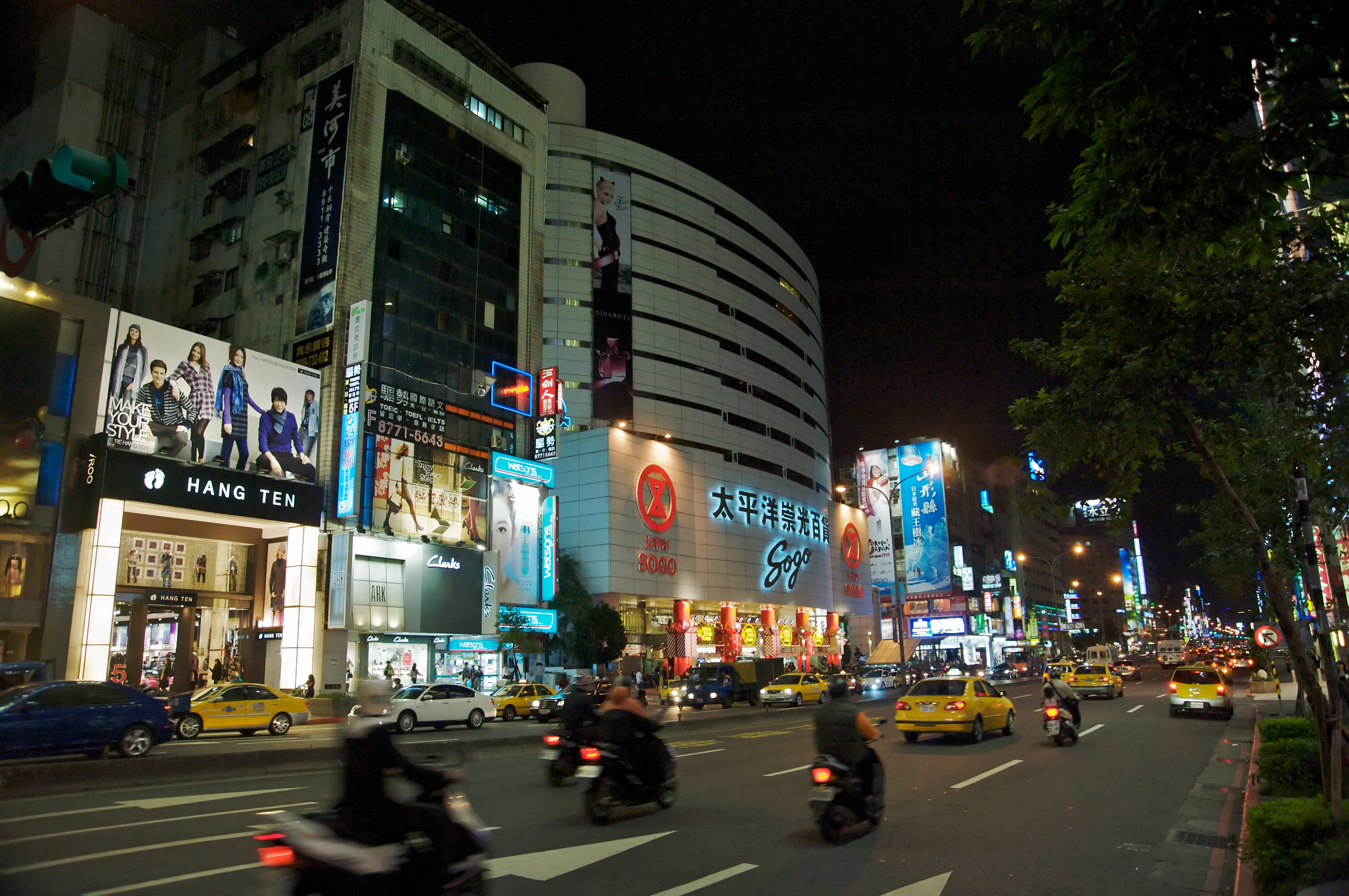
Zhongxiao East Road is a popular street with many shopping malls and shops.

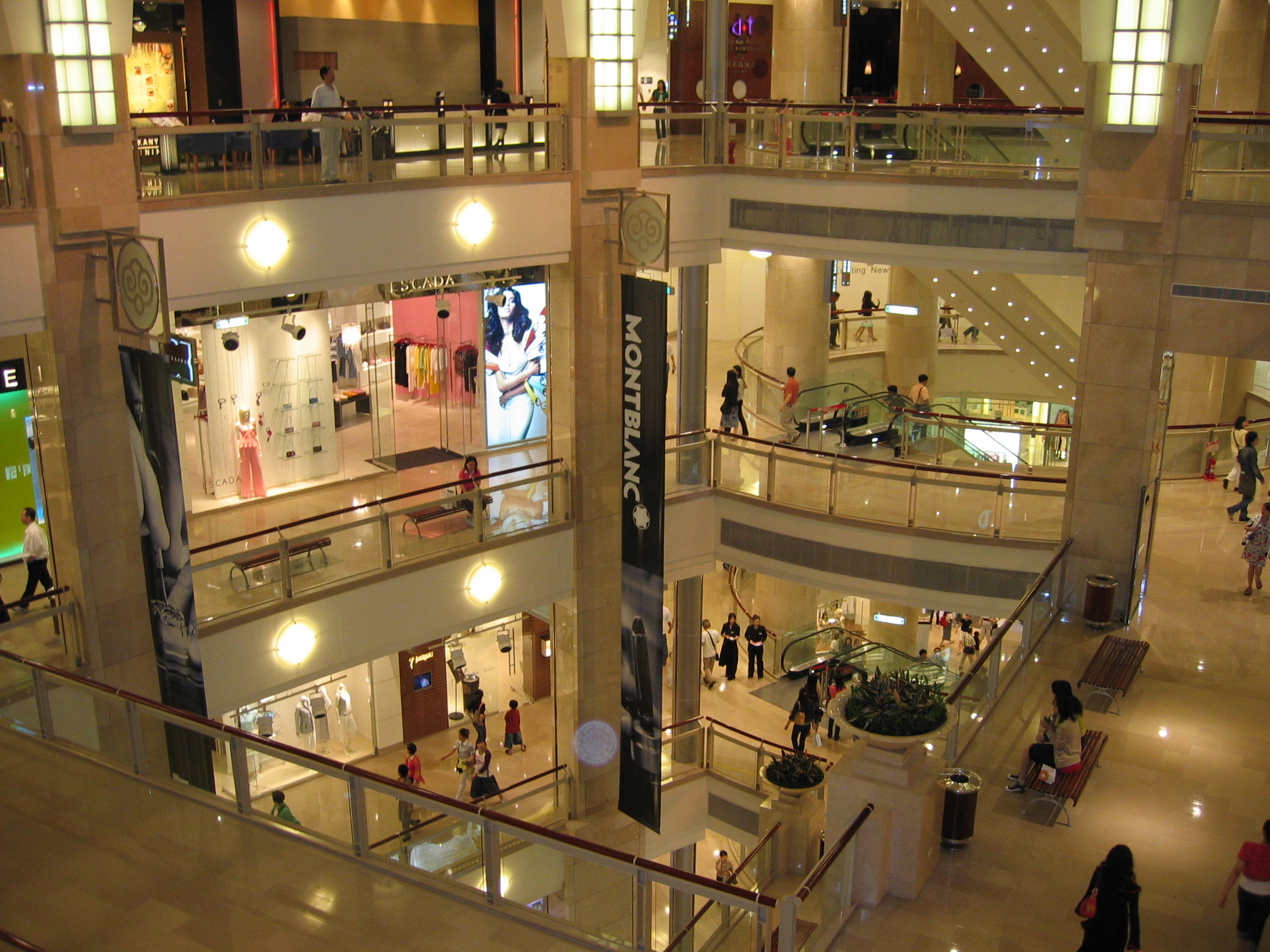
The mall at the base of Taipei 101

== Shopping malls ==
Shopping malls in Taipei are mainly concentrated in the Daan and Xinyi districts, though they can be found all over the city (including in Tianmu and Dazhi). Most malls are located along Zhongxiao East Road (accessible from Zhongxiao Fuxing Station and Zhongxiao Dunhua Station) or in the newly developed Xinyi District (Taipei City Hall Station). Malls are generally the source for high-end shopping, while markets are for less expensive items. Prominent shopping malls include:

- Taipei 101
- Shin Kong Mitsukoshi (four branches)
- Min Yao Department Store
- ATT 4 FUN
- Neo19
- Miramar Entertainment Park
- Eslite Bookstore (five branches)
- Asiaworld Shopping Center
- Pacific Sogo (four branches)
- Breeze Center
- Dayeh Takashimaya

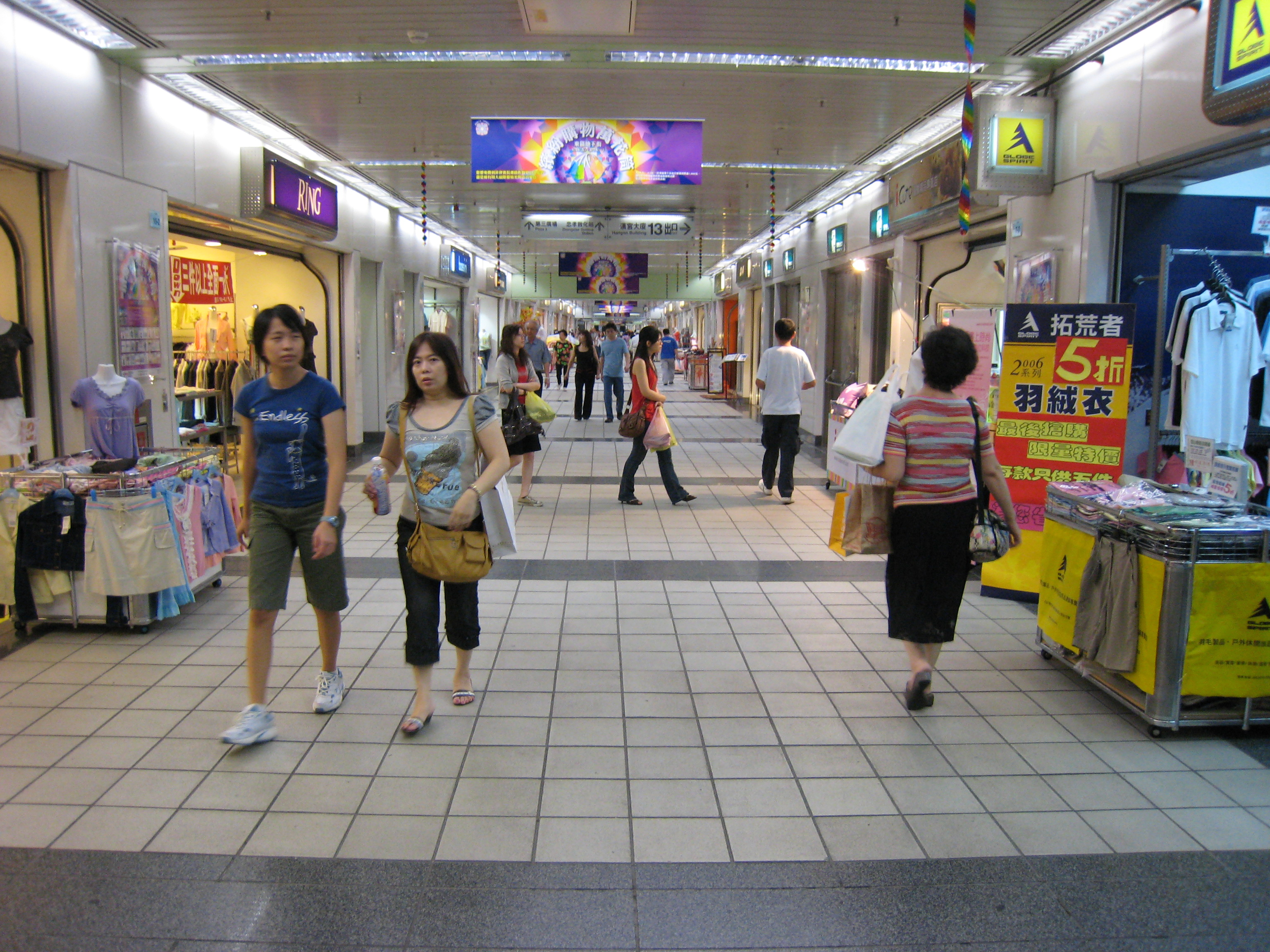
East Metro Mall, an underground shopping area

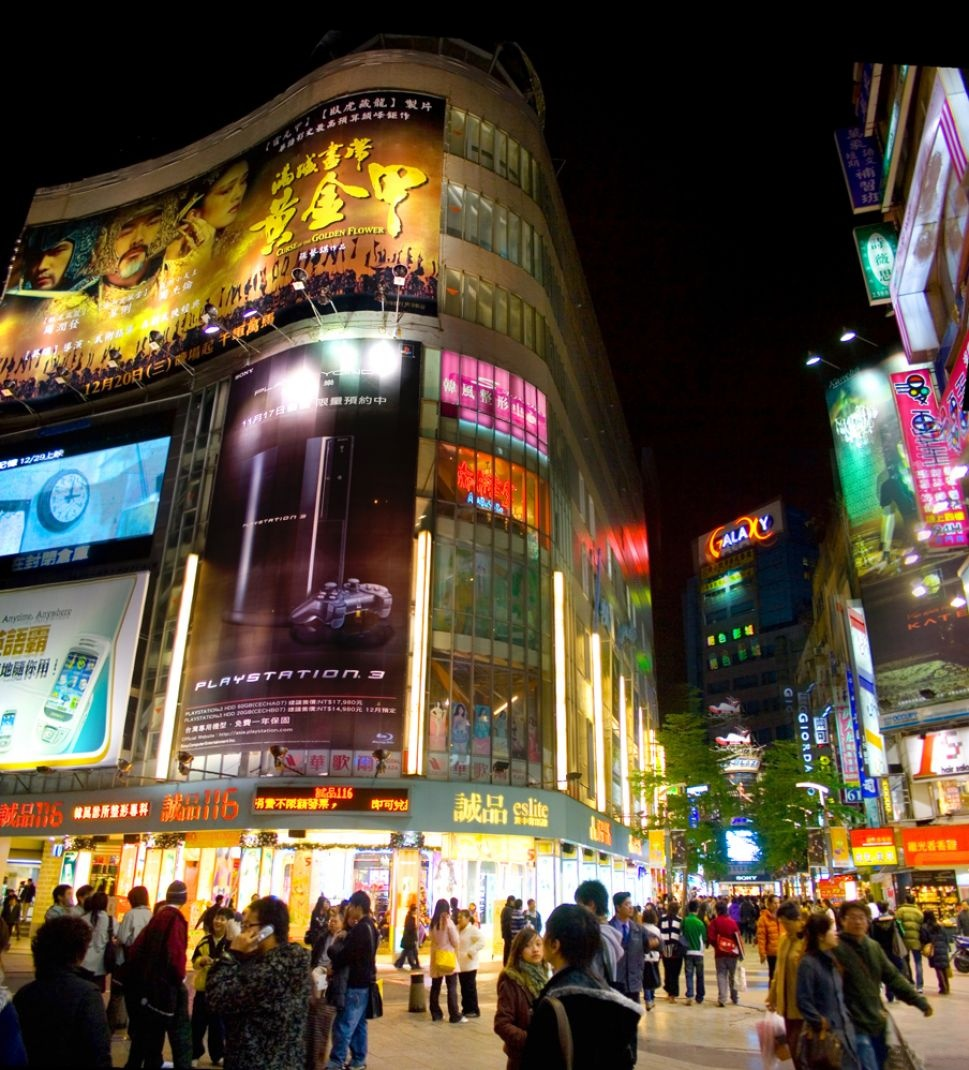
Ximending is a popular gathering place for young people.

== Underground malls ==
Due to its high population density and lack of space, Taipei also has many underground markets and malls that also serve as connections between metro stations.

- East Metro Mall (beneath Zhongxiao East Road)
- Taipei Underground Market
- Taipei City Mall
- Station Front Metro Mall
- Ximen Metro Mall
- Taipei New World Shopping Center
- Longshan Temple Underground Shopping Mall
- Zhongshan Metro Mall

== Specialized markets ==
Ximending became the famous theater street in Taipei in the 1930s. It continued to prosper after the defeat of Japan. In 1999, the area was redeveloped as a pedestrian zone and today, it is a popular shopping spot for young people (accessible from Ximen Station).

Guang Hua Digital Plaza is a technological and electronics market located between the Daan and Zhongzheng Districts (north of Zhongxiao Xinsheng Station). A few blocks west of Taipei Main Station on Hankou Street is the highest density of photography shops in Taiwan, selling camera-related products.

On weekends, the Taipei Jianguo Jade and Flower Markets open for business underneath the elevated Jianguo Road and stretch for over a kilometer. The Jade Market starts just south of Zhongxiao East Road and is one of the largest jade markets in all of Asia. Just south of the Flower Market is the Jianguo Artist Market, with vendors selling traditional Chinese handicrafts.

Wufenpu is an area in the Songshan District known as a wholesale hub for clothes retailers and is Taipei's largest wholesale clothing market. Yuanling Street in Zhongzheng District is a market for shoes, including shops selling handmade shoes. Aiguo East Road is home to over 20 bridal shops. Along Xinyi Road Sec. 3 and 4 a few kilometers from Taipei Zhongzheng Sports Center is a cluster of shops specializing in outdoor sporting goods (mostly hiking). On Minquan East Road is a row of shops selling fish and aquarium supplies.

Chongqing South Road has over bookshops. Xichang Street near Longshan Temple is lined with many herb shops. Also around Longshan Temple on Xiyuan Road is a collection of shops specializing in Buddhist items. Another area around Longshan Temple has many pet shops specializing in birds.

Taoyuan Street is a well-known street lined with beef noodle soup shops, a Taiwanese favorite. The Sihping St. Shopping Area is lined with many cafes, and it was historically the home to Taipei's tea trade.

During New Year's celebrations, the Dihua Street Market (in Datong District) attracts shoppers looking for Chinese medicine, traditional foods, herbs, temple icons and incense, cloths and wooden handicrafts.
