= Raohe =

Raohe (traditional Chinese: 饒河; simplified Chinese: 饶河) may refer to:

== Mainland China ==
- Raohe County (饶河县), of Shuangyashan, Heilongjiang
  - Raohe Town (饶河镇), seat of Raohe County
- Po River, or the Rao River (饶河), tributary in Jiangxi of Poyang Lake

== Taiwan ==
- Raohe Street Night Market (饒河街觀光夜市), in Songshan District, Taipei
