= Houshanpi metro station =

Metro station in Taipei, Taiwan

Houshanpi 後山埤
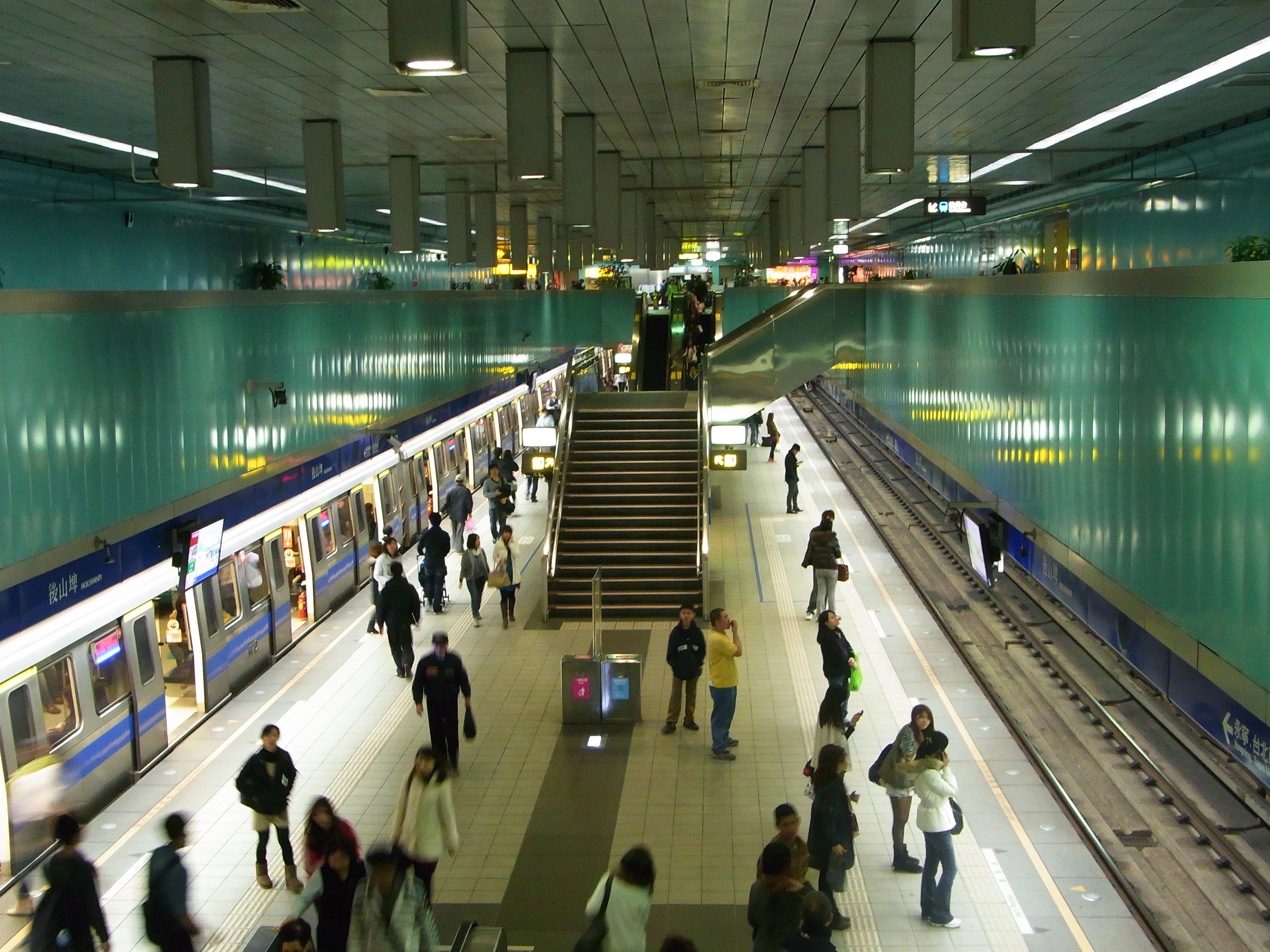
- Houshanpi station platform

Chinese name
- Traditional Chinese: 後山埤
- Simplified Chinese: 后山埤
Transcriptions
Standard Mandarin
- Hanyu Pinyin: Hòushānpí
- Bopomofo: ㄏㄡˋ ㄕㄢ ㄆㄧˊ
Hakka
- Pha̍k-fa-sṳ: Heu-sân-pî
Southern Min
- Hokkien POJ: Āu-soaⁿ-pi
- Tâi-lô: Āu-suann-pi

General information
- Location: No. 2, Sec. 6, Zhongxiao E. Rd. Xinyi and Nangang, Taipei; Taiwan
- Coordinates: 25.044864°N 121.582342°E
- Operator: Taipei Metro
- Line: Bannan Line
- Connections: Bus stop

Construction
- Structure type: Underground

Other information
- Station code: BL20

History
- Opened: 30 December 2000

Passengers
- daily (December 2024)
- Rank: 47 out of 109

Services
Preceding station	Taipei Metro	Following station
Yongchun towards Dingpu	Bannan Line	Kunyang towards Nangang Exhib Center
Yongchun towards Dingpu	Bannan Line	Kunyang Terminus
Location

The Taipei Metro Houshanpi station is a station on the Bannan line located on the border of the Xinyi and Nangang districts, Taipei, Taiwan. It opened for service on 30 December 2000, as part of an eastern extension to Kunyang.

== Station overview ==
This two-level, underground station has one island platform and four exits. It is located beneath Zhongxiao East Rd.

== Station layout ==
Street level	Entrance/exit	Entrance/exit
B1	Concourse	Lobby, information desk, automatic ticket dispensing machines, one-way faregates, restrooms (east side, outside fare zone near exit 3 and 4)
B2	Platform 1	← Bannan line toward Nangang Exhib Center / Kunyang (BL 21 Kunyang)
B2	Island platform, doors will open on the left
B2	Platform 2	→ Bannan line toward Dingpu / Far Eastern Hospital (BL19 Yongchun) →

=== Station Exits ===
Exits 1 and 2 are located at the south end of the station, while Exits 3 and 4 are at the north end. An accessible elevator is located at Exit 3.

Exit	Image	Location
Entrance/Exit １		Wufenpu Shopping District
Entrance/Exit ２		Yucheng Park (This exit is equipped with a co-constructed residential building)
Entrance/Exit ３		Zhongxiao Hospital (Taipei City Hospital Zhongxiao Branch)
Entrance/Exit ４		Yongji Road

== Around the station ==
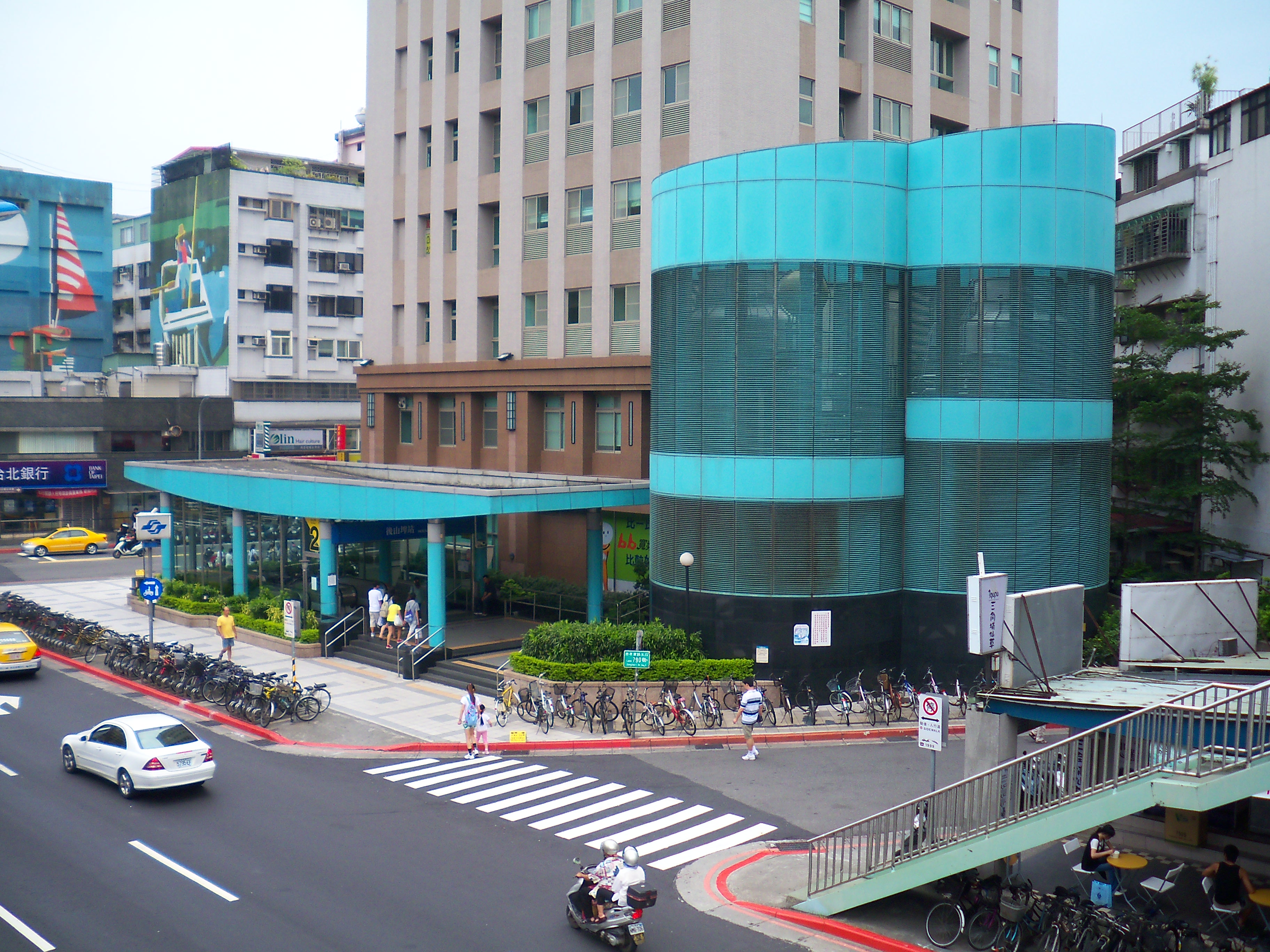
Houshanpi station exit 2

- Wufenpu
- Taipei City Hospital
- Yucheng Park
- Youde High School
- Chengde Elementary School (between this station and Kunyang station)
- Chengde Junior High School
- Yongchun Elementary School (between this station and Yongchun station)
- Yongji Elementary School
- Raohe Street Night Market
