= Nanshan Xinyi A21 =

Skyscraper office building in Xinyi, Taipei, Taiwan

Nanshan Xinyi A21 南山A21綠環塔
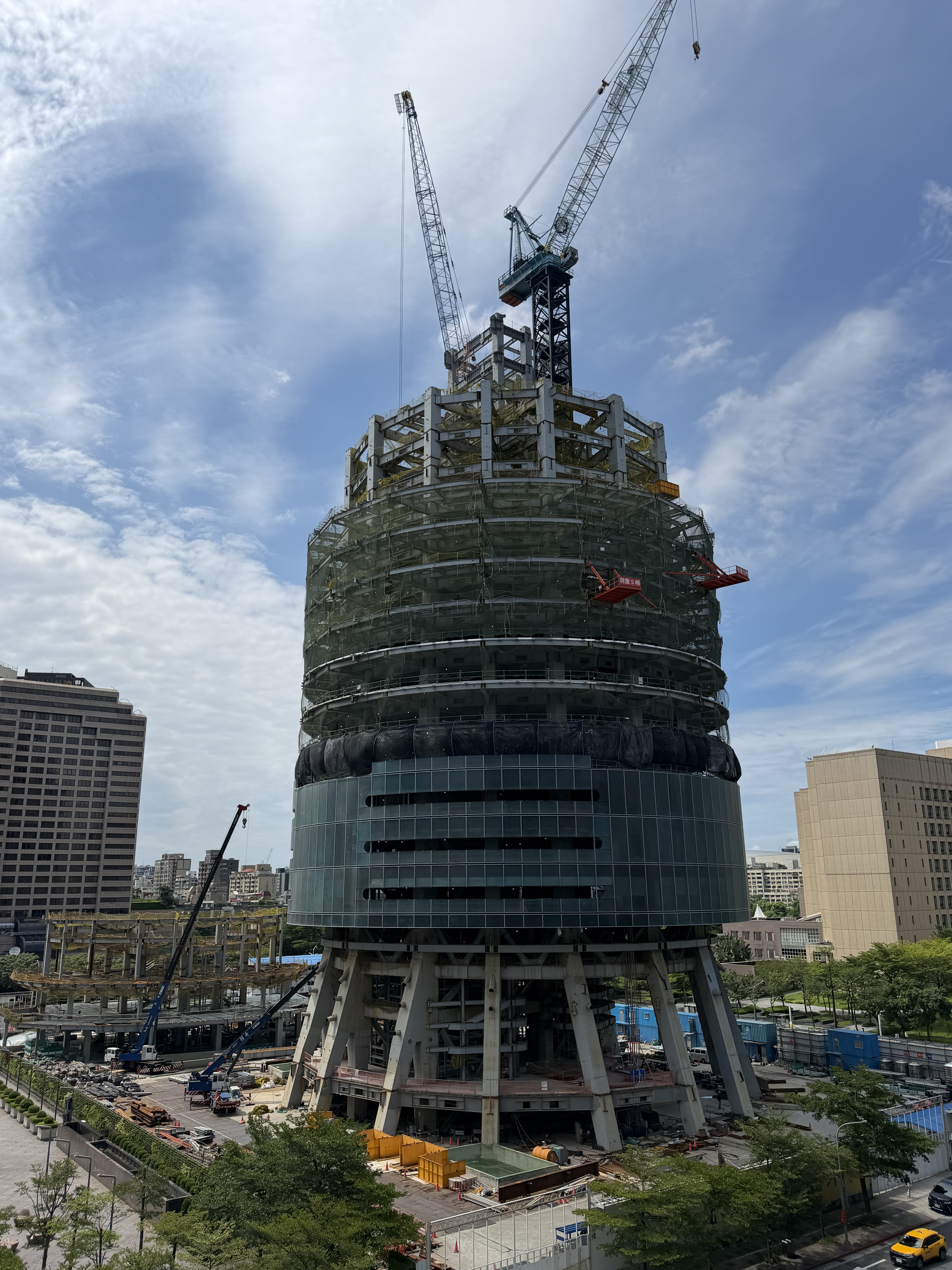
- Construction progress

General information
- Status: Under construction
- Type: Office
- Location: Xinyi District, Taipei, Taiwan
- Coordinates: 25°02′08″N 121°33′53″E
- Construction started: 18 April 2024
- Completed: 2028

Height
- Architectural: 232.6 m (763 ft)
- Roof: 218.2 m (716 ft)

Technical details
- Floor count: 43 above ground 3 below ground
- Floor area: 141,359 m^{2} (1,521,580 sq ft)

Nanshan Xinyi A21 (Chinese: 南山A21綠環塔), is an under construction, 232.6 m (763 ft), 43-storey skyscraper office building located in Xinyi Planning District, Xinyi District, Taipei, Taiwan. With a total floor area of 141,359 m^{2} (1,521,580 sq ft), the building is expected to be completed in 2028. The building is going to be among the top 10 tallest buildings in Taipei upon completion.

== Development History ==
The building will occupy the former site of Taipei World Trade Center (TWTC) Exhibition Hall 3. It was first entrusted by the International Trade Bureau to the Foreign Trade Association to operate it until the end of 2019. After the lease expired, the National Property Administration decided to release the land, and in March 2020, Nanshan Life Insurance paid NT$31.2 billion. Winning the bid, the original plan was to build a complex commercial building with 35 floors above the ground and 3 floors underground, with a height of 202 meters. He said that the idea was to use a crystal shape. Due to the large size of the building, when viewed from the City Hall Square, it will look like Taipei 101 is completely covered, and some committee members pointed out that the design of this building feels like an axe is going to chop off Taipei 101. They think that the design does not take into account the cultural and spiritual aspects, and the glass curtain design of the building may have serious reflections. The issue of light pollution has been blocked by both the metropolitan inspection and the environmental impact assessment.

== Gallery ==
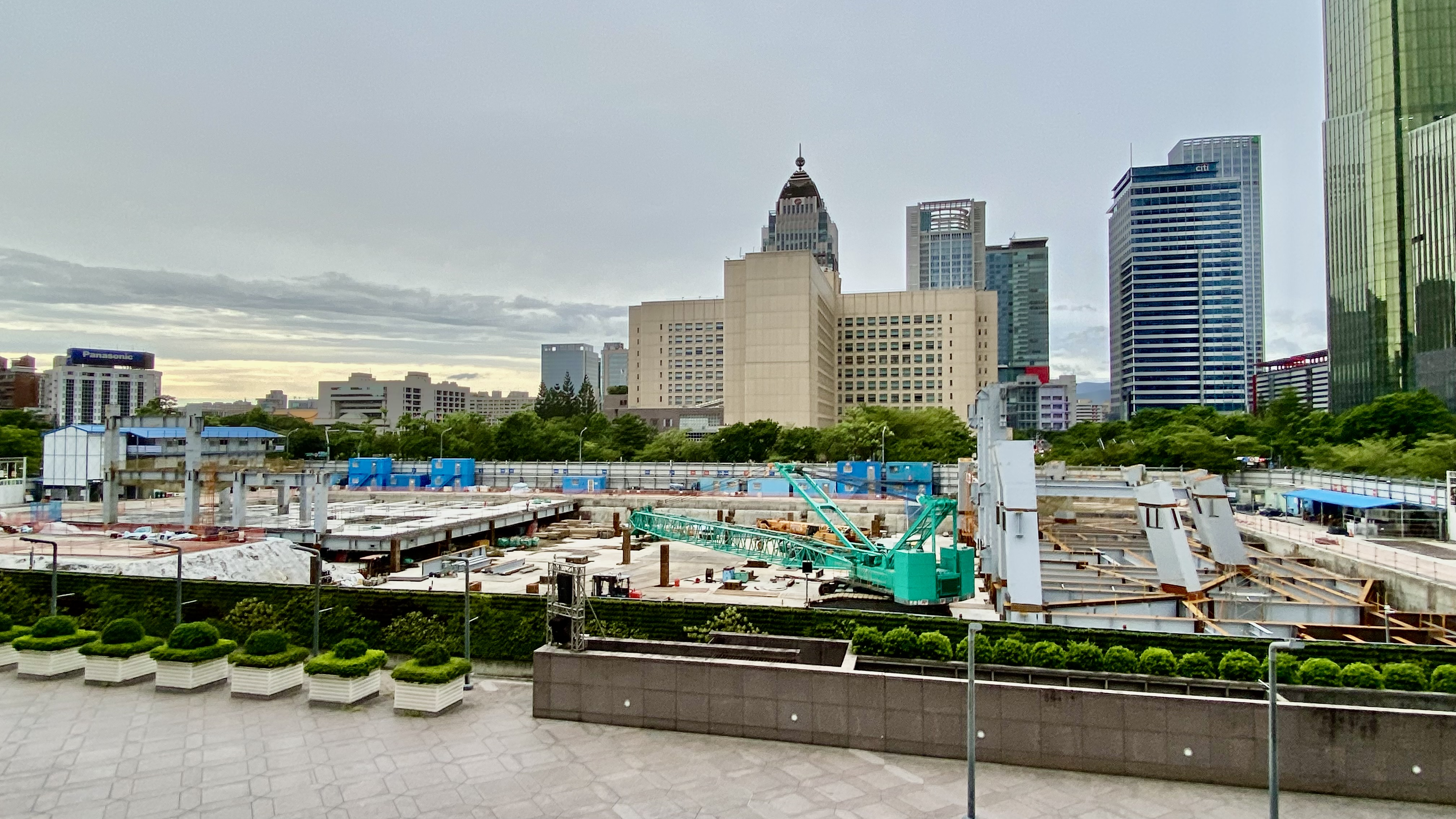
July 2025

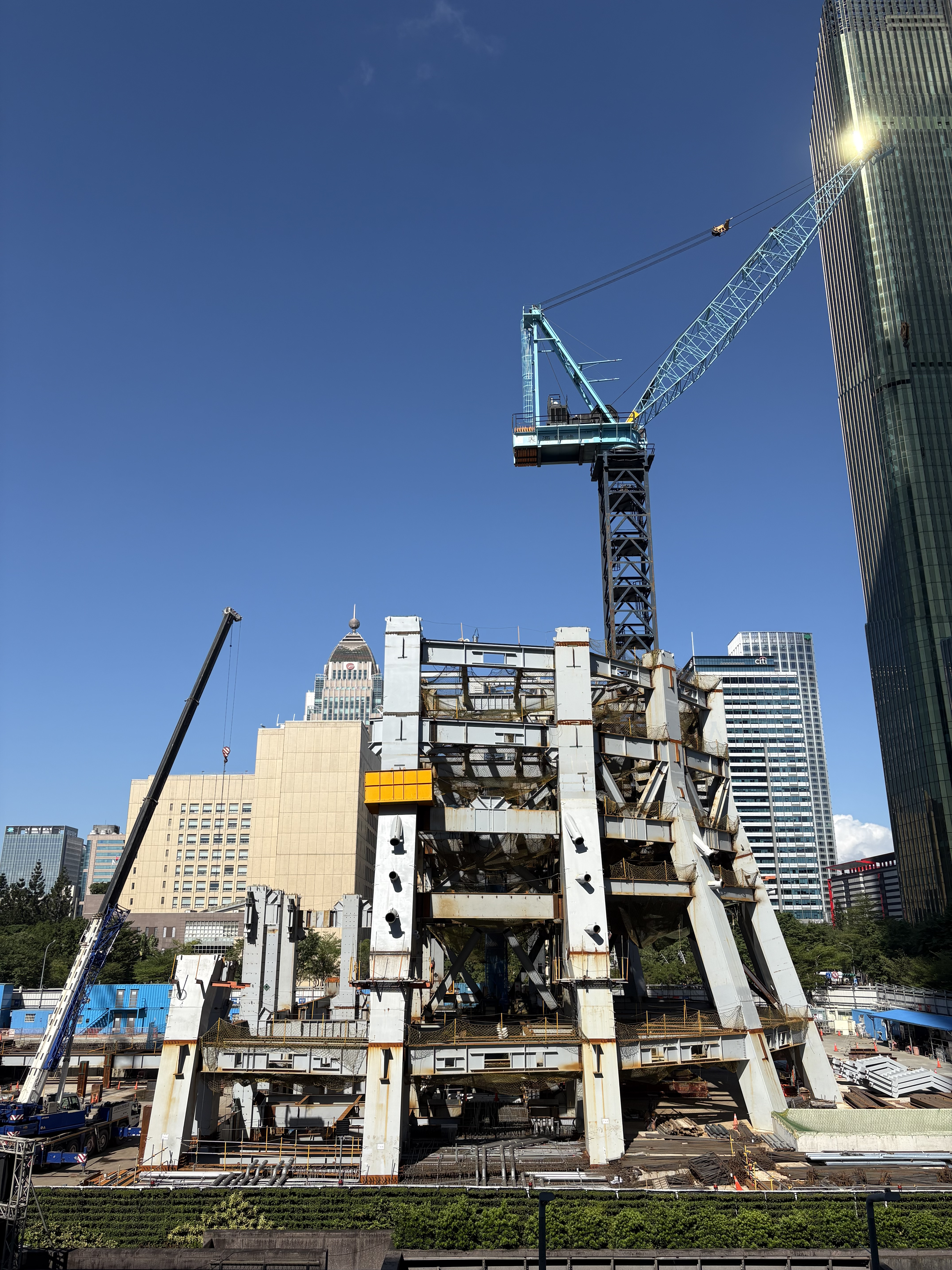
November 2025

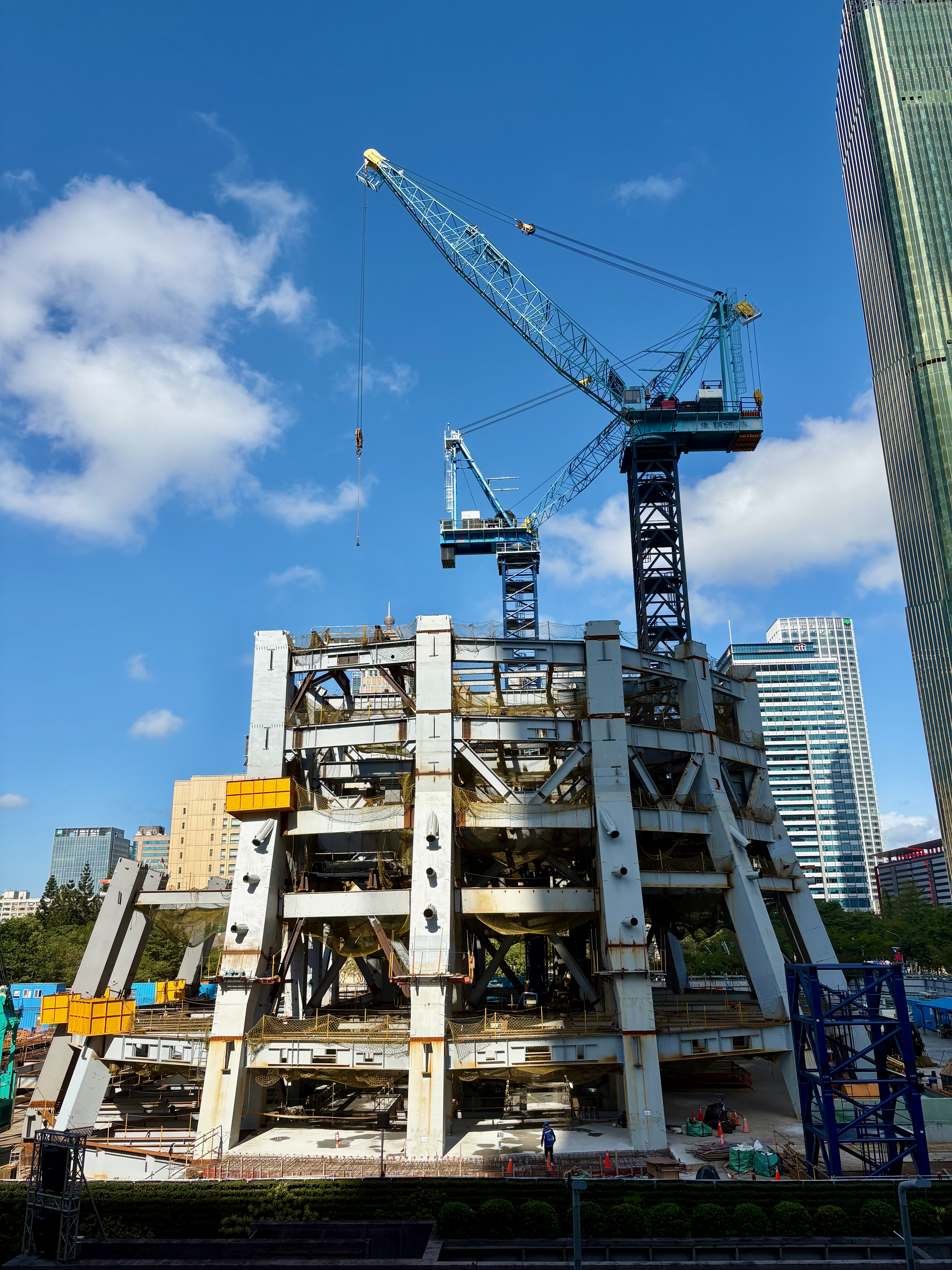
December 2025

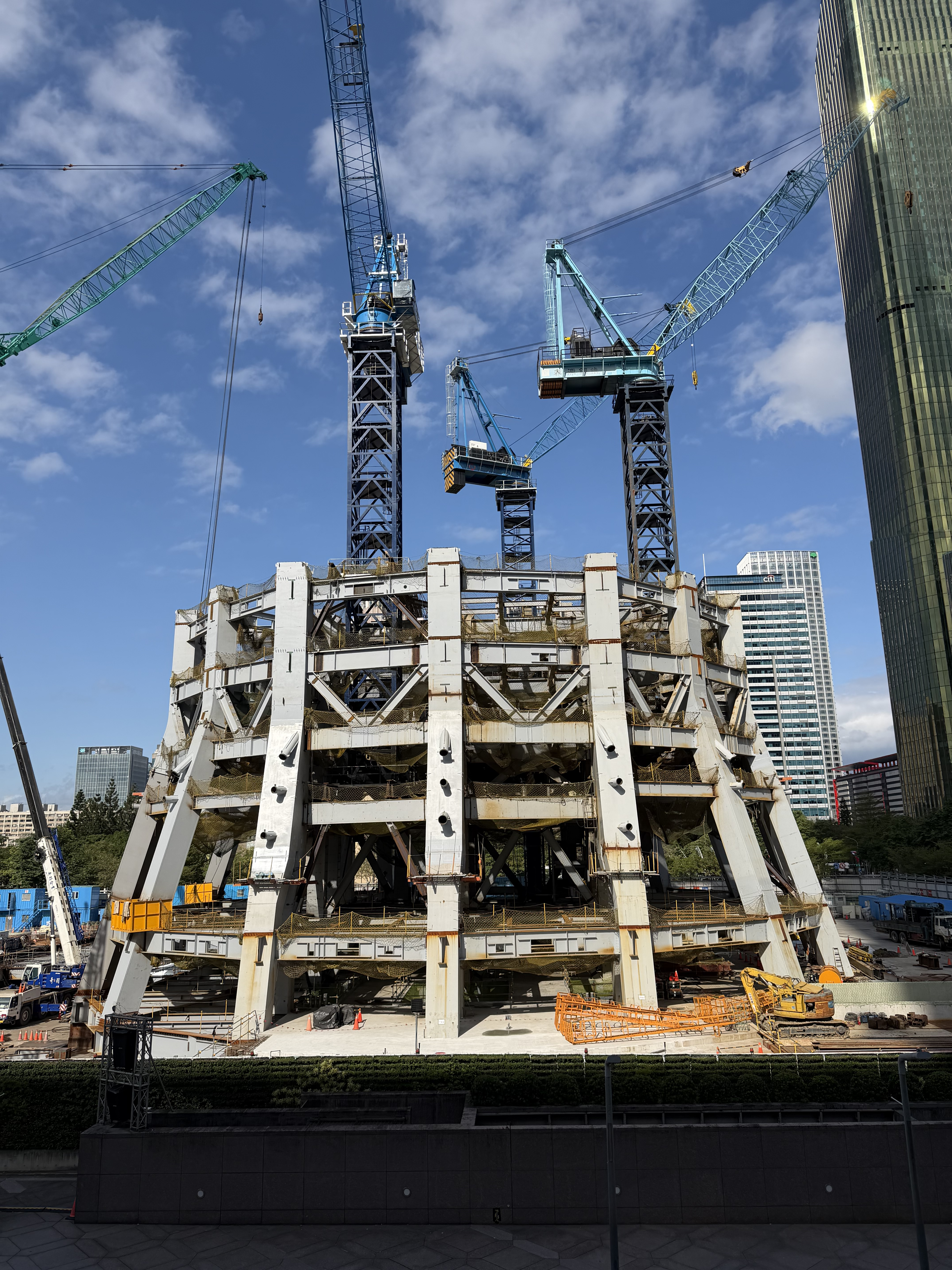
January 2026

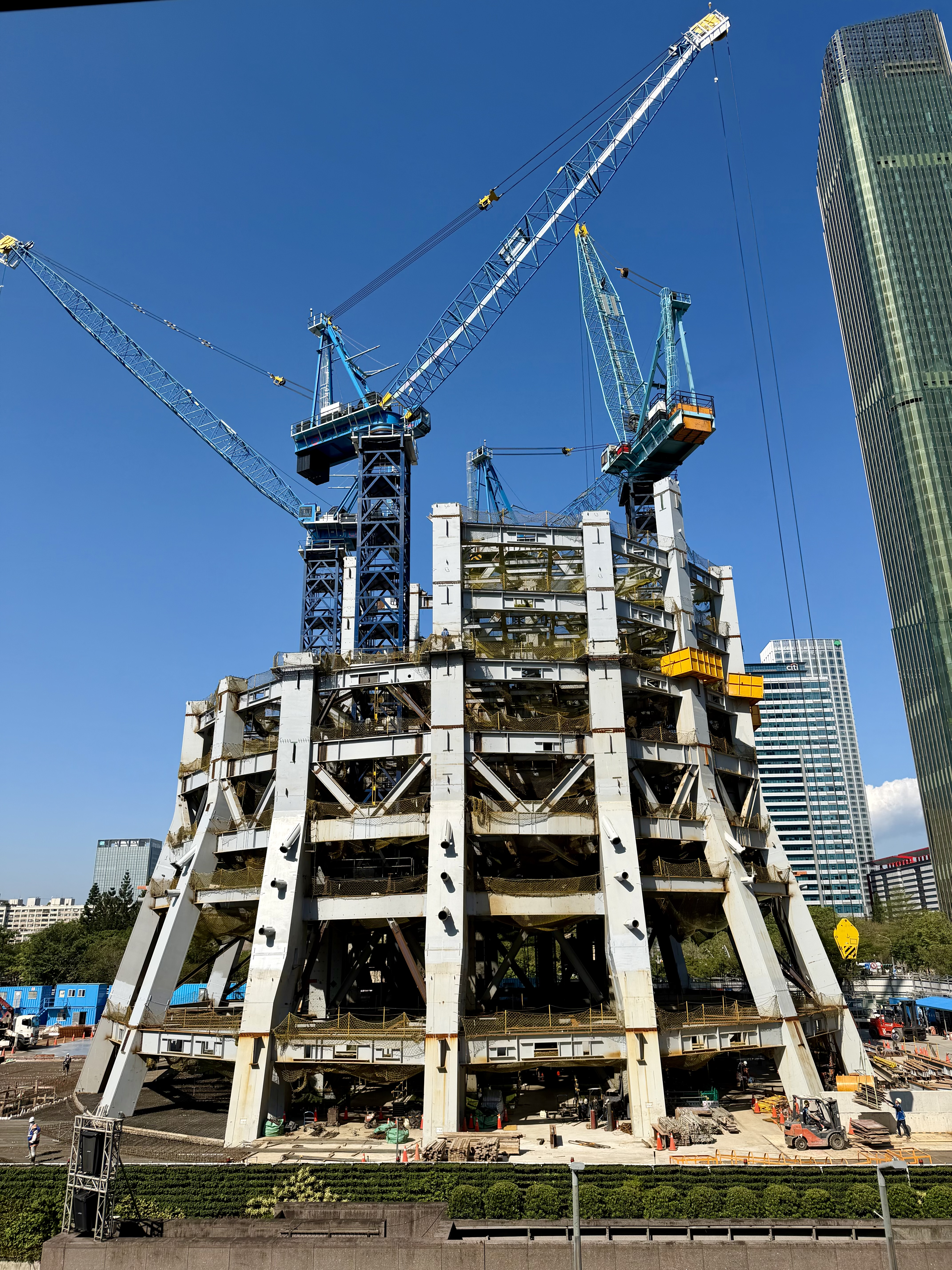
February 2026

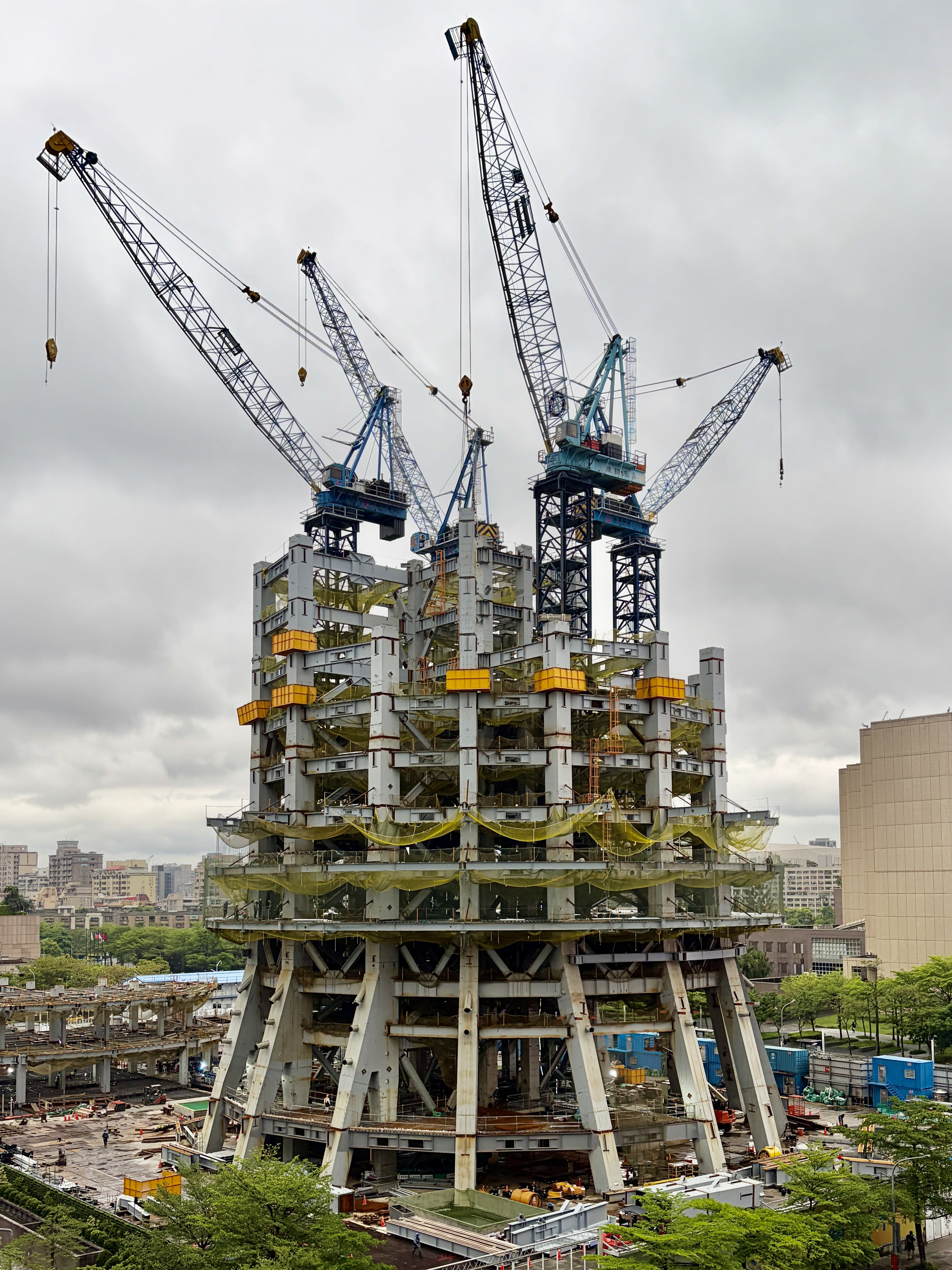
April 2026

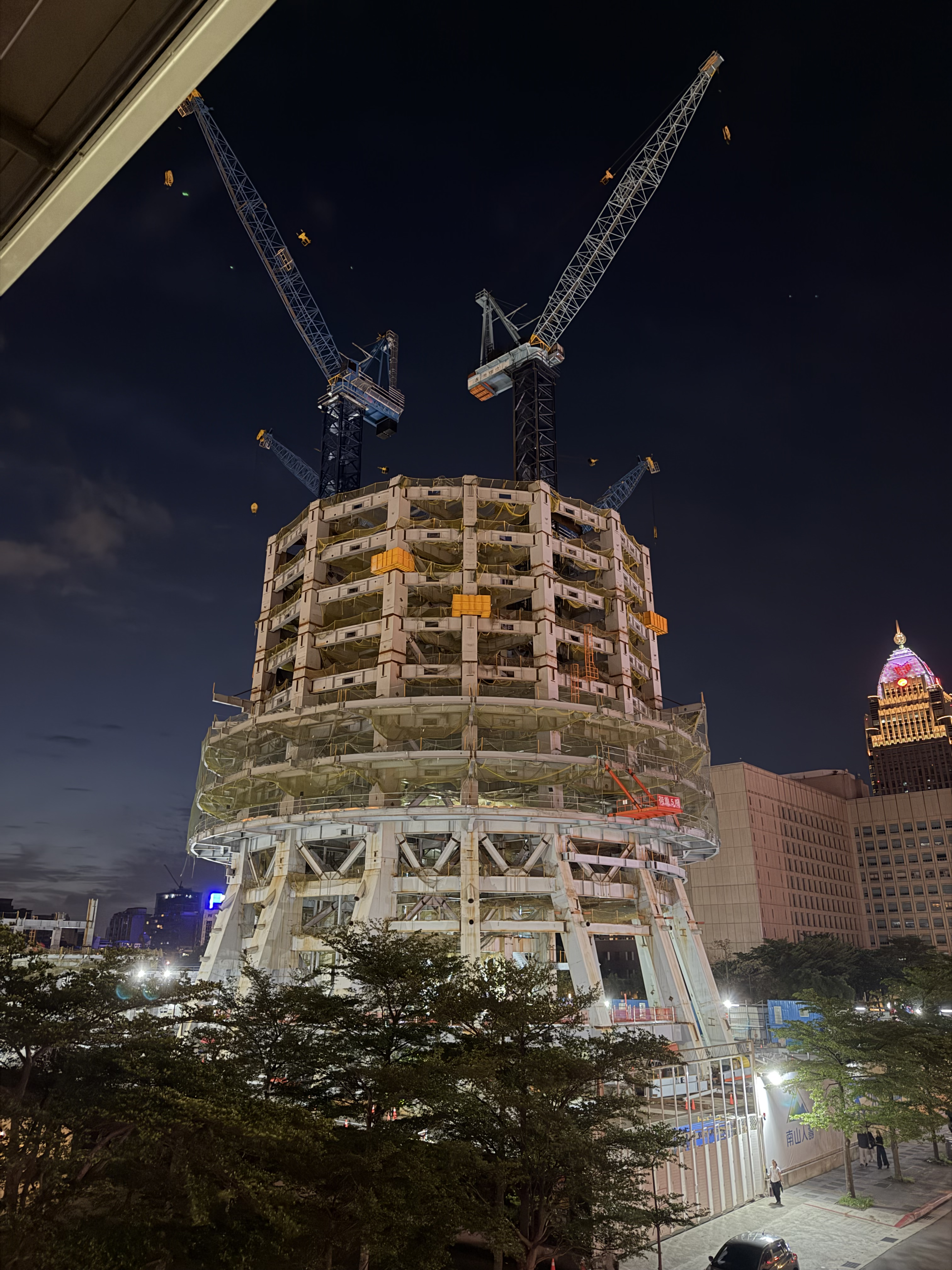
May 2026

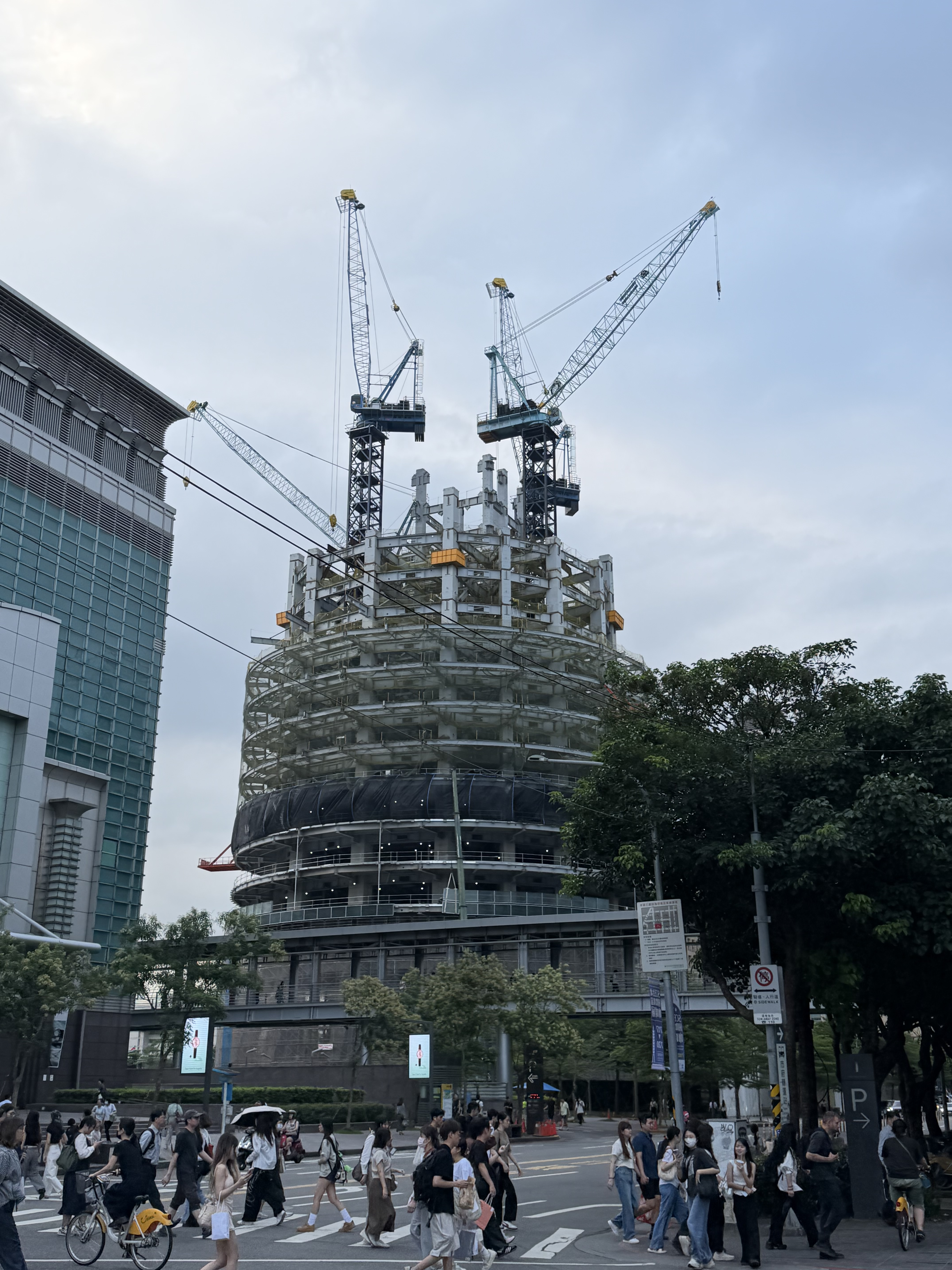
July 2026

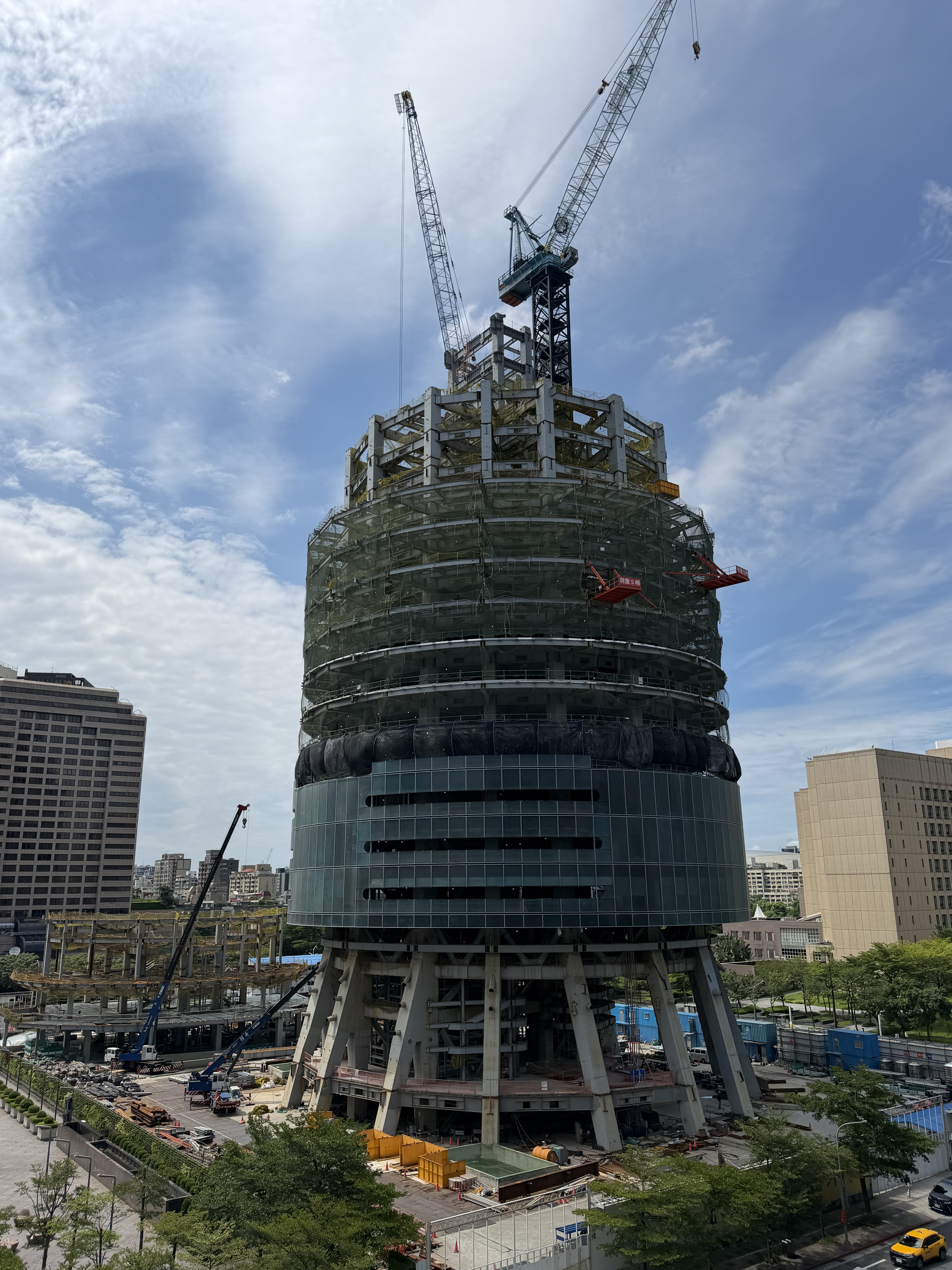
August 2026

Steptember 2026

November 2026

== See also ==
- List of tallest buildings in Taiwan
- List of tallest buildings in Taipei
- Xinyi Planning District
