= Sun Yat-sen Memorial Hall metro station =

Station on the Bannan Line of the Taipei Metro

Sun Yat-sen Memorial Hall 國父紀念館
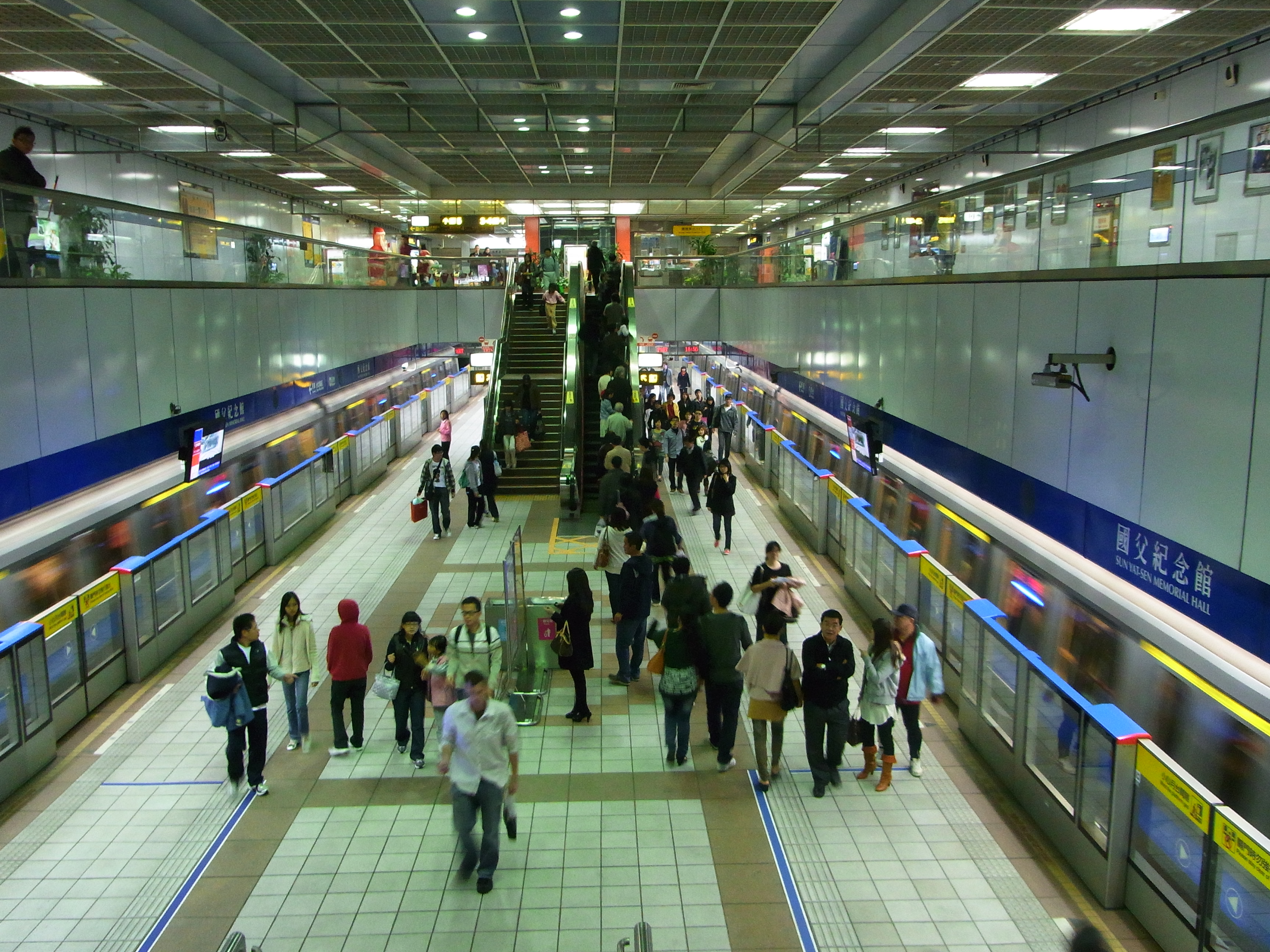
- Platform

Chinese name
- Traditional Chinese: 國父紀念館
- Simplified Chinese: 国父纪念馆
Transcriptions
Standard Mandarin
- Hanyu Pinyin: Guófù Jìniànguǎn
- Bopomofo: ㄍㄨㄛˊㄈㄨˋ ㄐㄧˋㄋㄧㄢˋㄍㄨㄢˇ
Hakka
- Pha̍k-fa-sṳ: Koet-fu Ki-ngiam-kón
Southern Min
- Tâi-lô: Kok-hū Kì-liām-kuán

General information
- Location: 400 Sec 4 Zhongxiao E Rd; Da'an and Xinyi Districts, Taipei; Taiwan
- Coordinates: 25.0414°N 121.5575°E
- System: Taipei metro station

Construction
- Structure type: Underground
- Cycle facilities: Access available

Other information
- Station code: BL17
- Website: web.metro.taipei/e/stationdetail2010.asp?ID=BL17-092

History
- Opened: 1999-12-24

Passengers
- 2017: 15.754 million per year ▼0.63%
- Rank: (Ranked 18 of 119)

Services
Preceding station	Taipei Metro	Following station
Zhongxiao Dunhua towards Dingpu	Bannan line	Taipei City Hall towards Nangang Exhib Center
Location

Sun Yat-sen Memorial Hall (Chinese: 國父紀念館; pinyin: Guófù Jìniànguǎn) is a metro station in Taipei, Taiwan served by Taipei Metro. It is named after the nearby Sun Yat-sen Memorial Hall.

== Station overview ==
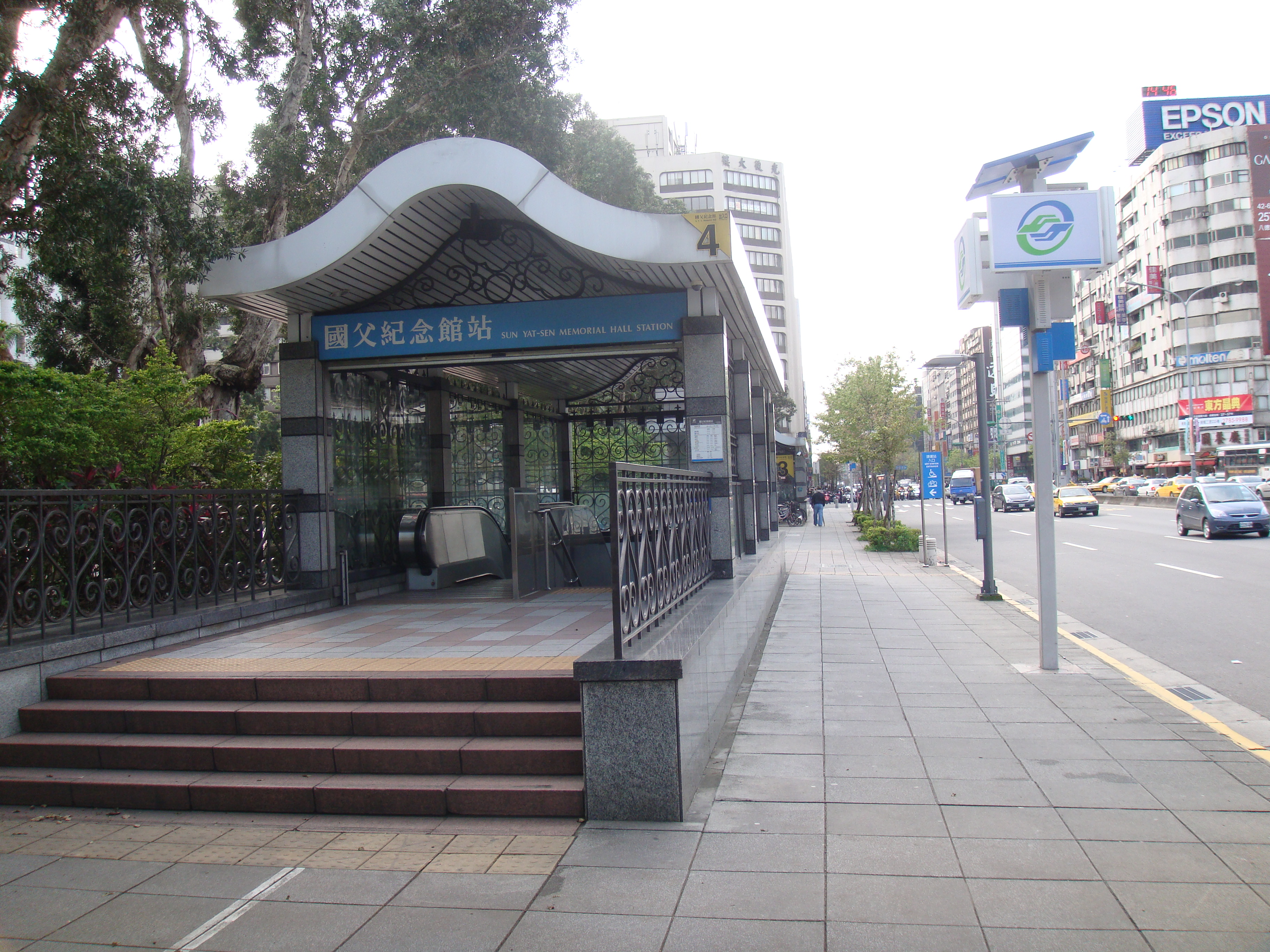
Sun Yat-sen Memorial Hall station exit 4

This two-level, underground station consists of an island platform and five exits. It is located at the intersection of Zhongxiao East Rd. and Guangfu South Rd.

Due to crowding during New Year's festivities, automatic platform gates have been installed at this station.

=== History ===
- 24 December 1999: Opened for service with the opening of the Taipei City Hall←→Longshan Temple segment.

== Station layout ==
Street level	Entrance/exit	Entrance/exit
B1	Concourse	Lobby, information desk, automatic ticket dispensing machines, one-way faregates, restrooms (east side, outside fare zone near exit 4)
B2	Platform 1	← Bannan line toward Nangang Exhib Center / Kunyang (BL18 Taipei City Hall)
B2	Island platform, doors will open on the left
B2	Platform 2	→ Bannan line toward Dingpu / Far Eastern Hospital (BL16 Zhongxiao Dunhua) →

=== Exits ===
- Exit 1: No.327, Zhongxiao E. Rd. Sec. 4
- Exit 2: No.304, Zhongxiao E. Rd. Sec. 4
- Exit 3: Zhongxiao E. Rd. Sec. 4 and Guangfu S. Rd.
- Exit 4: No.400, Zhongxiao E. Rd. Sec. 4
- Exit 5: No.345, Zhongxiao E. Rd. Sec. 4
- Exit 6: currently under construction, set to open in 2034

== Around the station ==
- Sun Yat-sen Memorial Hall
- Taipei International Convention Center
- Taipei Dome
- Fiscal Information Agency
- Songshan Cultural and Creative Park
- Chinese Television System
- Tourism Bureau
- National Property Administration
- The International Commercial Bank of China (between this station and Zhongxiao Dunhua station)
- Taiwan Railway Administration Taipei Railway Workshop
- Guangfu Elementary School
