= Yongchun metro station =

Metro station in Taipei, Taiwan

Yongchun / Y40 永春
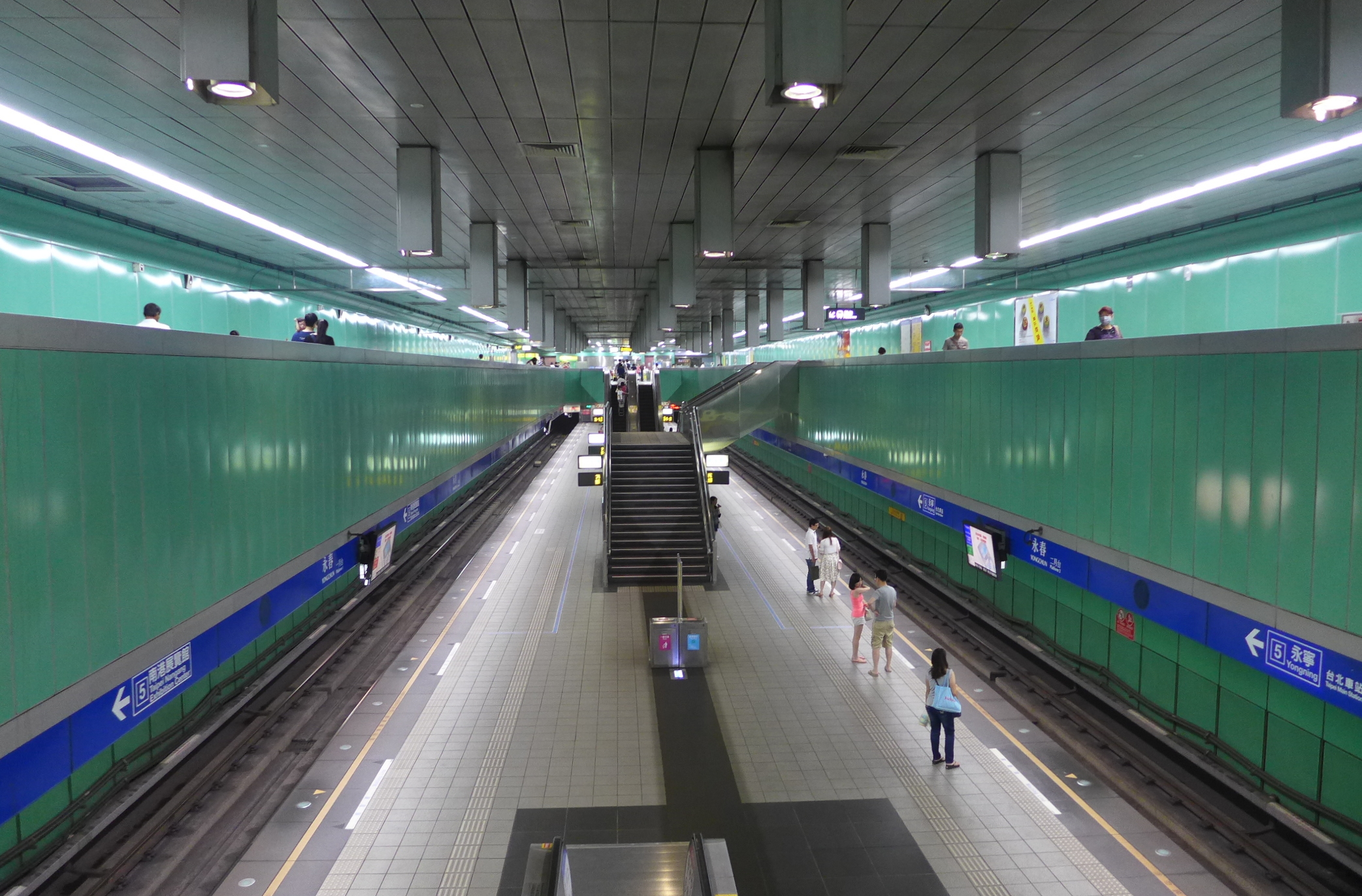
- Yongchun station platform

Chinese name
- Chinese: 永春
Transcriptions
Standard Mandarin
- Hanyu Pinyin: Yǒngchūn
- Bopomofo: ㄩㄥˇ ㄔㄨㄣ
- Wade–Giles: Yung³-chun¹
Hakka
- Pha̍k-fa-sṳ: Yún-chhûn
Southern Min
- Tâi-lô: Íng-tshun

General information
- Location: No. 455, Sec. 5, Zhongxiao E. Rd. Xinyi, Taipei; Taiwan
- Coordinates: 25.04087°N 121.575607°E
- Operator: Taipei Metro
- Lines: Bannan line (BL19); Circular Line (under construction)
- Connections: Bus stop

Construction
- Structure type: Underground

Other information
- Station code: / Y40

History
- Opened: 30 December 2000

Passengers
- daily (December 2024)
- Rank: 44 out of 109

Services
Preceding station	Taipei Metro	Following station
Taipei City Hall towards Dingpu	Bannan Line	Houshanpi towards Nangang Exhib Center

Future services
Preceding station	Taipei Metro	Following station
Songshan Foward direction	Circular Line Opening 2032	Xiangshan Reverse direction
Location

Yongchun station (formerly transliterated as Yungchun Station until 2003) is a station on the Bannan line of the Taipei Metro, located in Xinyi District, Taipei, Taiwan. It opened on 30 December 2000 as part of the eastern extension to Kunyang. It will become a transfer station with the Circular line in 2032.

== Station overview ==
This two-level, underground station has one island platform and five exits. It is located underneath Zhongxiao East Road.

Two of the entrances are constructed with joint development buildings - E.A.T. Fashion Building and E.A.T. International Building.

== Station layout ==
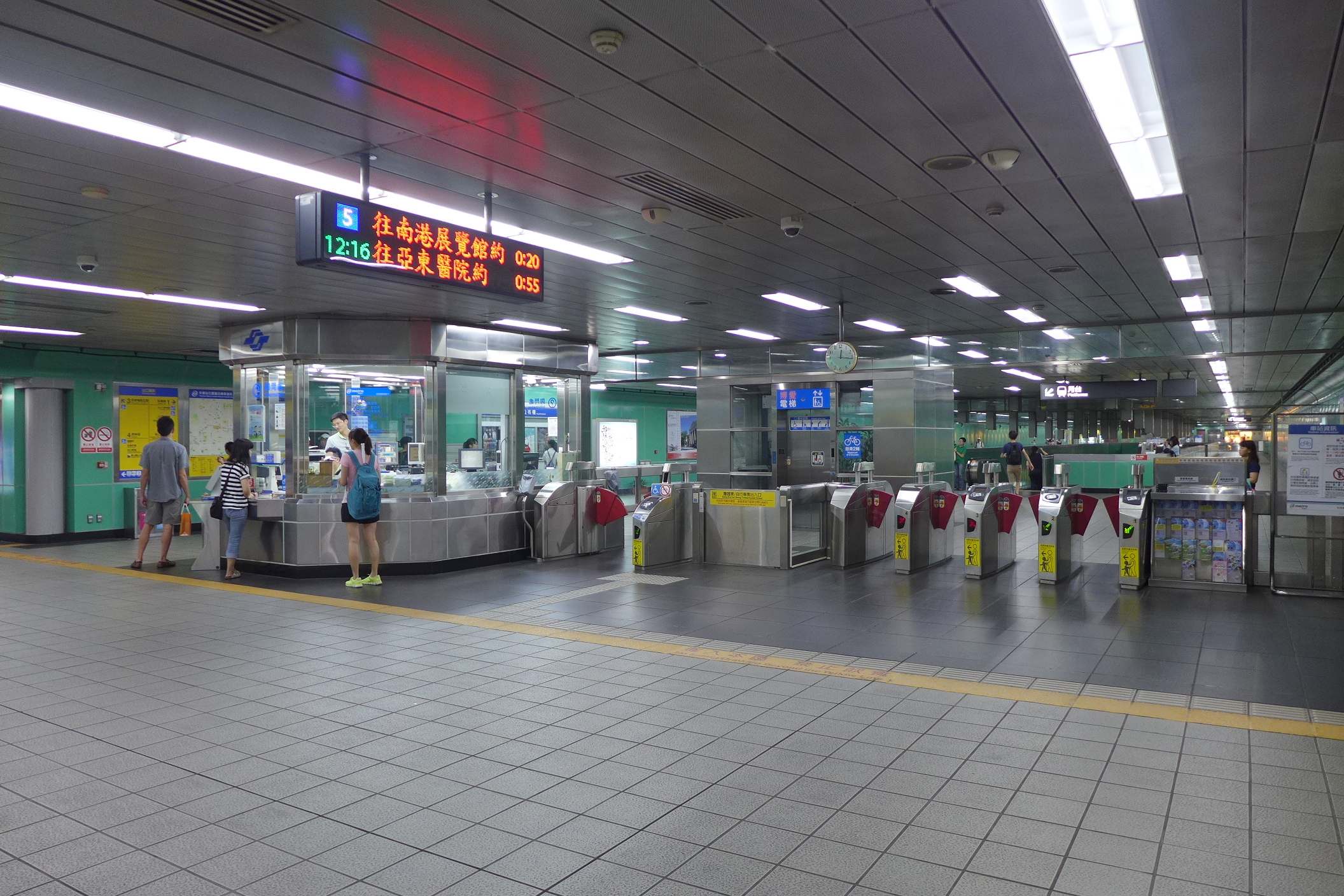
Yongchun station concourse

Street level	Entrance/exit	Entrance/exit
B1	Concourse	Lobby, information desk, automatic ticket dispensing machines, one-way faregates, restrooms (east side, outside fare zone near exit 4)
B2	Platform 1	← Bannan line toward Nangang Exhib Center / Kunyang (BL20 Houshanpi)
B2	Island platform, doors will open on the left
B2	Platform 2	→ Bannan line toward Dingpu / Far Eastern Hospital (BL18 Taipei City Hall) →

=== Exits ===
Exit	Image	Location
MRT Entrance/Exit 1		Songxin Road (This exit is equipped with a joint development building)
MRT Entrance/Exit 2		Songshan High School of Agriculture and Industry, YouBike Station, located in the alleyway. (This exit is equipped with a co-constructed residential building)
MRT Entrance/Exit 3		Section 5, Zhongxiao East Road
MRT Entrance/Exit 4		Hulin Street
MRT Entrance/Exit 5		Futai Public Housing (This exit is equipped with a co-constructed residential building)
A total of 5 exits!

== Around the station ==
- Yongchun Market
- a.mart (Zhongxiao Branch)
- Taipei Songshan High School of Agriculture and Industry
- Taipei Municipal Song Shan High School of Commerce
- Yongji Elementary School
- Yonchun Elementary School (between this station and Houshanpi metro station)
- Taipei Songshan High School (between this station and Taipei City Hall metro station)
- Yongchun High School
