= Fiscal Information Agency =

Government agency of the Republic of China

- 財政資訊中心
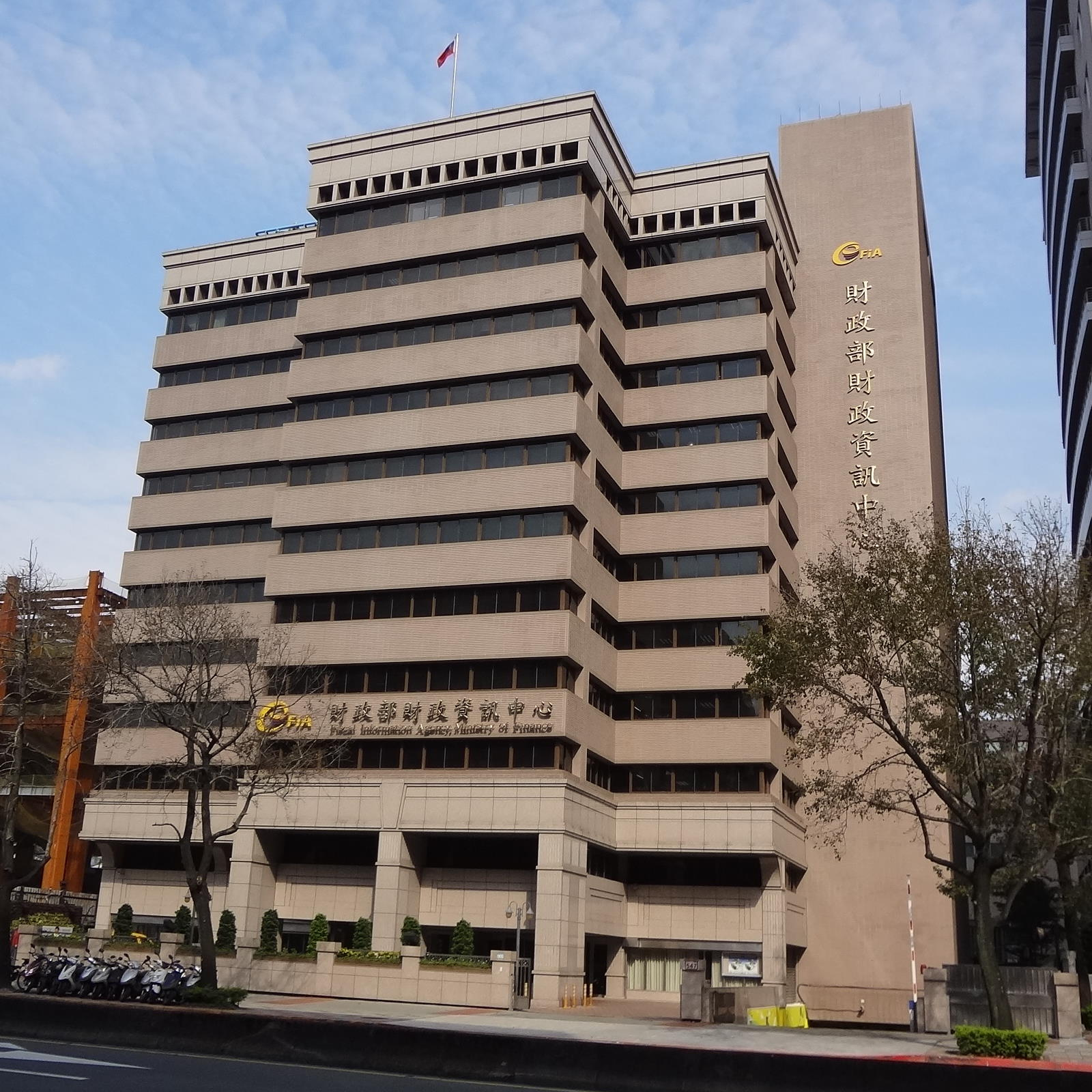

Agency overview
- Formed: 1968 (as Financial and Taxation Data Processing and Examination Center); 2013 (as FIA)
- Preceding agencies: Financial and Taxation Data Processing and Examination Center; Financial Data Center
- Jurisdiction: Republic of China
- Headquarters: Xinyi, Taipei, Taiwan; 25°02′30.3″N 121°33′43.6″E
- Agency executives: Chang Wen-hsi, Director-General; Hsu Ning-yung, Shieh Don-liang, Deputy Director-Generals
- Parent agency: Ministry of Finance
- Website: Official website

The Fiscal Information Agency (FIA; traditional Chinese: 財政部財政資訊中心; simplified Chinese: 财政部财政资讯中心; pinyin: Cáizhèngbù Cáizhèng Zīxùn Zhōngxīn) is an agency of the Ministry of Finance of the Taiwan (ROC).

== History ==
FIA was originally established as Financial and Taxation Data Processing and Examination Center in 1968. It was later integrated to the Ministry of Finance in 1970 and renamed to Financial Data Center in 1987. It was finally renamed to Fiscal Information Agency in 2013.

== Organizational structure ==
=== Divisions ===
- Comprehensive Planning Division
- Taxation and Collection Division
- Information and Communication Division
- National Taxes Division
- Local Tax Division
- Data Processing Division
- Support Service Division

=== Offices ===
- Secretariat
- Accounting Office
- Personnel Office
- Civil Service Ethics Office

== Transportation ==
The FIA office is accessible within walking distance East from Sun Yat-sen Memorial Hall Station of the Taipei Metro.

== See also ==
- Ministry of Finance (Taiwan)
