= Discovery Center of Taipei =

Education center in Xinyi, Taipei, Taiwan

- 台北探索館
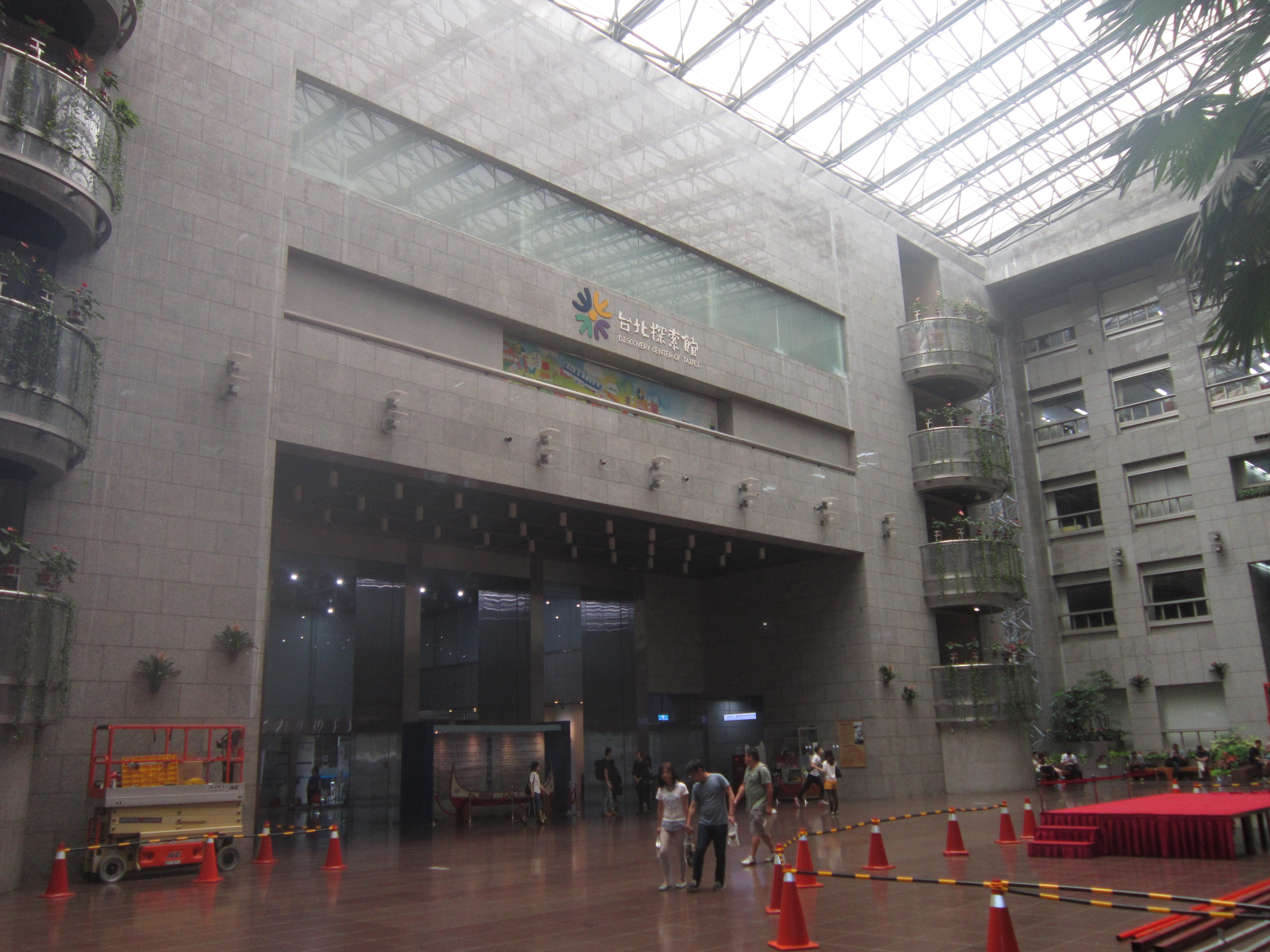
- Interactive map of Discovery Center of Taipei
- Location: Xinyi, Taipei, Taiwan
- Coordinates: 25°02′15″N 121°33′50″E
- Type: educational center

Construction
- Opened: 16 December 2002

Website
- Official website

The Discovery Center of Taipei (traditional Chinese: 台北探索館; simplified Chinese: 台北探索馆; pinyin: Táiběi Tànsuǒguǎn) is an educational center in Xinyi District, Taipei, Taiwan. The center is located at Taipei City Hall.

== History ==
The center was inaugurated on 16 December 2002 presided by Taipei Mayor Ma Ying-jeou from the former Taipei City Archives. He said that the center was established to let Taipei residents to understand the history of Taipei City better.

== Architecture ==
The center is located in the renovated former Taipei City information center of the city hall. The center consists of:

- Taipei Impression Hall
- Special Exhibition Hall
- City Discovery Hall
- "Dialogue with Time" Hall

== Transportation ==
The museum is accessible within walking distance south from Taipei City Hall Station of the Taipei Metro.

== See also ==
- List of tourist attractions in Taiwan
- List of science centers#Asia
