= National Property Administration =

Government agency in Taiwan

Coordinates: 25.042937°N 121.556916°E

- 財政部國有財產署
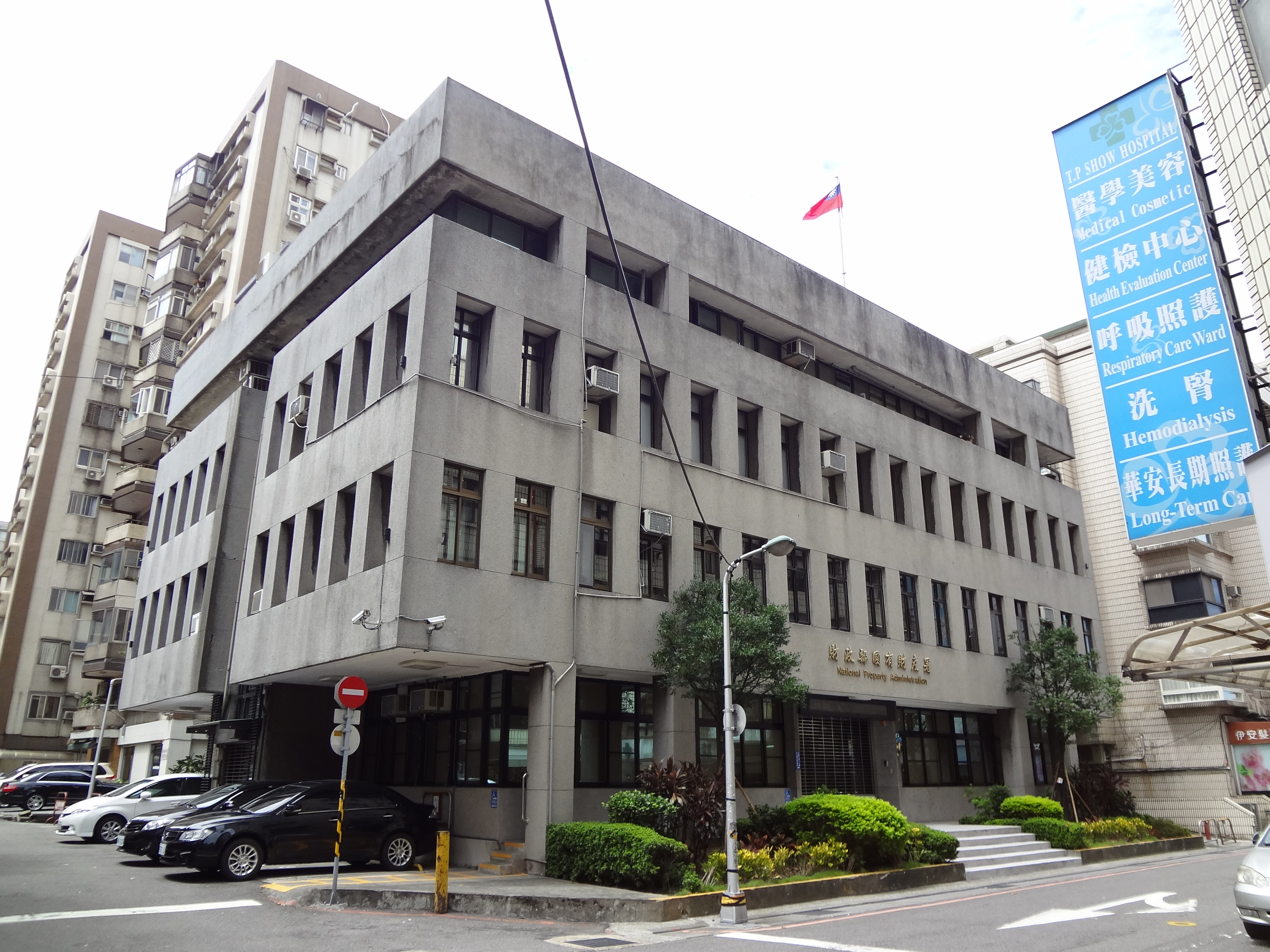
- The 1st office of National Property Administration

Agency overview
- Formed: 12 December 1960
- Jurisdiction: Taiwan (ROC)
- Headquarters: Da'an, Taipei
- Agency executives: Tseng Kuo-chi, Director-General; Li Cheng-tsung, Deputy Director-General; Pien Tyzz-shuh, Deputy Director-General
- Parent agency: Ministry of Finance (Taiwan)
- Website: Official website

The National Property Administration (FNP; traditional Chinese: 財政部國有財產署; simplified Chinese: 财政部国有财产署; pinyin: Cáizhèngbù Guóyǒu Cáichǎnshǔ) is the agency of the Ministry of Finance of Taiwan (ROC) responsible for the management of national property.

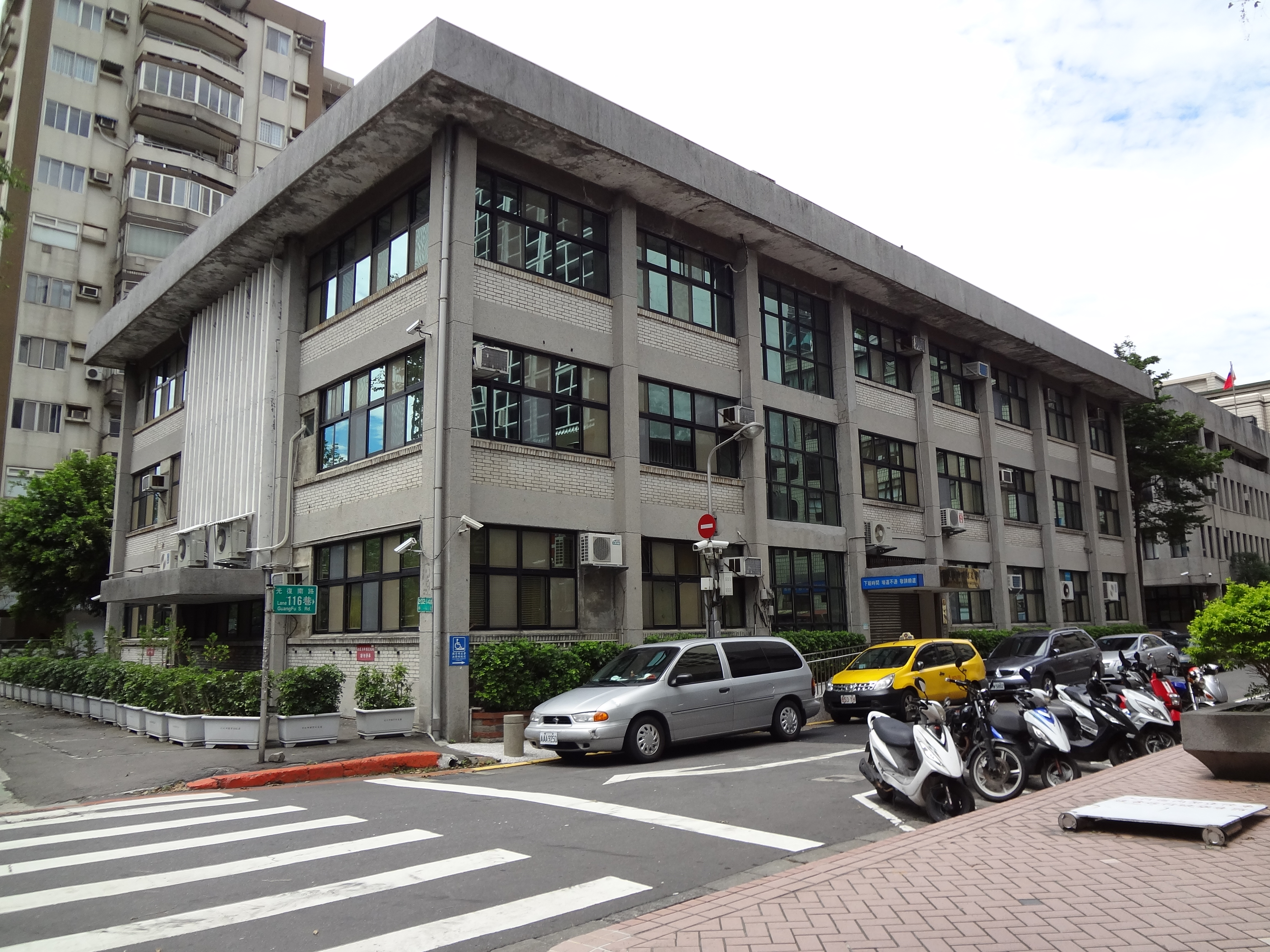
The 2nd office of National Property Administration

== History ==
The FNP was established on 12 December 1960 by the Organic Regulations for National Property Administration which was approved by the Executive Yuan on 24 November 1960.

== Responsibilities ==
- Inspections of national property
- Management of national property
- Disposal of national property
- Improved utilization of national property
- Transactions of national property information
- Investigations, coordination and allocation of national property
- Assessment of national property
- Consultation and management of regulations and legal cases of national property
- Other national property related issues

== Organizational structure ==
- Take Over and Custody Division
- Management and Disposal Division
- Development Division
- Public Assets Management Division
- Office of Computer Information
- Secretariat
- Office of Accountants
- Office of Personnel Affairs
- Civil Service Ethics Office
- Office of Law Affairs

== Transportation ==
NTA is accessible within walking distance North West of Sun Yat-sen Memorial Hall Station of the Taipei Metro.

== See also ==
- Ministry of Finance (Taiwan)
