= Taipei City Hall metro station =

Metro station in Taipei, Taiwan

Taipei City Hall 市政府
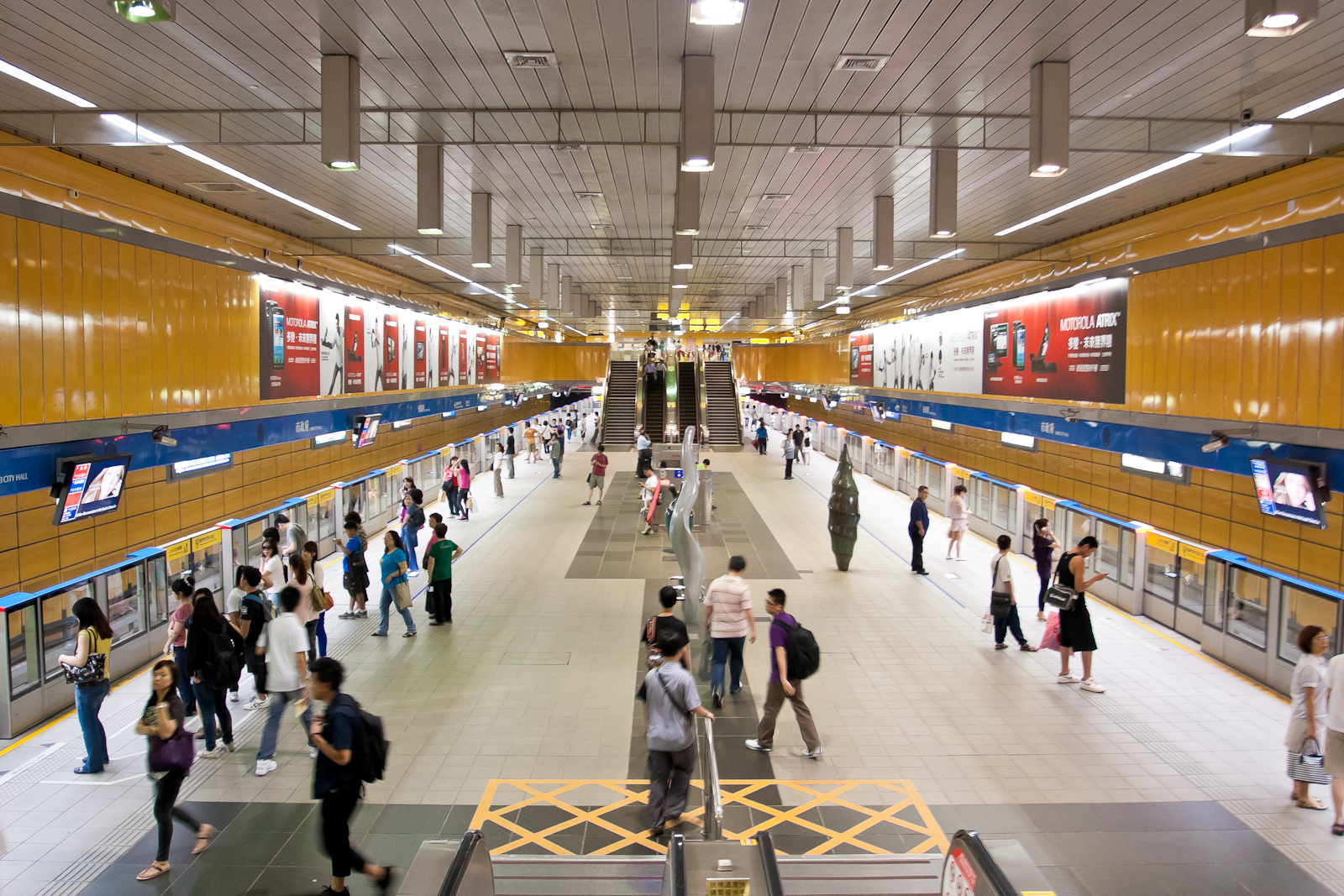
- Platform

Chinese name
- Chinese: 市政府
- Literal meaning: City government
Transcriptions
Standard Mandarin
- Hanyu Pinyin: Shìzhèngfǔ
- Bopomofo: ㄕˋ ㄓㄥˋ ㄈㄨˇ
Hakka
- Pha̍k-fa-sṳ: Sṳ-chṳn-fú
Southern Min
- Tâi-lô: Chī-tsìng-hù

General information
- Location: 2 Sec 5 Zhongxiao E Rd; Xinyi District, Taipei; Taiwan
- Coordinates: 25.0411°N 121.5663°E
- System: Taipei metro station

Construction
- Structure type: Underground
- Cycle facilities: Access available

Other information
- Station code: BL18
- Website: english.metro.taipei/cp.aspx?n=1BE0AF76C79F9A38

History
- Opened: December 24, 1999

Passengers
- 2016: 143,184 daily (December 2024) ▲3.28%
- Rank: (Ranked 3 of 119)

Services
Preceding station	Taipei Metro	Following station
Sun Yat-sen Memorial Hall towards Dingpu	Bannan line	Yongchun towards Nangang Exhib Center
Location

Taipei City Hall (Chinese: 市政府; pinyin: Shìzhèngfǔ) is a metro station in Taipei, Taiwan served by Taipei Metro. It is a station on Bannan line.

== Station overview ==
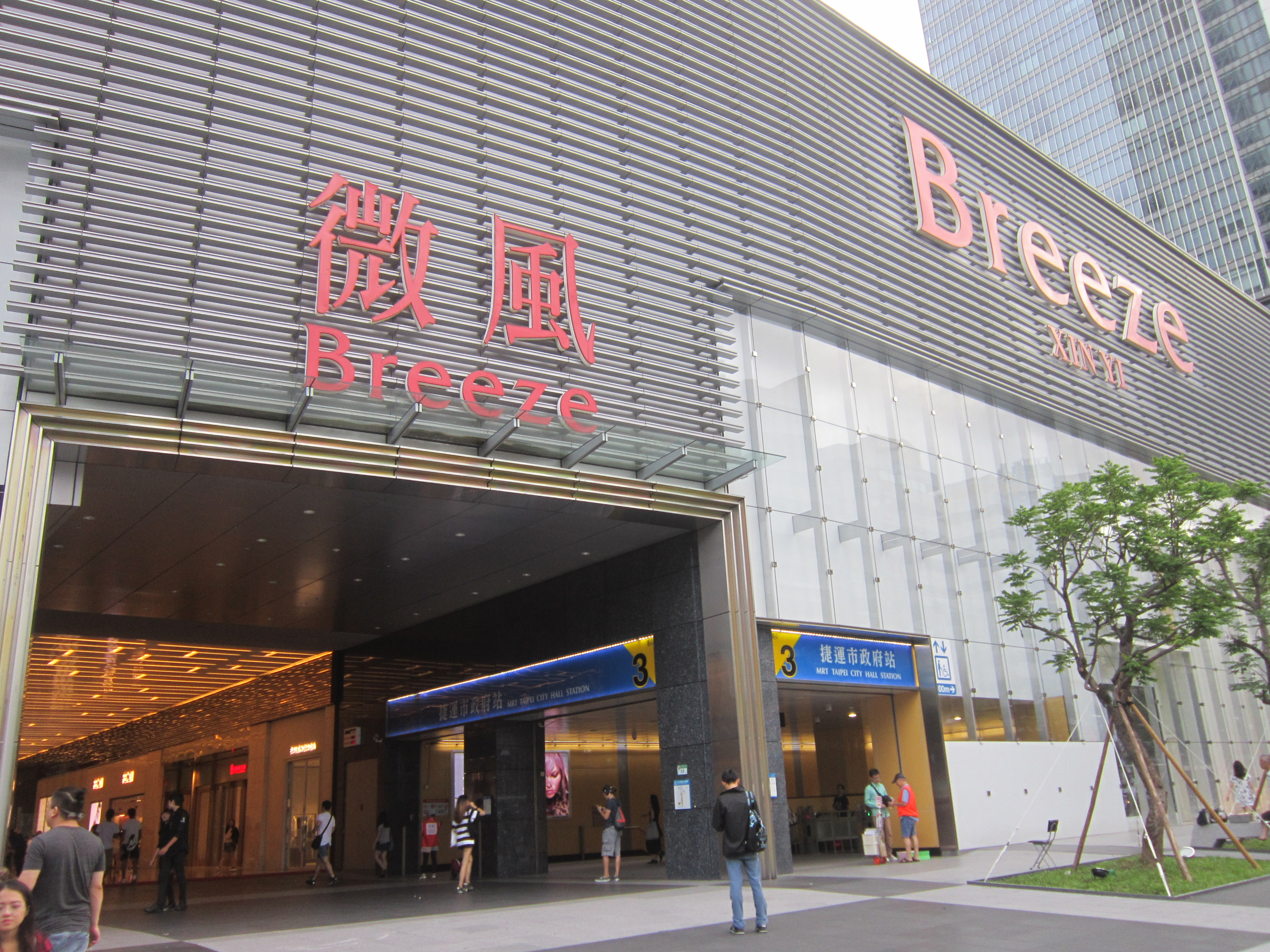
Exit 3 at Breeze Xinyi

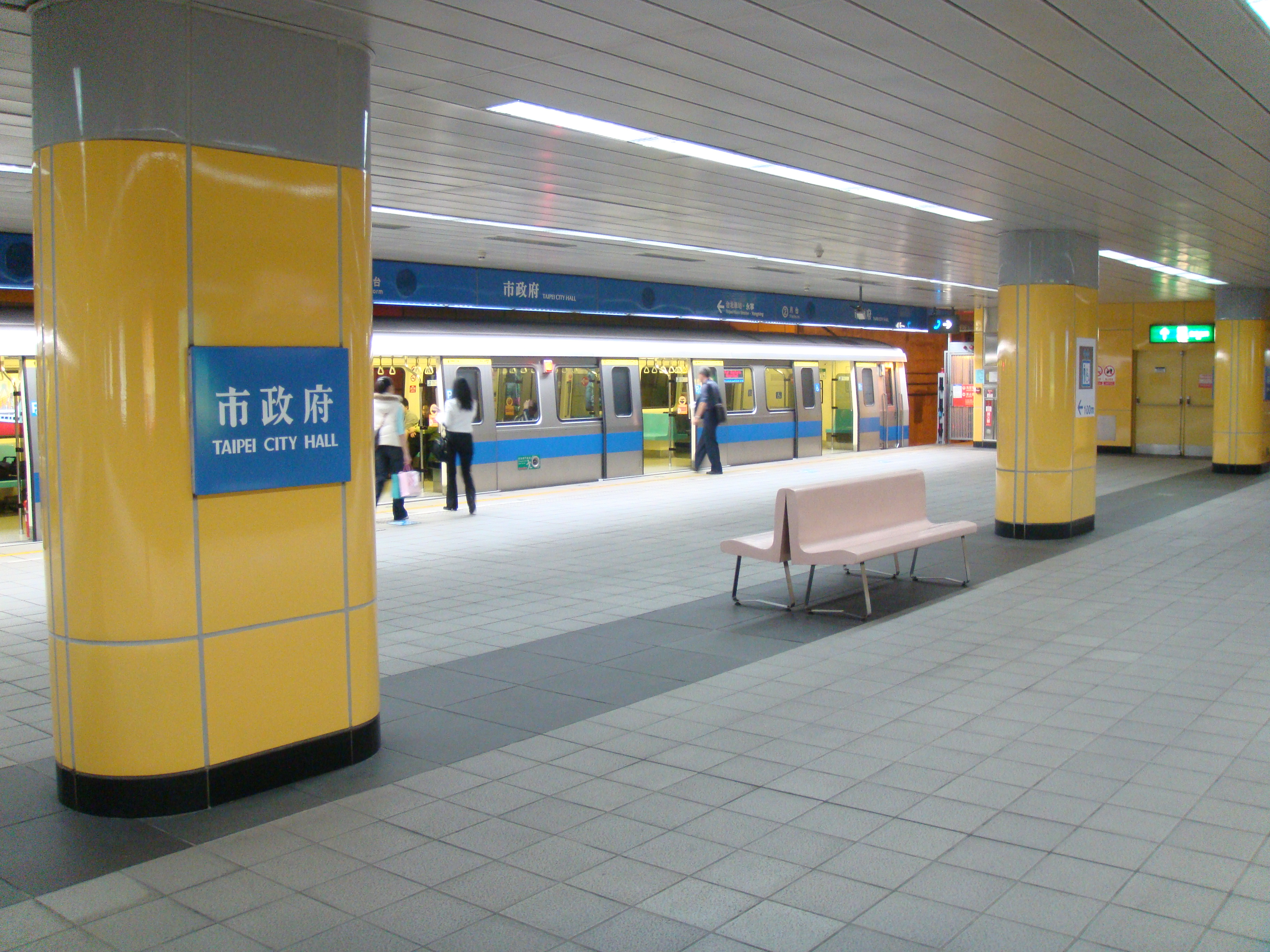
Platform prior to installation of platform gates

This two-level, underground station has an island platform and four exits. It is larger than most other stations on the Nangang Line. The station is situated under Zhongxiao East Road, between Keelung Road and Songren Road. Washrooms are located outside of the fare area. Due to crowding during New Year's festivities, automatic platform gates have been installed at this station.

In recent years, the station has been renovated to connect it with a bus transfer station, mall, and hotel above. The Taipei City Hall Bus Station opened for service on 5 August 2010.

In February 2009, a 105.3 m (345 ft)-long vegetal wall was unveiled at the station for a two-month exhibition. It was expected to absorb 35.445 kg (78.14 lb) of carbon dioxide while releasing 26.094 kg (57.53 lb) of oxygen.

=== Public art ===
Numerous pieces of public art are situated in and around the station. A series of five sculptures (titled "Growth") are placed around the station. "Furrows" and "Push" (granite/marble) are located in entrance square, while "Sprout", "Twist", and "Sway" (bronze/aluminum statues) are located on the station platform.

== Station layout ==
Street level	Entrance/exit	Entrance/exit
B1	Concourse	Lobby, information desk, automatic ticket dispensing machines, one-way faregates, restrooms (west side, outside fare zone near exit 2)
B2	Platform 1	← Bannan line toward Nangang Exhib Center / Kunyang (BL19 Yongchun)
B2	Island platform, doors will open on the left
B2	Platform 2	→ Bannan line toward Dingpu / Far Eastern Hospital (BL17 Sun Yat-sen Memorial Hall) →

=== Exits ===
- Exit 1: Song Shan Senior High School／United Daily News Office
- Exit 2: Taipei City Hall Bus Station／Uni-Ustyle Department Stores, Eslite Bookstore, Taipei City Hall
- Exit 3: Xinyi Shopping District／Breeze XIN YI
- Exit 4: TCWC Children Home

== Operations ==
Because the station is underneath Zhongxiao East Road and near the newly developed Xinyi District, the Taipei City Hall station is one of the most widely used station in the Taipei Metro. In 2008, the station handled 86,967 passengers (entries/exits) per day. Since the opening of the Taipei City Hall Bus Station, daily ridership increased during November 2010 to 116,400, becoming the second-busiest station, only behind Taipei Main Station. To help with the large crowds during weekends and rush hours, the parallel Xinyi Line has been constructed. To cope with crowds during New Year's Eve celebrations, designated trains pass through the station without stopping.

The station is also a transit station for local and long-distance buses to Neihu, Sanchong, Xinzhuang, Luzhou, Jingmei, Muzha, Keelung, Taoyuan, Zhongli, Miaoli, and Taichung. A large bus transit terminal was constructed between the space of exit 1 and the United Daily News Office. The station also provides free shuttle bus transport to the Taipei 101 Financial Center and the World Trade Center during major exhibitions.

Ridership by years
Year	Daily ridership
2002	22,785
2003	23,892
2004	29,327
2005	30,608
2006	35,986
2007	39,379
2008	43,081
2009	43,633
2010	48,770
2011	58,390
2012	61,871
2013	64,606
2014	55,936
2015	56,764
2016	58,061
2017	59,947
2018	60,749

== Around the station ==
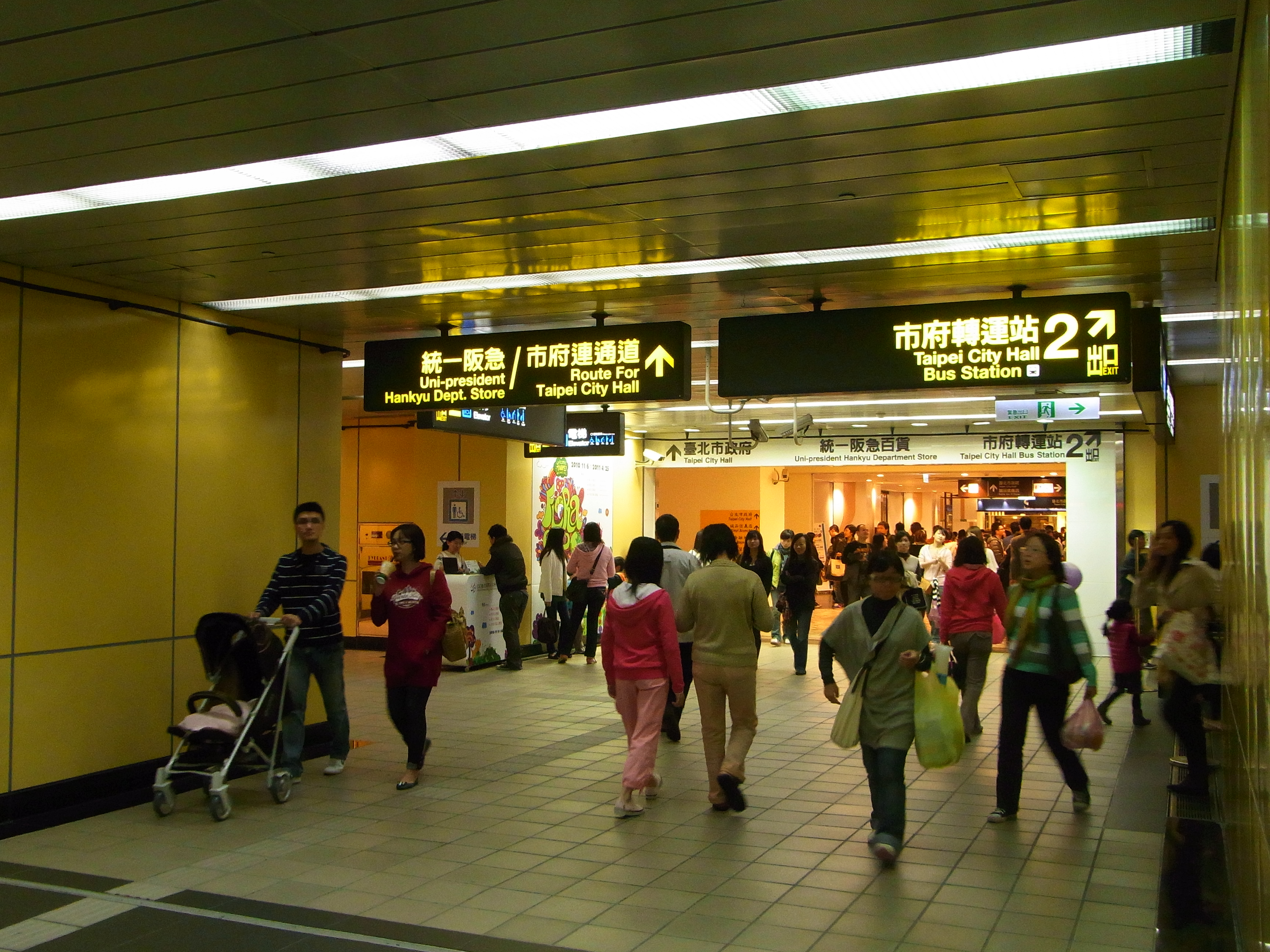
Underground passage connecting the station to Taipei City Hall and the surrounding buildings

=== Transport ===
- Taipei City Hall Bus Station

=== Government and financial organizations ===
- Taipei City Hall
  - Discovery Center of Taipei
- Taipei City Council
- Hong Kong Economic, Trade and Cultural Office
- Netherlands Trade and Investment Office
- Uni-President International Building
  - British Office Taipei
  - Canadian Trade Office in Taipei
- Criminal Investigation Bureau
- Taipei Songshan High School
- Financial Data Center, Ministry of Finance
- CPC Corporation
- United Cooperation International Headquarters
- United Daily News Office

=== Entertainment ===
- Songshan Cultural and Creative Park
  - Taiwan Design Center
  - Taipei New Horizon
  - Eslite Spectrum
- Uni-Ustyle Department Stores
- Breeze XIN YI
- BELLAVITA Shopping Center
- Eslite Xinyi Branch
- Shinkong Mitsukoshi
- VIESHOW Cinemas
- ATT 4 Fun
- Taipei World Trade Center
  - Taipei International Convention Center
  - Taipei World Trade Center International Trade Building
- Taipei 101
