= Raohe Street Night Market =

Night market in Songshan, Taipei, Taiwan

Raohe Street Night Market 饒河街觀光夜市
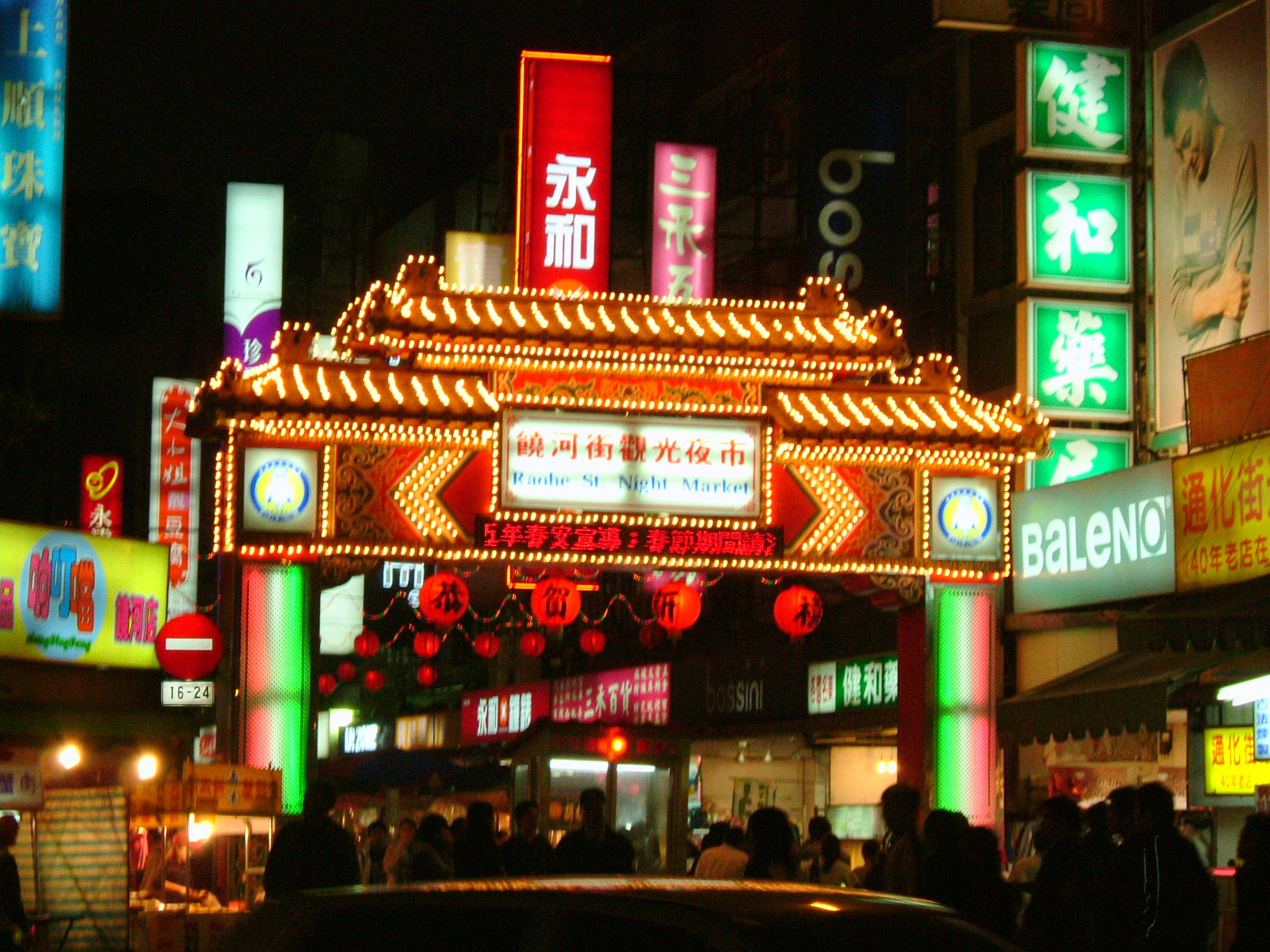
- Location: Songshan, Taipei, Taiwan; 25°03′00.6″N 121°34′21.5″E
- Environment: Night market
- Interactive map of Raohe Street Night Market

The Raohe Street Night Market (Chinese: 饒河街觀光夜市; pinyin: Ráohé Jiē Guānguāng Yèshì) is a night market in Songshan District, Taipei, Taiwan.

== Architecture ==
It is located on Raohe Street and is about 600 meters long. Ciyou Temple, which was founded in 1753, is one of the prominent landmarks in the area. The temple is located at the east end of the night market.

== Features ==
The first section of the market, located near the eastern entrance, features cart vendors selling many kinds of goods, such as daily essentials, toys, traditional artifacts, and street food.

The second section sells many kinds of physical goods, such as flower bouquets, precious stones, and folk art.

The third section is where most of the food stalls are located. Many types of Taiwanese cuisine, drinks and cut up fruits are found here.

There is a small rest area with seats on both sides of the market.

== Transportation ==
The night market is accessible within walking 100m (350ft) north of Exit 5 of the Songshan Station of the Taipei Metro.

== Around the market ==
- Songshan Ciyou Temple (next to the market)
- Rainbow Bridge (200m to the northwest)
- Songshan Market (250m to the southwest)
- Wufenpu Shopping District (600m to the south)
- Nansong Market (750m to the west)
- Yongchun Market (900m to the south)
- Yongji Market (900m to the southwest)

== See also ==
- Night markets in Taiwan
- List of night markets in Taiwan
