= Wufenpu =

Area of Taipei, Taiwan

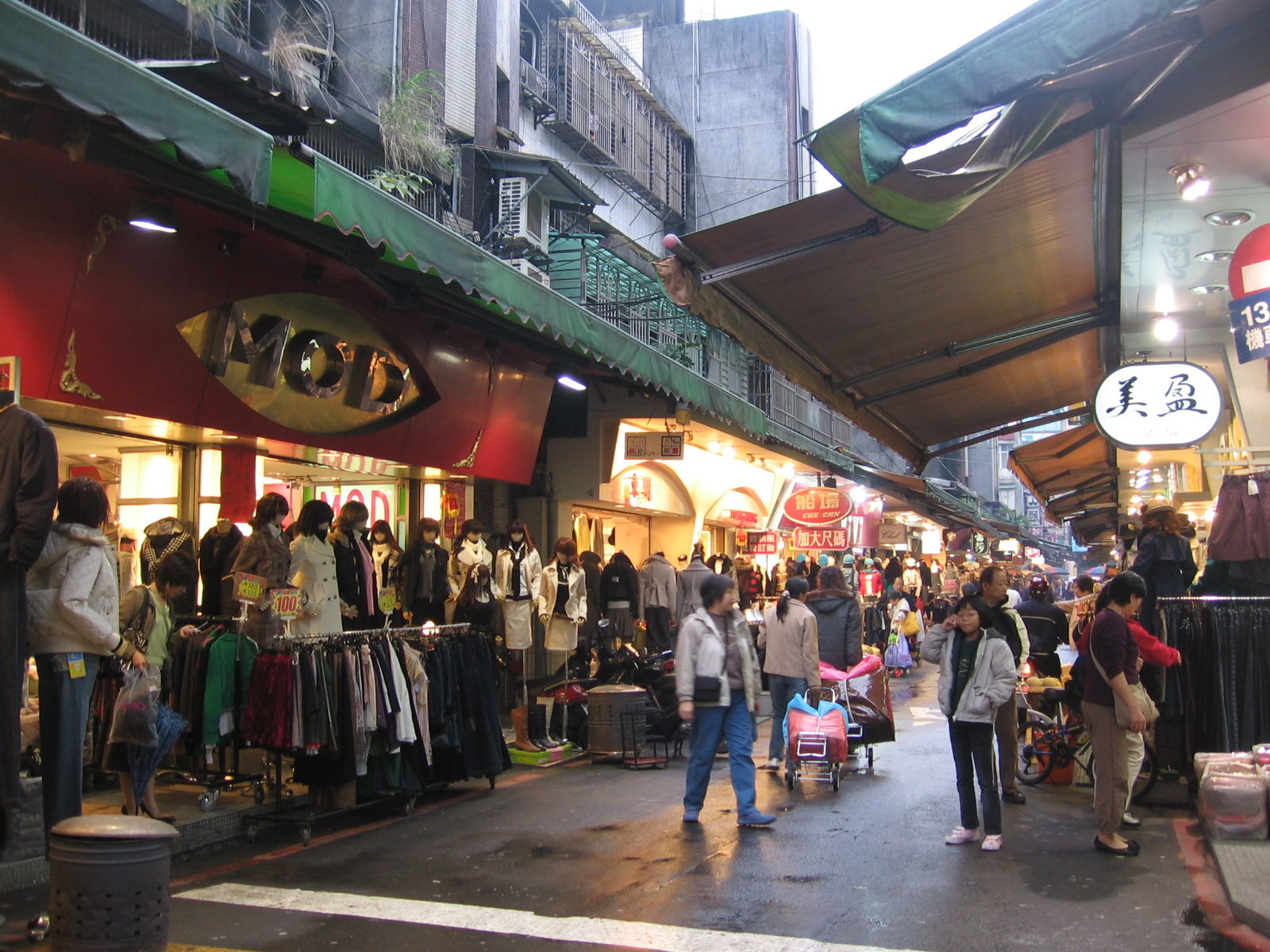
Shopping street scene in Wufenpu.

Wufenpu (Chinese: 五分埔; pinyin: Wǔfēnpǔ; Wade–Giles: Wu^{3}-fen^{1}-p'u^{3}; Taiwanese: Gō͘-hun-po͘) is an area, best known for wholesale garment market, located in the Xinyi District of Taipei, Taiwan. It is located at the foothill of Sishou Mountain (四獸山; lit. "Mountains of the four beasts") and includes all five neighborhoods in Section 5 of Zhongxiao East Road, east to Songren Road, and Zhongpo North Road. It is the largest clothing market in Taipei. The area is nearby both the TR Songshan Station and the Taipei Metro Houshanpi Station.

== History ==
During the Chinese Qing Dynasty, this was the land of the “Malysyakkaw” (a Ketagalan Taiwanese aboriginal tribe). In 1769, five families from Fujian Province, China bought this place from the Malysyakkaw, and that was how it got its name, (“Wu-fen-pu” means "land with five divisions"). Most soil in this area was too poor to farm; in addition, there were mental hospitals and pig farms built in this place and therefore it was thought to be the wasteland of the ignobility.

=== Development ===
Wufenpu was mainly in the countryside until 13 years after World War II. In 1958, there was a typhoon that caused a major flood in Taiwan, called “the Flood of August 7.” Taipei was almost underwater. To settle those veterans who were living in the neighborhood behind Taipei Station, the Taiwan Provincial Government donated an area in Wufenpu, and the Ministry of National Defense helped to construct 1,200 one-and-a-half-story temporary homes for the veterans.

In the 1960s, many people from Fangyuan (芳苑, a town in Changhua County, central Taiwan) noticed that it was easier to make a living in Taipei and came to rent houses from the veterans. They used the first floor as a pret-a-porter (ready-made clothes) shop and the second story as their houses and the tailoring place. After a few years, the veterans all sold their houses to these inhabitants from Fangyuan and many newcomers, and as of today Wufenpu is still a special pret-a-porter wholesale hub for clothes retailers in Taipei.
