= Global Mall Nangang Station =

Shopping mall in Nangang, Taipei, Taiwan

- 環球購物中心南港車站
- Location: No. 371, Section 7, Zhongxiao East Road, Nangang District, Taipei, Taiwan
- Coordinates: 25.053230455790146°N 121.60797733247665°E
- Opened: July 26, 2016
- Floor area: 8,580 m^{2} (92,400 sq ft)
- Floors: 2 floors below ground
- Public transit: Nangang station
- Website: https://www.twglobalmall.com/

Global Mall Nangang Station (Chinese: 環球購物中心南港車站) is a shopping mall in Nangang District, Taipei, Taiwan that opened on July 26, 2016. With a total floor area of 8,580 m^{2} (92,400 sq ft), the mall occupies levels B1 and B2 of Ruentex Nangang Station Complex. It is the seventh store of Global Mall.

== Gallery ==
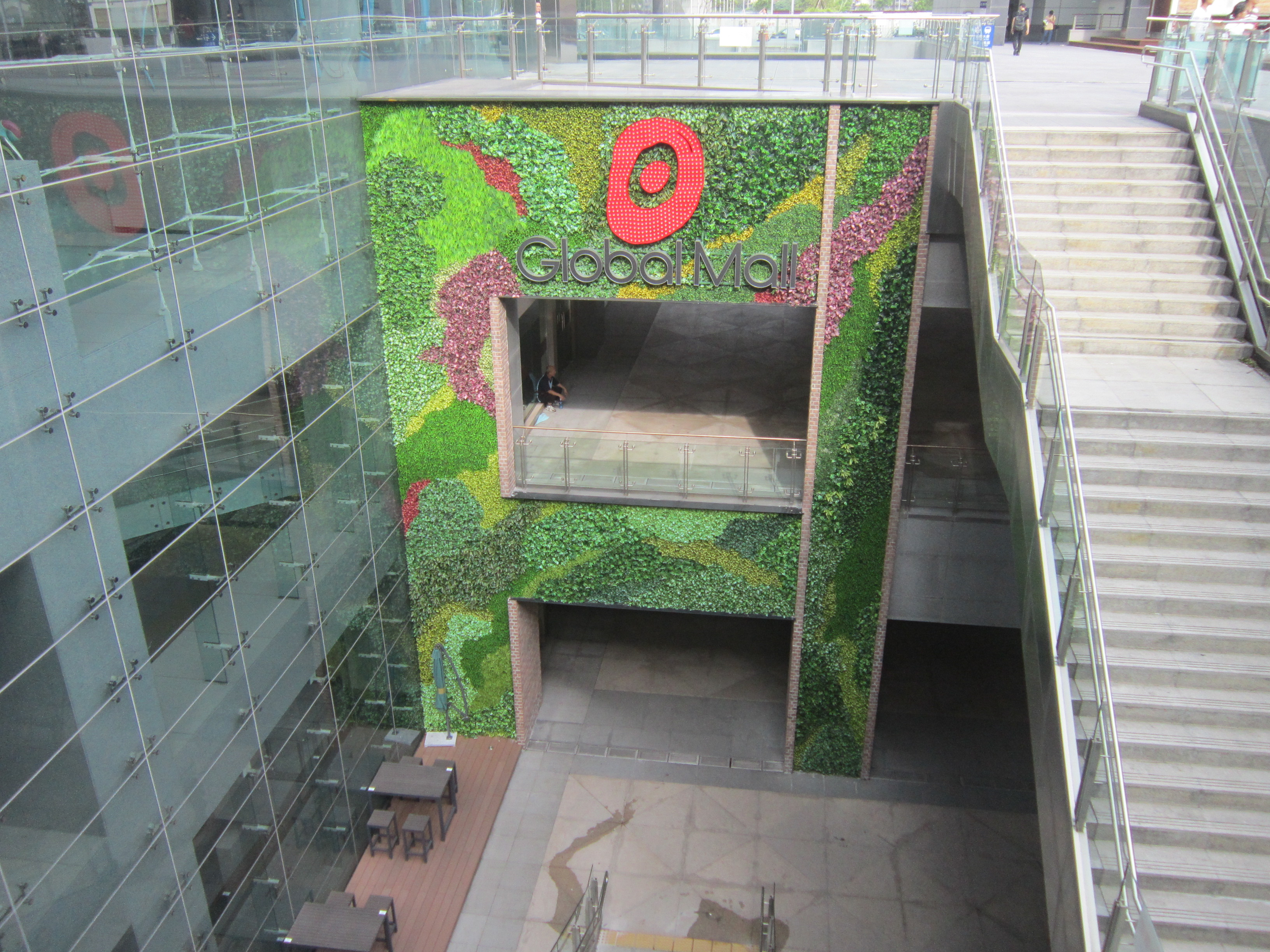
Entrance

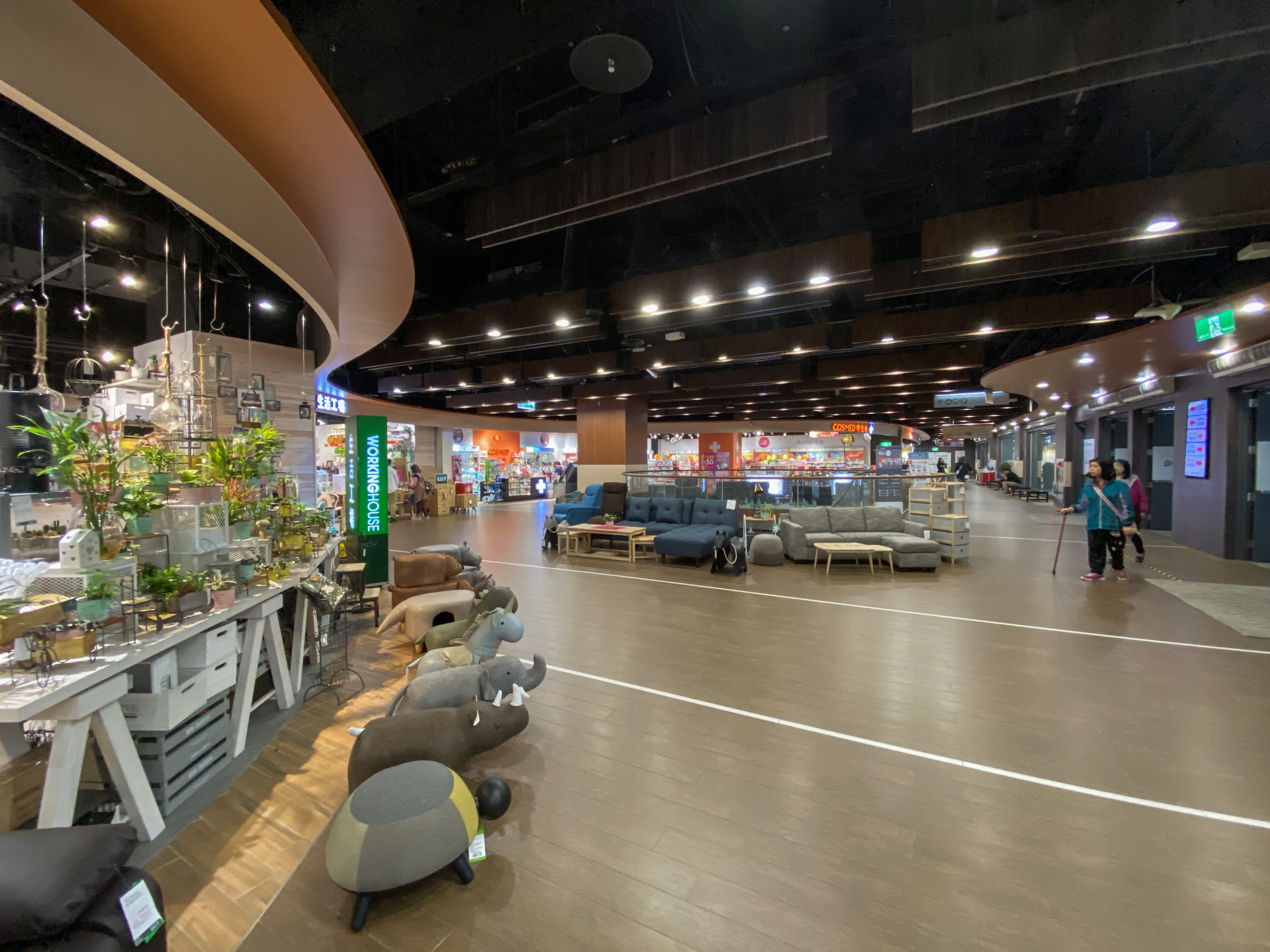
Interior

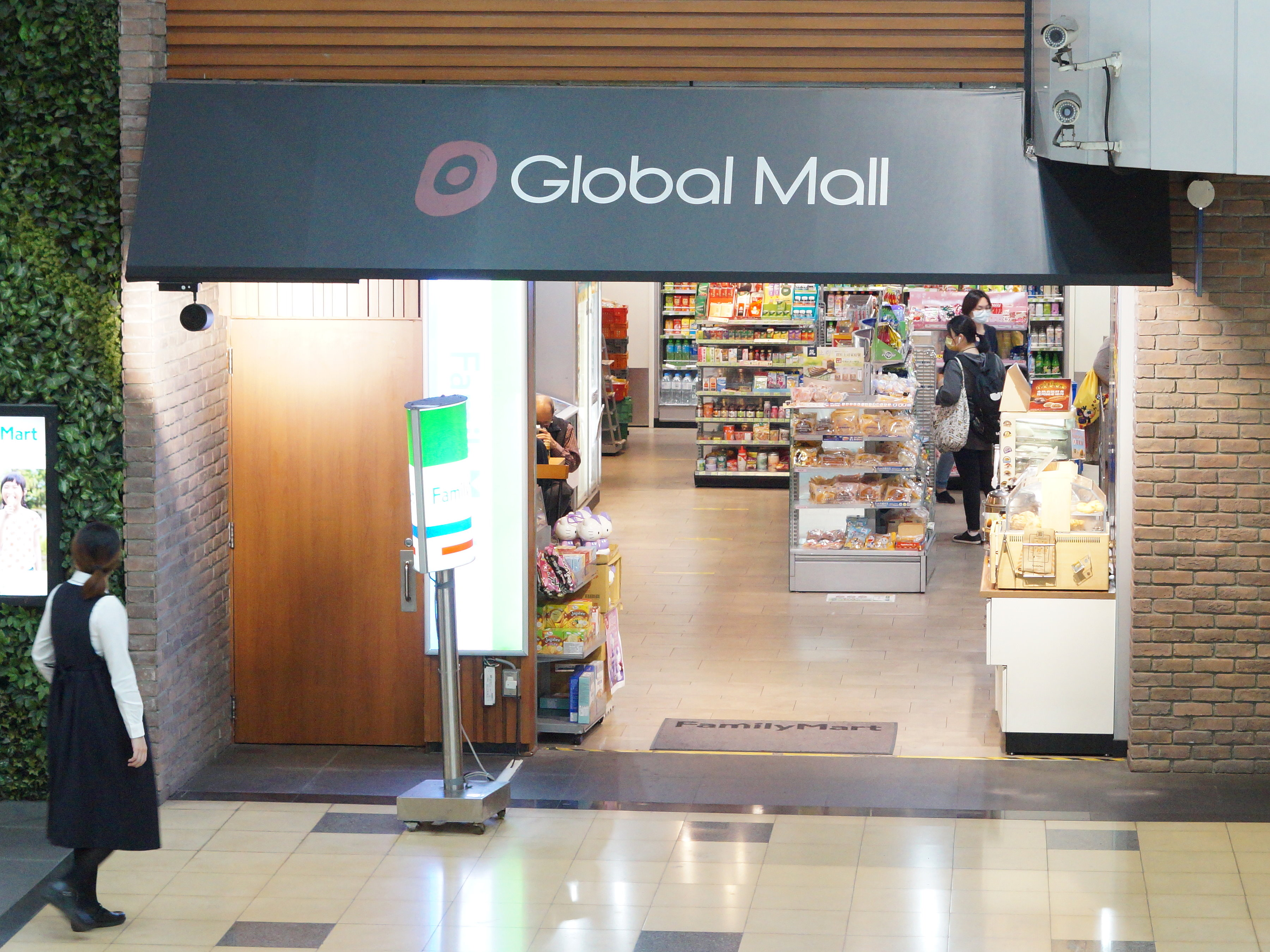
Family Mart

== See also ==
- List of tourist attractions in Taiwan
- Ruentex Nangang Station Complex
- Global Mall Taoyuan A8
- Global Mall Xinzuoying Station
- Global Mall Pingtung
- Global Mall Zhonghe
- Global Mall Banqiao Station
