= Ruentex Nangang Station Complex =

Skyscraper complex in Nangang, Taipei, Taiwan

- 潤泰南港車站大樓
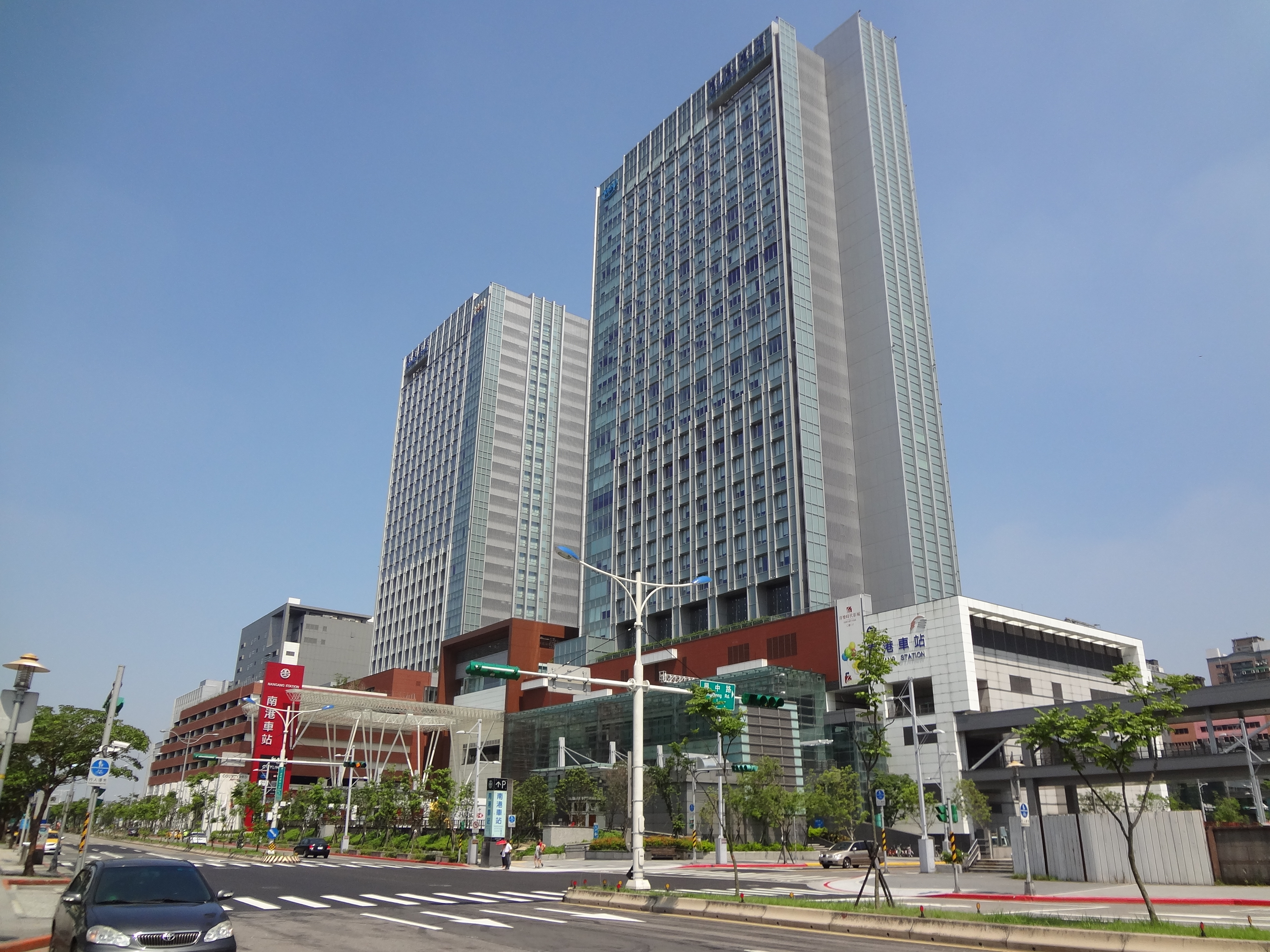
- Interactive map of the Ruentex Nangang Station Complex area

General information
- Status: Completed
- Type: office building, shopping mall, hotel
- Location: No. 357, Section 7, Zhongxiao East Road, Nangang District, Taipei, Taiwan
- Coordinates: 25.056875606731367°N 121.60807443285798°E
- Construction started: 2011
- Completed: 2014

Height
- Roof: 138.3 m (454 ft)

Technical details
- Floor count: 30
- Floor area: 133,751 m^{2} (1,439,680 sq ft)

Design and construction
- Architects: An-Hsien Lee Architects & Associates + Nikken Sekkei

The Ruentex Nangang Station Complex (Chinese: 潤泰南港車站大樓; pinyin: Rùn tài nángǎng chēzhàn dàlóu) is a set of twin skyscrapers located in Nangang District, Taipei, Taiwan. The buildings are each 138.3 m (454 ft) in height 30 floors above the ground, with a total floor area of 133,751 m^{2} (1,439,680 sq ft). The towers, designed by the Japanese and Taiwanese architectural teams Nikken Sekkei and An-Hsien Lee Architects & Associates, started construction in 2011 and were completed in 2014. The lower floors of the complex houses Nangang station.

Block A mainly contains offices. Levels 7 to 8 houses OBI Pharma, Inc.; levels 9 to 16 houses HSBC Taiwan and Intel Taiwan branch occupies the 17th to 30th floors. Block B houses Courtyard Taipei, a Courtyard by Marriott hotel, from the 7th to 30th floors.

== Gallery ==
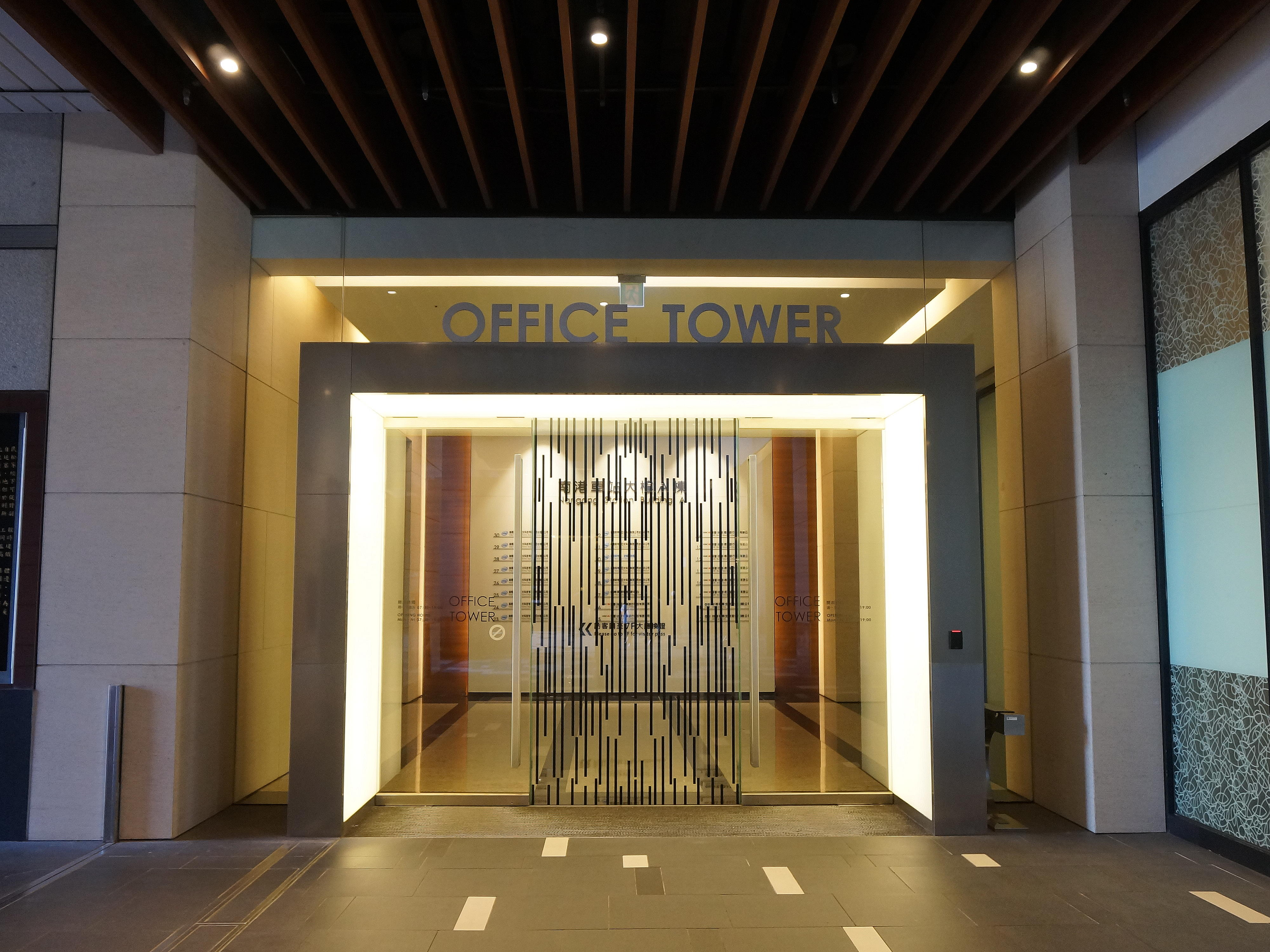
Block A Entrance

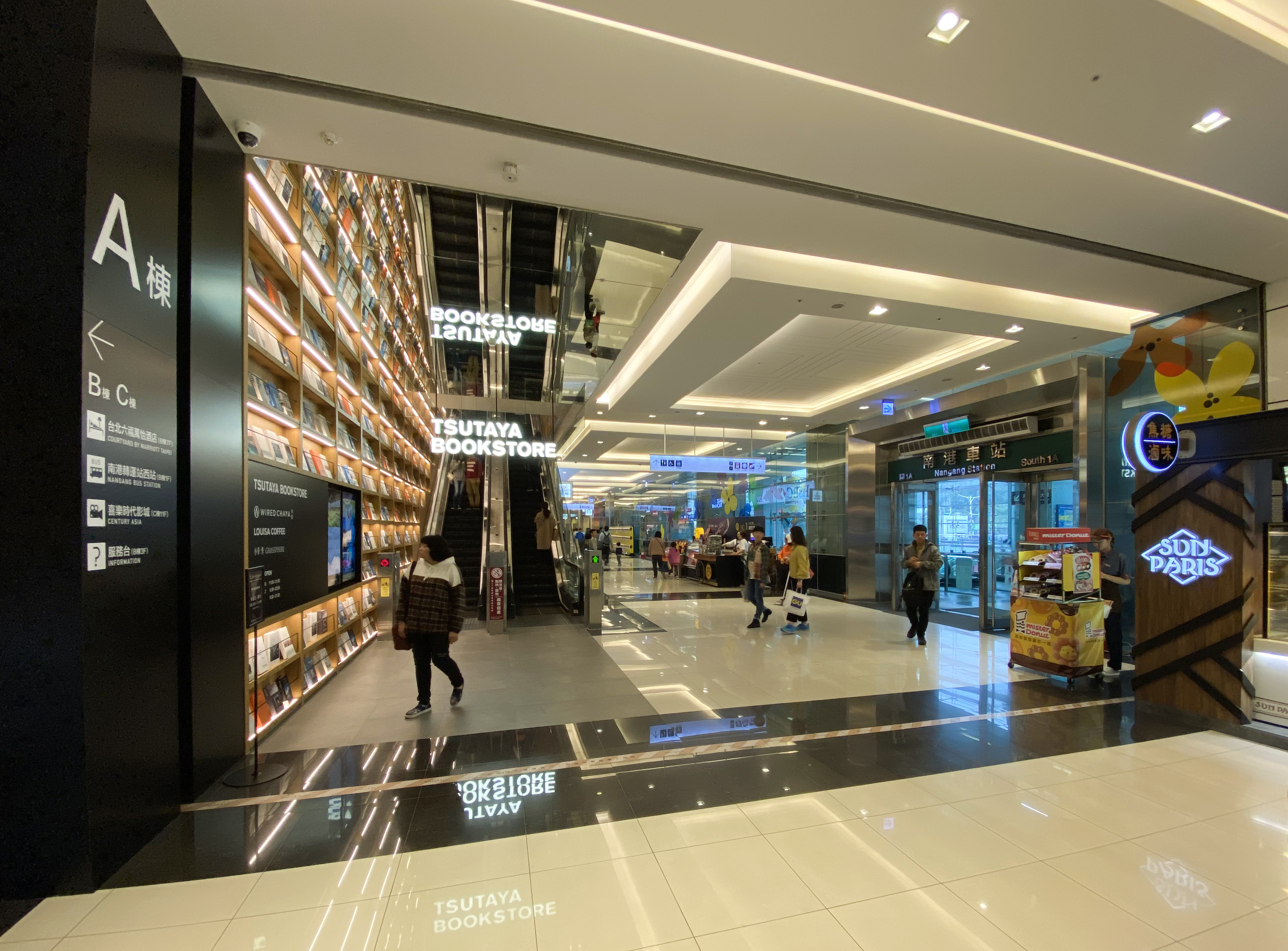
Block A Entrance

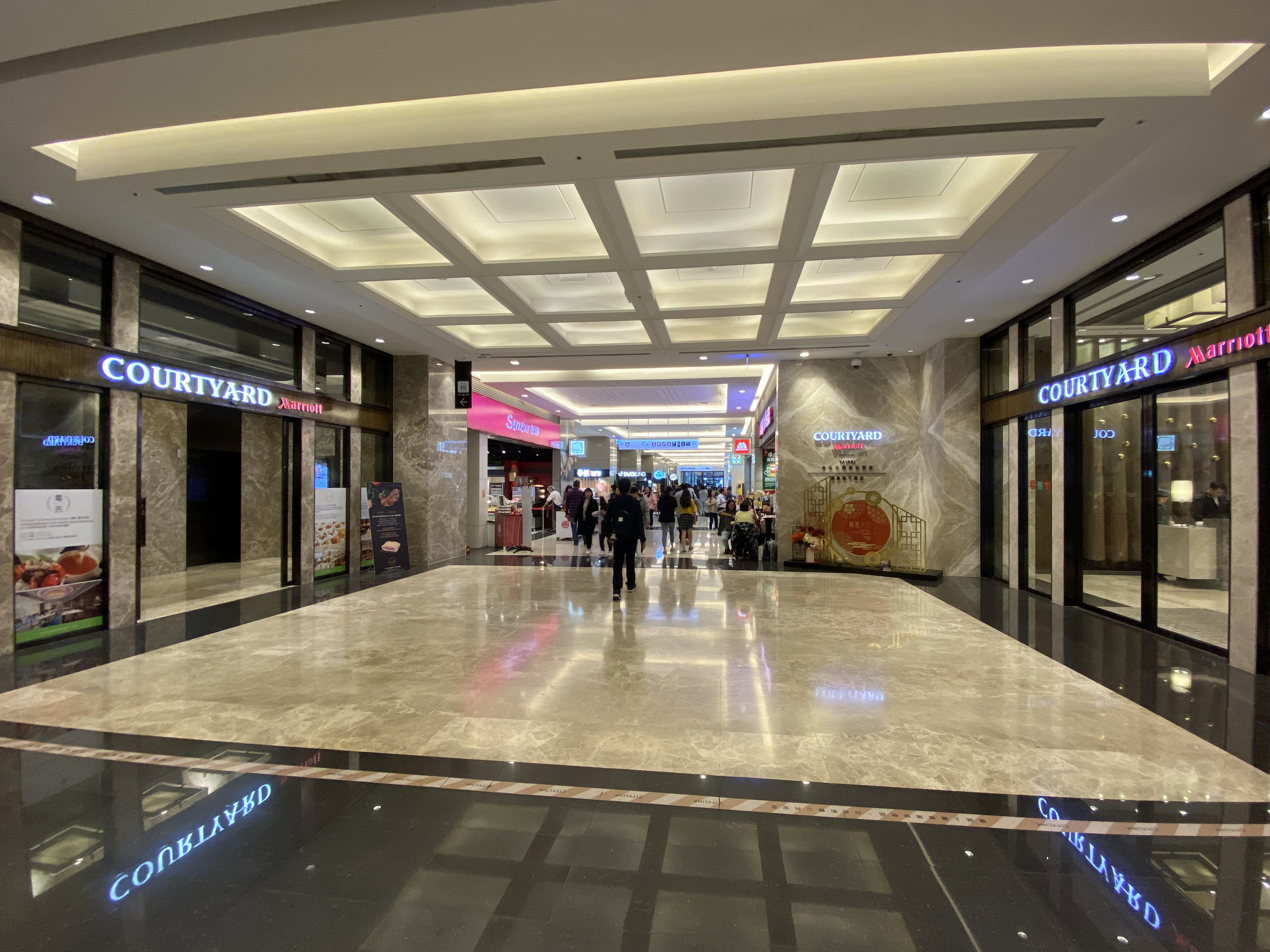
Block B Entrance

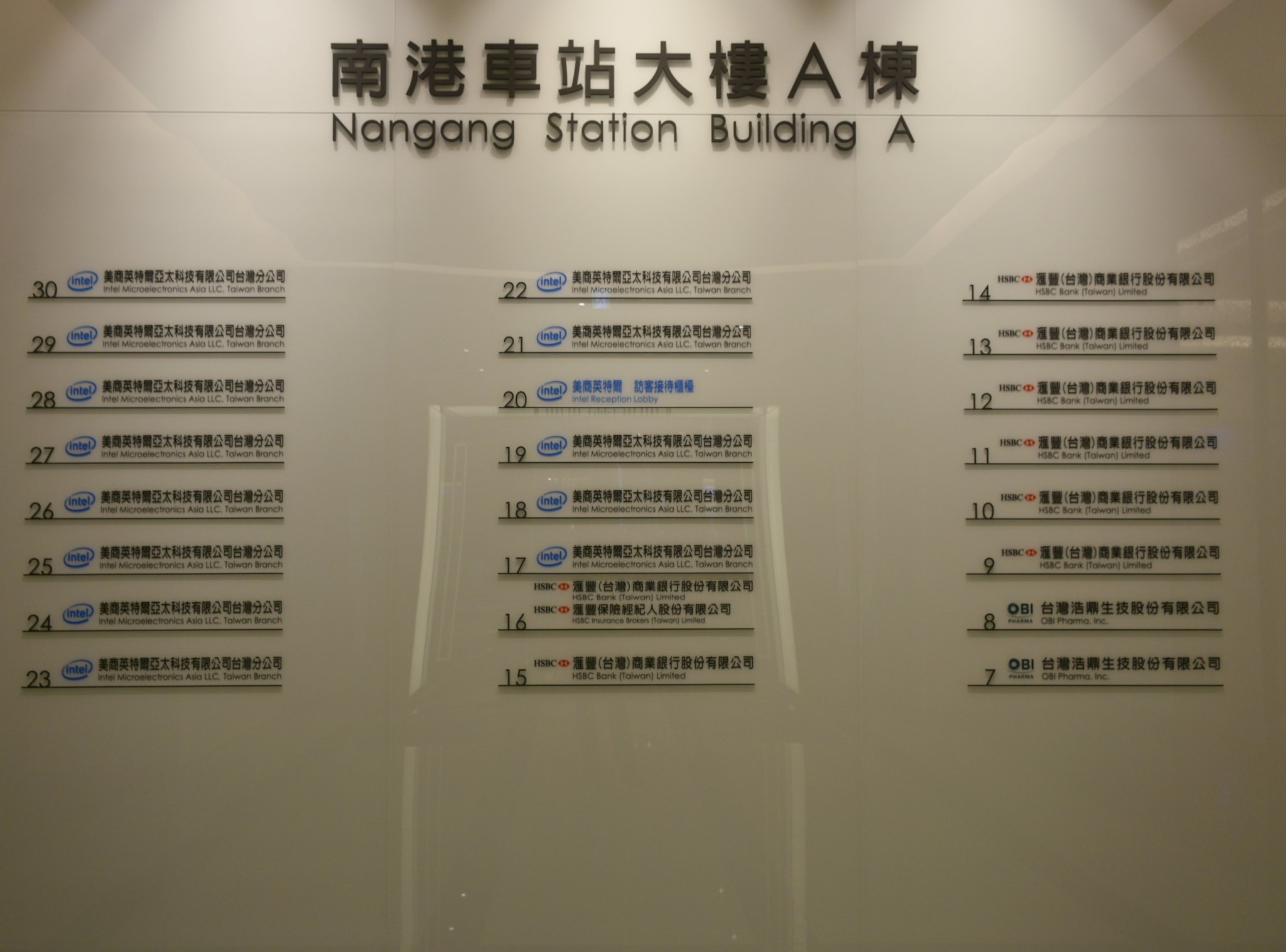
Office List in Block A

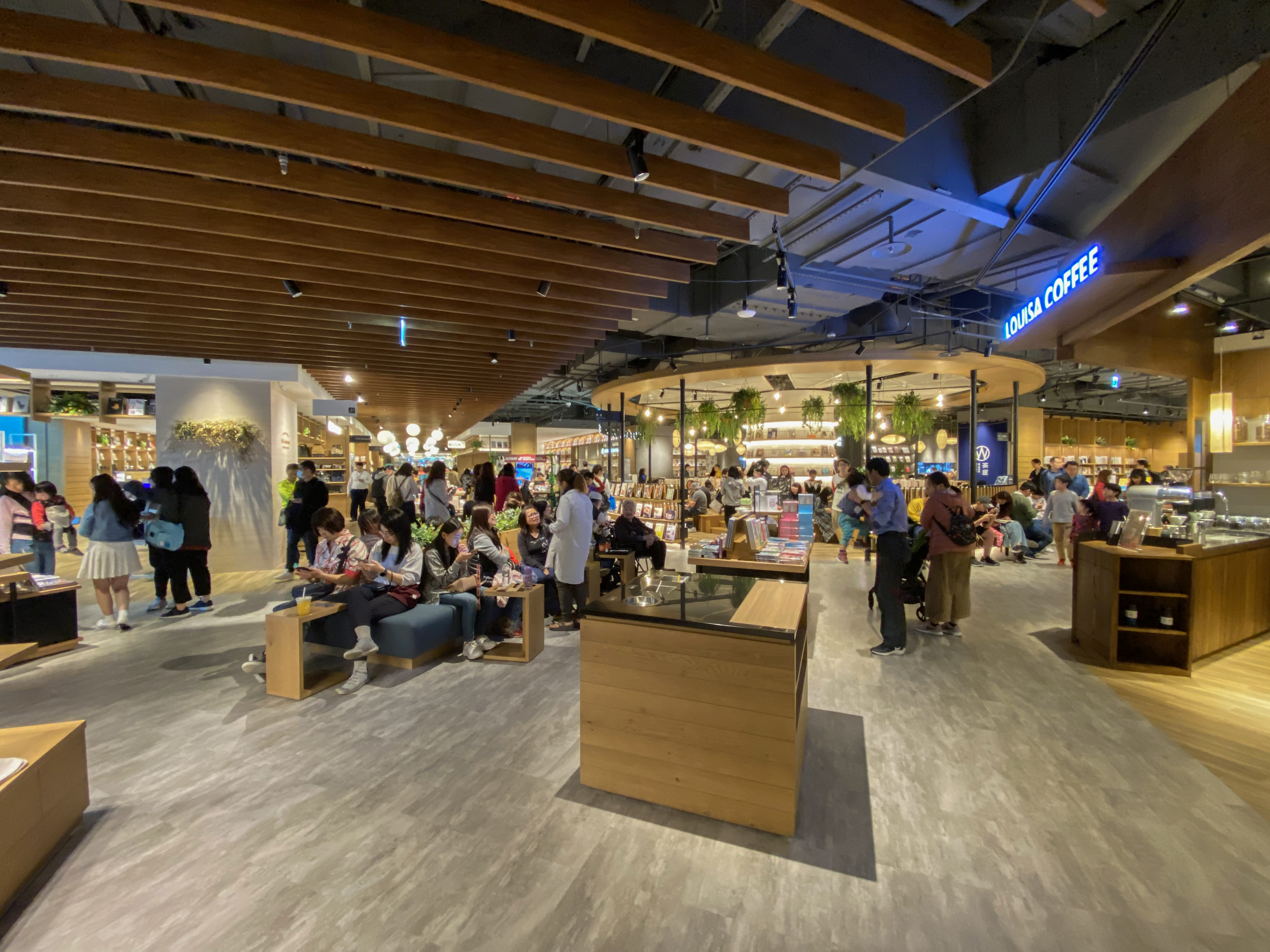
Tsutaya Bookstore on level 1 of Block A

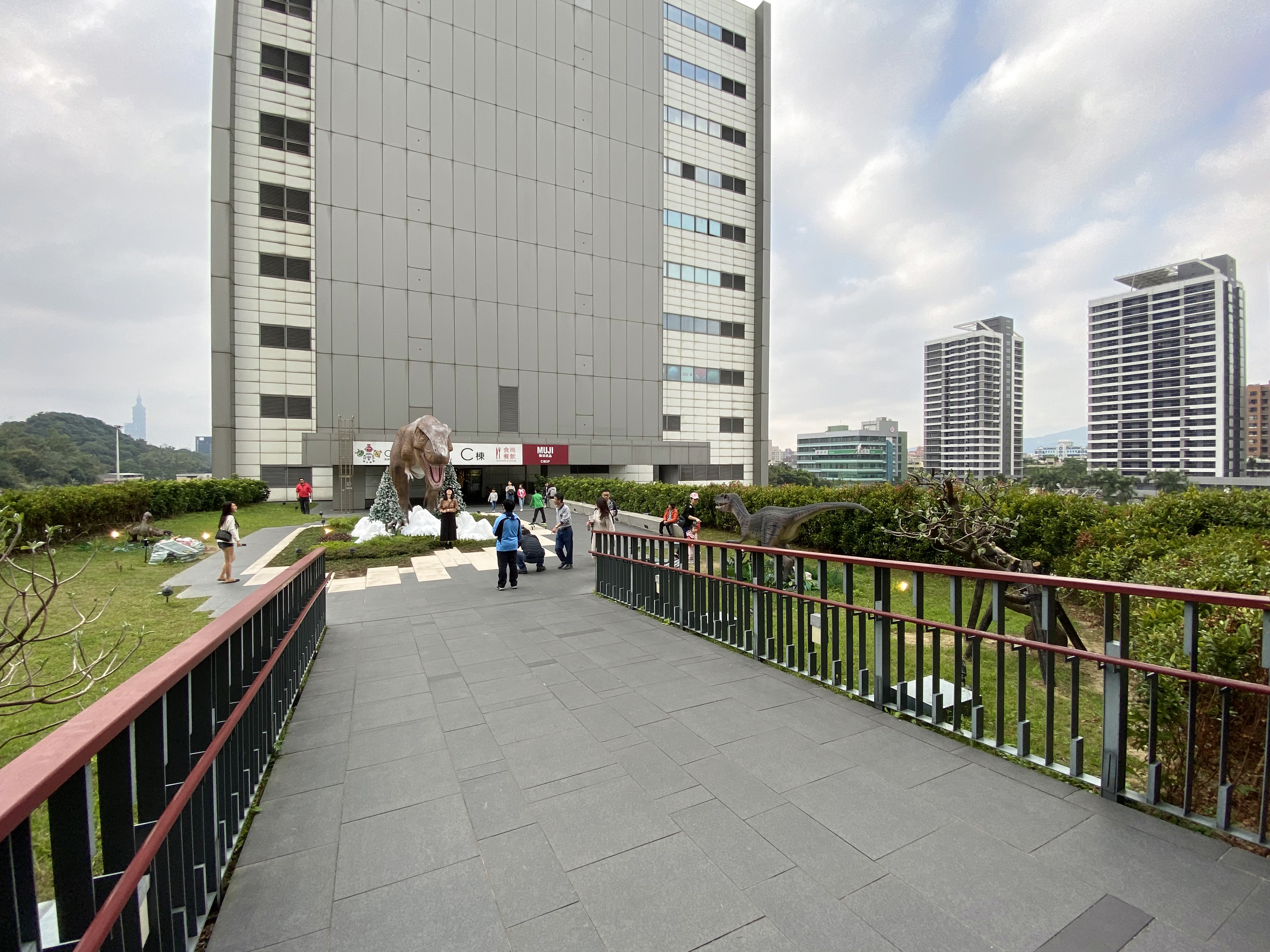
Level 3 podium

== See also ==
- List of tallest buildings in Taiwan
- List of tallest buildings in Taipei
- Nangang District, Taipei
- Courtyard by Marriott
- Nangang station
- Global Mall Nangang Station
- Ruentex City Park
