= NBRP =

NBRP may refer to:

- National Biotechnology Research Park
- Nisei Baseball Research Project
