= National Laboratory Animal Center =

Research institute in Taipei, Taiwan

National Laboratory Animal Center 國家實驗動物中心
- Established: 1994
- Owner: National Applied Research Laboratories
- Location: Nangang District, Taipei, Taiwan
- Coordinates: 25.0461°N 121.6094°E

The National Laboratory Animal Center (NLAC; Chinese: 國家實驗動物中心) is a research institute in Taiwan which is part of the National Applied Research Laboratories.

== History ==
The National Laboratory Animal Center was established in 1994 as the first large scale domestic supplier of specific pathogen free (SPF) laboratory rodents. In June 2003 it was brought under the umbrella of the National Applied Research Laboratories. NLAC supports Taiwan's biomedical industry.

In 2015 NLAC succeeded in breeding their first advanced severe immuno deficiency (ASID) mouse which they established a commercial line off of. The mice cost NT$3,000 to produce which was a significant savings over imported mice from the US and Japan which cost between NT$15,000 and NT$30,000.

== Facilities ==
In 2019 NLAC inaugurated a new NT$2 billion (US$64.64 million) research center built in Taipei's National Biotechnology Research Park. As well as being a research center the new facility also serves as a repository for the fertilized eggs of rare mice. As of 2019 the repository held 830,000 fertilized eggs.

NLAC operates a preclinical testing lab at the Hsinchu Biomedical Science Park and a preclinical animal care and surgery facility at the Southern Taiwan Science Park.
