= Hsinchu Biomedical Science Park =

Industrial park in Zhubei, Hsinchu County, Taiwan

Hsinchu Biomedical Science Park 新竹生物醫學園區
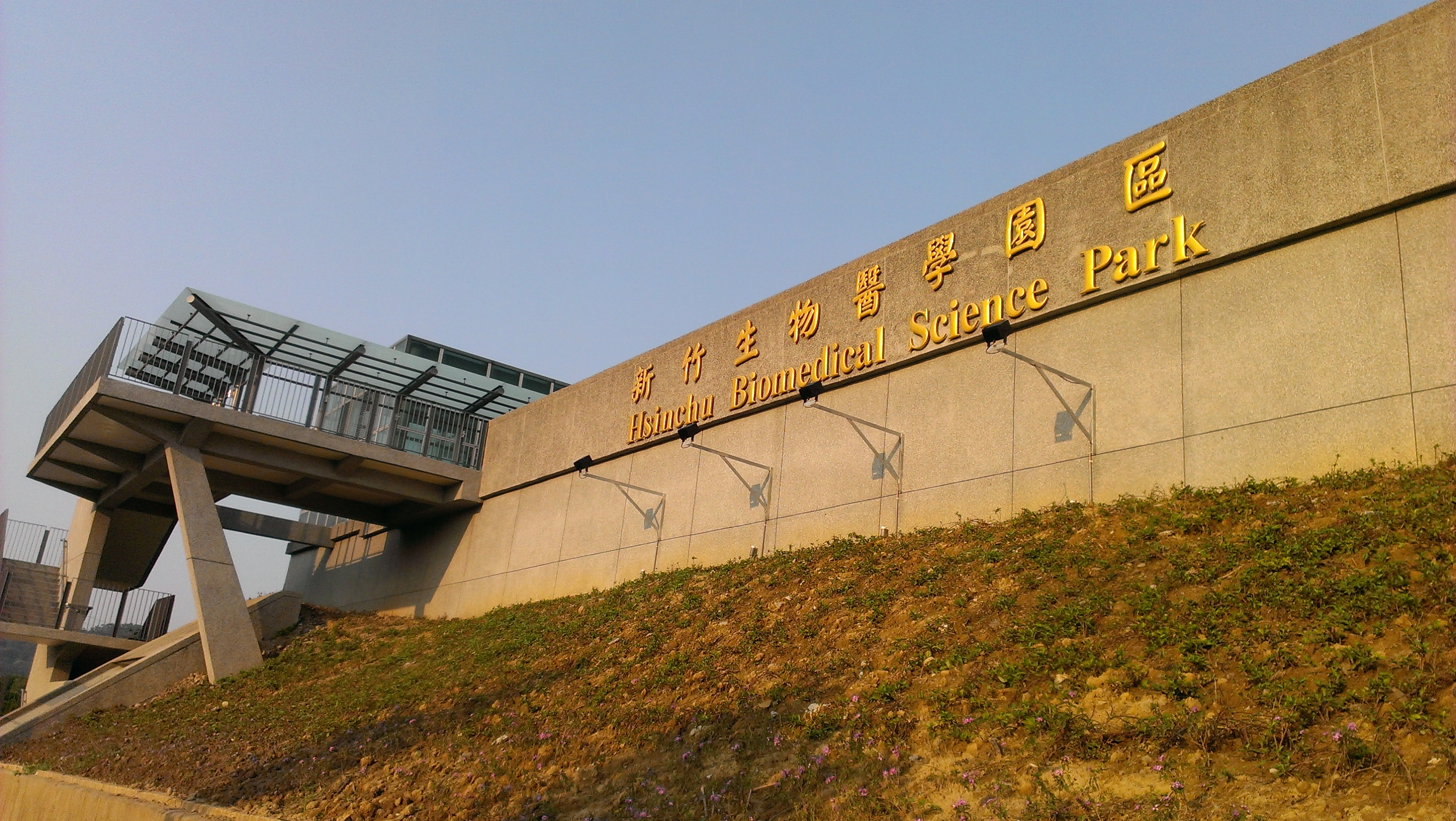

- Location within Hsinchu County
- Location: Zhubei, Hsinchu County, Taiwan
- Coordinates: 24°48′20.7″N 121°02′53.9″E
- Opening date: 16 December 2014
- Size: 38.1 ha (94 acres)

The Hsinchu Biomedical Science Park (HBSP; traditional Chinese: 新竹生物醫學園區; simplified Chinese: 新竹生物医学园区; pinyin: Xīnzhú Shēngwù Yīxué Yuánqū) is an industrial park in Zhubei City, Hsinchu County, Taiwan which is part of the Hsinchu Science Park.

== History ==
The project for the establishment of the science park was approved by the Executive Yuan on 28 March 2003, followed by the budgeting process, land acquisition, park planning and construction of the public facilities and biotechnology plant. It was opened on 16 December 2014.

== Architecture ==
The industrial park spans over an area of 38.1 hectares.

== Transportation ==
The industrial park is accessible within walking distance east of Hsinchu Station of Taiwan High Speed Rail.

== Tenants ==
- National Laboratory Animal Center
