= Nanxing Park =

Park in Nangang, Taipei, Taiwan

- 南興公園
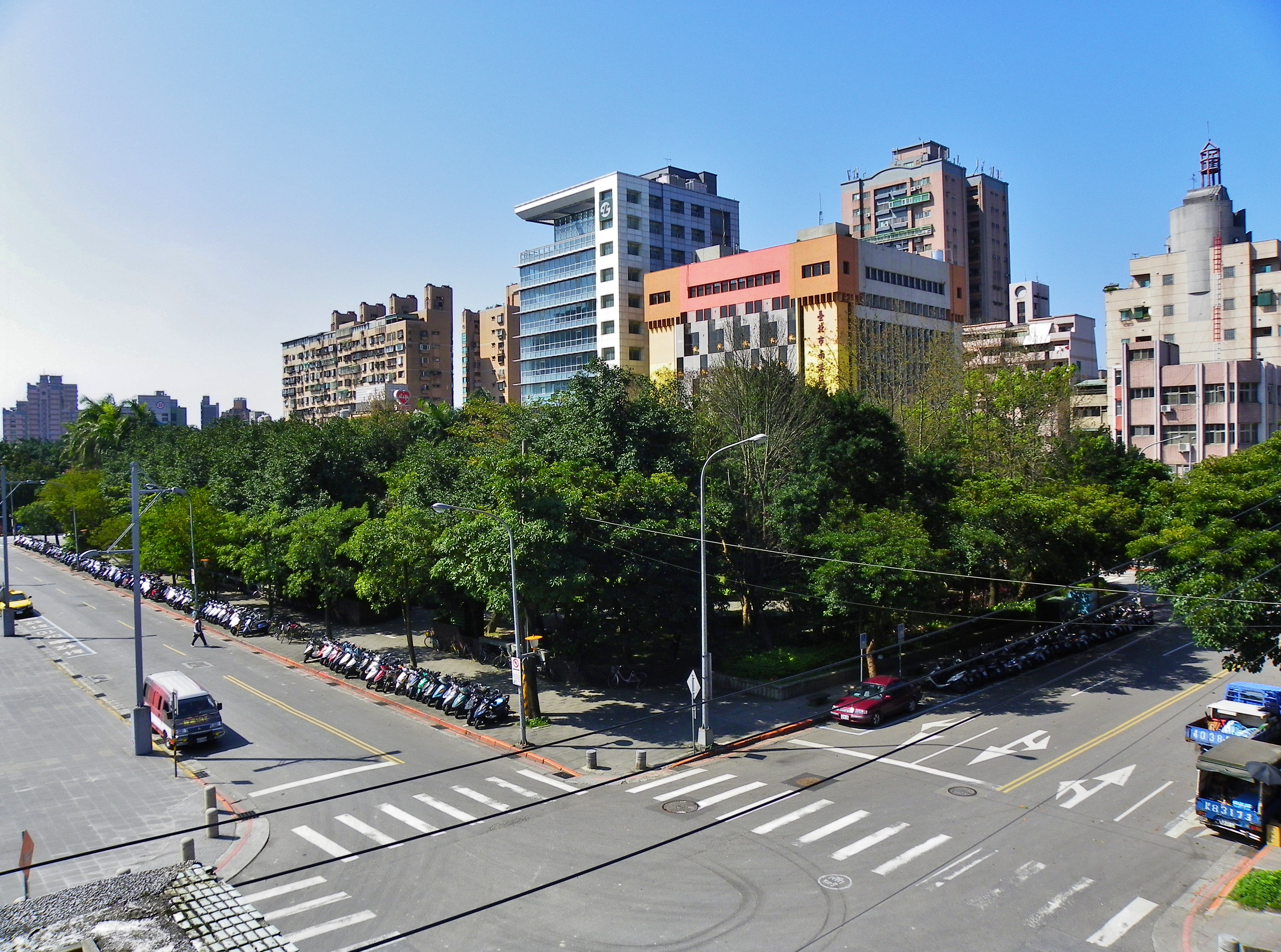
- Interactive map of Nanxing Park
- Type: urban park
- Location: Nangang, Taipei, Taiwan
- Coordinates: 25°03′14.9″N 121°36′24.8″E
- Opened: 1978
- Public transit: Nangang Station

The Nanxing Park (traditional Chinese: 南興公園; simplified Chinese: 南兴公园; pinyin: Nánxìng Gōngyuán) is a park in Nangang District, Taipei, Taiwan.

== History ==
The park was inaugurated in 1978 as a community park. In June 2018, the park underwent renovation and was reopened in October the same year.

== Transportation ==
The park is accessible within walking distance north from Nangang Station.

== See also ==
- List of parks in Taiwan
