= Nangang station =

Railway station located in Taipei, Taiwan

Nangang 南港
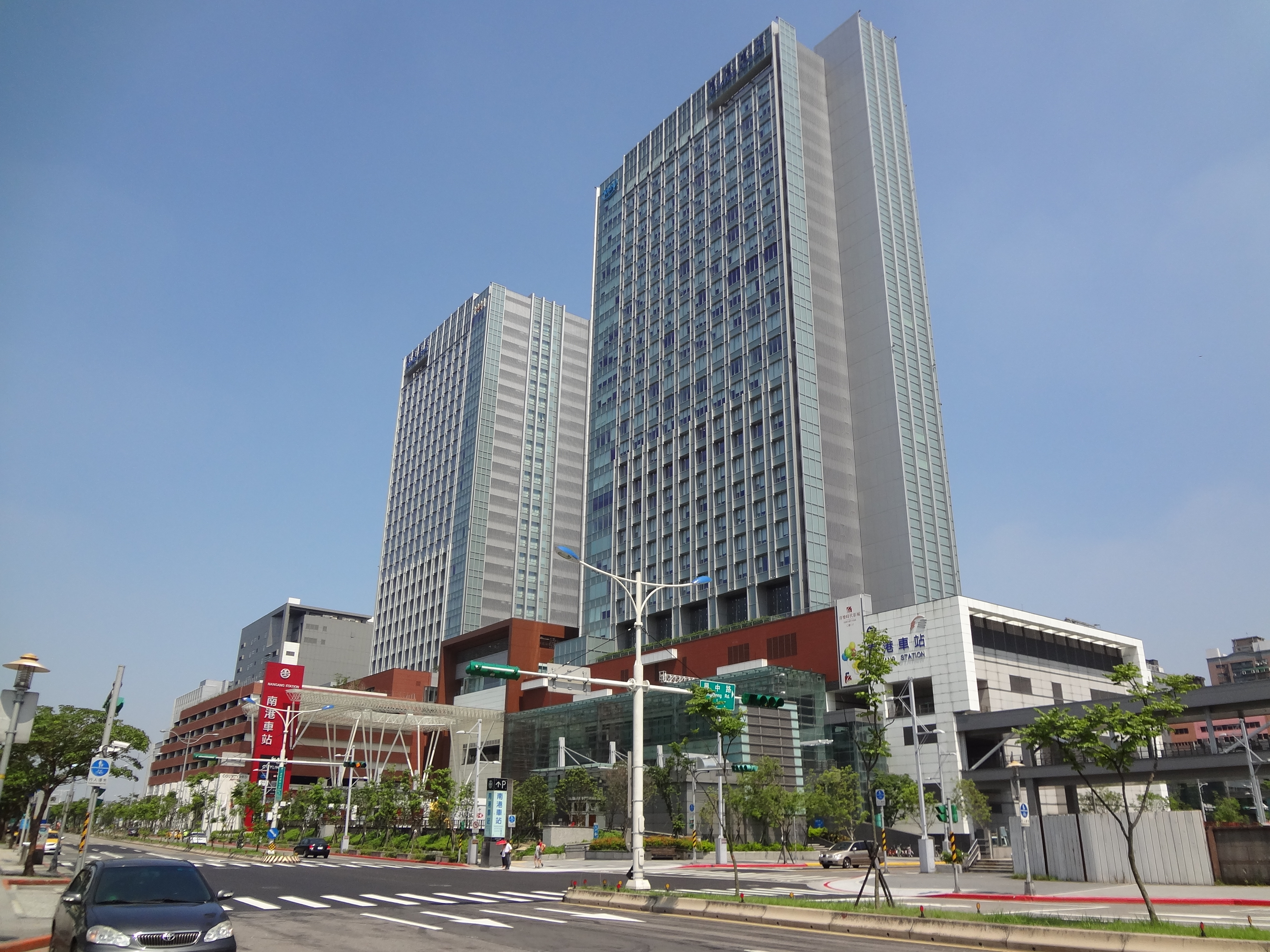

Chinese name
- Chinese: 南港
Transcriptions
Standard Mandarin
- Hanyu Pinyin: Nángǎng
- Bopomofo: ㄋㄢˊ ㄍㄤˇ
Hakka
- Pha̍k-fa-sṳ: Nàm-kóng
Southern Min
- Tâi-lô: Lâm-káng

General information
- Location: 313 Sec 1 Nangang Rd; Nangang District, Taipei; Taiwan
- Coordinates: 25.0529°N 121.6070°E
- System: THSR and TRA railway station
- Lines: THSR; Western Trunk line
- Distance: -3 km (THSR); 19.1 km to Keelung (TRA)
- Connections: Rapid transit; Local bus; Coach

Construction
- Structure type: Underground

Other information
- Station code: NAG／01 (THSR); 097 (TRA three-digit); A07 (TRA statistical); ㄋㄍ (TRA telegraph)
- Classification: First class (Chinese: 一等) (TRA)

History
- Opened: 20 October 1891
- Rebuilt: 21 September 2008
- Electrified: 9 January 1978

Key dates
- 1 July 2016: THSR opened

Passengers
- 2018: 4.715 million per year ▲18.38% (THSR)
- Rank: 9 out of 12
- 2023: 1,295,466 daily (2024) (TR)

Services
Preceding station	Taiwan High Speed Rail	Following station
Terminus	THSR	Taipei towards Zuoying
Preceding station	Taiwan Railway	Following station
Xike towards Keelung	Western Trunk line	Songshan towards Pingtung
Location
- Location within Taiwan

Nangang 南港
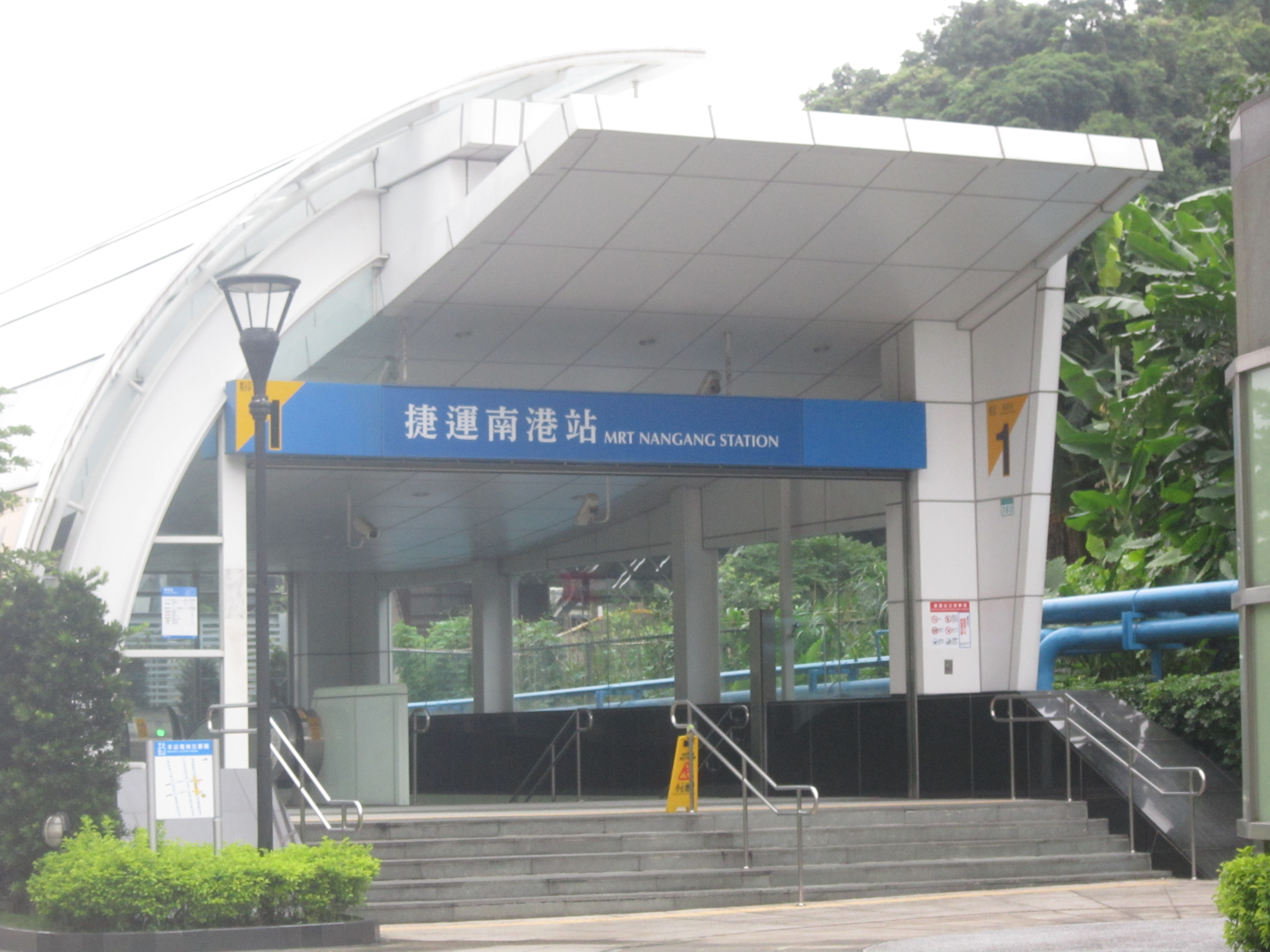
- Entrance 1

Chinese name
- Chinese: 南港
Transcriptions
Standard Mandarin
- Hanyu Pinyin: Nángǎng
- Bopomofo: ㄋㄢˊ ㄍㄤˇ
- Wade–Giles: Nan²kang³
Hakka
- Pha̍k-fa-sṳ: Nàm-kóng
Southern Min
- Tâi-lô: Lâm-káng

General information
- Location: 380 Sec 7 Zhongxiao E Rd; Nangang District, Taipei; Taiwan
- System: Taipei metro station
- Line: Bannan line

Construction
- Structure type: Underground
- Cycle facilities: Access available

Other information
- Station code: BL22

History
- Opened: 25 December 2008

Passengers
- 2017: 11.663 million per year ▲18.42%
- Rank: 50 out of 108

Services
Preceding station	Taipei Metro	Following station
Kunyang towards Dingpu	Bannan line	Nangang Exhib Center Terminus
Location

Nangang (Chinese: 南港; pinyin: Nángǎng) is a railway and metro station in Taipei, Taiwan served by Taiwan High Speed Rail, Taiwan Railways Administration and Taipei Metro. The station is served by the fastest HSR express services of the 1 series.

== History ==
Nangang Station was originally built during the Japanese rule of Taiwan in 1899 to support local industries and the growing population. Since then, the station has been upgraded three times to support tremendous growth: in 1905, in 1966 (due to the KMT moving the ROC government to Taiwan), and in 1986–1987 (to accommodate increased passenger traffic and new cargo traffic).

== Expansion ==
As with most urban train stations in Taipei, Nangang Station was converted from a surface station to an underground station as part of the TRA's Taipei Railway Underground Project, an effort to move existing surface railways from Songshan Station to east of Nangang Station underground to accommodate growing traffic and economic development in Nankang Software Park. Existing TRA platforms were successfully moved underground on 21 September 2008. The 7.6-km tunnel project cost NT$76.5 billion. The high-speed rail extension to the station opened for service in 2016.

The new station is similar to the then-new Banqiao Station in New Taipei, which was reconstructed to accommodate underground platforms and mixed-use development on the existing station site. The two-level, underground station levels accommodate expanded TRA platforms, new THSR platforms, and new MRT platforms for the Bannan line which was opened on 25 December 2008. It served as the eastern terminal until Taipei Nangang Exhibition Center Bannan Line platform opened in 2011. On 3 January 2010, Exits 3 and 4 for metro station were closed for construction of a passageway with the TRA station. The entire project was completed in February 2011. Platform screen doors were installed on the Nangang line platforms in August 2015.

== Public art ==
The design of the Taipei Metro portion of the station centers around a "Nostalgia and Technology" theme with aqua green selected to signify an image of a fish pond. Paintings by artist Jimmy Liao are displayed around the station including on the platform walls. Many areas have sandblasted glass installed. On the platform, a piece titled "Rapid Transit Platform, the Transport Dock" displays images on benches to evoke memories of former industries in Nangang.

== Station layout ==
30F-2F	Ruentex Nangang Station Complex	Global Mall Nangang Station; Citylink Mall; Courtyard Taipei
Street level	Street level	Entrance/exit, accessibility elevator, security, taxi stand
B1	Concourse level	Concourse, restrooms
B1	THSR platform level
B1	Platform 1A	THSR towards Zuoying (Taipei)
B1	Island platform
B1	Platform 1B	THSR towards Zuoying (Taipei)
B1	Platform 2A	THSR towards Zuoying (Taipei)
B1	Island platform
B1	Platform 2B	THSR towards Zuoying (Taipei)
B1	Platform 3A	THSR towards Zuoying (Taipei)
B1	Island platform
B1	Platform 3B	THSR towards Zuoying (Taipei)
B2	Lobby	TRA ticketing, automatic ticketing, ticket gate, waiting area Restrooms, travel information counter TRA counter, TRA manager's office
B3	TRA platforms	TRA control and traffic room, offices
B3	Platform 1A	West Coast line toward Keelung through service Yilan line toward Yilan, Hualien-Taitung (Xike)
B3	Island platform
B3	Platform 1B	West Coast line toward Keelung through service Yilan line toward Yilan, Hualien-Taitung (Xike)
B3	Platform 2A	West Coast line toward Taipei, Kaohsiung through service Yilan line toward Shulin (Songshan Station)
B3	Island platform
B3	Platform 2B	West Coast line toward Taipei, Kaohsiung through service Yilan line toward Shulin (Songshan Station)
B3	Platform 3A	Taipei-Yilan Direct line Not in service (toward Toucheng, Jiaoxi)
B3	Island platform
B3	Platform 3B	Taipei-Yilan Direct line Not in service (toward Toucheng, Jiaoxi)
B3	7th track	Public works use
B3	Side platform; administrative use only

Taipei Metro Nangang Station

Street level	Entrance/exit	Entrance/exit
B1	Lobby	Lobby, information desk, automatic ticket dispensing machines, one-way faregates
B1	Lobby	Restrooms (inside ticketed area)
B2	Platform 1	← Bannan line toward Nangang Exhib Center (BL23 Terminus)
B2	Island platform, doors will open on the left
B2	Platform 2	Bannan line toward Dingpu (BL21 Kunyang)→

== HSR services ==
Except Service 203, which departs from Taipei, Services 1334 and 696, which terminate at Taipei, and Services 583 and 598, which are local trains from Taichung - Zuoying, all other train services call at Nangang station. The fastest 1xx series travel from Nangang to Zuoying in 105 minutes.

== Around the station ==
- Academia Sinica (2.3km to the southeast)
- Nanxing Park (next to the station)
- National Biotechnology Research Park (1.9km to the southeast)
- Nangang Software Park (1km to the northeast)
- Carrefour Nangang Branch (700m to the west)
- Taipei Music Center (900m to the southwest)
- Taipei Municipal Nangang Vocational High School (250m to the north)
- Nangang Senior High School (1.2km to the southwest)
- Yucheng Junior High School (850m to the northeast)
- Nangang Elementary School (700m to the northeast)
- Dongxin Elementary School (850m to the northwest)

== See also ==
- List of railway stations in Taiwan
