= Nanhu Riverside Park =

Park in Taipei, Taiwan

Coordinates: 25°03′48.5″N 121°36′46.3″E

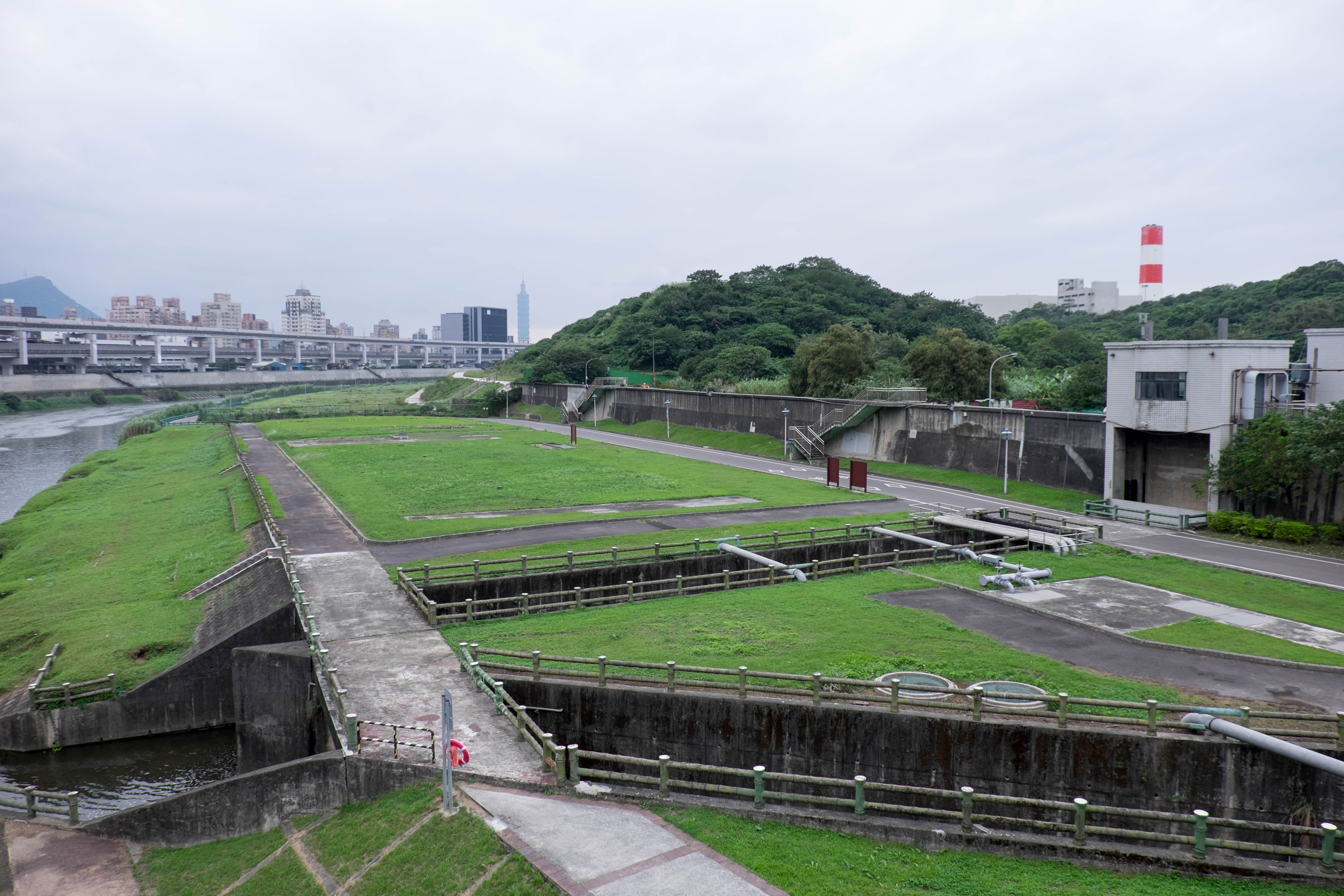
Nanhu Riverside Park northern side

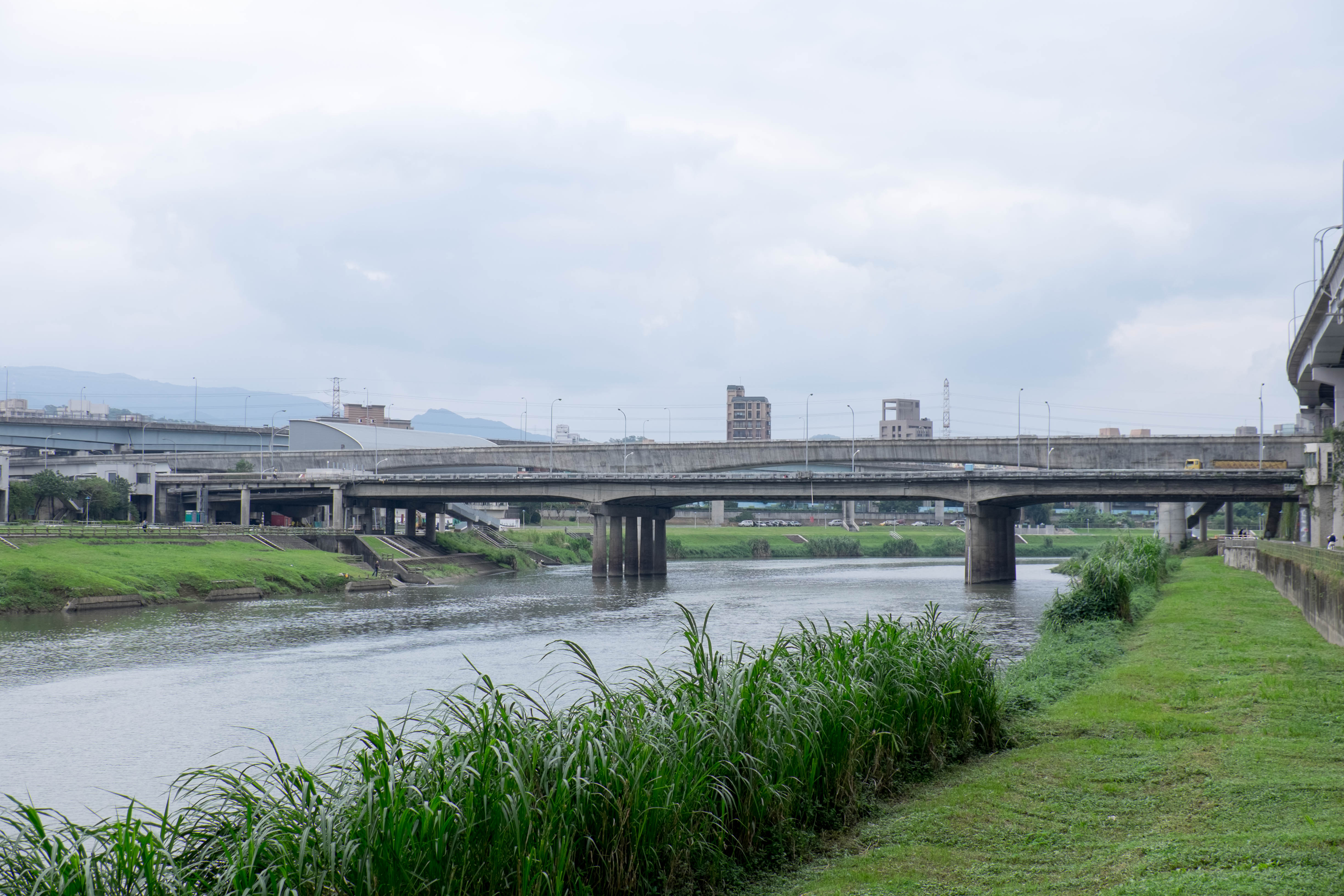
Nanhu Riverside Park southern side

The Nanhu Riverside Park (Chinese: 南湖河濱公園; pinyin: Nánhú Hébīn Gōngyuán) is a park along the Keelung River in Taipei, Taiwan. The park is divided into two parts by the river, the northern part which is located in Neihu District on the right side of the river bank and the southern part which is located in Nangang District on the left side of the river bank.

== Features ==
The Nanhu Bridge located within the park connects both sides of the park for traffic vehicles and pedestrians.

== Transportation ==
The park is accessible within walking distance north west of Nangang Software Park Station of Taipei Metro.

== See also ==
- List of parks in Taiwan
