= National Biotechnology Research Park =

Industrial park in Nangang, Taipei, Taiwan

National Biotechnology Research Park 國家生技研究園區
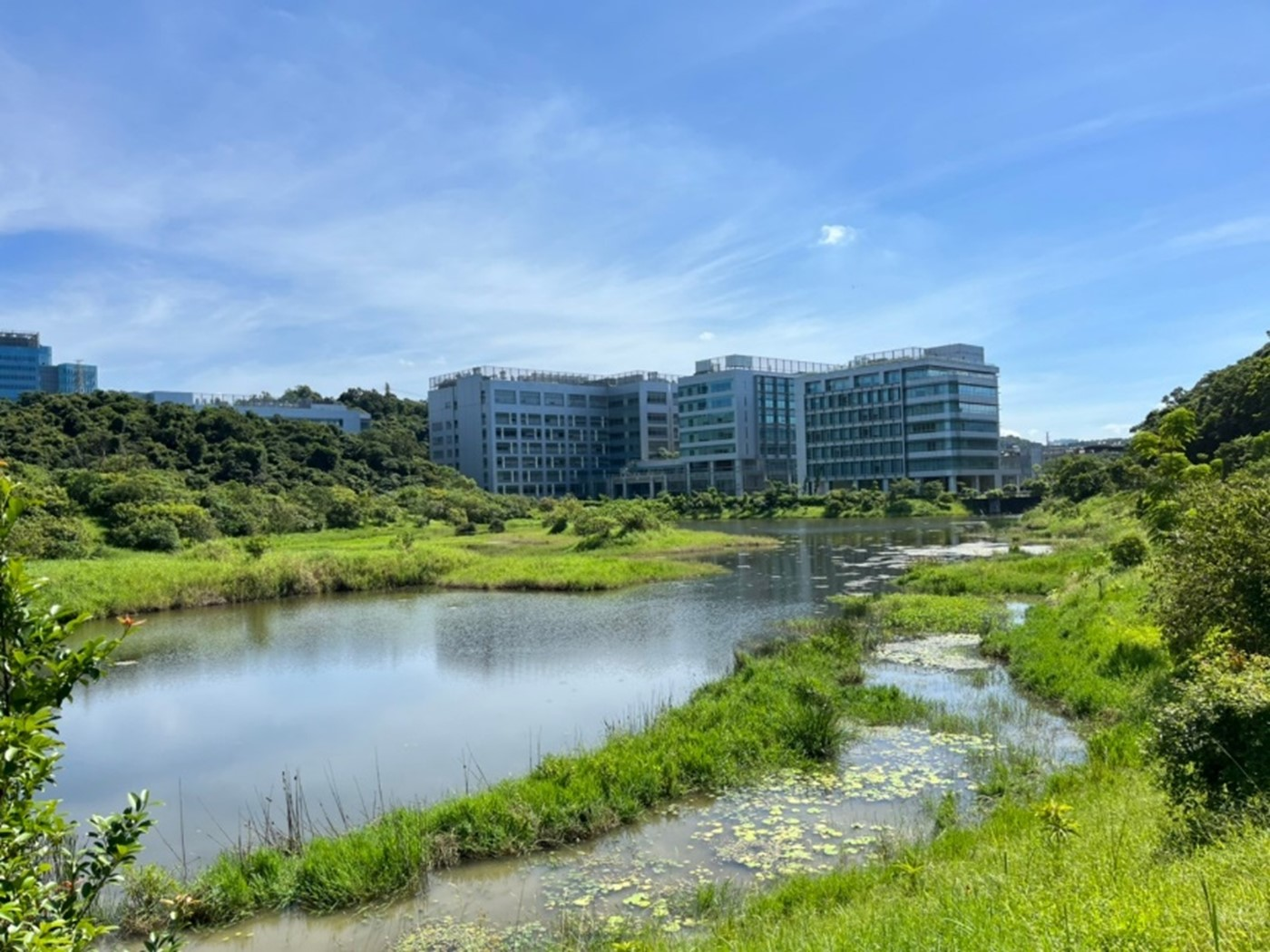

- Taiwan
- Location: Nangang, Taipei, Taiwan
- Coordinates: 25°02′51″N 121°36′37″E
- Opening date: 15 October 2018
- Construction cost: NT$22.5 billion
- Website: Official website

The National Biotechnology Research Park (NBRP; Chinese: 國家生技研究園區; pinyin: Guójiā Shēngjì Yánjiū Yuánqū) is an industrial park in Nangang District, Taipei, Taiwan.

== History ==
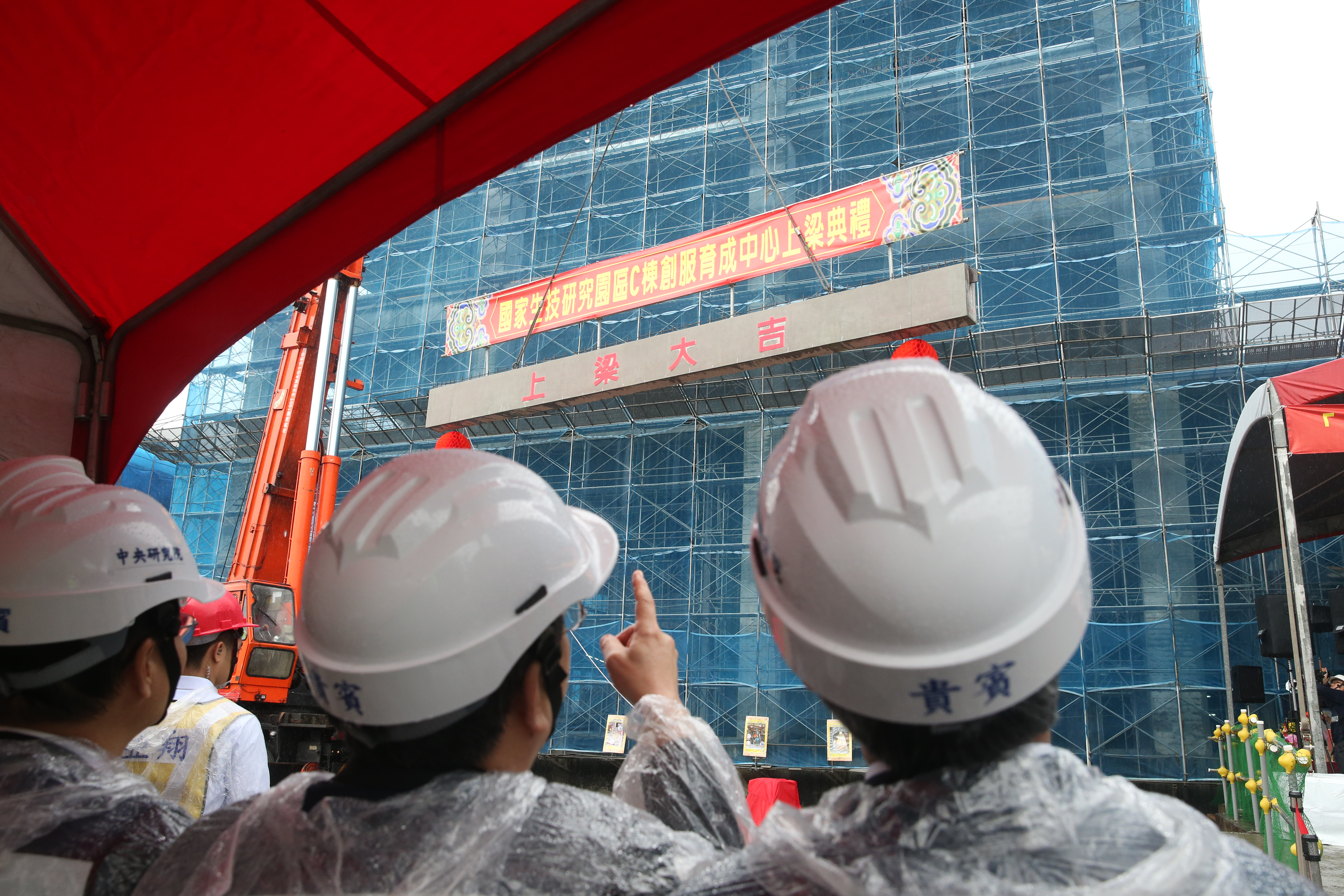
The industrial park under construction.

The area where the industrial park stands today used to be the site for the 202nd arsenal of Ministry of National Defense. Later on, the area was decided to be redeveloped into an industrial park during the presidency of Chen Shui-bian. The construction project was launched in 2007. Hampered by several controversies, the construction finally began in 2014. The industrial park was developed with a budget of NT$22.5 billion and construction of was completed on 14 March 2018. The industrial park was inaugurated on 15 October 2018 by President Tsai Ing-wen.

== Tenants ==
- Biomedical Translation Research Center, Academia Sinica
- Development Center for Biotechnology
- Food and Drug Administration
- National Laboratory Animal Center

== Transportation ==
The industrial park is accessible from Nangang Station of Taipei Metro.

== See also ==
- National Science and Technology Council (Taiwan)
