= Global Mall Banqiao Station =

Shopping mall in Banqiao, New Taipei, Taiwan

- 環球購物中心板橋車站

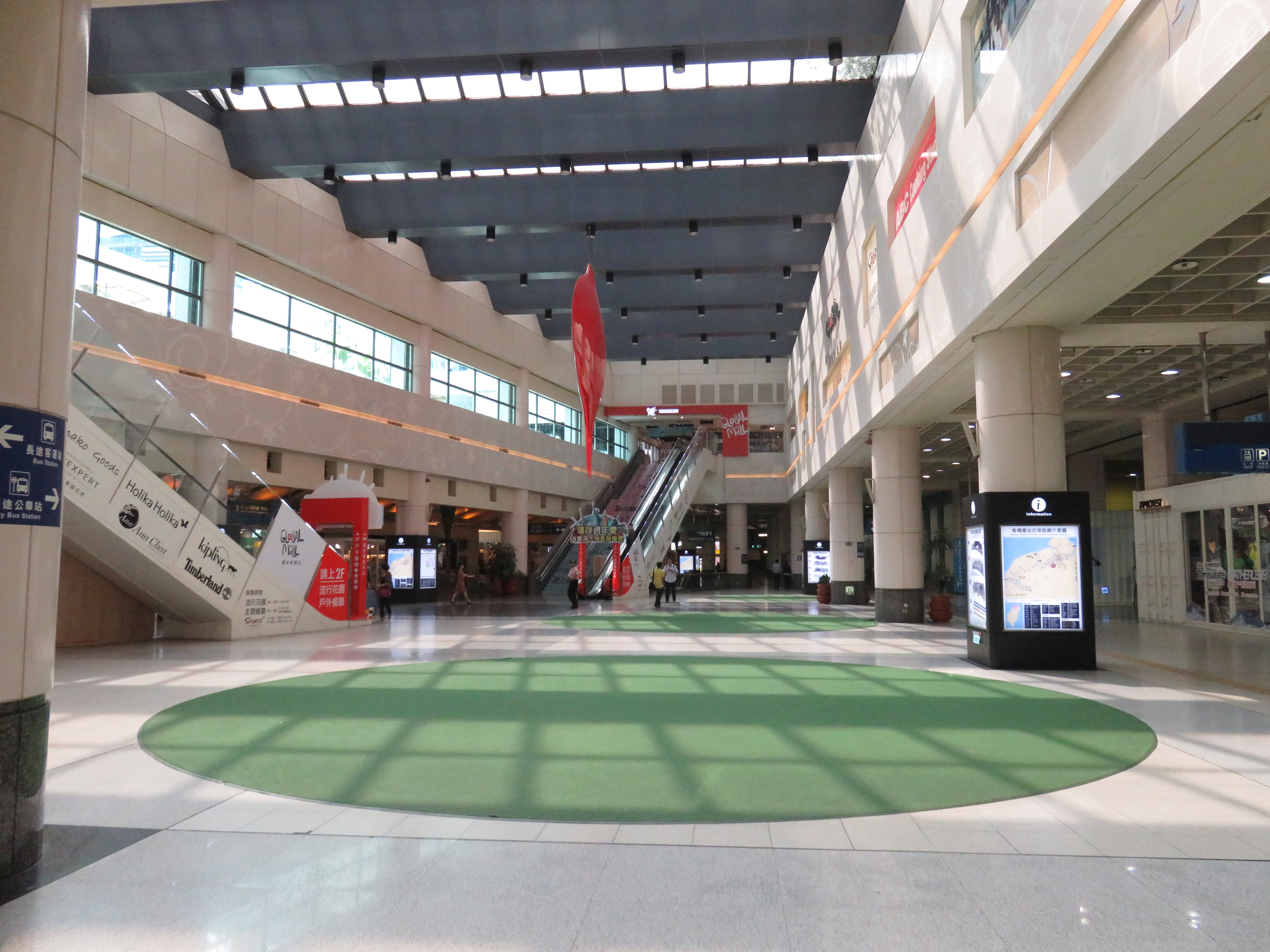
- Location: No. 7, Section 2, Xianmin Boulevard, Banqiao District, New Taipei, Taiwan
- Coordinates: 25.014631511036605°N 121.46377509755693°E
- Opened: April 2010
- Floor area: 24,730 m^{2} (266,200 sq ft)
- Floors: 2 floors above ground 1 floor below ground
- Public transit: Banqiao station
- Website: https://www.twglobalmall.com/

Global Mall Banqiao Station (Chinese: 環球購物中心板橋車站) is a shopping mall in Banqiao District, New Taipei, Taiwan that opened in April 2010. With a total floor area of 24,730 m^{2} (266,200 sq ft), the mall is located inside Banqiao station. It is the second store of Global Mall.

== Gallery ==
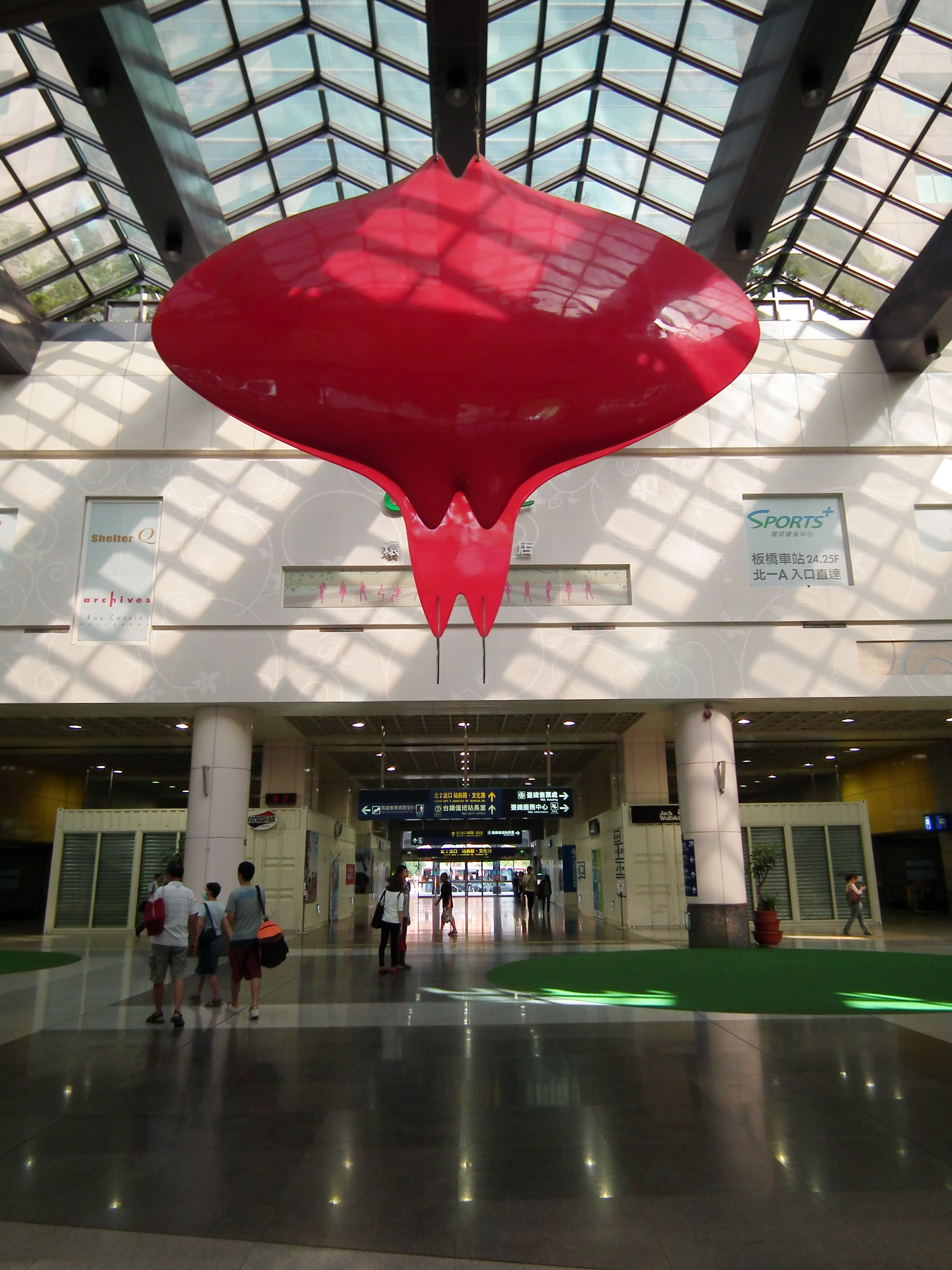
Interior

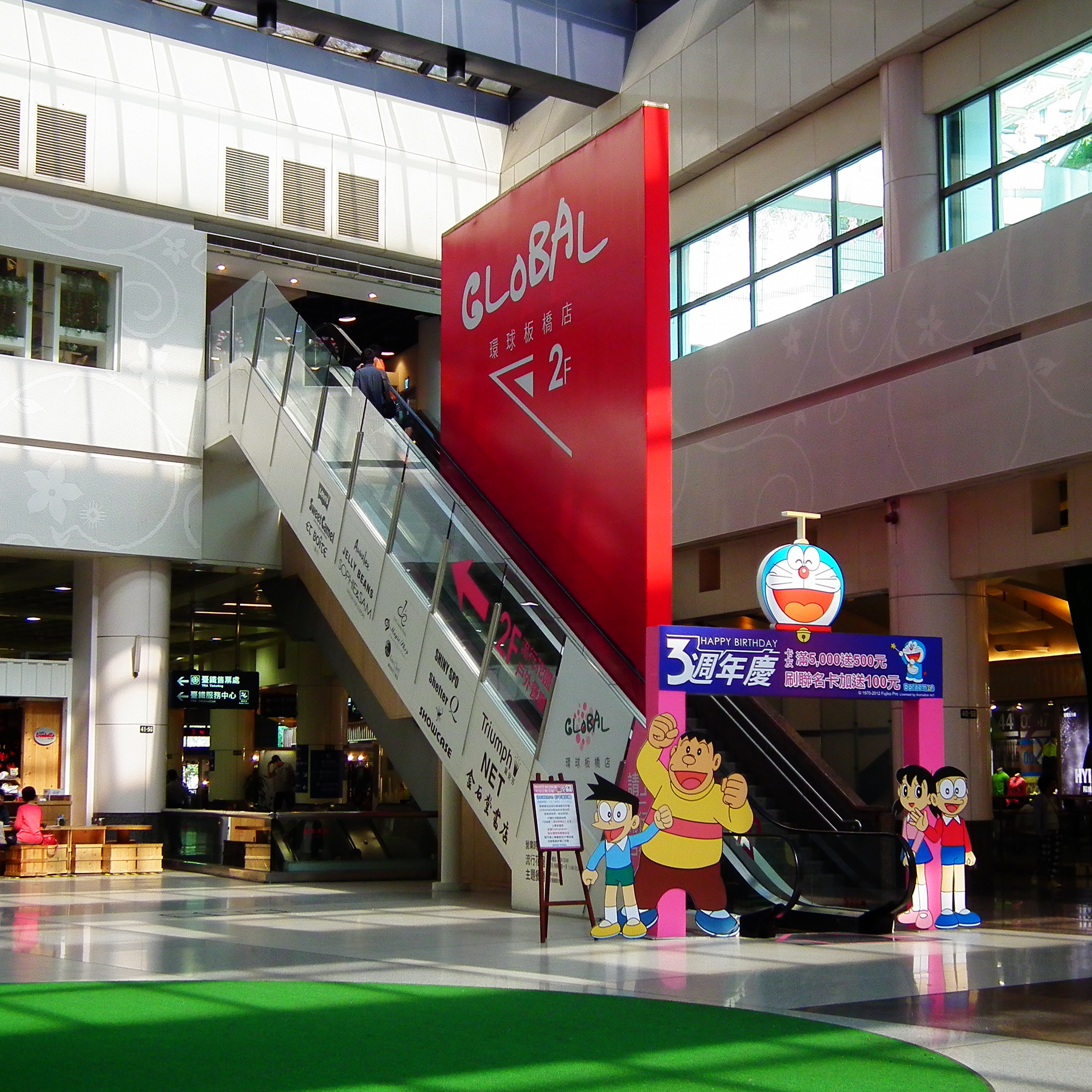
Interior

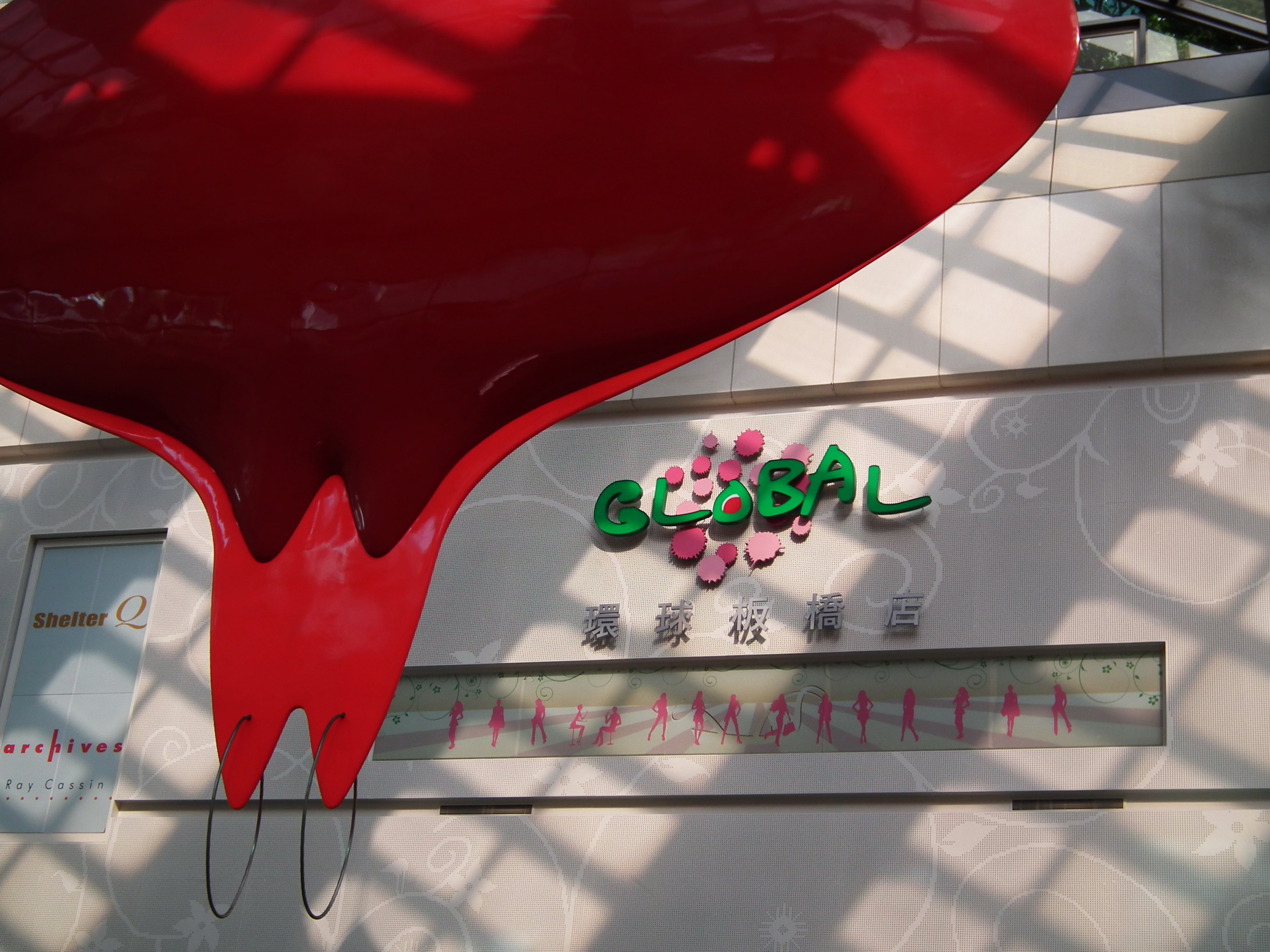

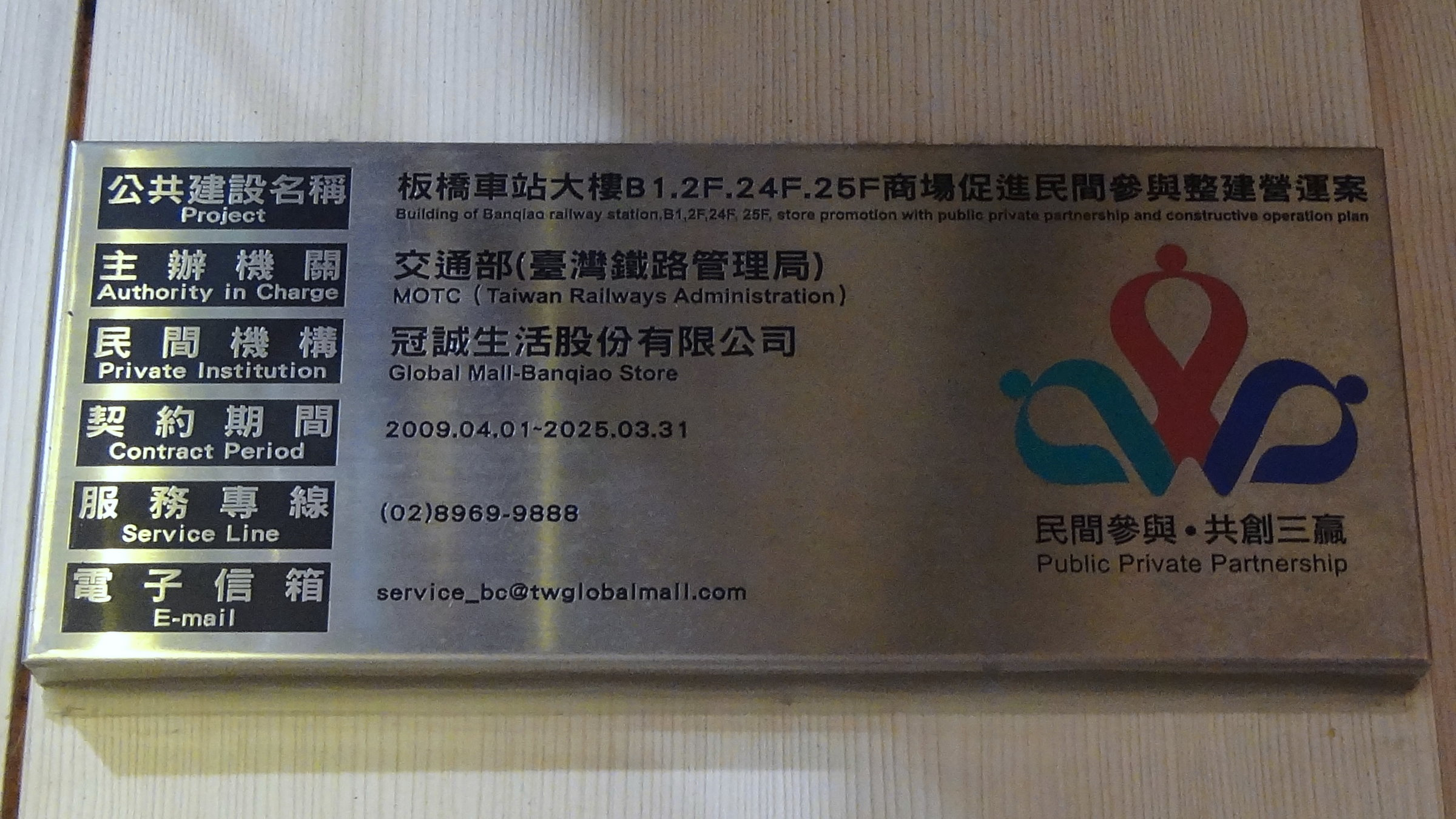
Project plate

== See also ==
- List of tourist attractions in Taiwan
- Global Mall Taoyuan A8
- Global Mall Xinzuoying Station
- Global Mall Pingtung
- Global Mall Zhonghe
