= Nangang District, Taipei =

District in Taipei, Taiwan

Coordinates: 25.053315°N 121.607409°E

Nangang 南港區 Nankang; NanKang; Nan-kang; Nan-chiang
- District
- Nangang District
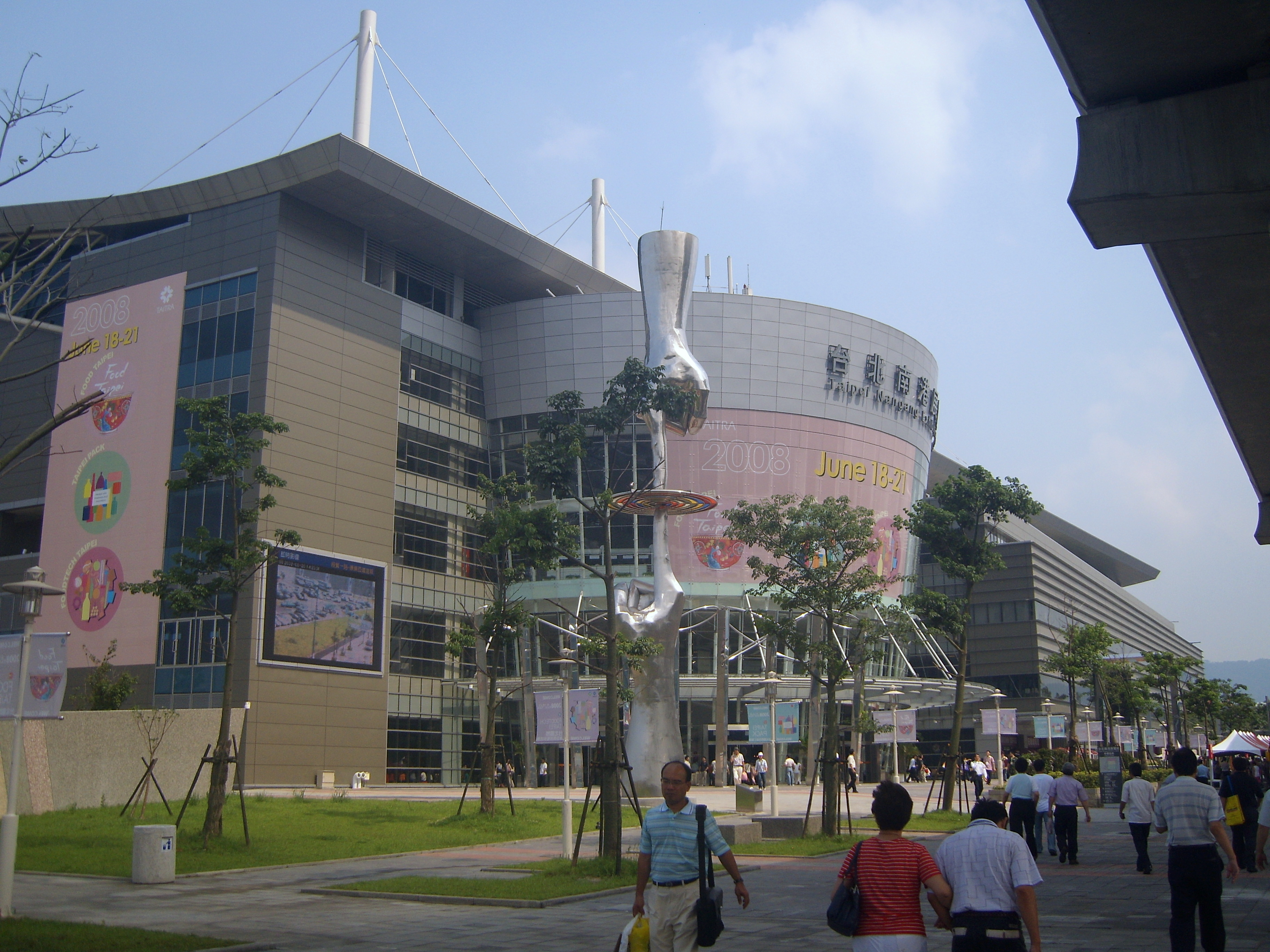
- Taipei WTC Nangang EXPO Hall

- Country: Republic of China (Taiwan)
- Region: Eastern Taipei
- Divisions: List: 20 villages; 443 neighborhoods

Area
  - Total: 21.8424 km^{2} (8.4334 sq mi)
  - Rank: Ranked 5th of 12

Population (January 2023)
  - Total: 113,920
  - Rank: Ranked 12th of 12
  - Density: 5,215.5/km^{2} (13,508/sq mi)
- Postal code: 115
- Website: ngdo.gov.taipei (in Chinese)

Nangang District
- Traditional Chinese: 南港區
Transcriptions
Standard Mandarin
- Hanyu Pinyin: Nángǎng Qū
- Wade–Giles: Nan-kang Chü
- Tongyong Pinyin: Nangang Cyu
Southern Min
- Hokkien POJ: Lâm-káng-khu

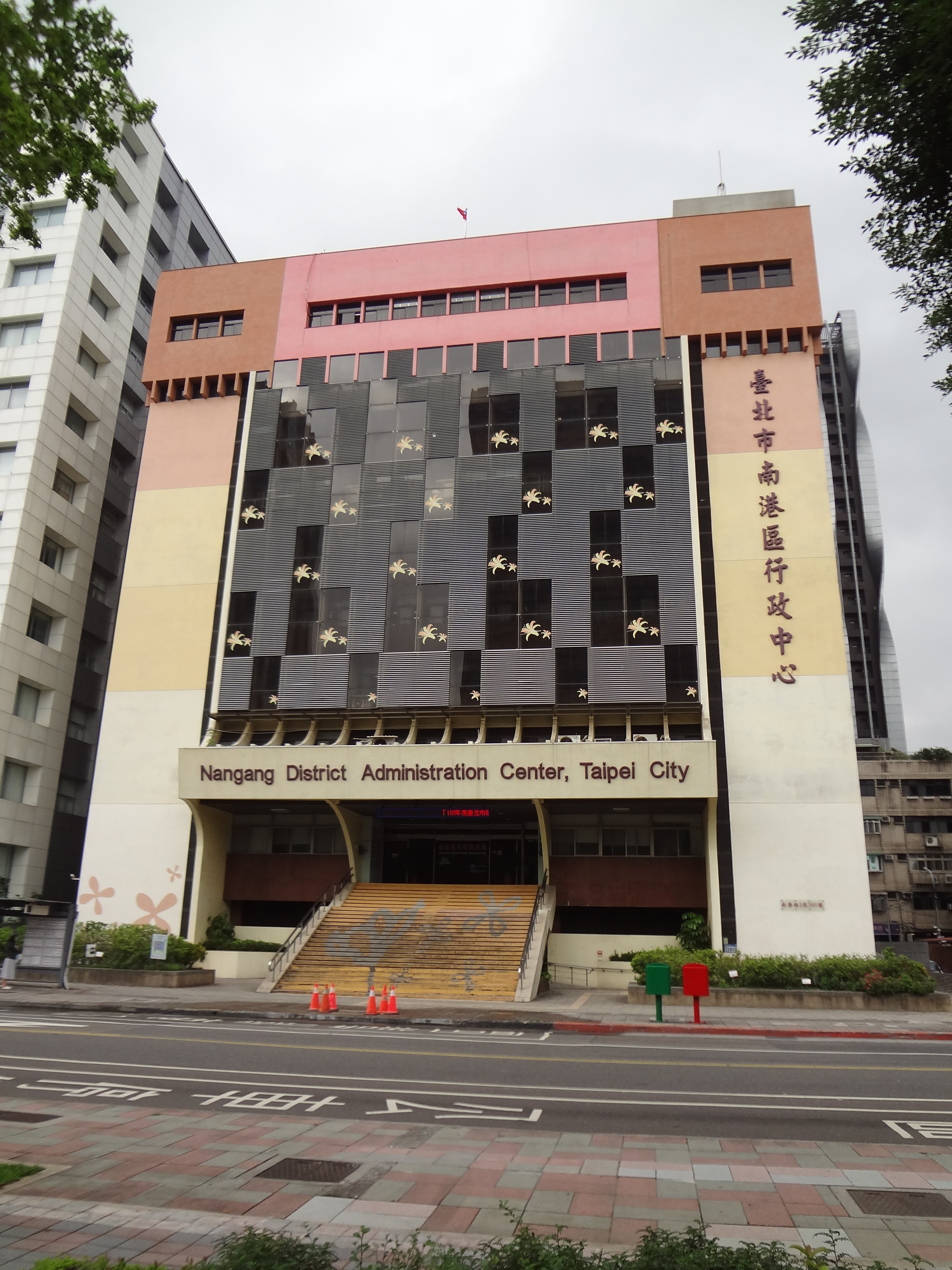
Nangang District Administration Center

Nangang District (Chinese: 南港區) (Pinyin: Nángǎng Qū), also Nankang, is a southeastern district of Taipei, Taiwan. It is the seat of the Academia Sinica, Taipei World Trade Center Nangang Exhibition Hall, Nankang Software Park (NKSP), and Mitsui Shopping Park LaLaport Taipei Nangang.

== History ==
Nangang was settled in 1735 by Fujianese, especially in the present villages of Nangang, Sanchong, and Dongxin. The placename was Toakalah (Chinese: 大佳臘; Pe̍h-ōe-jī: Tōa-ka-la̍h), Nangang-Sanchong Port (南港三重埔; Lâm-káng Saⁿ-têng-po͘). The Qing era name of Lamkang'a (南港仔; Lâm-káng-á; 'southern port'), refers to its position on Keelung River.

In 1920, during the Japanese era, Nangang was part of Naiko Village (内湖庄), Shichisei District (七星區), Taihoku Prefecture. In December 1945, after the handover of Taiwan to the Kuomintang, the administrative levels were changed to Neihu Township (內湖鄉), Qixing District (七星區), Taipei County. On July 6 of the following year, as proposed by Mayor Que Shankeng (闕山坑), Nangang was separated into its own township (南港鎮). In 1968, it became a district of Taipei.

== Administration ==
Nangang is administered as 20 urban villages.

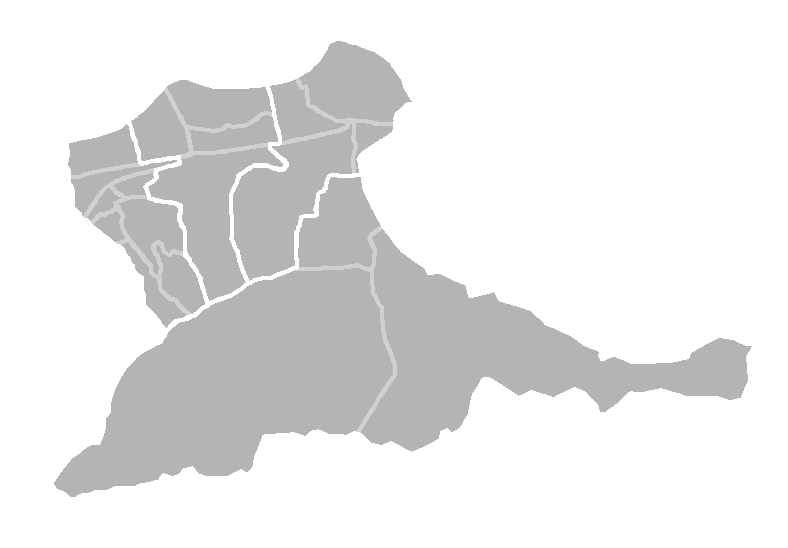
Urban villages of Nangang District

== Government institutions ==
- Food and Drug Administration
- Institute of Economics, Academia Sinica

== Education ==
- Academia Sinica
- China University of Science and Technology

== Economy ==
- National Biotechnology Research Park

== Miscellaneous ==
- Xintian Temple (信天宮; 'Faith in Heaven') here is dedicated to the goddess Matsu.
- Hu Shih died here.

== Tourist attractions ==
- Lingnan Fine Arts Museum
- Taipei Nangang Exhibition Center
- Nanhu Riverside Park
- Nanxing Park
- Nangang Park
- Shanshuilu Eco Park
- Taipei Nangang Sports Center
- Mitsui Shopping Park LaLaport Taipei Nangang

== Transportation ==
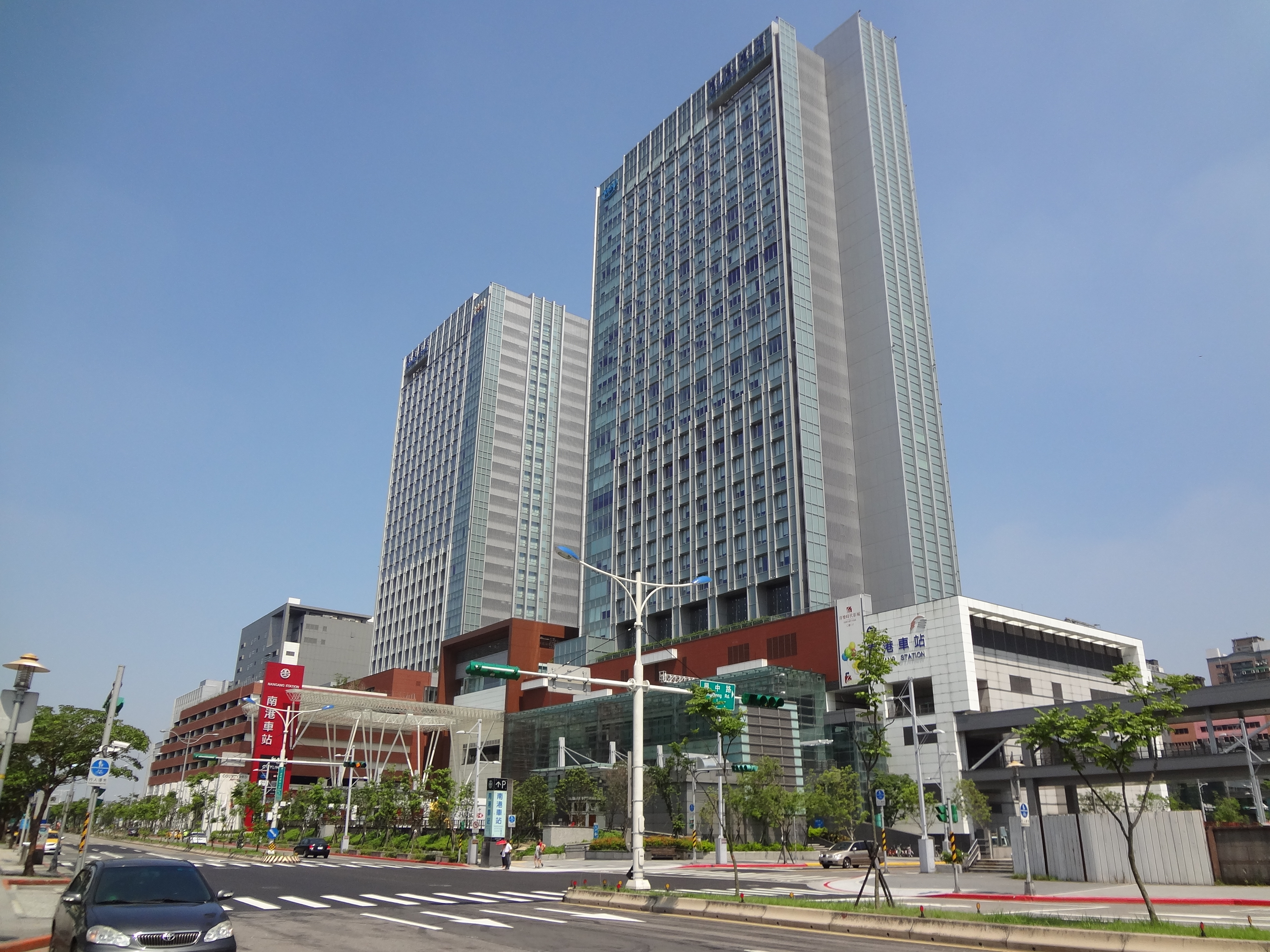
Nangang Station

=== Metro ===
- Nangang Software Park metro station
- Houshanpi metro station
- Kunyang metro station
- Nangang station
- Taipei Nangang Exhibition Center metro station

=== Highways and Roads ===
- Freeway 3
- Freeway 5
- Provincial Highway 5
- Huandong Boulevard
- City Route 109

== Notable people ==
- Roy Chiu, actor, singer and racing driver

== See also ==
- Taipei
