= New Taipei City Main Public Library =

Public library in Banqiao, New Taipei, Taiwan

- 新北市立圖書館
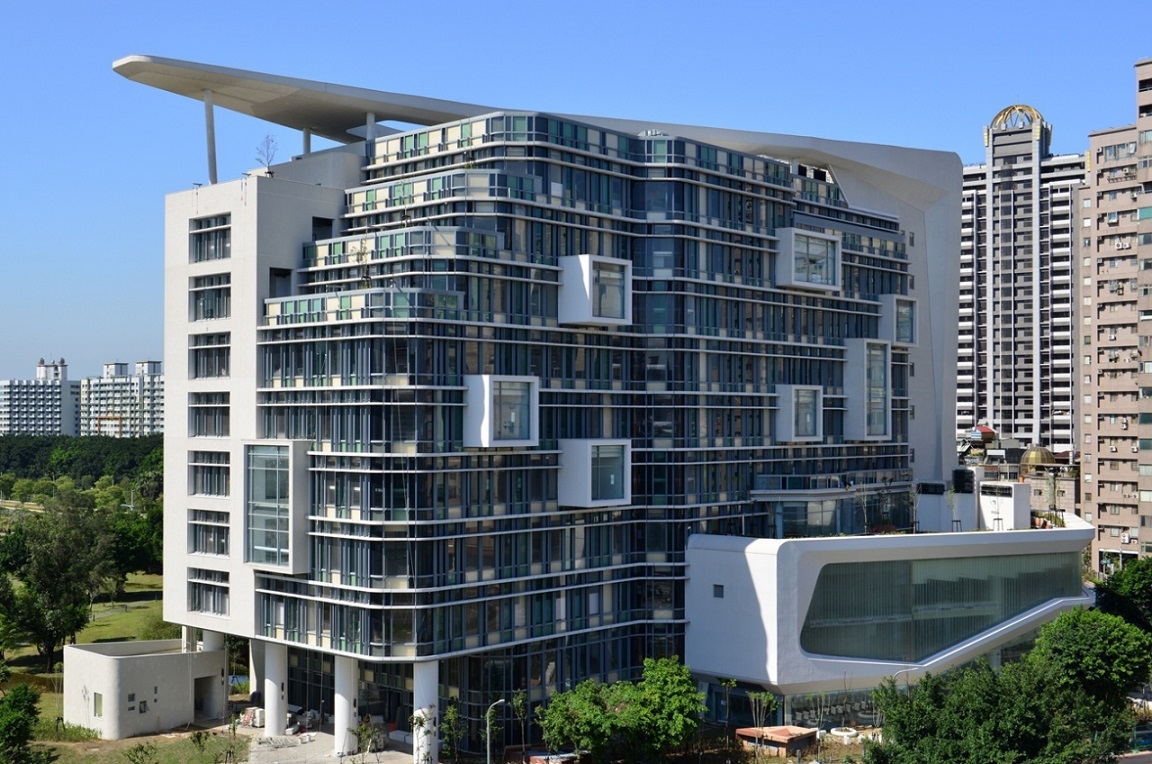
- 25°00′05″N 121°27′18.5″E
- Location: 139, Guixing Rd. Banqiao; New Taipei, Taiwan 22060
- Established: 1948; 2015 (current main library)
- Branches: 104

Other information
- Director: Jin-Hua Wang
- Employees: 626
- Website: www.library.ntpc.gov.tw

The New Taipei City Main Public Library (Chinese: 新北市立圖書館; pinyin: Xīnběi Shìlì Túshūguǎn) is the central library of New Taipei City, Taiwan. It is the main library of the New Taipei City Public Library System and opened in May 2015. The building is located in Guixing Rd, Banqiao District, near the Taipei Metro Far Eastern Hospital Station. It is the first library in Taiwan to offer 24-hour service.

== Architecture ==
=== Old building ===
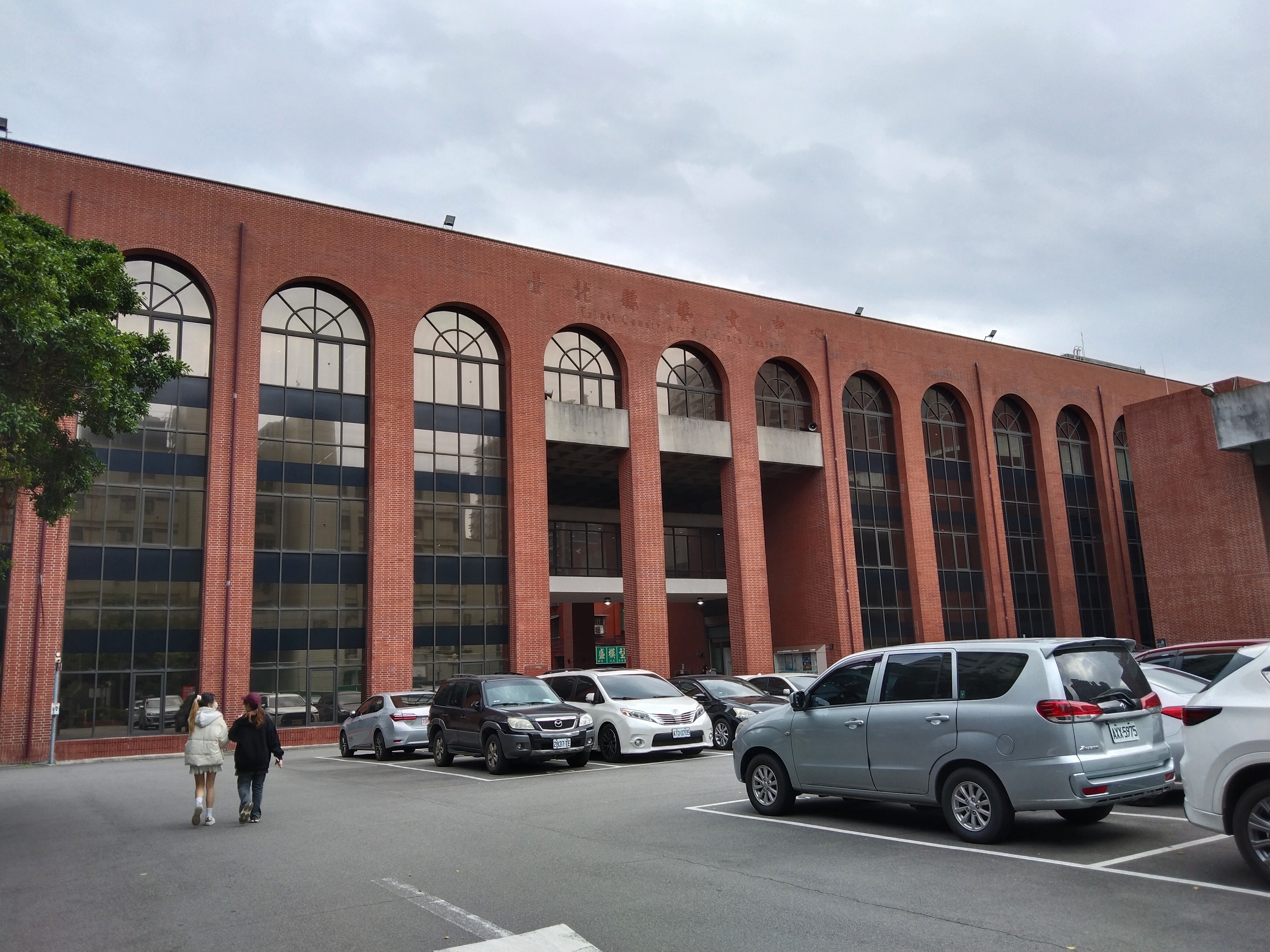
Former building of New Taipei Main Public Library, now Jiangzicui Branch

The former building of New Taipei Main Public Library was opened in 1983, comprises 3 above-ground floors. It was changed to "New Taipei City Library Banqiao Jiangzicui Branch" after the opening of the new main library.

=== New building ===
New Taipei City Main Public Library comprises 10 above-ground floors and three below.

Floors	Use
10	Administration office
9	Reference, Western Publications and Multicultural Collection, Local Collection, Conference Room
8	000-399 Stacks, Government Publications, Simplified Chinese Collection, Reading Corner (American style, Japanese Zen style)
7	400-799 Stacks, Discussion Room, Reading Corner (Mediterranean style)
6	800-999 Stacks, Reading Corner (British style, South French Cottage style, Bali style)
5	Multimedia Area, Information Commons, Group Multimedia Area, Multimedia Classroom, Classroom, Audiovisual Room, Multifunction Room, Reading Corner (Northern European style)
4	Study Room, Comics & Manga, New Taipei City District Resource Center, Sun Room
3	Young Reader’s Area, Young Reader’s Storytelling Zone, Auditorium, Family Reading Area, Breastfeeding Room
2	Periodicals & Newspapers, Bound Periodicals, Senior Citizens’ Resources
1	Circulation Service, 24 Hours Self-Checkout, 24 Hours Self-Return, New Arrival Books Area, New Taipei City Gallery, Braille Materials Room, Multifunctional Area, Coffee Shop
B1-B3	Parking Garage

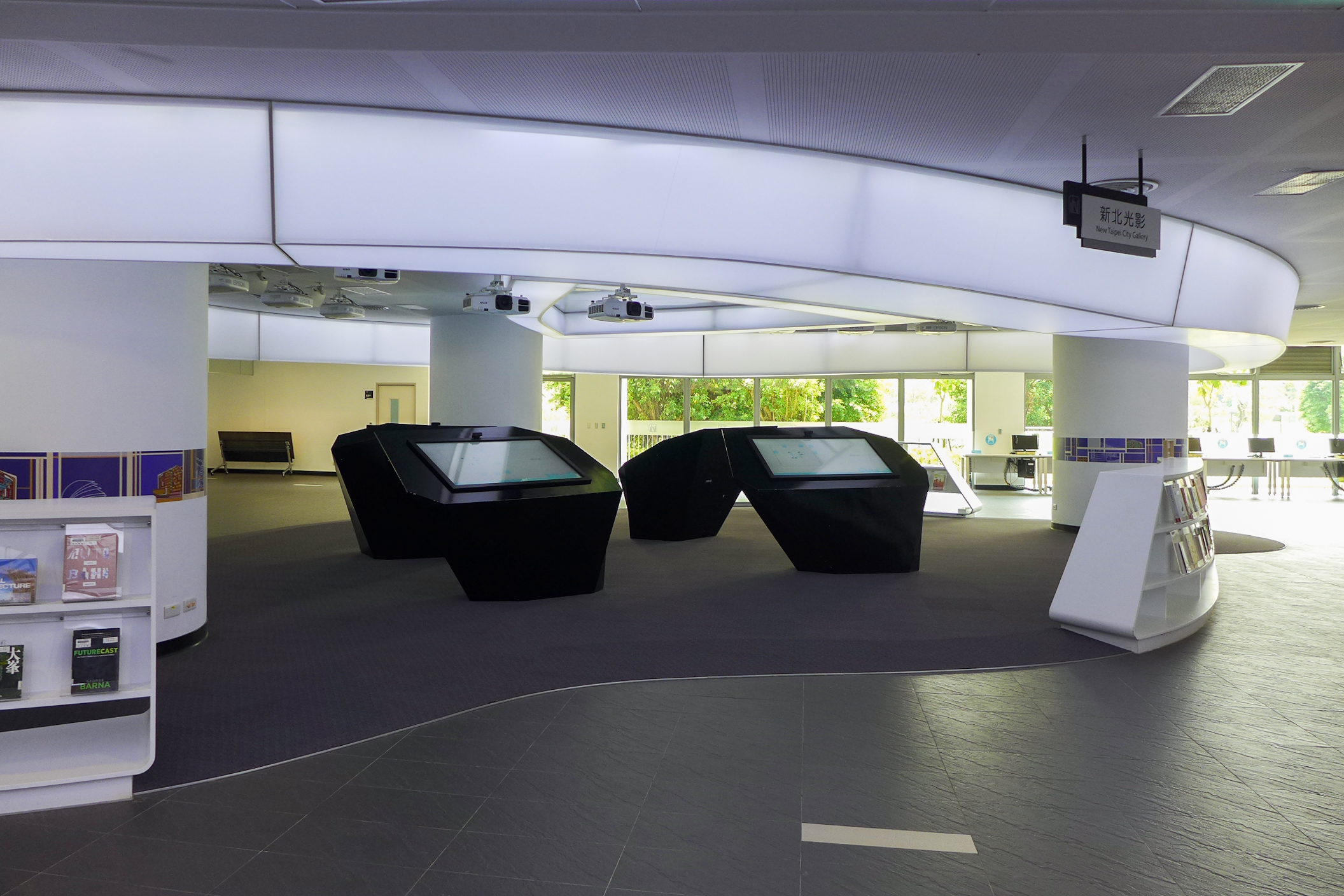
"New Taipei City Gallery"

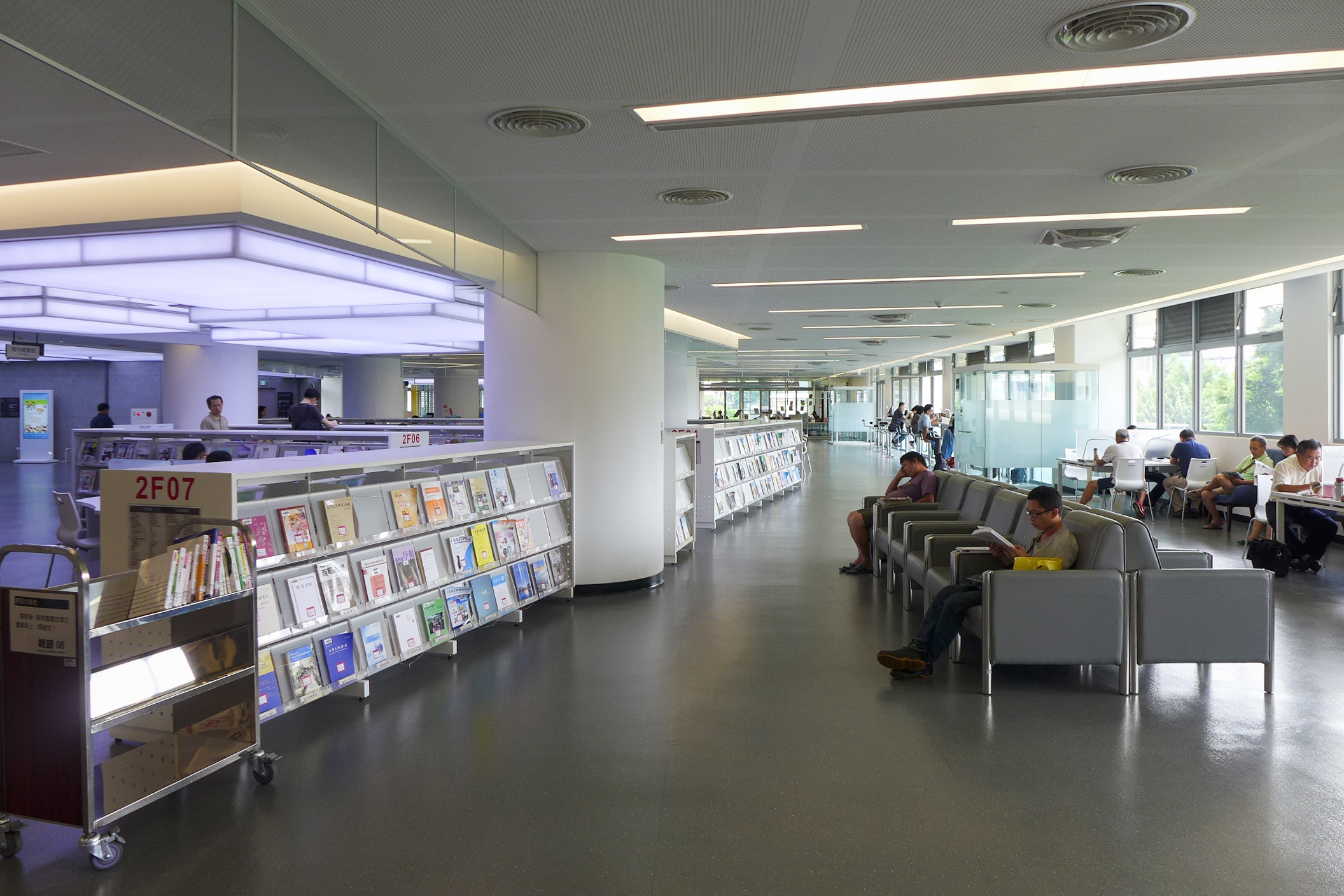
Periodicals & Newspapers Area

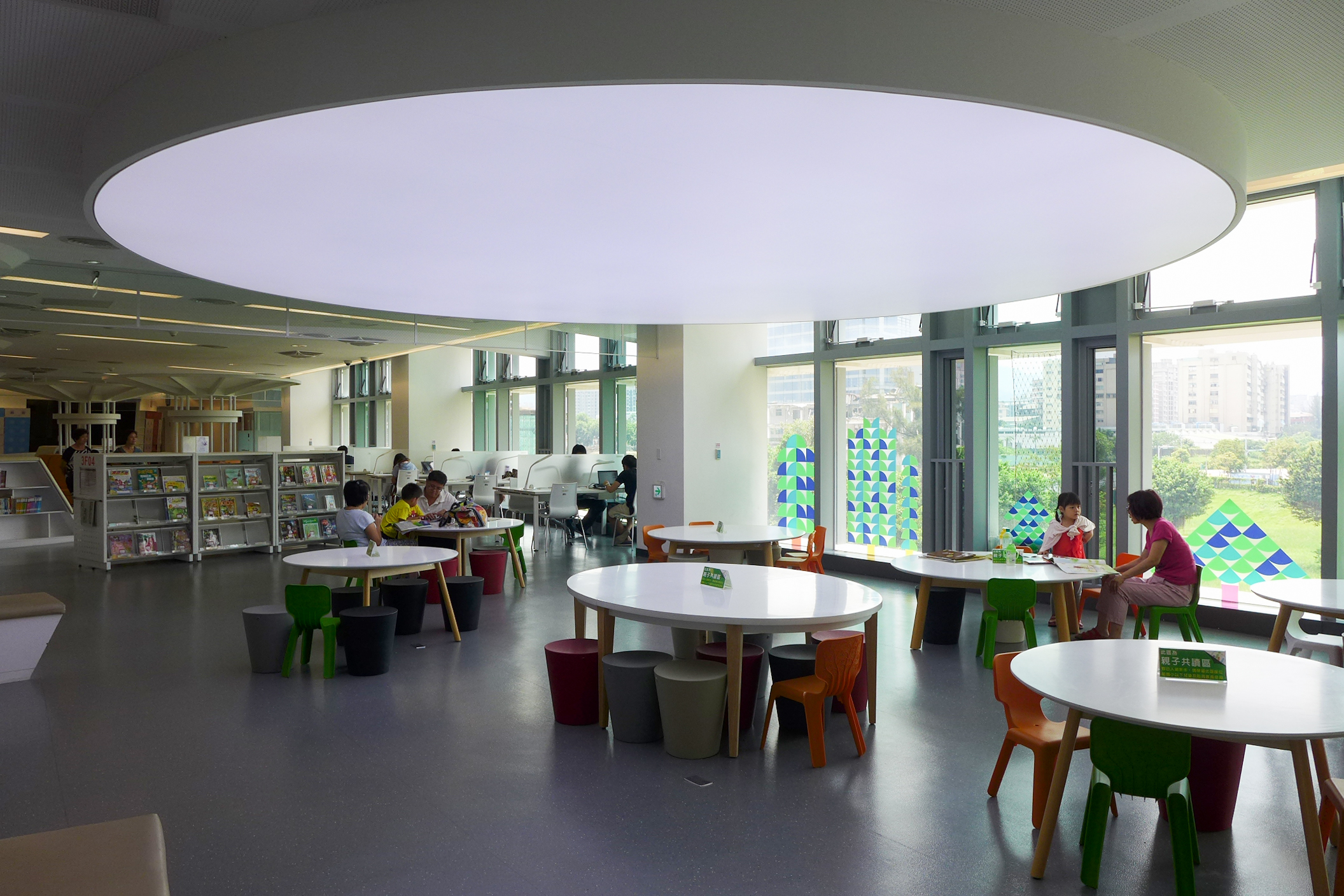
Young Reader’s Area

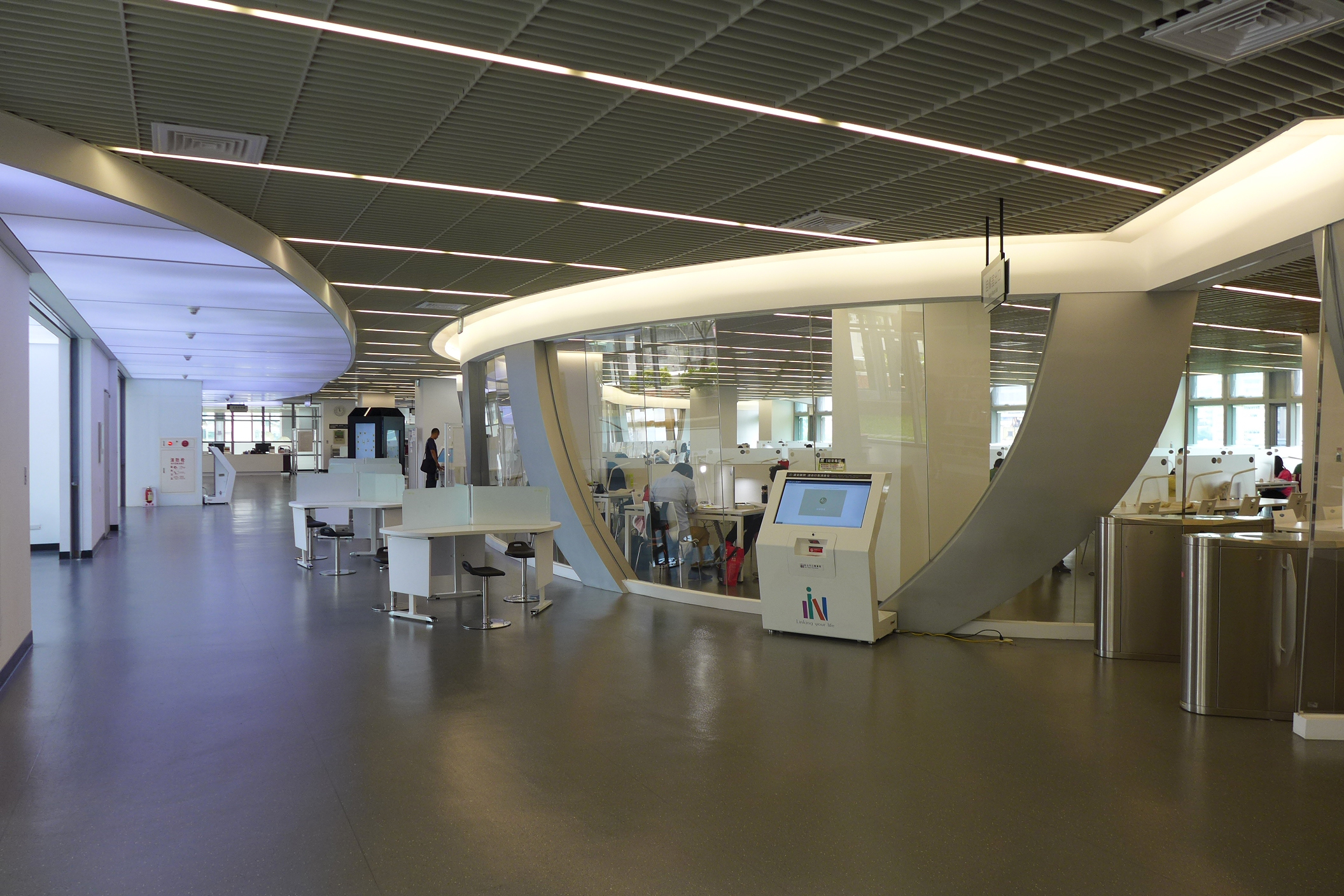
Study Room

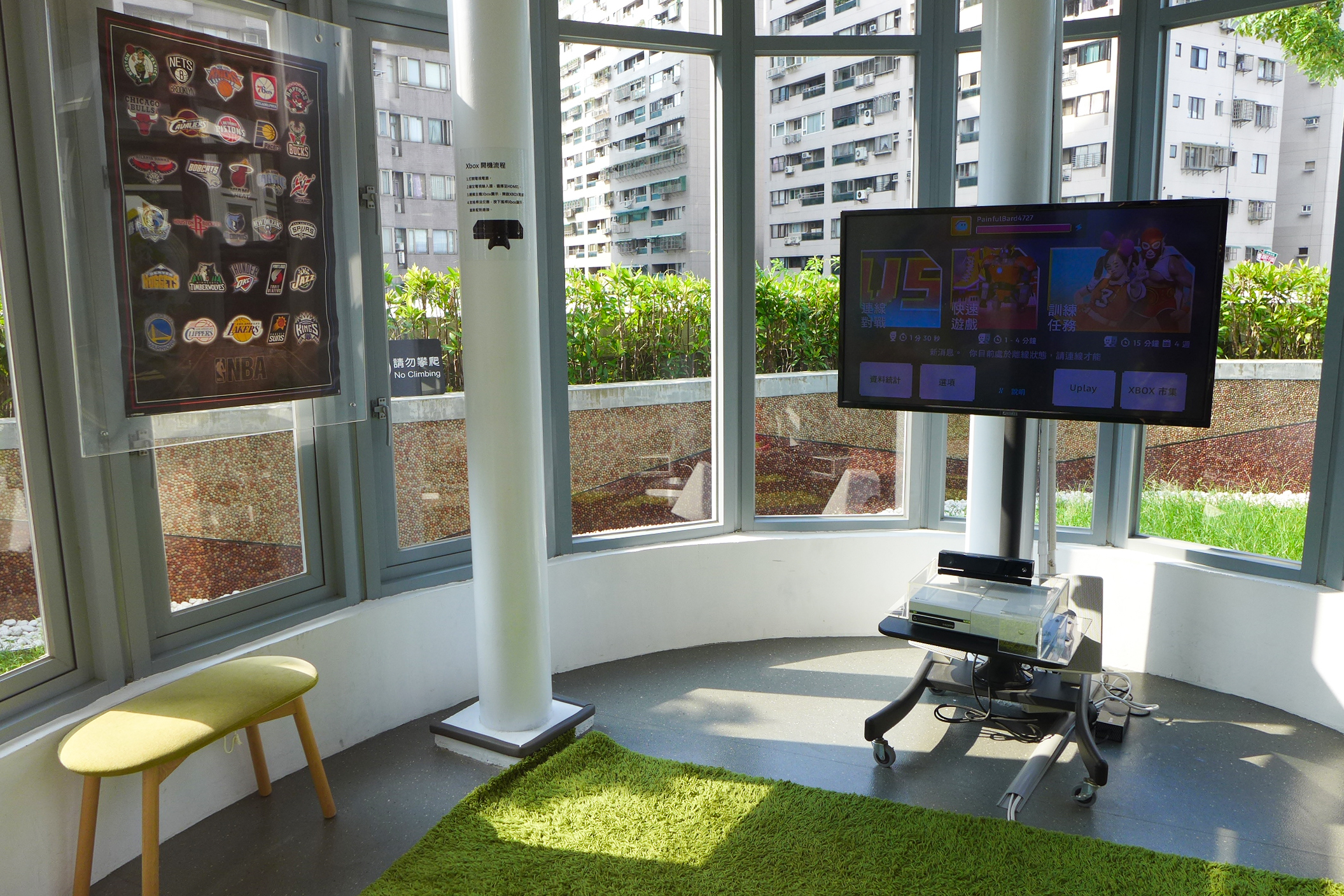
"Sun Room"

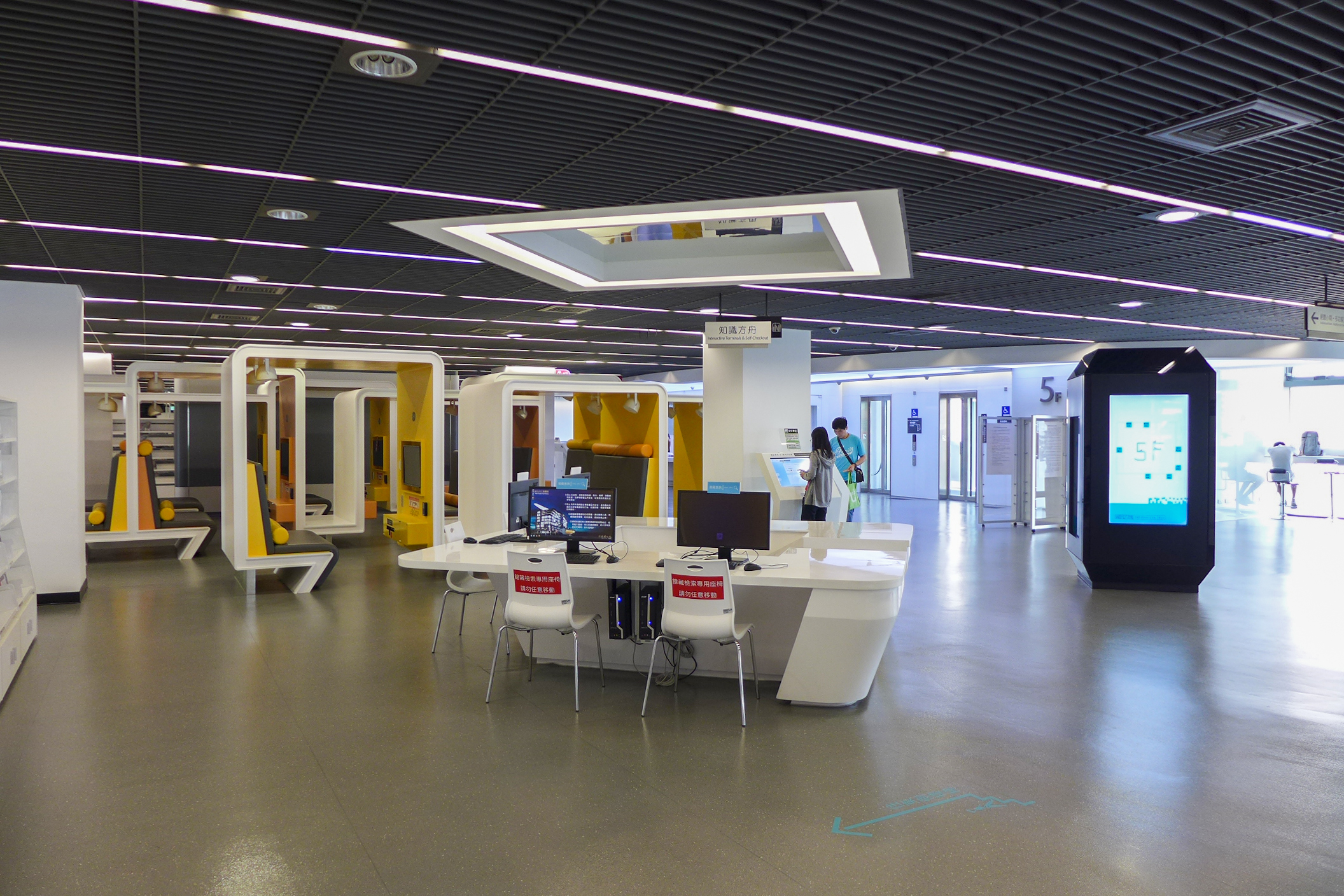
Multimedia Area

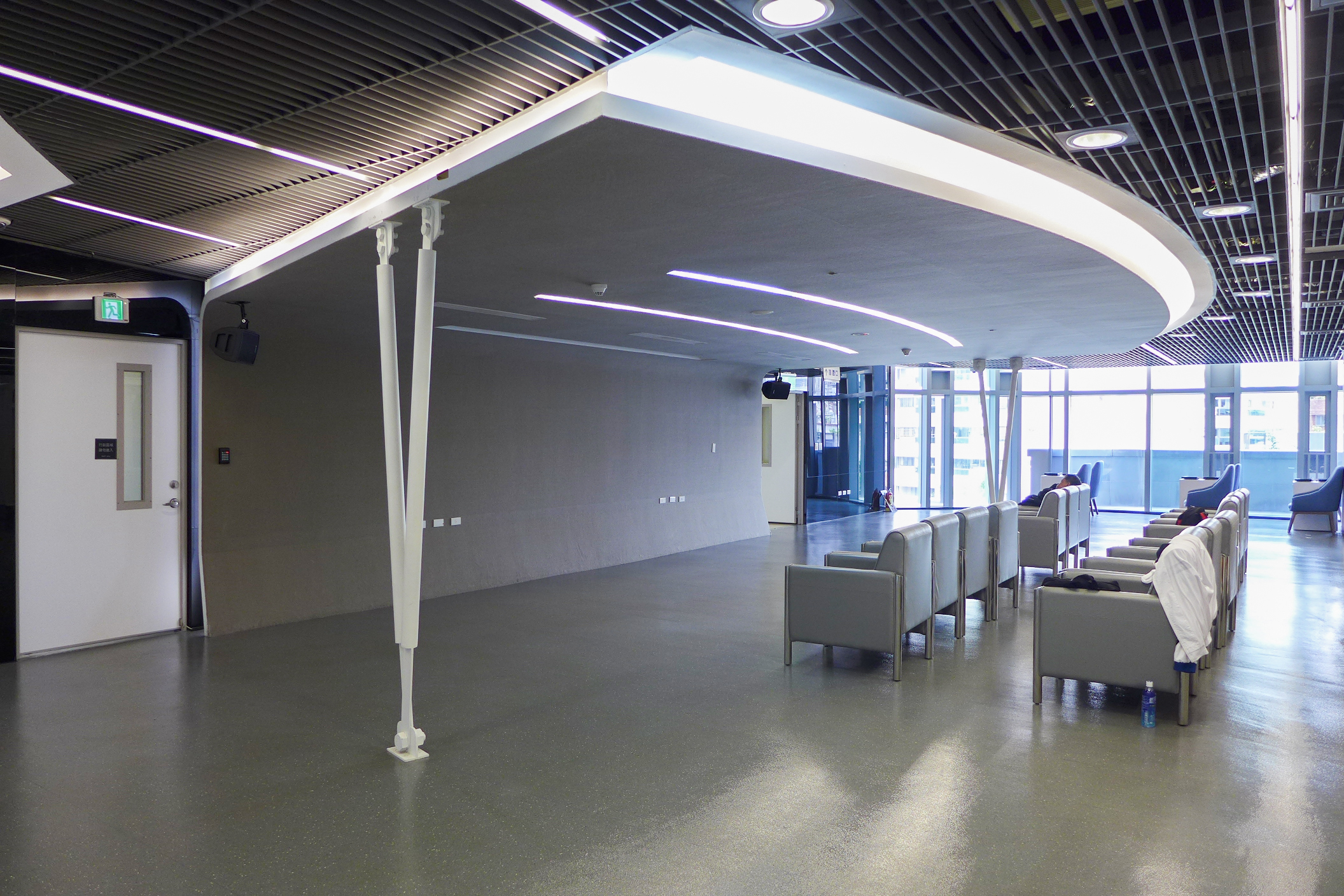
Group Multimedia Area

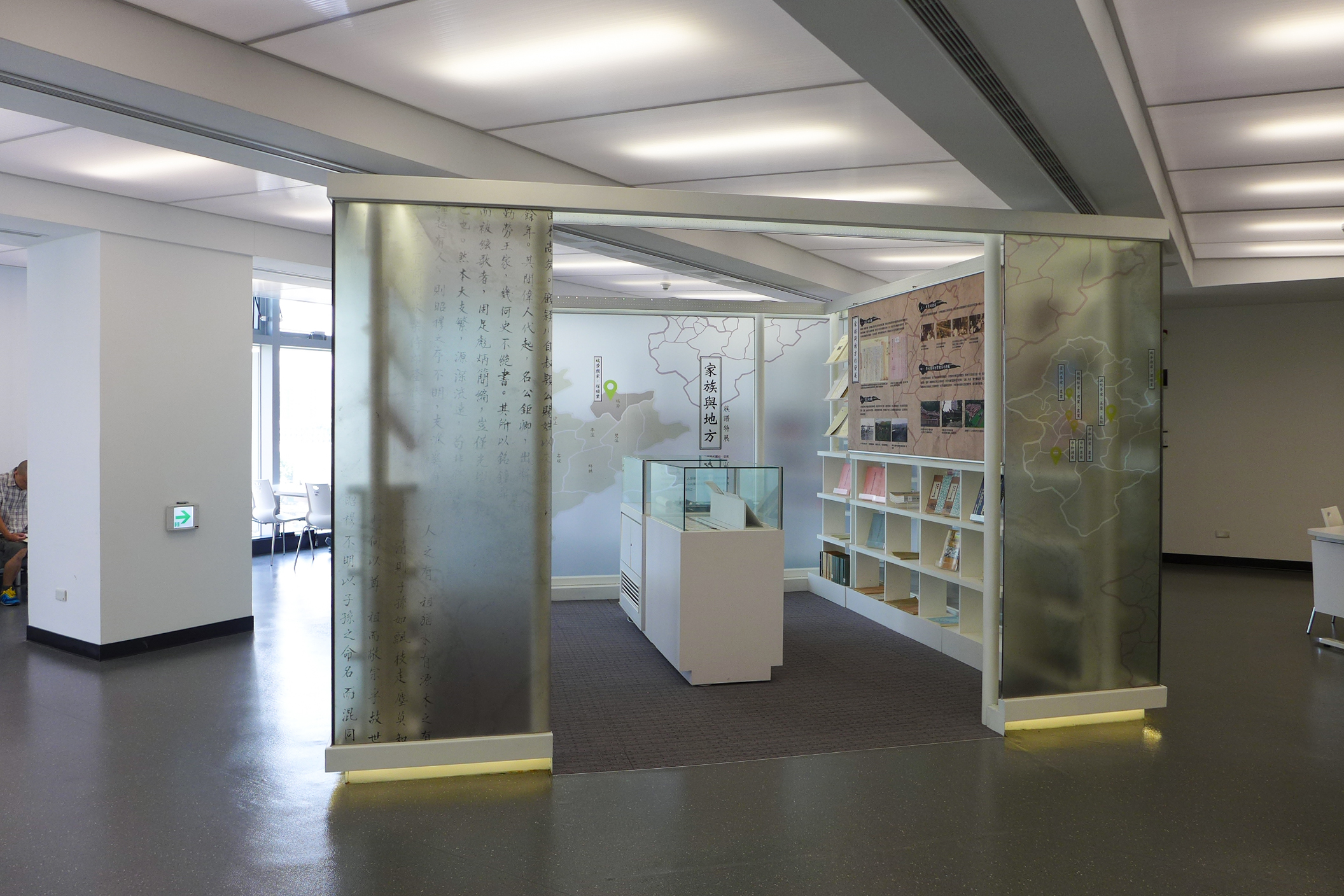
7th floor

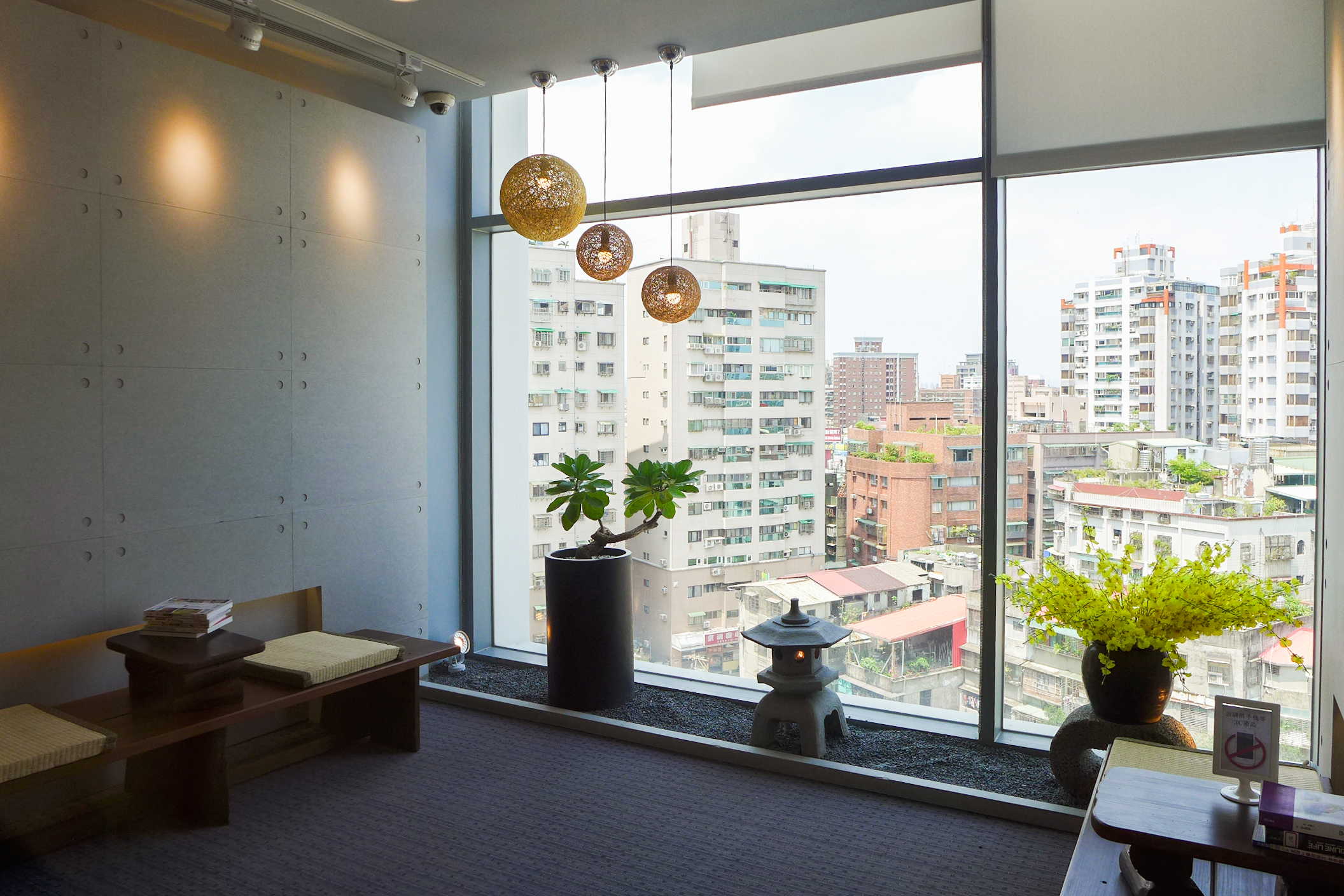
"Reading Corner" (Japanese Zen style)

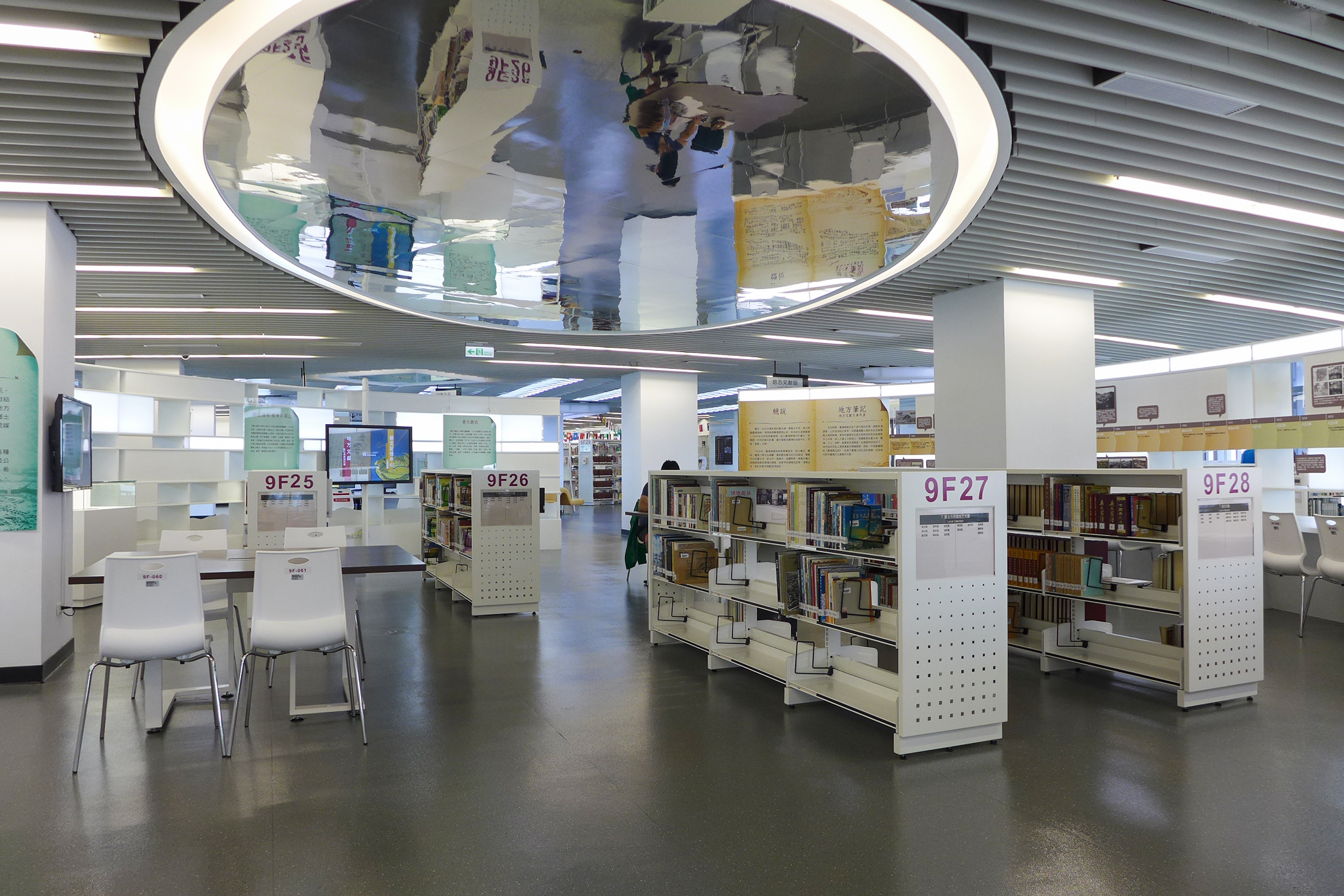
Reference Area
