= List of Taipei Metro stations =

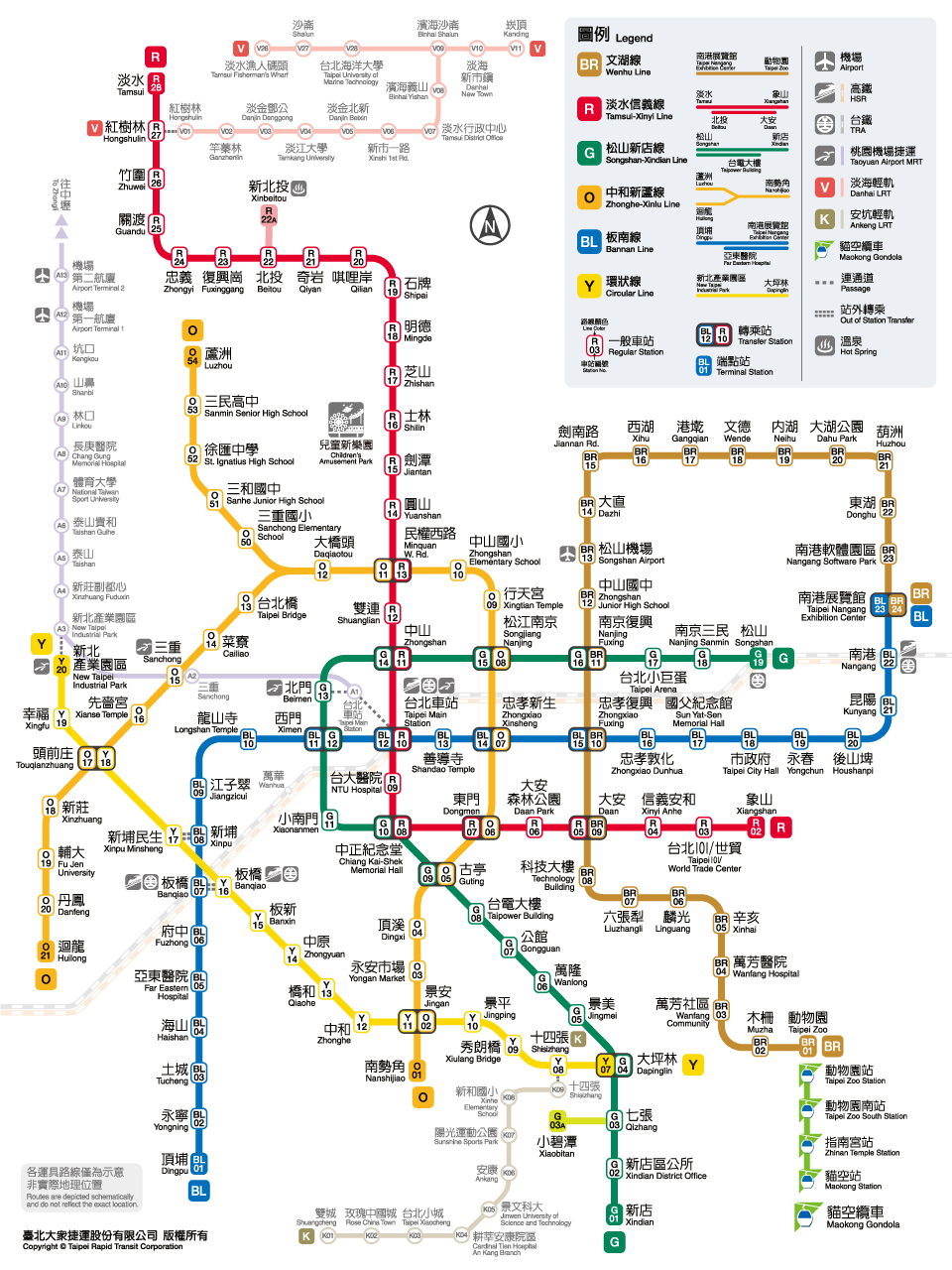
Taipei MRT official map (2023)

There are currently 131 stations on the Taipei Metro network (MRT) operated by the Taipei Rapid Transit Corporation. The first section to open was the Wenhu Line (formerly the Muzha Line), which began operation on March 28, 1996, between Taipei Zoo station and Zhongshan Junior High School station.

As of 2025, the network extends approximately 152.3 km (94.6 mi) and consists of six main routes; these lines converge at major transfer hubs, with Taipei Main Station serving as the primary crossing for the Tamsui–Xinyi and Bannan lines, as well as connections to the Taoyuan Airport MRT, High-Speed Rail, and TRA.

== Stations ==
=== Wenhu line ===
Code	Station name		Travel time to previous station (s)	Stop time at station (s)	Date opened	Transfer	Districts
Code	English	Chinese	Travel time to previous station (s)	Stop time at station (s)	Date opened	Transfer	Districts
BR01	Taipei Zoo	動物園	—N/a	25	1996-03-28	(under construction)	Wenshan
BR02	Muzha	木柵	67	25	1996-03-28		Wenshan
BR03	Wanfang Community	萬芳社區	47	25	1996-03-28		Wenshan
BR04	Wanfang Hospital	萬芳醫院	99	25	1996-03-28		Wenshan
BR05	Xinhai	辛亥	106	25	1996-03-28		Wenshan
BR06	Linguang	麟光	124	40	1996-03-28		Xinyi, Daan
BR07	Liuzhangli	六張犁	72	40	1996-03-28		Xinyi, Daan
BR08	Technology Building	科技大樓	122	40	1996-03-28		Daan
BR09	Daan	大安	69	40	1996-03-28	Tamsui–Xinyi Line	Daan
BR10	Zhongxiao Fuxing	忠孝復興	67	40	1996-03-28	Bannan Line	Daan
BR11	Nanjing Fuxing	南京復興	86	30	1996-03-28	Songshan–Xindian Line	Songshan
BR12	Zhongshan Junior High School	中山國中	66	45	1996-03-28		Zhongshan, Songshan
BR13	Songshan Airport	松山機場	142	25	2009-07-04	TSA	Songshan
BR14	Dazhi	大直	172	25	2009-07-04		Zhongshan
BR15	Jiannan Road	劍南路	103	25	2009-07-04	(under construction)	Zhongshan
BR16	Xihu	西湖	110	25	2009-07-04		Neihu
BR17	Gangqian	港墘	65	25	2009-07-04		Neihu
BR18	Wende	文德	72	25	2009-07-04		Neihu
BR19	Neihu	內湖	78	25	2009-07-04		Neihu
BR20	Dahu Park	大湖公園	71	25	2009-07-04		Neihu
BR21	Huzhou	葫洲	121	25	2009-07-04		Neihu
BR22	Donghu	東湖	78	25	2009-07-04		Neihu
BR23	Nangang Software Park	南港軟體園區	85	25	2009-07-04		Nangang
BR24	Taipei Nangang Exhibition Center	南港展覽館	78	—N/a	2009-07-04	Bannan Line	Nangang

=== Tamsui-Xinyi line ===
Code	Station name		Travel time to previous station (s)	Stop time at station (s)	Date opened	Transfers	Districts	City			
Code	English	Chinese	Travel time to previous station (s)	Stop time at station (s)	Date opened	Transfers	Districts	City			
R01	Guangci/Fengtian Temple	廣慈/奉天宮	135	R02	Xiangshan	象山	71	—N/a	2013-11-24	Xinyi	Taipei
R03	Taipei 101/World Trade Center	台北101/世貿	93	30					2013-11-24	Xinyi	Taipei
R04	Xinyi Anhe	信義安和	81	30	Daan				2013-11-24		Taipei
R05	Daan	大安	81	30	Daan	Wenhu Line			2013-11-24		Taipei
R06	Daan Park	大安森林公園	70	30	Daan				2013-11-24		Taipei
R07	Dongmen	東門	65	35	Zhonghe–Xinlu Line	Zhongzheng, Daan			2013-11-24		Taipei
R08	Chiang Kai-shek Memorial Hall	中正紀念堂	165	35	1998-12-24	(under construction)	Zhongzheng				Taipei
R09	NTU Hospital	台大醫院	83	25	1998-12-24		Zhongzheng				Taipei
R10	Taipei Main Station	台北車站	63	45	1997-12-25	Taiwan Railway Taiwan High Speed Rail	Zhongzheng				Taipei
R11	Zhongshan	中山	65	30	1997-03-28	Songshan–Xindian Line	Datong, Zhongshan				Taipei
R12	Shuanglian	雙連	58	25	1997-03-28		Datong, Zhongshan				Taipei
R13	Minquan West Road	民權西路	57	35	1997-03-28	Zhonghe–Xinlu Line	Datong, Zhongshan				Taipei
R14	Yuanshan	圓山	90	25	1997-03-28		Datong, Zhongshan				Taipei
R15	Jiantan	劍潭	109	25	1997-03-28		Shilin				Taipei
R16	Shilin	士林	92	25	1997-03-28	(under construction)	Shilin				Taipei
R17	Zhishan	芝山	91	25	1997-03-28		Shilin				Taipei
R18	Mingde	明德	76	25	1997-03-28		Beitou				Taipei
R19	Shipai	石牌	61	25	1997-03-28		Beitou				Taipei
R20	Qilian	唭哩岸	100	25	1997-03-28		Beitou				Taipei
R21	Qiyan	奇岩	73	25	1997-03-28		Beitou				Taipei
R22	Beitou	北投	91	25	1997-03-28	Xinbeitou branch Line	Beitou				Taipei
R22A	Xinbeitou	新北投	157	—N/a	1997-03-28		Beitou				Taipei
R23	Fuxinggang	復興崗	145 (Note: to Beitou)	25	1997-03-28		Beitou				Taipei
R24	Zhongyi	忠義	109	25	1997-03-28		Beitou				Taipei
R25	Guandu	關渡	78	25	1997-03-28		Beitou				Taipei
R26	Zhuwei	竹圍	145	25	1997-03-28		Tamsui	New Taipei			
R27	Hongshulin	紅樹林	136	25	1997-03-28	Danhai LRT	Tamsui	New Taipei			
R28	Tamsui	淡水	175	—N/a	1997-03-28		Tamsui	New Taipei			

=== Xinbeitou branch line ===
Code	Station name		Transfer	District
Code	English	Chinese	Transfer	District
R22A	Xinbeitou	新北投		Beitou, Taipei
R22	Beitou	北投	Tamsui–Xinyi Line	Beitou, Taipei

=== Songshan-Xindian line ===
Code	Station name		Travel time to previous station (s)	Stop time at station (s)	Date opened	Transfers	Districts	City
Code	English	Chinese	Travel time to previous station (s)	Stop time at station (s)	Date opened	Transfers	Districts	City
G01	Xindian	新店	—N/a	25	1999-11-11		Xindian	New Taipei
G02	Xindian District Office	新店區公所	111	25	1999-11-11		Xindian	New Taipei
G03	Qizhang	七張	78	25	1999-11-11	Xiaobitan branch Line	Xindian	New Taipei
G03A	Xiaobitan	小碧潭	203	—N/a	2004-09-29		Xindian	New Taipei
G04	Dapinglin	大坪林	75 (Note: to Qizhang)	25	1999-11-11	Circular Line (Taipei metropolitan area)	Xindian	New Taipei
G05	Jingmei	景美	89	25	1999-11-11		Wenshan	Taipei
G06	Wanlong	萬隆	87	25	1999-11-11		Wenshan	Taipei
G07	Gongguan	公館	119	40	1999-11-11		Zhongzheng, Da'an	Taipei
G08	Taipower Building	台電大樓	67	40	1999-11-11		Zhongzheng, Da'an	Taipei
G09	Guting	古亭	88	40	1998-12-24	Zhonghe–Xinlu Line	Zhongzheng, Da'an	Taipei
G10	Chiang Kai-shek Memorial Hall	中正紀念堂	83	40	1998-12-24	(under construction)	Zhongzheng, Da'an	Taipei
G11	Xiaonanmen	小南門	75	40	2000-08-31		Zhongzheng	Taipei
G12	Ximen	西門	81	40	2000-08-31	Bannan Line	Wanhua, Zhongzheng	Taipei
G13	Beimen	北門	75	30	2014-11-15	(out of station interchange at Taipei Main Station) (Taipei Main Station)		Taipei
G14	Zhongshan	中山	114	35	2014-11-15	Tamsui–Xinyi Line	Zhongshan, Datong	Taipei
G15	Songjiang Nanjing	松江南京	106	35	2014-11-15	Zhonghe–Xinlu Line	Zhongshan	Taipei
G16	Nanjing Fuxing	南京復興	92	35	2014-11-15	Wenhu Line	Songshan, Zhongshan	Taipei
G17	Taipei Arena	臺北小巨蛋	84	30	2014-11-15		Songshan	Taipei
G18	Nanjing Sanmin	南京三民	102	30	2014-11-15		Songshan	Taipei
G19	Songshan	松山	138	—N/a	2014-11-15	Taiwan Railway	Songshan	Taipei

=== Xiaobitan branch line ===
Code	Station name		Transfer	District
Code	English	Chinese	Transfer	District
G03	Qizhang	七張	Songshan–Xindian Line	Xindian, New Taipei
G03A	Xiaobitan (Xindian Senior High School)	小碧潭 (新店高中)		Xindian, New Taipei

=== Zhonghe-Xinlu line ===
Code	Station name		Travel time to previous station (s)	Stop time at station (s)	Date opened	Transfer	Districts	City
Code	English	Chinese	Travel time to previous station (s)	Stop time at station (s)	Date opened	Transfer	Districts	City
O01	Nanshijiao	南勢角	—N/a	25	1998-12-24		Zhonghe	New Taipei
O02	Jingan	景安	103	25	1998-12-24	Circular Line (Taipei metropolitan area)	Zhonghe	New Taipei
O03	Yongan Market	永安市場	88	25	1998-12-24		Zhonghe	New Taipei
O04	Dingxi	頂溪	100	25	1998-12-24		Yonghe	New Taipei
O05	Guting	古亭	187	40	1998-12-24	Songshan–Xindian Line	Daan, Zhongzheng	Taipei
O06	Dongmen	東門	192	40	2012-09-30	Tamsui–Xinyi Line	Daan, Zhongzheng	Taipei
O07	Zhongxiao Xinsheng	忠孝新生	118	40	2010-11-03	Bannan Line	Daan, Zhongzheng	Taipei
O08	Songjiang Nanjing	松江南京	114	35	2010-11-03	Songshan–Xindian Line	Zhongshan	Taipei
O09	Xingtian Temple	行天宮	75	35	2010-11-03		Zhongshan	Taipei
O10	Zhongshan Elementary School	中山國小	89	35	2010-11-03		Zhongshan	Taipei
O11	Minquan West Road	民權西路	72	45	2010-11-03	Tamsui–Xinyi Line	Datong, Zhongshan	Taipei
O12	Daqiaotou	大橋頭	75	35	2010-11-03		Datong	Taipei
O13	Taipei Bridge	台北橋	115	25	2012-01-05		Sanchong	New Taipei
O14	Cailiao	菜寮	93	25	2012-01-05		Sanchong	New Taipei
O15	Sanchong	三重	84	25	2012-01-05	Taoyuan Airport MRT	Sanchong	New Taipei
O16	Xianse Temple	先嗇宮	142	25	2012-01-05		Sanchong	New Taipei
O17	Touqianzhuang	頭前庄	105	25	2012-01-05	Circular Line (Taipei metropolitan area)	Xinzhuang	New Taipei
O18	Xinzhuang	新莊	93	25	2012-01-05		Xinzhuang	New Taipei
O19	Fu Jen University	輔大	130	25	2012-01-05		Xinzhuang	New Taipei
O20	Danfeng	丹鳳	110	25	2013-06-29		Xinzhuang, Taishan	New Taipei
O21	Huilong	迴龍	159	—N/a	2013-06-29	(planned)	Guishan, Xinzhuang	New Taipei / Taoyuan
O50	Sanchong Elementary School	三重國小	148 (Note: to Daqiaotou)	30	2010-11-03		Sanchong	New Taipei
O51	Sanhe Junior High School	三和國中	104	30	2010-11-03		Sanchong	New Taipei
O52	St Ignatius High School	徐匯中學	82	30	2010-11-03	(planned)	Luzhou	New Taipei
O53	Sanmin Senior High School	三民高中	87	30	2010-11-03		Luzhou	New Taipei
O54	Luzhou	蘆洲	110	—N/a	2010-11-03		Luzhou	New Taipei

=== Bannan line ===
Code	Station name		Travel time to previous station (s)	Stop time at station (s)	Date opened	Transfer	Districts	City
Code	English	Chinese	Travel time to previous station (s)	Stop time at station (s)	Date opened	Transfer	Districts	City
BL01	Dingpu	頂埔	—N/a	25	2015-07-06	Sanying Line	Tucheng	New Taipei
BL02	Yongning	永寧	180	25	2006-05-31	(Pitang) (constructing)	Tucheng	New Taipei
BL03	Tucheng	土城	95	25	2006-05-31	(constructing)	Tucheng	New Taipei
BL04	Haishan	海山	106	25	2006-05-31	N/A	Tucheng	New Taipei
BL05	Far Eastern Hospital	亞東醫院	142	25	2006-05-31	N/A	Banqiao	New Taipei
BL06	Fuzhong	府中	92	25	2006-05-31	N/A	Banqiao	New Taipei
BL07	Banqiao	板橋	89	25	2006-05-31	(out of station)	Banqiao	New Taipei
BL08	Xinpu	新埔	102	25	2000-08-31	(Xinpu Minsheng)	Banqiao	New Taipei
BL09	Jiangzicui	江子翠	74	25	2000-08-31	N/A	Banqiao	New Taipei
BL10	Longshan Temple	龍山寺	190	28	1999-12-24	(Wanhua)	Wanhua	Taipei
BL11	Ximen	西門	103	30	1999-12-24	Songshan–Xindian Line	Zhongzheng, Wanhua	Taipei
BL12	Taipei Main Station	台北車站	132	40	1999-12-24	Taiwan Railway Taiwan High Speed Rail	Zhongzheng	Taipei
BL13	Shandao Temple	善導寺	64	30	1999-12-24	N/A	Zhongzheng	Taipei
BL14	Zhongxiao Xinsheng	忠孝新生	76	28	1999-12-24	Zhonghe–Xinlu Line	Daan, Zhongzheng	Taipei
BL15	Zhongxiao Fuxing	忠孝復興	84	40	1999-12-24	Wenhu Line	Daan	Taipei
BL16	Zhongxiao Dunhua	忠孝敦化	63	28	1999-12-24	N/A	Daan	Taipei
BL17	Sun Yat-sen Memorial Hall	國父紀念館	67	28	1999-12-24	N/A	Xinyi, Daan	Taipei
BL18	Taipei City Hall	市政府	72	28	1999-12-24	N/A	Xinyi	Taipei
BL19	Yongchun	永春	82	28	2000-12-30	N/A	Xinyi	Taipei
BL20	Houshanpi	後山埤	73	30	2000-12-30	N/A	Nangang, Xinyi	Taipei
BL21	Kunyang	昆陽	99	25	2000-12-30	N/A	Nangang	Taipei
BL22	Nangang	南港	105	25	2008-12-25	Taiwan Railway Taiwan High Speed Rail	Nangang	Taipei
BL23	Taipei Nangang Exhibition Center	南港展覽館	114	—N/a	2011-02-27	Wenhu Line	Nangang	Taipei

=== Circular line ===
Code	Station name		Transfer	District	City
Code	English	Chinese	Transfer	District	City
Y07	Dapinglin	大坪林	Songshan–Xindian Line	Xindian	New Taipei
Y08	Shisizhang	十四張	Ankeng LRT	Xindian	New Taipei
Y09	Xiulang Bridge	秀朗橋		Zhonghe	New Taipei
Y10	Jingping	景平		Zhonghe	New Taipei
Y11	Jingan	景安	Zhonghe–Xinlu Line	Zhonghe	New Taipei
Y12	Zhonghe	中和	(2027)	Zhonghe	New Taipei
Y13	Qiaohe	橋和		Zhonghe	New Taipei
Y14	Zhongyuan	中原		Zhonghe	New Taipei
Y15	Banxin	板新		Banqiao	New Taipei
Y16	Banqiao	板橋	(out of station)	Banqiao	New Taipei
Y17	Xinpu Minsheng	新埔民生	(out of station, at Xinpu)	Banqiao	New Taipei
Y18	Touqianzhuang	頭前庄	Zhonghe–Xinlu Line	Xinzhuang	New Taipei
Y19	Xingfu	幸福		Xinzhuang	New Taipei
Y20	New Taipei Industrial Park	新北產業園區	Taoyuan Airport MRT	Xinzhuang	New Taipei
