= Fuzhou railway station (Taiwan) =

Railway station in New Taipei, Taiwan

Fuzhou 浮洲
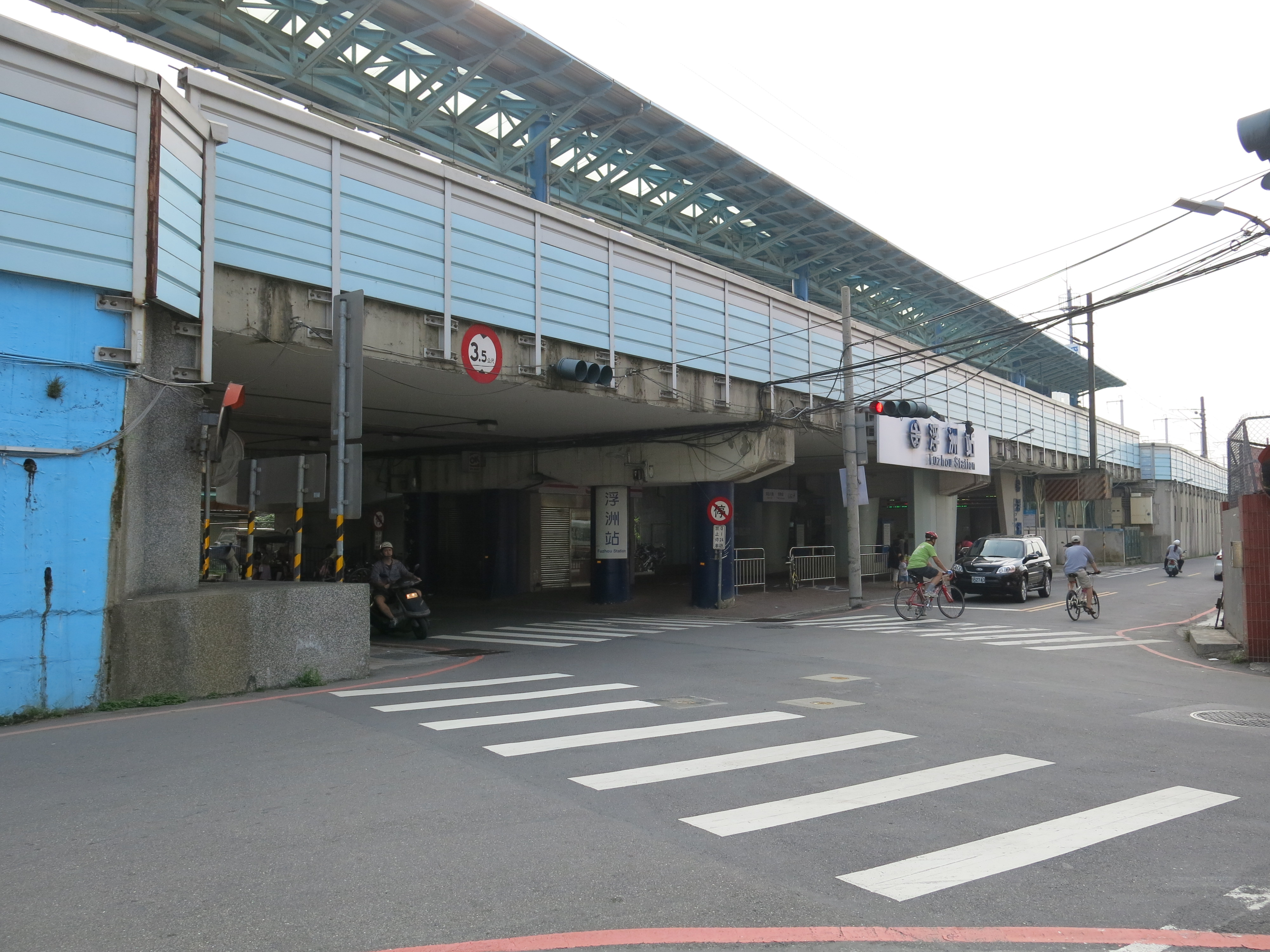

General information
- Location: 156 Qiaozhong 2 St. Banqiao, New Taipei, Taiwan
- Coordinates: 25.004203°N 121.444693°E
- Operated by: Taiwan Railway Corporation
- Line: Western Trunk line (264)
- Distance: 38 km from Keelung
- Platforms: 1 Island platform

Construction
- Structure type: Elevated

History
- Opened: 2 September 2011

Passengers
- 6,672 daily (2024)

Services
Preceding station	Taiwan Railway	Following station
Banqiao towards Keelung	Western Trunk line	Shulin towards Kaohsiung
Location

Fuzhou (Chinese: 浮洲車站; pinyin: Fúzhōu Chēzhàn) is a railway station on Taiwan Railway West Coast line located in Banqiao District, New Taipei, Taiwan.

== History ==
This was first opened in 1932 as a temporary station. It was closed in 1942, reopened in 1953, but ceased to operate soon afterwards. The new station began to operate on 2 September 2011, as a result of TRA's policy of transforming its railroad lines into an MRT-type railroad.

The only train that stops at this station is the local train. The station is located at the outskirts of Banqiao, and is mostly used by commuters.

== Around the station ==
Schools and universities

- National Taiwan University of Arts (450m to the northeast)
- National Overseas Chinese Senior High School (300m to the north)

Parks

- 浮洲親民公園 (750m to the south)
- Fuzhou Art Riverside Park (1.4km to the southwest)

== See also ==
- List of railway stations in Taiwan
