= Xinpu Minsheng metro station =

Metro station in New Tapei, Taiwan

Xinpu Minsheng 新埔民生
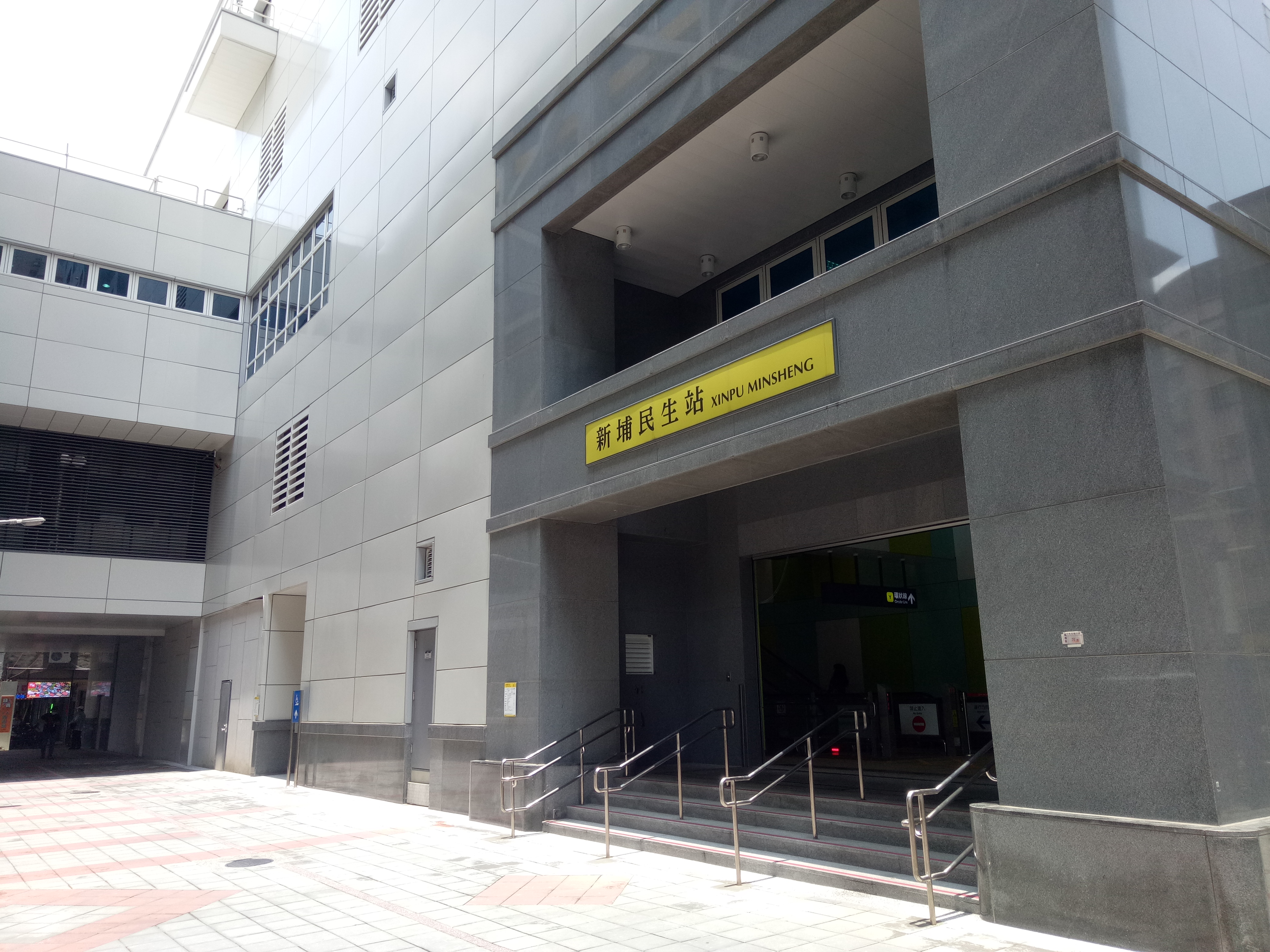
- Station entrance

Chinese name
- Chinese: 新埔民生
Transcriptions
Standard Mandarin
- Hanyu Pinyin: Xīnpǔ Mínshēng
- Bopomofo: ㄒㄧㄣ ㄆㄨˇㄇㄧㄣˊㄕㄥ
- Wade–Giles: Hsin¹-p'u³ Min²-sheng¹
Hakka
- Pha̍k-fa-sṳ: Sîn-phû Mìn-sâng
Southern Min
- Tâi-lô: Sin-poo Bîn-sing

General information
- Location: Banqiao, New Taipei; Taiwan
- Coordinates: 25.0261°N 121.4667°E
- Operator: New Taipei Metro
- Line: Circular line (Y17)
- Connections: Bannan line (via Xinpu); Bus stop

Construction
- Structure type: Elevated

Other information
- Station code: Y17

History
- Opened: 31 January 2020

Passengers
- 7,039 daily (December 2024)
- Rank: (Ranked 111 of 119)

Services
| Preceding station | New Taipei Metro | Following station |
|---|---|---|
| Banqiao towards Dapinglin | Circular line | Touqianzhuang towards NT Industrial Park |
| Preceding station | Taipei Metro | Following station |
| Banqiao towards Dingpu | Bannan line transfer at Xinpu | Jiangzicui towards Nangang Exhib Center |
Location

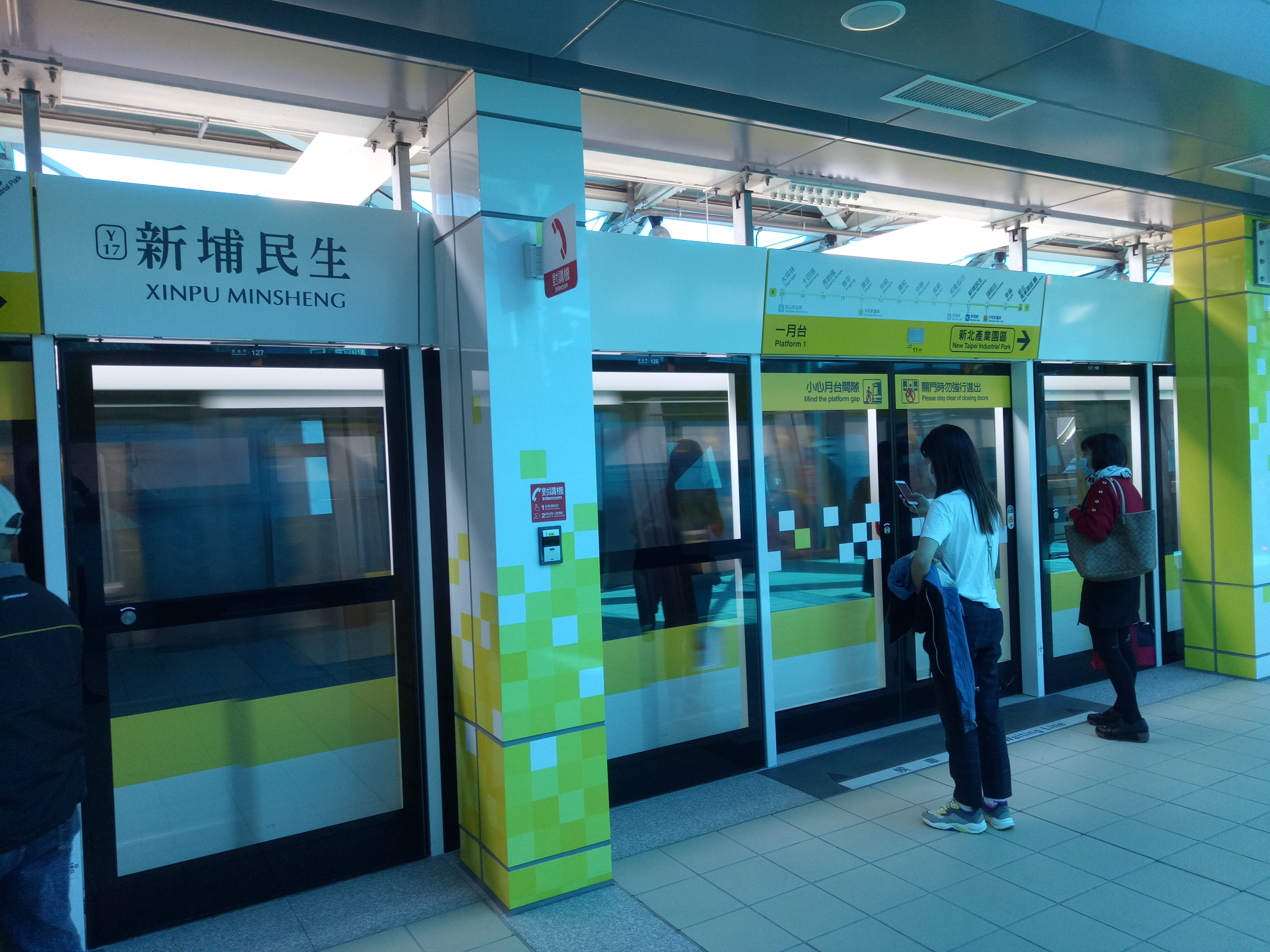
Platform 1

Xinpu Minsheng station is a station on the New Taipei Metro's Circular line. The station was opened on 31 January 2020. It is located in Banqiao District, New Taipei, Taiwan.

An out-of-station transfer to the Bannan line is available through Xinpu metro station. The two stations are roughly 250 m apart.

== Station layout ==
4F
| 4F | Side platform, doors will open on the right |
| 4F | Platform 1 | ← Circular line toward New Taipei Industrial Park (Y18 Touqianzhuang) |
| 4F | Platform 2 | → Circular line toward Dapinglin (Y16 Banqiao) → |
| 4F | Side platform, doors will open on the right |
| 3F | Concourse | Lobby, information desk, automatic ticket machines, one-way faregates, shops, restrooms (inside paid area) |
| Street level | Ground level | Entrance/exit |

== Exits ==
- Single exit: Section 3, Minsheng Rd.

== Around the station ==
- Banqiao Siwei Park (300m southwest of the station)
- Chihlee University of Technology (700m south of the station)
- Zhaoyang Vegetable Market (朝陽菜市場) (800m northwest of the station)
- Yumin Night Market (裕民夜市) (850m northwest of the station)
- Banqiao Civil Sports Center (1.3km southwest of the station)
- Xinhai Man-made Wetlands (新海第一期人工濕地) (1.5km northwest of the station)
- Rose Park (1.5km west of the station)
- Banqiao 435 Art Zone (1.9km west of the station)
