= 府中 =

府中 may refer to:

- Fuchū (disambiguation), the name of several places in Japan
- Fuzhong metro station, a metro station in New Taipei, Taiwan

== See also ==
- The dictionary definition of 府 at Wiktionary
- The dictionary definition of 中 at Wiktionary
