= Fuzhong =

Fuzhong may refer to:

- Fuzhong (附中), “High School under university” for Chinese
- Fuzhong metro station, a station of the Bannan line operated by the Taipei Metro in New Taipei City.
- Fuzhong Village (福中里), an urban village in Xitun District, Taichung, Taiwan.
