= Zheng Jiachun =

Zheng Jiachun may refer to:

- Henry Cheng (born 1946), Hong Kong businessman
- Ili Cheng (born 1993), Taiwanese actress
