= Xinpu station =

Xinpu station may refer to:

- Xinpu metro station, a metro station on the Taipei Metro Bannan line
- Xinpu railway station, a railway station on the Taiwan Railways Administration West Coast line

== See also ==
- Xinpu Minsheng metro station
- Lianyungang railway station, once named as Xinpu railway station (Chinese: 新浦站), a station in Haizhou District, Lianyungang, Jiangsu
