= Xinpu =

Xinpu may refer to:

== China ==
- Xinpu District (新浦区), a former district in Lianyungang, Jiangsu, now part of Haizhou District
- Xinpu, Cixi (新浦镇), town in Cixi, Ningbo, Zhejiang
- Xinpu, Jiaoling (新铺镇), a town in Jiaoling County, Meizhou, Guangdong
- Xinpu, Shimen (新铺乡), a township in Shimen County, Changde, Hunan

== Taiwan ==
- Xinpu, Hsinchu (新埔鎮), urban township in Hsinchu County

== See also ==
- Xinpu station (disambiguation)
