= Railway Bureau (Taiwan) =

Government agency of the Republic of China

- 交通部鐵道局
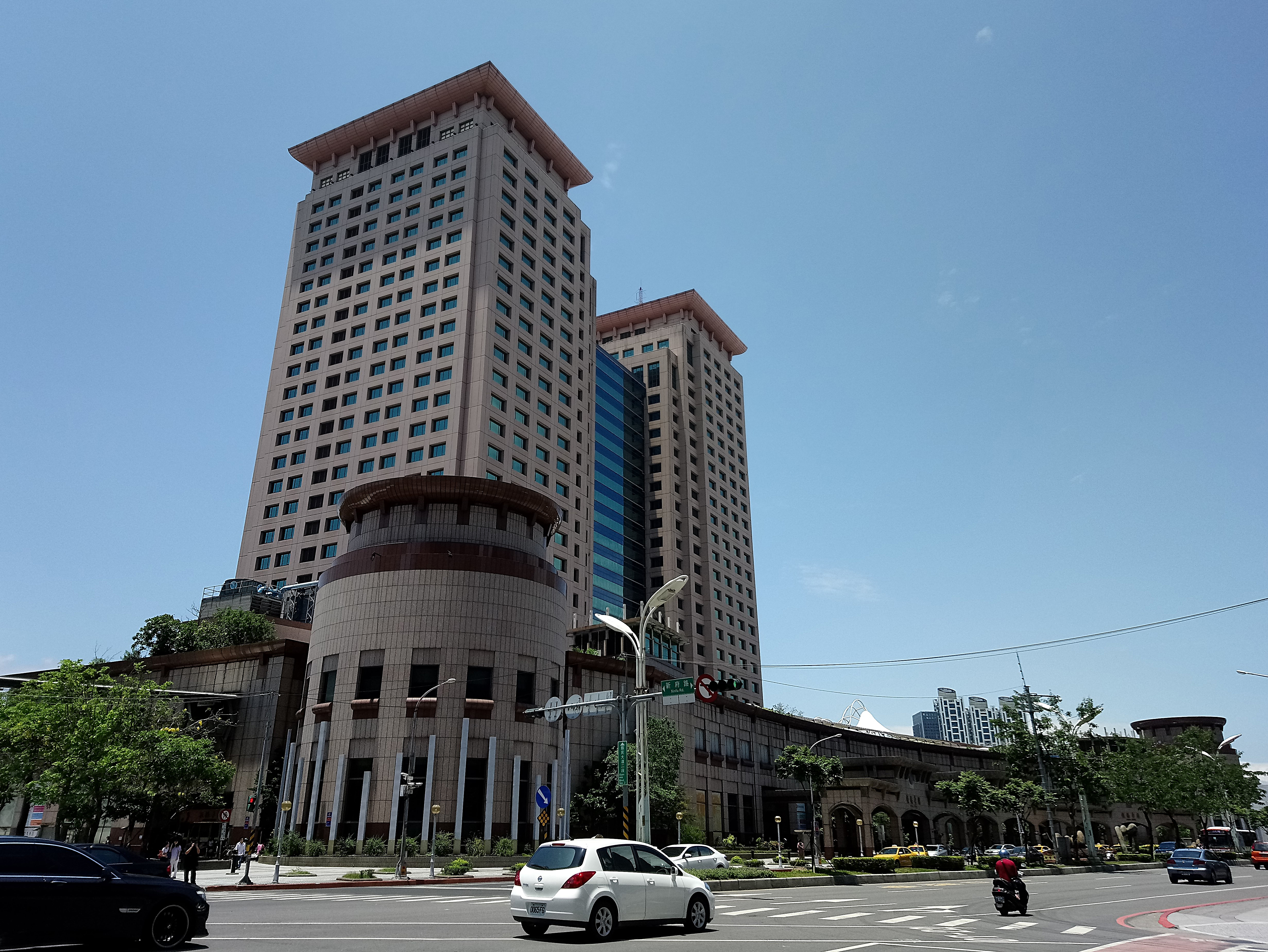
- Headquarters of the Railway Bureau

Agency overview
- Formed: 2018-6-11
- Preceding agencies: Bureau of High Speed Rail; Railway Reconstruction Bureau
- Headquarters: Banqiao, New Taipei, Taiwan
- Parent agency: Ministry of Transportation and Communications
- Website: www.rb.gov.tw

The Railway Bureau (RB; traditional Chinese: 交通部鐵道局; simplified Chinese: 交通部铁道局; pinyin: Jiāotōng Bù Tiědào Jú) is the government agency of the Ministry of Transportation and Communications of Taiwan responsible for the public works construction, supervision, management and other related affairs of railway, MRT and other railway transportation systems.

== History ==
The bureau was established on 11 June 2018, in accordance with the Organization Act of the Railway Bureau, Ministry of Transportation and Communications. It was established under the Ministry of Transportation and Communications (MOTC).

The bureau was formed by a merger between two bureaus under the MOTC, the Bureau of High Speed Rail and the Railway Reconstruction Bureau.

In 2021, the Railway Bureau established the Railway Technology Research and Certification Center (RTRCC). The center is tasked with increasing the proportion of locally made railway components used by the Taiwan Railways Administration and light-rail systems from 42 percent to 70 percent within 10 years.

About 15 percent of the components used in the high-speed rail and MRT systems are made locally, the MOTC said in 2018, adding that it hoped the Railway Bureau can increase this figure by 3 percent annually.

== Organizational structure ==
The organizational structure of the bureau is as follows:

- Planning Division
- Civil and Architectural Engineering Division
- Electrical and Mechanical Technology Division
- Engineering Management Division
- Operation Supervision Division
- Assets Management and Development Division
- Northern Region Engineering Branch Office
- Central Region Engineering Branch Office
- Southern Region Engineering Branch Office
- Eastern Region Engineering Branch Office
- Information Management Office
- Legal Affairs Office
- Secretariat Office
- Personnel Office
- Civil Service Ethics Office
- Accounting and Statistics Office

== See also ==
- Rail transport in Taiwan
- Transportation in Taiwan
