= Banqiao station =

Railway station in New Taipei, Taiwan

Banqiao 板橋
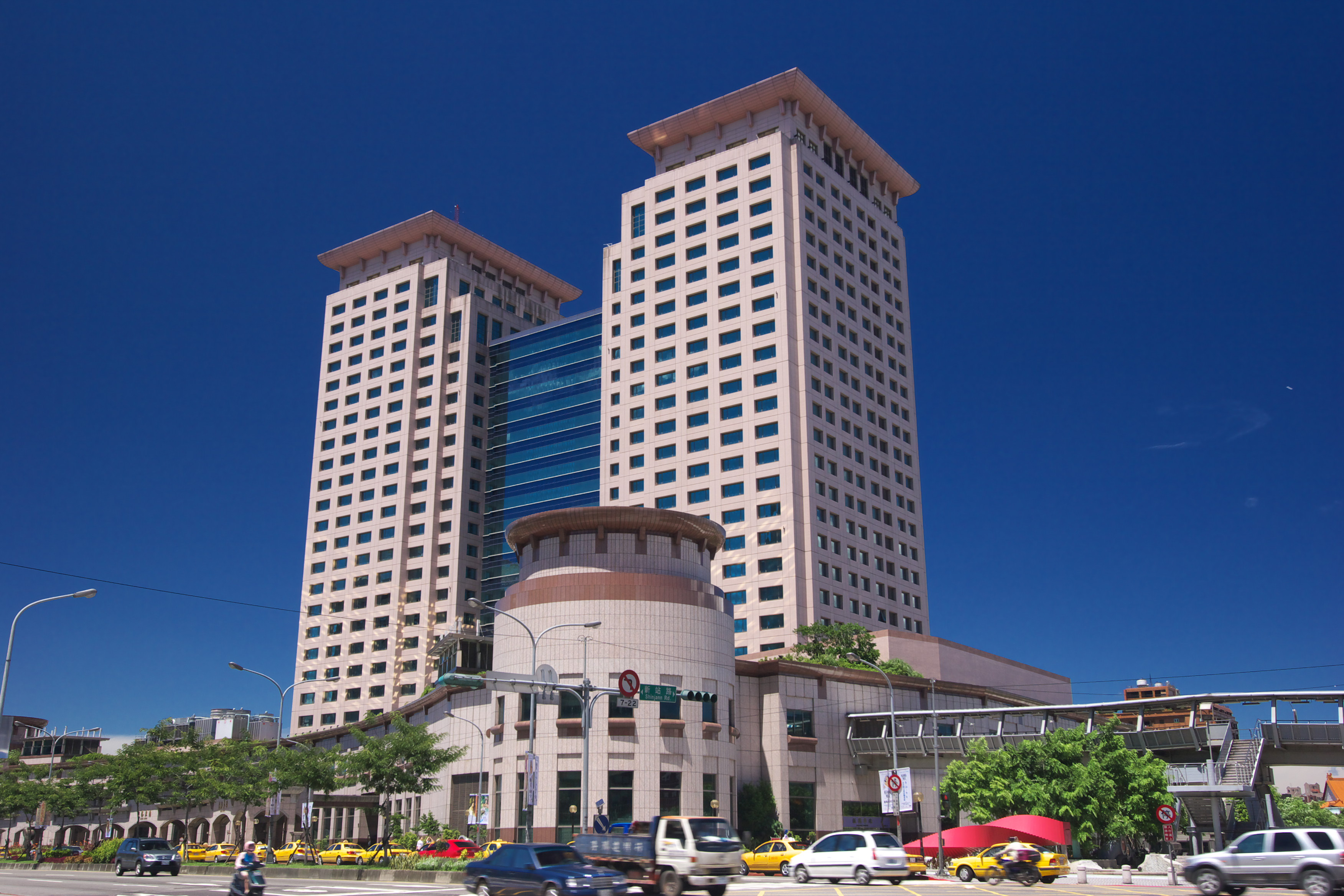

Chinese name
- Traditional Chinese: 板橋
- Simplified Chinese: 板桥
Transcriptions
Standard Mandarin
- Hanyu Pinyin: Bǎnqiáo
- Bopomofo: ㄅㄢˇ ㄑㄧㄠˊ
- Wade–Giles: Pan³-ch'iao²
Hakka
- Pha̍k-fa-sṳ: Piông-khièu
Southern Min
- Tâi-lô: Pang-kiô

General information
- Location: 7 Sec 2 Xianmin Blvd; Banqiao, New Taipei, Taiwan
- Coordinates: 25.0144°N 121.4635°E
- System: THSR and TRA railway station
- Distance: 13 km (THSR); 35.5 km to Keelung (TRA)
- Connections: Rapid transit; Local bus; Coach

Construction
- Structure type: Underground

Other information
- Station code: BAQ／03 (THSR); 102 (TRA three-digit); 1011 (TRA four-digit); A13 (TRA statistical); ㄅㄢ (TRA telegraph)
- Classification: First class (Chinese: 一等) (TRA)

History
- Opened: 25 August 1901
- Rebuilt: 21 July 1999
- Electrified: 9 January 1978

Key dates
- 20 January 1996: Rebuilt
- 5 January 2007: THSR opened

Passengers
- 2018: 8.320 million per year ▲5.56% (THSR)
- Rank: 7 out of 12
- 2017: 15.852 million per year ▲0.66% (TRA)
- Rank: 6 out of 228

Services
Preceding station	Taiwan High Speed Rail	Following station
Taipei towards Nangang	THSR	Taoyuan towards Zuoying
Preceding station	Taiwan Railway	Following station
Wanhua towards Keelung	Western Trunk line	Fuzhou towards Kaohsiung
Location
- Location within Taiwan

Banqiao / 板橋
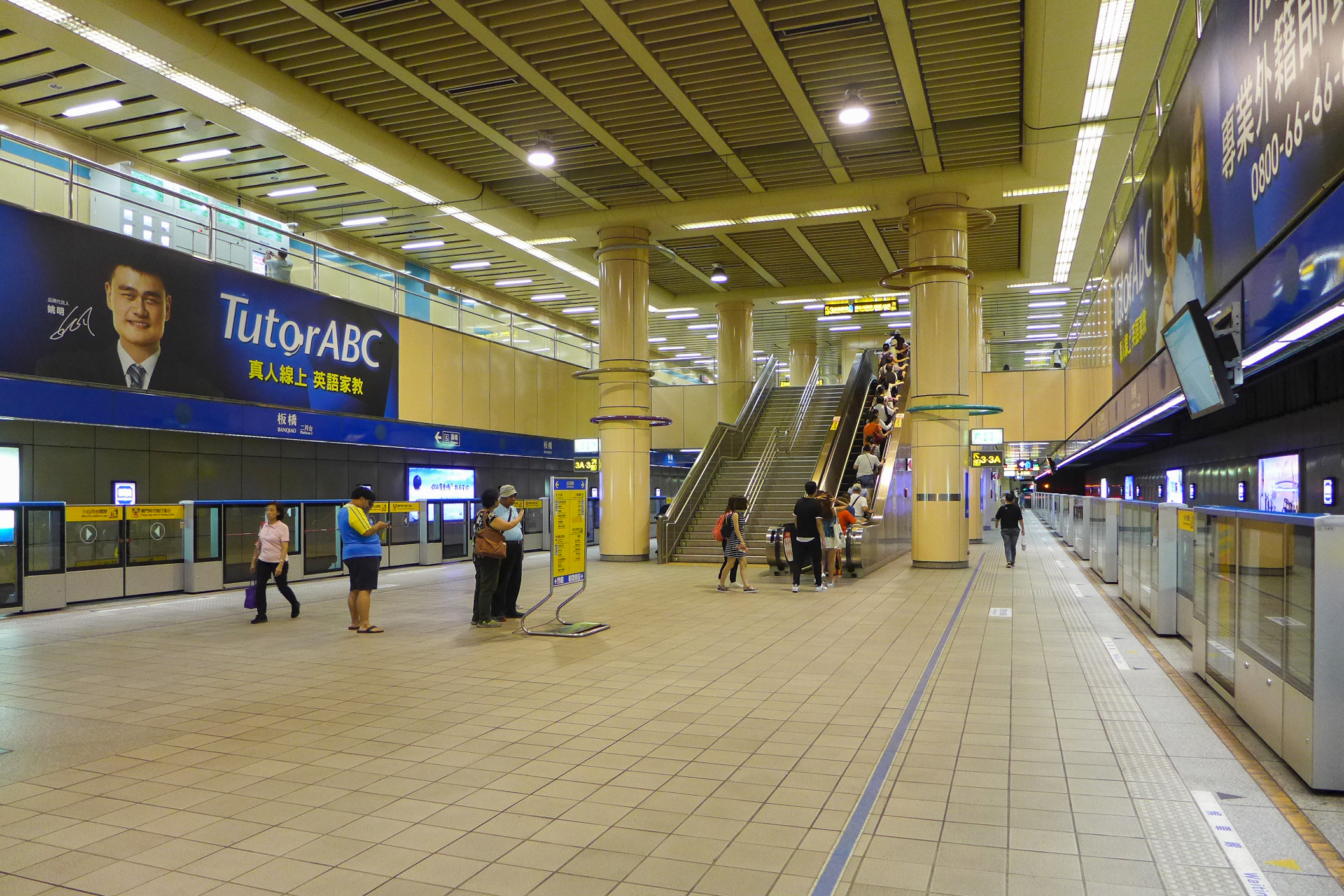
- Bannan line Platform

Chinese name
- Traditional Chinese: 板橋
- Simplified Chinese: 板桥
Transcriptions
Standard Mandarin
- Hanyu Pinyin: Bǎnqiáo
- Bopomofo: ㄅㄢˇ ㄑㄧㄠˊ
- Wade–Giles: Pan³-ch'iao²
Hakka
- Pha̍k-fa-sṳ: Piông-khièu
Southern Min
- Tâi-lô: Pang-kiô

General information
- Location: B1F 5 Zhanqian Rd; Banqiao District, New Taipei; Taiwan
- System: Taipei and New Taipei metro station
- Lines: Bannan line; Circular line

Construction
- Structure type: Underground (BL07); Elevated (Y16)
- Cycle facilities: Access available (BL)

Other information
- Station code: /

History
- Opened: 31 May 2006

Passengers
- 2017: 29.959 million per year ▲2.28%
- Rank: (Ranked of 119)

Services
Preceding station	Taipei Metro	Following station
Fuzhong towards Dingpu	Bannan line	Xinpu towards Nangang Exhib Center
Preceding station	New Taipei Metro	Following station
Banxin towards Dapinglin	Circular line	Xinpu Minsheng towards NT Industrial Park
Location

Banqiao (Chinese: 板橋) is a railway and metro station in New Taipei, Taiwan, served by Taiwan High Speed Rail (THSR), Taiwan Railway, Taipei Metro and New Taipei Metro. With the exception of the Circular Line, all other tracks and platforms in the station are located underground. The station is served by the fastest HSR express services of the 1 series.

The current station building opened in 1999 for TRA, 2006 for Taipei Metro, and 2007 for HSR. The station currently handles over 77 million entries and exits per year. The elevated metro station of the Circular line (New Taipei Metro) opened on 31 January 2020.

== Station overview ==
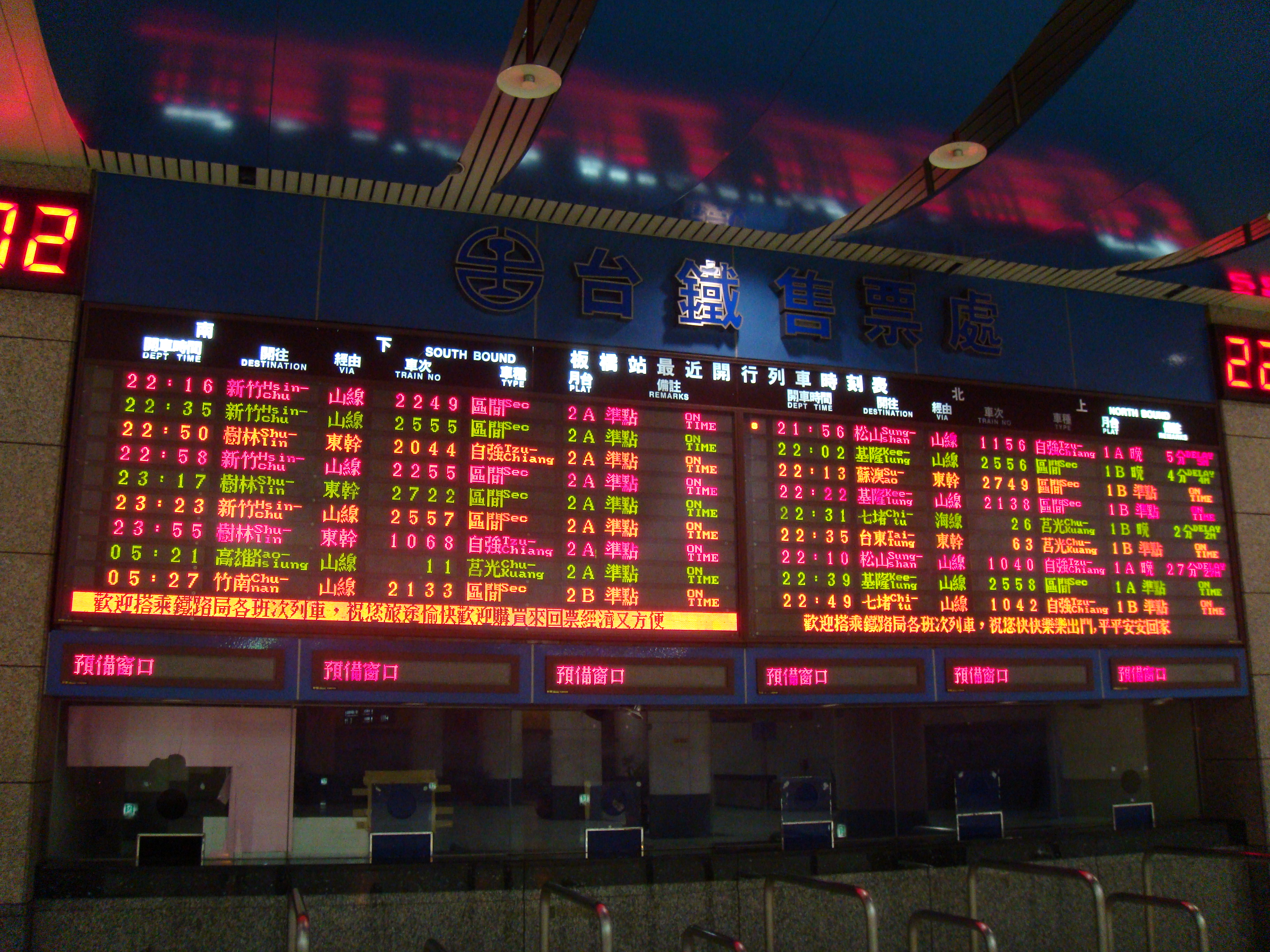
Taiwan Railways Administration information board

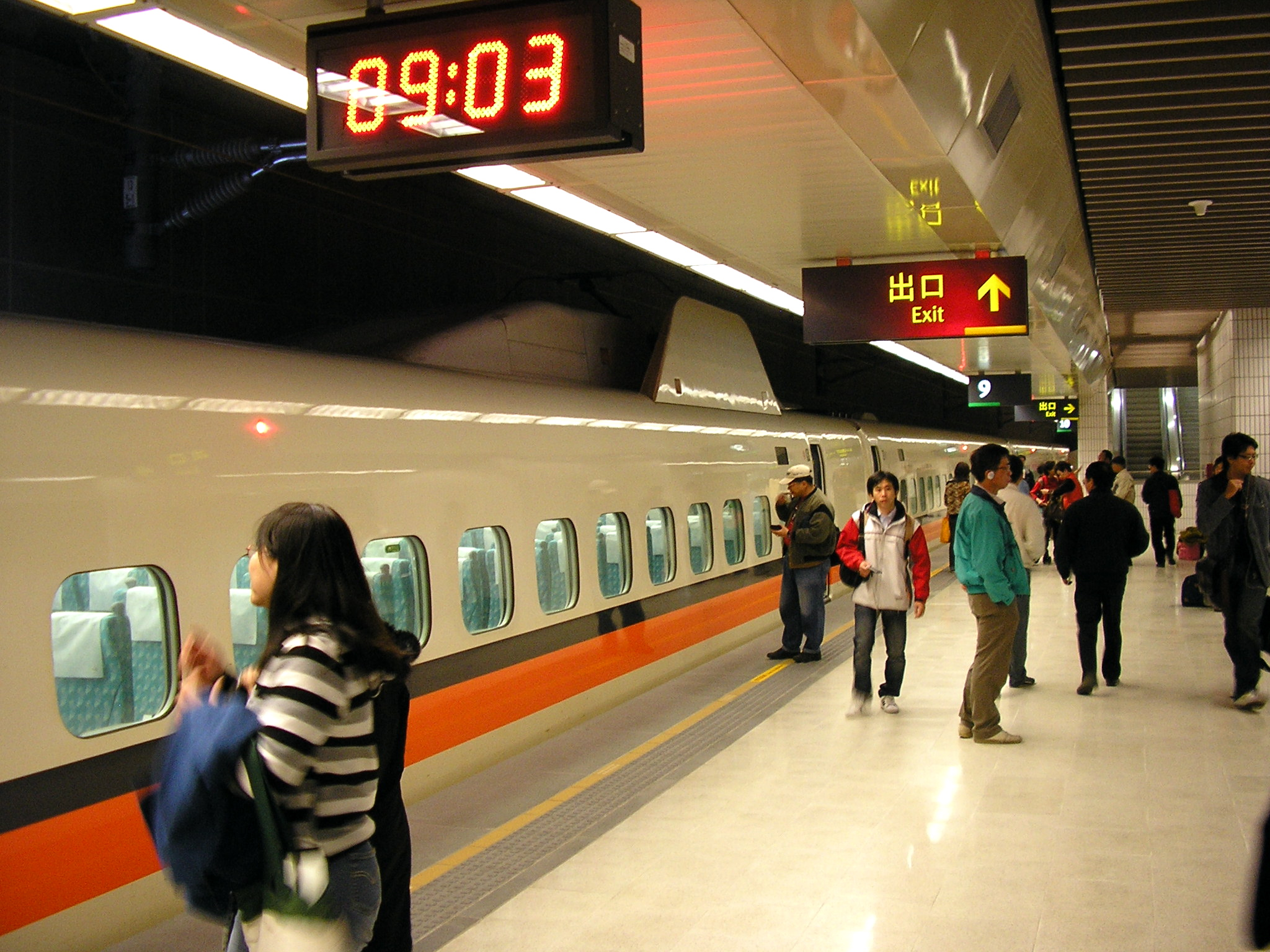
Taiwan High Speed Rail platform

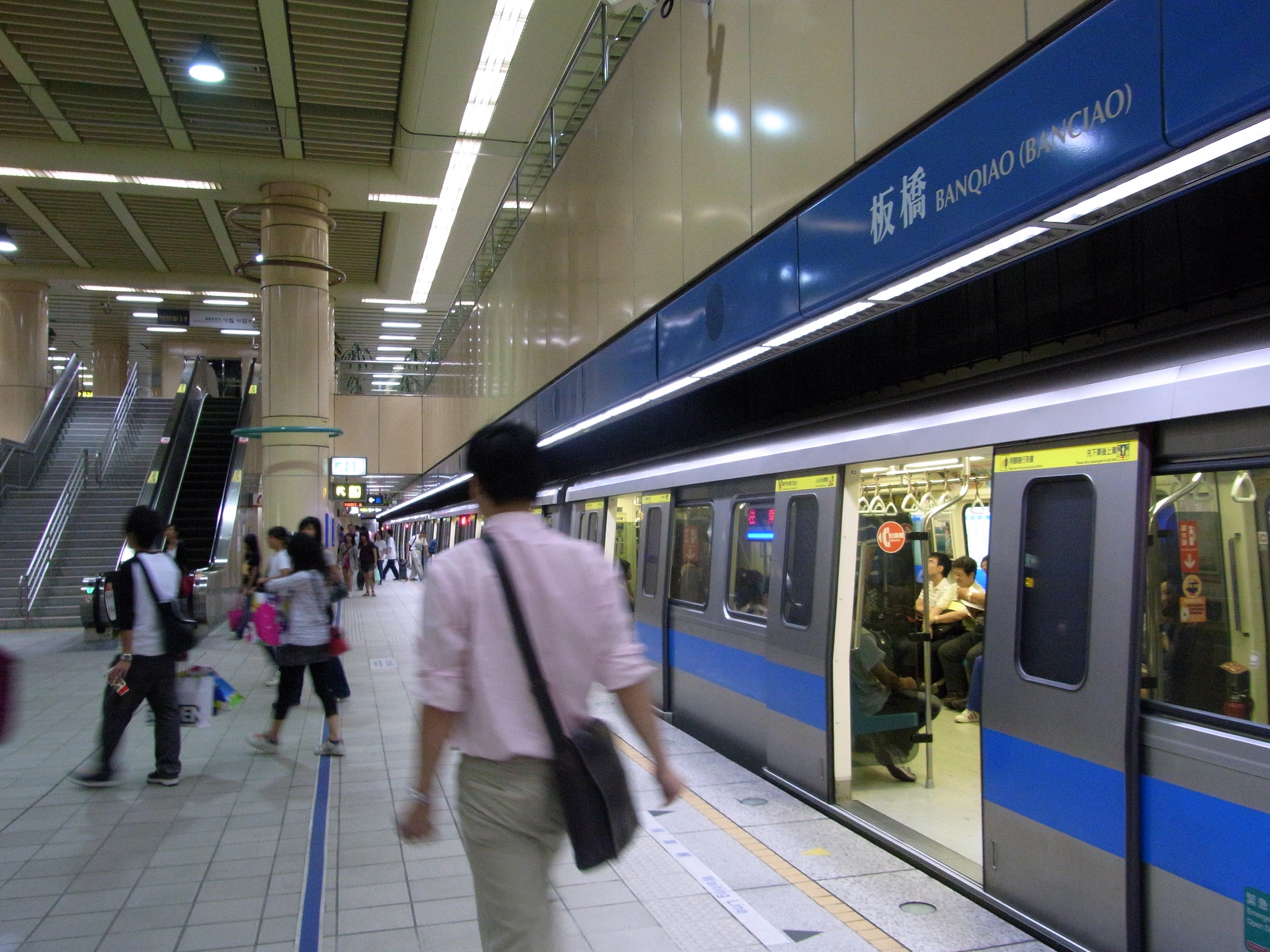
Taipei Metro Platform 1

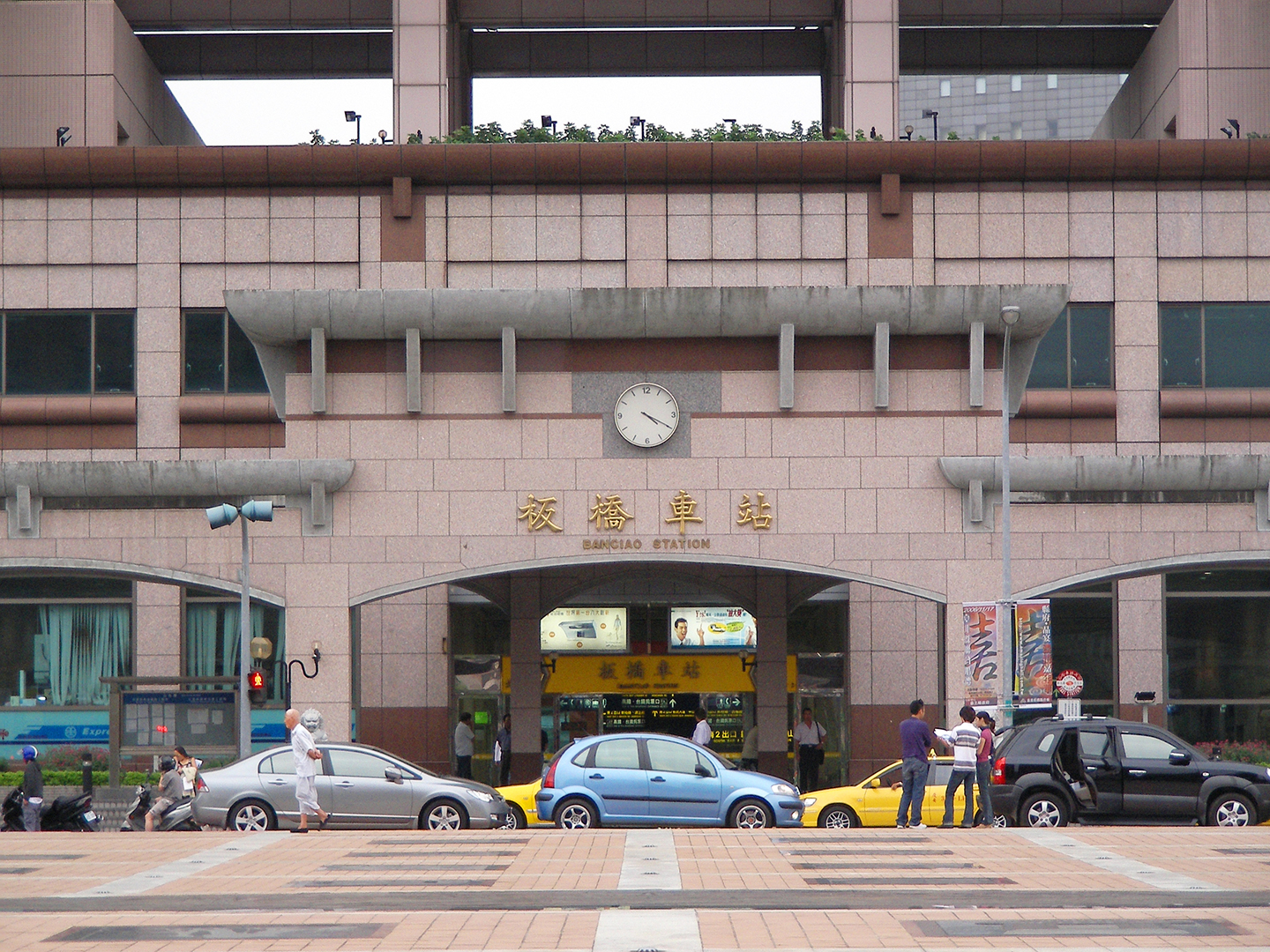
Banqiao Station entrance

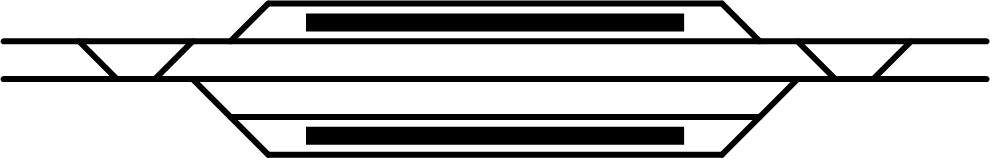
TRA train tracks layout

The station consists of a 25-story building above ground and five underground station stories; it is Taiwan's tallest station building. It includes platforms for the TRA, THSR, Taipei Metro and New Taipei Metro. The new station building was built as part of the Taipei Railway Underground Project to move railway lines in the city underground.

=== Public art ===
Titled "Evolution Orbit", the Bannan line platform has artwork consisting of 12 colorful rings affixed to columns on the platform. These rings complete a cycle every hour and also move whenever a train enters the station.

The platforms, walls and ceilings of the Circular line are decorated by French artist Daniel Buren, using regular, contrasting coloured stripes.

== Station layout ==
24F-25F
Fitness center
Global Sports
3F-23F
Offices
Financial Supervisory Commission

Intellectual Property Court

Ministry of Transportation and Communications - Railway Bureau

New Taipei City Vocational Training Center

4F
Circular Line
Platforms-connecting overpass
Overpass
Out-of-station overpass（toward HSR station）
3F
Circular Line
Concourse
Lobby, information desk, automatic ticket machines, one-way faregates, restrooms
Side platform, doors will open on the right
Platform 1
← Circular line toward New Taipei Industrial Park (Y17 Xinpu Minsheng)
Platform 2
Circular line toward Dapinglin (Y15 Banxin) →
Side platform, doors will open on the right

2F
Shopping area

Restaurants

Global Mall Banqiao Store
Connecting overpass (toward Circular line Banqiao station/Banqiao bus station)
Street level
Lobby shopping area
Entrance/exit, TRA ticketing, information counter

Global Mall Banqiao Store

B1
TRA/THSR lobby

Shopping area

Food court

THSR ticketing/faregates
TRA ticket gate
Travel information counter

Global Mall Banqiao Store

Underground walkway
Restrooms, infant room
New Taipei City Low-Carbon Library

Underground walkway (connects with Metro)
Metro lobby
Underground walkway (connects with TRA/THSR)
B2
Platform 1A
West Coast line toward Taipei, Keelung/Yilan (Wanhua)
Island platform
Platform 1B
West Coast line toward Taipei, Keelung/Yilan (Wanhua)
No platform
Through track (freight/passing/train parking...)
Platform 2A
West Coast line toward Kaohsiung (Shulin)
Island platform
Platform 2B
West Coast line toward Kaohsiung (Shulin)
Platform 1A
THSR toward Zuoying (Taoyuan)
Island platform
Platform 1B
THSR toward Zuoying (Taoyuan)
Metro lobby
Information desk, restrooms (outside fare zone), automatic ticket dispensing machines
One-way faregates
B3
Platform 1
← Bannan line toward Nangang Exhib Center / Kunyang (BL08 Xinpu)
Island platform, doors will open on the left
Platform 2
Bannan line toward Dingpu / Far Eastern Hospital (BL06 Fuzhong) →
Platform 2A
THSR toward Nangang (Taipei)
Island platform
Platform 2B
THSR toward Nangang (Taipei)

== HSR services ==
HSR services (1)1xx, (1)2xx, (Note: except 295 and 1202) (1)5xx, (Note: except 583 and 598) (1)6xx, and 8xx call at this station.

== Around the station ==
Transport stations

- Intercity bus station (next to the station)
- Local bus station (next to the station)

Government offices

- New Taipei City Hall (500m to the southeast)
- Railway Bureau, MOTC (inside the station)

Stadiums and parks

- Banqiao Stadium (950m to the west)
- Xianmin (Note: Xianmin means "County Resident;" this refers to Taipei County before its upgrade to city status in 2010; however, the name of the plaza has remain unchanged.) Plaza (100m to the southeast)

Schools

- New Taipei Municipal Banqiao High School (between this station and Fuzhong Station)
- New Taipei Municipal Haishan High School (850m to the southeast)
- New Taipei Municipal Zhongshan Junior High School (750m to the northeast)

Shopping malls

- Mega City (250m to the southeast)
- Far Eastern Department Store (350m to the south)

Medical facilities

- Hsiao Chung-Cheng Hospital (near Fuzhong Station)

== See also ==
- List of railway stations in Taiwan
