= Banqiao 435 Art Zone =

Art center in Banqiao, New Taipei, Taiwan

- 板橋435藝文特區
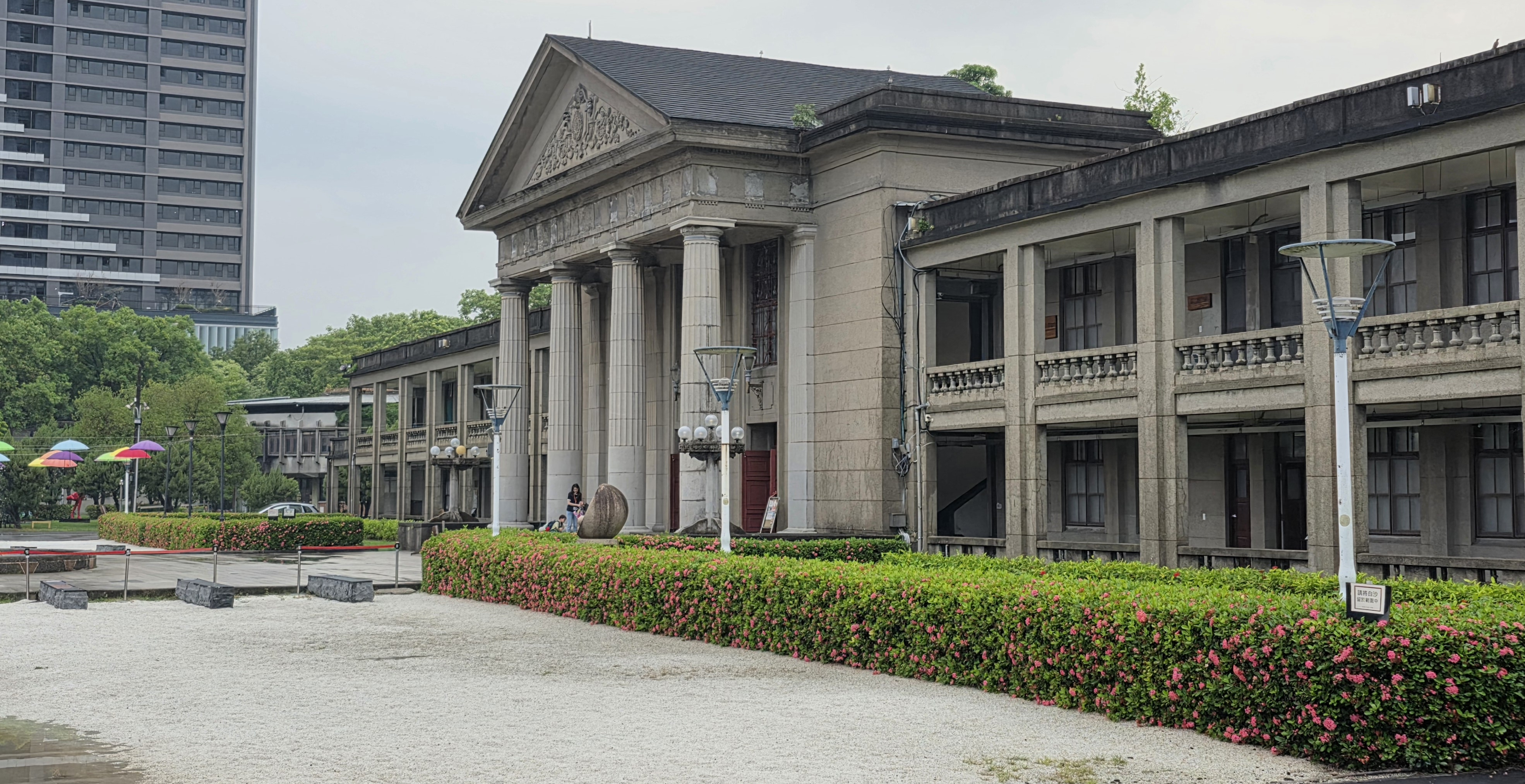
- Zhongzheng Memorial Hall
- Interactive map of Banqiao 435 Art Zone
- Location: Banqiao, New Taipei, Taiwan
- Coordinates: 25°01′27.1″N 121°27′08.2″E
- Type: art center

Website
- en.435.culture.ntpc.gov.tw

The Banqiao 435 Art Zone (traditional Chinese: 板橋435藝文特區; simplified Chinese: 板桥435艺文特区; pinyin: Bǎnqiáo 435 Yìwén Tèqū) is an art center in Banqiao District, New Taipei, Taiwan.

== History ==
The area used to be old housing areas for veterans training. In 2012, the Cultural Affairs Department of New Taipei City Government assumed responsibility for the building which was once used as the job training center by the central government from Banqiao District Office.

== Architecture ==
The building features a neoclassic architectural style with large open space. At the entrance lies the Zhongzheng Memorial Hall, with facade constructed by the towering and symmetrical Doric columns and carved mountain walls. It also features some indoor spaces used as studios for emerging artists. It spans over an area of 5 hectares.

== Activities ==
The center regularly holds exhibitions, art classes and educational activities. It also collaborate with other organizations and schools for street performances and various exhibitions and events.

== Transportation ==
The center is accessible within walking distance south of Xinzhuang Station of Taipei Metro.

== See also ==
- List of tourist attractions in Taiwan
