= Xinpu metro station =

Metro station in New Taipei, Taiwan

Xinpu 新埔
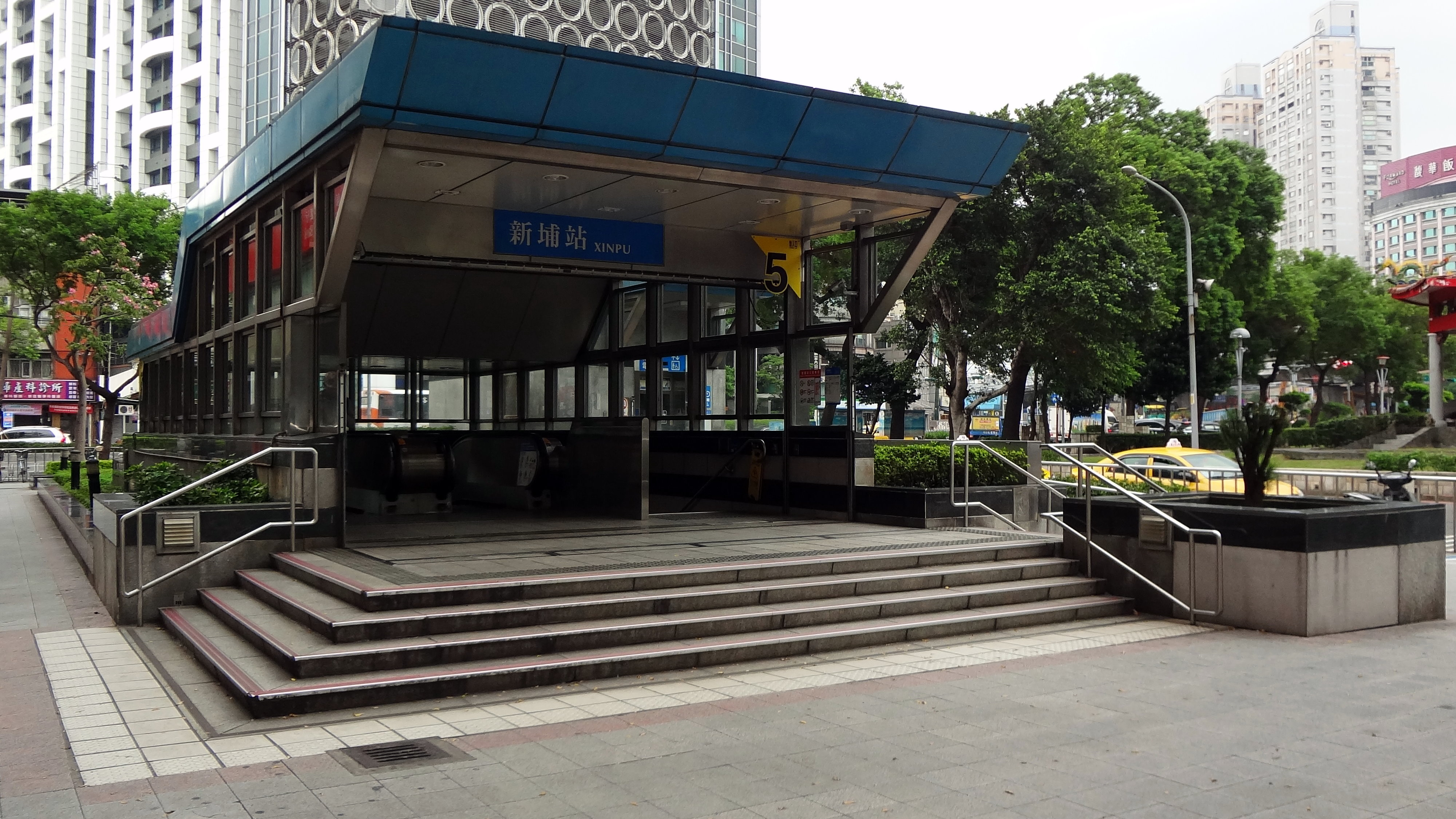

Chinese name
- Chinese: 新埔
- Literal meaning: Newly developed land
Transcriptions
Standard Mandarin
- Hanyu Pinyin: Xīnpǔ
- Bopomofo: ㄒㄧㄣ ㄆㄨˇ
- Wade–Giles: Hsin¹-p'u³
Hakka
- Pha̍k-fa-sṳ: Sîn-phû
Southern Min
- Tâi-lô: Sin-poo

General information
- Location: B1F 268 Sec 1 Wenhua Rd; Banqiao District, New Taipei; Taiwan
- Coordinates: 25.0231°N 121.4681°E
- System: Taipei metro station
- Line: Bannan line
- Connections: Circular line (via Xinpu Minsheng)

Construction
- Structure type: Underground
- Cycle facilities: Access available

Other information
- Station code: BL08
- Website: web.metro.taipei/e/stationdetail2010.asp?ID=BL08-083

History
- Opened: 2000-08-31

Passengers
- 2017: 27.523 million per year ▼1.52%
- Rank: (Ranked 8 of 119)

Services
Preceding station	Taipei Metro	Following station
Banqiao towards Dingpu	Bannan line	Jiangzicui towards Nangang Exhib Center
Preceding station	New Taipei Metro	Following station
Banqiao towards Dapinglin	Circular line transfer at Xinpu Minsheng	Touqianzhuang towards NT Industrial Park
Location

Xinpu (Chinese: 新埔, formerly transliterated as Hsinpu Station until 2003) is a metro station in New Taipei, Taiwan served by Taipei Metro. It is a station on the Bannan line. It is an out-of-station interchange with Xinpu Minsheng station on the Circular line, which is 250 meters away.

== Station overview ==
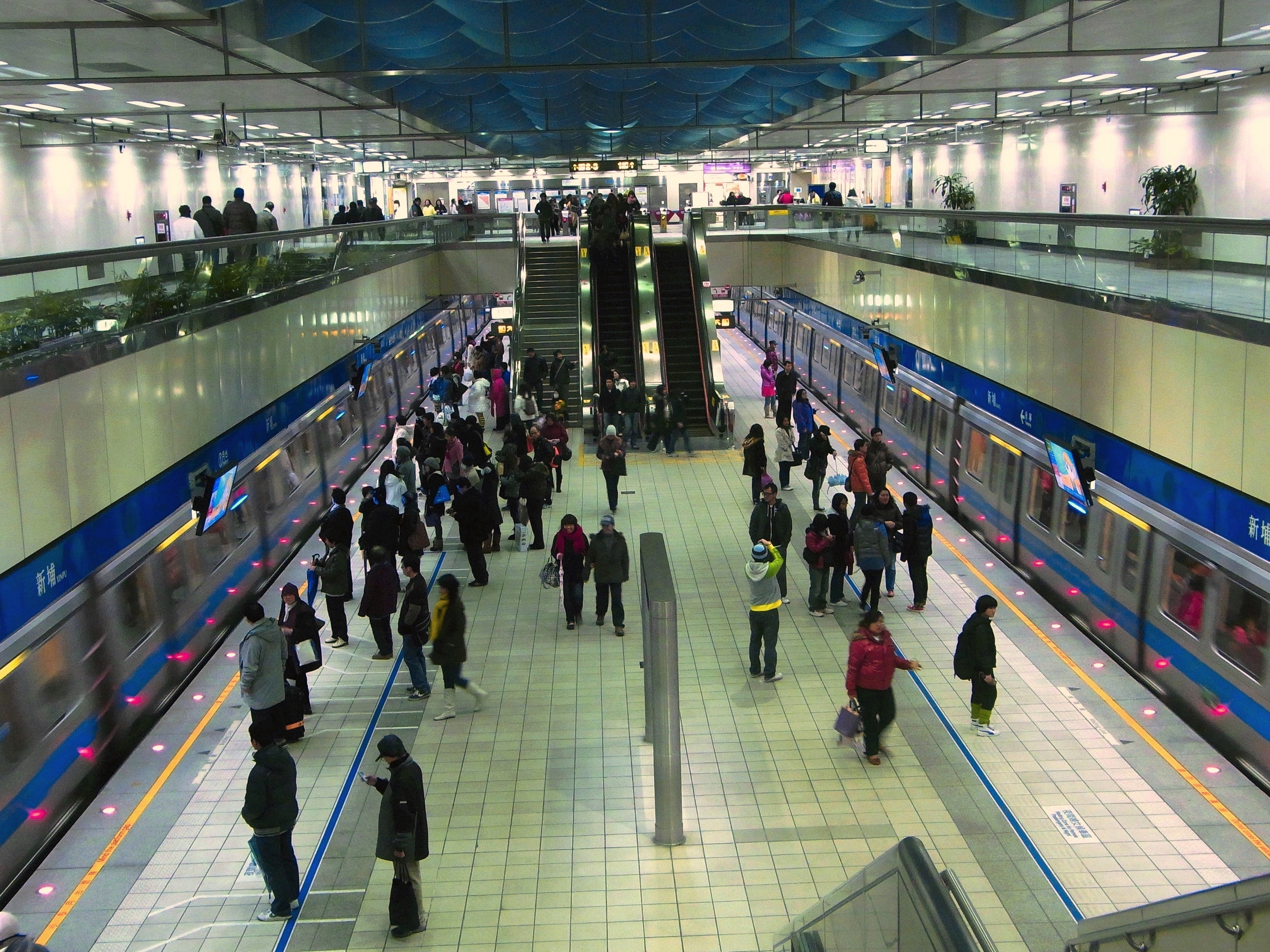
Platform at Xinpu station

This two-level, underground station has an island platform and four exits. It is an out-of-station interchange with Xinpu Minsheng station on the Circular line, which is 250 meters away.

Because the Circular line was originally planned to make a regular interchange within Xinpu station, Xinpu station adapts a concourse design similar to that of Zhongxiao Fuxing station. However, after considering that the Circular line could benefit a lot more if it set up a station at Banqiao on the Bannan line, giving the ability to also transfer to Taiwan Railway, THSR and long-distance buses, it was decided that the Circular line be set up at Banqiao station, which has caused the two out-of-station interchanges at Banqiao and Xinpu/Xinpu Minsheng.

=== History ===
- 31 August 2000: Opened for service with the opening of the segment between Jiangzicui and Xinpu.
- 31 May 2006: Service was extended through to Fuzhong, thus joining with the Tucheng line.

== Station layout ==
Street level	Entrance/exit	Entrance/exit
B1	Concourse	Lobby, automatic ticket dispensing machine, information desk, one-way faregates Restrooms (north side, outside fare zone near exits 4 and 5)
B2	Platform 1	← Bannan line towards Nangang Exhib Center / Kunyang (BL09 Jiangzicui)
B2	Island platform, doors will open on the left
B2	Platform 2	→ Bannan line towards Dingpu / Far Eastern Hospital (BL07 Banqiao) →

=== Exits ===
- Exit 1: Intersection of Wenhua Rd. Sec. 1 and Minsheng Rd. Sec. 3, beside the Xinpu Market
- Exit 2: Intersection of Wenhua Rd. Sec. 1 and Minsheng Rd. Sec. 2, beside the Forward Hotel
- Exit 3: Intersection of Wenhua Rd. Sec. 2 and Minsheng Rd. 2, beside the King building towards Zhuangjing & Huajiang parks
- Exit 4: Intersection of Wenhua Rd. Sec. 2 and Minsheng Rd. Sec. 2
- Exit 5: Intersection of Wenhua Rd. Sec. 2 and Minsheng Rd. Sec. 3, beside the Far Eastern International Bank

== Around the station ==
- Chihlee University of Technology
- Banciao Weekend Flower Market
- New Taipei City Arts Center
- Xinpu Market
- New Taipei City Council (between this station and Jiangzicui station)
- New Taipei City Library
- Xinpu Elementary School
- Juguang Elementary School
- Jiangcui Junior High School
- Zhongshan Junior High School
- Siwei Park
- Zhuangjing Park
- Huajiang Park
- Provincial Highway No. 3
- Provincial Highway No. 64
