= Chihlee University of Technology =

University in New Taipei City, Taiwan

- 致理科技大學
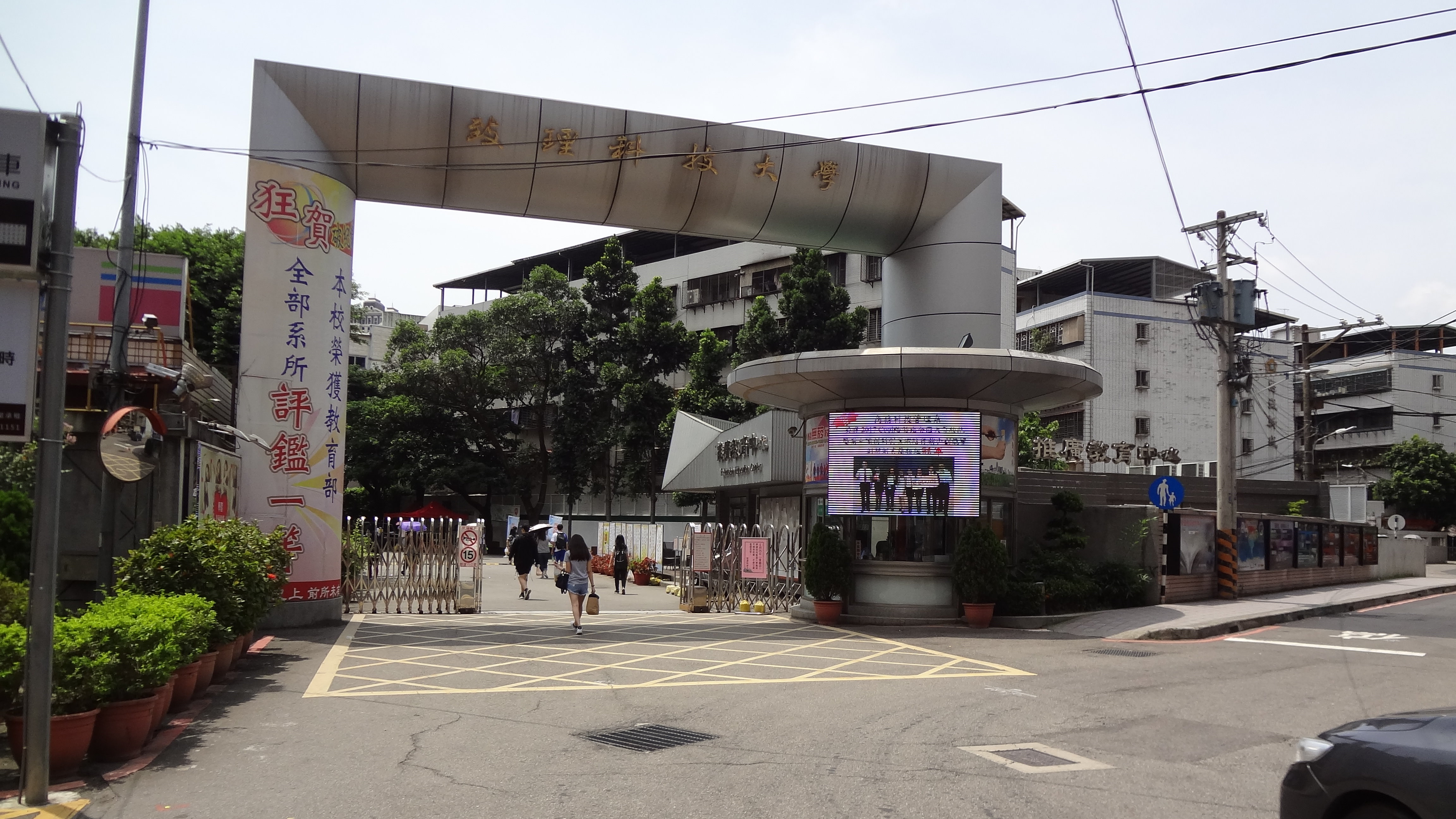
- Type: Private
- Established: 1965
- President: Chen, Ju Long
- Academic staff: Business Management Innovative Design Commercial Trade and Foreign Language
- Location: Banqiao, New Taipei City, Taiwan; 25°01′16.2″N 121°27′54.4″E
- Campus: Urban
- Colors: Gold, Blue, Red and White
- Website: www.chihlee.edu.tw
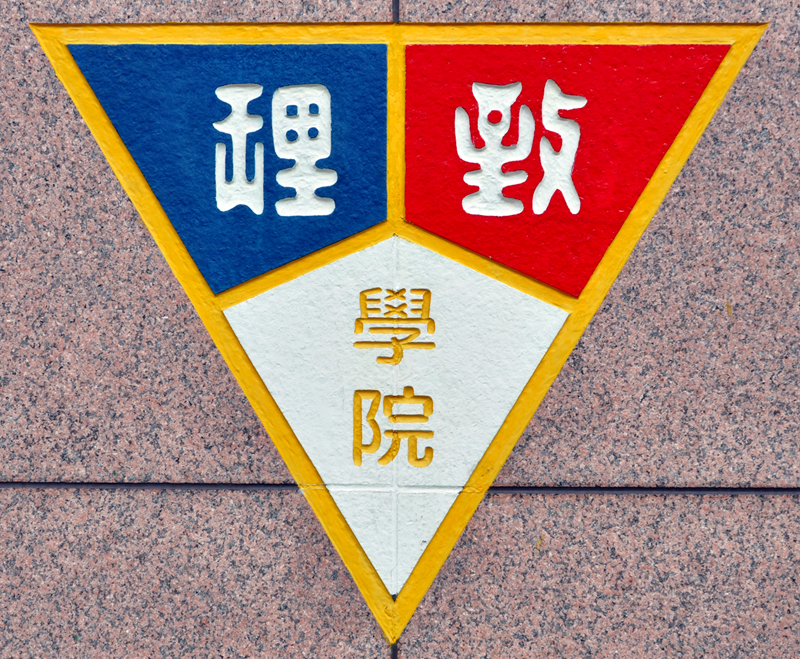

Chihlee University of Technology
- Traditional Chinese: 致理科技大學
Transcriptions
Standard Mandarin
- Hanyu Pinyin: Zhìlǐ kējì dàxué
Southern Min
- Hokkien POJ: Tì-lí Kho-ki Tāi-ha̍k

Chihlee University of Technology (CLUT; Chinese: 致理科技大學; Pe̍h-ōe-jī: Tì-lí Kho-ki Tāi-ha̍k), is a private university in Banqiao District, New Taipei City, Taiwan. Chihlee serves over 10,000 full-time students. The word zhìlǐ describes a personal quality that may be rendered dedication. CLUT is accredited by ACCBE and affiliated with Customs Administration, Ministry of Finance, Importers and Exporters Association of Taipei (IEAT), Customs Broker Association of Kaohsiung, SAP University Alliances and Institute for Innovative Global Education (IIGE).

== History ==
The school was founded in 1965 in Banqiao as Chihlee College of Business, a trade school offering associate's degrees in fields related to commerce. The CLCB comprised four departments: International Trade, Business Administration, Accounting and Statistics, and Banking and Insurance. A Department of Secretarial Science was added three years later. The school was also known in English as the Chihlee Institute of Commerce.

In 2000 the school was upgraded by Taiwan's Ministry of Education to a full baccalaureate degree-granting institution named Chihlee University of Technology (( factually inaccurate / was still an "Institute" in 2008 / verify dates )). The curriculum and range of majors expanded and the school was renamed Chihlee Institute of Technology. In 2015 the school was officially upgraded by Taiwan's Ministry of Education to a university.

== Faculties ==
- College of Business Management
- College of Innovation and Design
- College of International Business and Foreign Language

== Transportation ==
The campus lies within walking distance of Xinpu Station of the Taipei Metro.

== See also ==
- List of universities in Taiwan
