= Ili Cheng =

Taiwanese actress (born 1993)

- 鄭家純
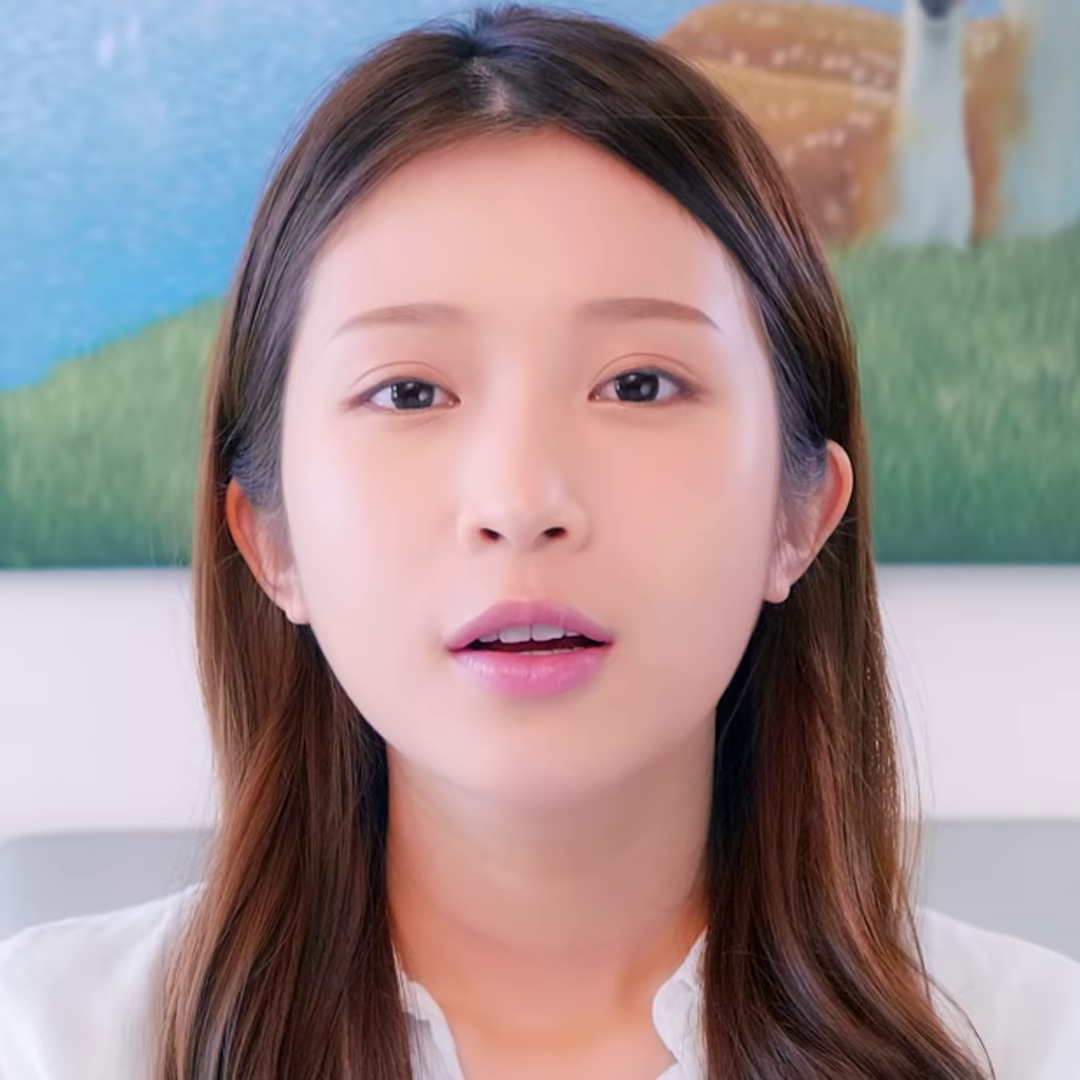
- Born: Cheng Chia-chen; 31 August 1993 (age 33); Banqiao (now Banqiao District, New Taipei City), Taipei County, Taiwan
- Other names: Jipai Mei (雞排妹); Yi Li (一粒); Zheng Meizhu (鄭美珠) (Note: Born Zheng Jiazhen, in 1999 renamed "Zheng Meizhu", later changed to "Zheng Jiachun" in 2013.)
- Citizenship: Taiwan
- Education: New Taipei City Baqiao District Puqian Elementary School; Kuang Jen Catholic High School Central China; Taipei Municipal Shilin High School of Commerce; Takming University of Science and Technology
- Occupations: Actress; model
- Years active: 2012–present
- Agent: (Shui Wu Yanyi) Star Rain International Limited
- Notable work: Shiba Sui De Liwu (photo album)
- Spouse: Akira (m. 2022)

Chinese name
- Traditional Chinese: 鄭家純
- Simplified Chinese: 郑家纯
Transcriptions
Standard Mandarin
- Hanyu Pinyin: Zhèng Jiāchún
Yue: Cantonese
- Jyutping: zeng^{6} gaa^{1}seon^{4}

Jipai Mei
- Traditional Chinese: 雞排妹
- Simplified Chinese: 鸡排妹
- Literal meaning: chicken cutlet girl
Transcriptions
Standard Mandarin
- Hanyu Pinyin: Jīpái Mèi
Yue: Cantonese
- Jyutping: gai^{1} paai^{4}mui^{6}

Birth name (Cheng Chia-chen)
- Traditional Chinese: 鄭佳甄
- Simplified Chinese: 郑佳甄
Transcriptions
Standard Mandarin
- Hanyu Pinyin: Zhèng Jiāzhēn
Yue: Cantonese
- Jyutping: zeng^{6} gaai^{1}jan^{1}

Ili Cheng (Chinese: 鄭家純; born Cheng Chia-chen, 鄭佳甄; 31 August 1993), nicknamed Jipai Mei (雞排妹; lit. 'chicken cutlet girl'), is a Taiwanese internet celebrity and model, who has appeared in television programmes, feature films, videos and a music EP. She came to fame in January 2012 when her promotional video for a fried chicken cutlet restaurant went viral. Thereafter she became an internet celebrity.

== Early life ==
Her parents divorced when she was seven. Her father, being much richer than her mother, gained custody of her and her younger brother, but they did not live with their father. Instead, they lived together with his father's ex-wife and four older half-siblings on his father's side. Her mother died of stomach cancer when she was 17.

She changed her name to Cheng Chia-chun (鄭家純) in 2013.

== Career ==
She started working as a part-time model in mid-July 2011. In 2012, she was featured in a promotional video, which became viral, for a chicken cutlet shop.

== Political views ==
Ili Cheng made a video for Tsai Ing-wen's presidential campaign in 2020.

Cheng actively engages in political discussion covering a wide range of issues. She has been supporting anti-nuclear movement in Taiwan since 2013. She joined the Sunflower Student Movement in 2014. She supports Hong Kong democracy movements.

== Personal life ==
On 2 November 2022, Cheng married with a Japanese pediatrician named Akira.

== Works ==
=== Photo albums ===
- 15 August 2012 18 Sui De Liwu ISBN 9789868003583 (in Chinese)
- 26 February 2013 The gift of 18th–Lili Shashin-shū ISBN 9784845844036 (in Japanese)
- 22 July 2015 Wo Shi Zheng Jiachun

=== Japanese photo DVD ===
- 16 November 2012 Ili The First, First! Ili (DVD)
- 26 April 2013 Ili "Yakusoku..." (DVD)
- 26 April 2013 Ili "Yakusoku..." (Blu-ray 3D)
- 26 July 2013 I'm iLi (DVD)
- 26 July 2013 I'm iLi (Blu-ray)

=== Films ===
- 2013 Campus Confidential as Wu Yifen
- 2015 One Night in Taipei as Hong Dou
- 2016 True Love is Ghost

=== Dramas ===
Date	Title	Network	Role	Notes
27 Nov 2012	Lady Maid Maid	SET	Candy	
14 Feb 2014	Guanghuan Zhihou	Le.com	Wen Wen	Internet drama
29 Sep 2015	Ling Yi Zhentan She	YouTube	A Chun	Internet drama

=== Dubbing ===
Date	Title	Network	Role	Ref.
19 Apr 2014	The Simpsons Season 24 Episode 20 "The Fabulous Faker Boy"	Fox (HD)	Chicken teacher	

=== Music videos ===
- November 2012: Forgive Me - Fir A Qin Real
- December 2013: Wo Bu Dong Ai - Ryan

=== Records ===
Album	Tracks
Ai Shi Shenma EP: Record company: Heguang Entertainment; Issue date: 2014; Language: Mandarin	#Ai Shi Shenma: 1. Mao Cao; 2. Chang Jimo De Ge
