= Jiangzicui metro station =

Metro station in New Taipei, Taiwan

Jiangzicui 江子翠
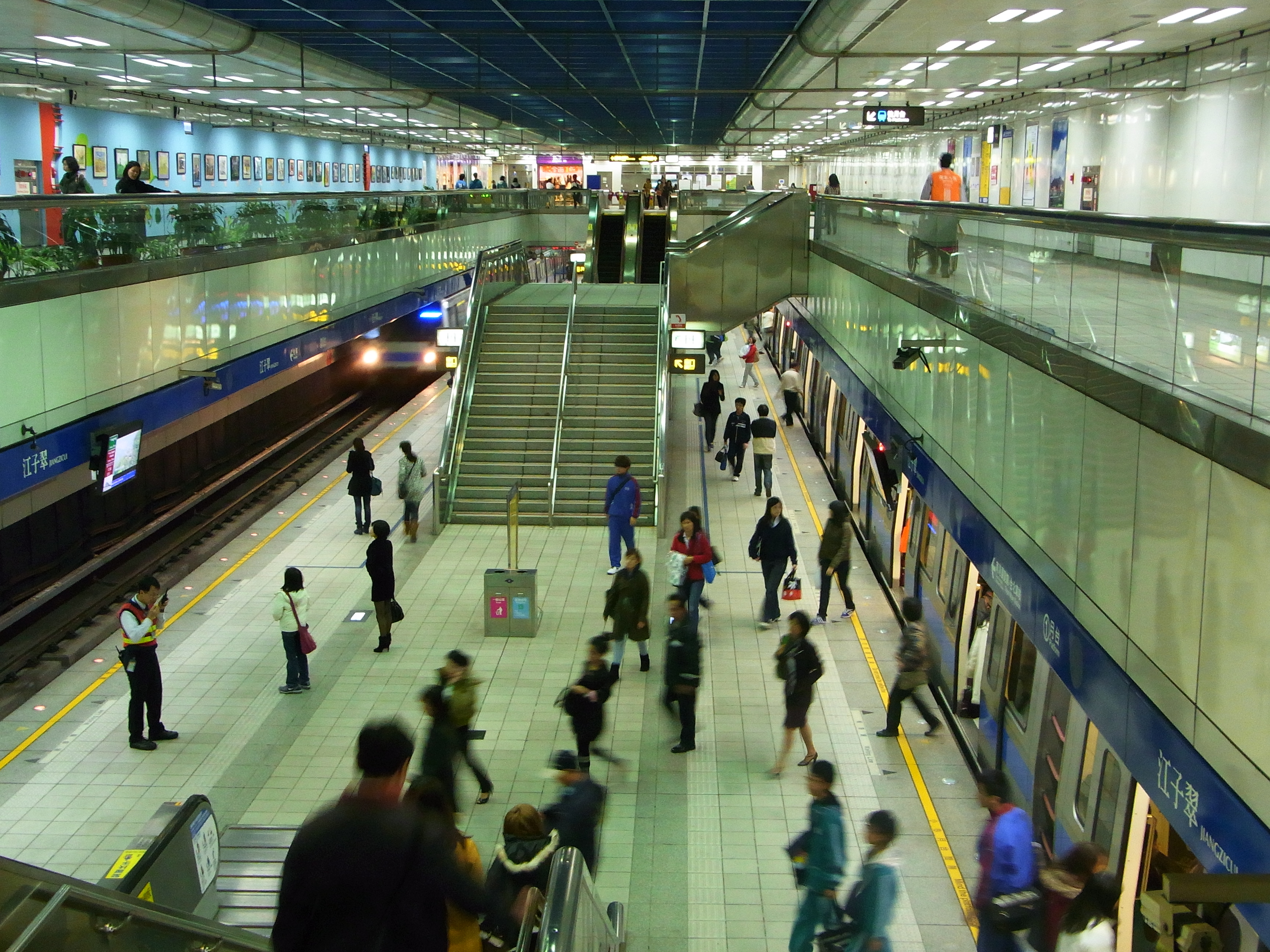
- Platform

Chinese name
- Chinese: 江子翠
Transcriptions
Standard Mandarin
- Hanyu Pinyin: Jiāngzǐcuì
- Bopomofo: ㄐㄧㄤ ㄗˇ ㄘㄨㄟˋ
- Wade–Giles: Chiang¹-tzu³ Ts'ui⁴
Hakka
- Pha̍k-fa-sṳ: Kông-chṳ́-chhùi
Southern Min
- Tâi-lô: Káng-á-tshuì

General information
- Location: B1F 296 Sec 2 Wenhua Rd; Banqiao District, New Taipei; Taiwan
- Coordinates: 25.0300°N 121.4724°E
- System: Taipei metro station

Construction
- Structure type: Underground
- Cycle facilities: Access available

Other information
- Station code: BL09
- Website: web.metro.taipei/e/stationdetail2010.asp?ID=BL09-084

History
- Opened: 2000-08-31

Passengers
- 2017: 17.820 million per year ▲0.66%
- Rank: (Ranked 26 of 119)

Services
Preceding station	Taipei Metro	Following station
Xinpu towards Dingpu	Bannan line	Longshan Temple towards Nangang Exhib Center
Location

Jiangzicui (Chinese: 江子翠, formerly transliterated as Chiangtzu Tsui Station until 2003) is a metro station in New Taipei, Taiwan served by Taipei Metro. It is a station on Bannan line. This is the last station in New Taipei when heading towards Taipei Nangang Exhibition Center on the line.

== Station overview ==
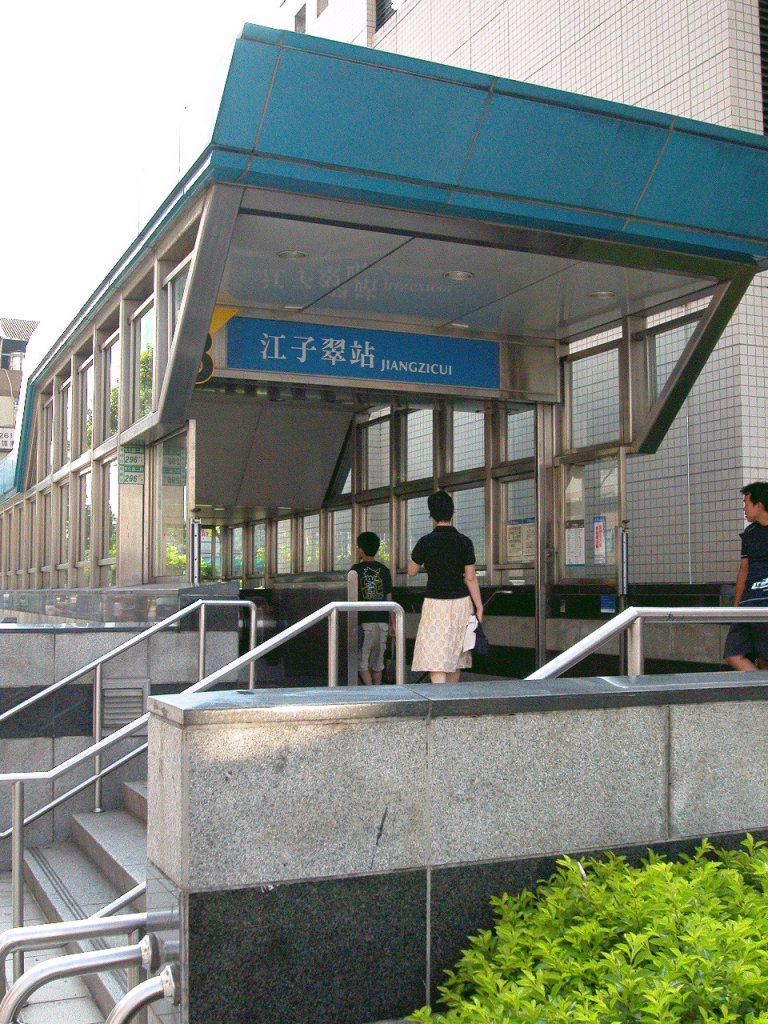
Jiangzicui station exit 3

This two-level, underground station has an island platform and six exits. It is located at the intersection of Wenhua Road and Shuangshi Road.

The station is not in the same location as the Japanese era station (Gangzui Station), which was located at the intersection of Xianmin Boulevard and Sanmin Road and has since been demolished.

Originally, this station was supposed to be called Shuangshi Station (雙十站), but this was later changed to its current name in reference to a tributary of the Dahan River which the Banqiao Line passes under.

== Station layout ==
Street level	Entrance/exit	Entrance/exit
B1	Concourse	Lobby, automatic ticket dispensing machine, information desk, one-way faregates Restrooms (south side, outside fare zone near exits 2 and 3)
B2	Platform 1	← Bannan line toward Nangang Exhib Center / Kunyang (BL10 Longshan Temple)
B2	Island platform, doors will open on the left
B2	Platform 2	→ Bannan line toward Dingpu / Far Eastern Hospital (BL08 Xinpu) →

=== Exits ===
- Exit 1: Intersection of Wenhua Rd. Sec. 2 and Shuangshi Rd. Sec. 3
- Exit 2: Intersection of Wenhua Rd. Sec. 2 and Shuangshi Rd. Sec. 3
- Exit 3: Intersection of Wenhua Rd. Sec. 2 and Shuangshi Rd. Sec. 2
- Exit 4: Intersection of Wenhua Rd. Sec. 2 and Shuangshi Rd. Sec. 2
- Exit 5: Near the intersection of Wenhua Rd. Sec. 2 and Renhua St.
- Exit 6: Lane 383, Wenhua Rd. Sec. 2 (towards Banqiao)

== Incidents ==
On 21 May 2014, at least 25 people were stabbed in a mass stabbing spree by a knife-wielding college student on the Taipei Metro Blue line. The attack occurred on a train near Jiangzicui Station, resulting in 4 dead and 24 injured. It was the first fatal attack on the metro system since it began operations in 1996. The suspect was 21-year-old university student Cheng Chieh (鄭捷).

== Around the station ==
- New Taipei City Council
- Stone Sculpture Park
- New Taipei City Public Library
- Banqiao Rural Community Park
- Jiangcui Elementary School
- Wensheng Elementary School
- Jiangcui Junior High School
- Huajiang Market
