= Banqiao District =

District in New Taipei, Taiwan

Banqiao 板橋區 Itahashi, Banciao, Pan-ch'iao
- District
- Banqiao District
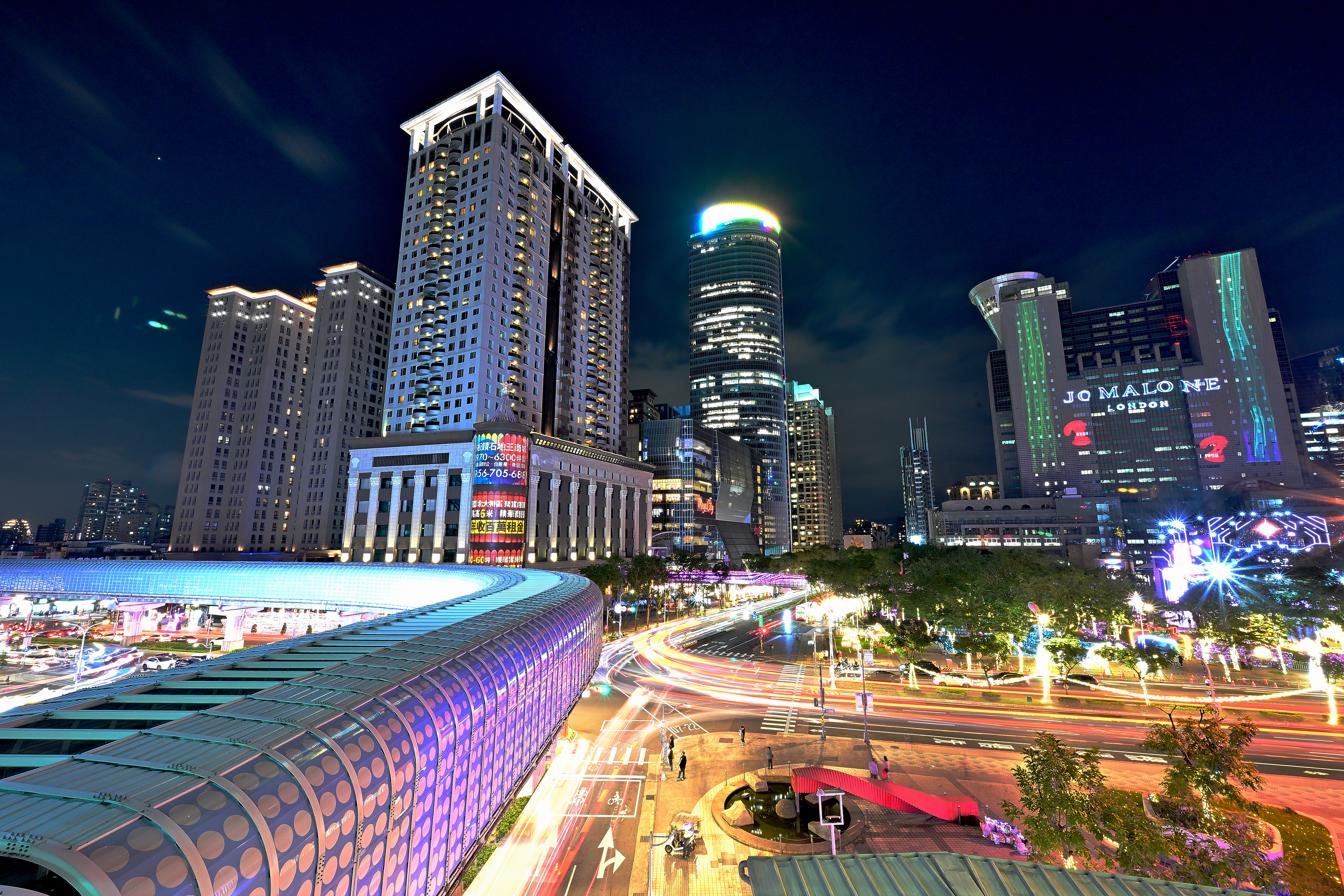

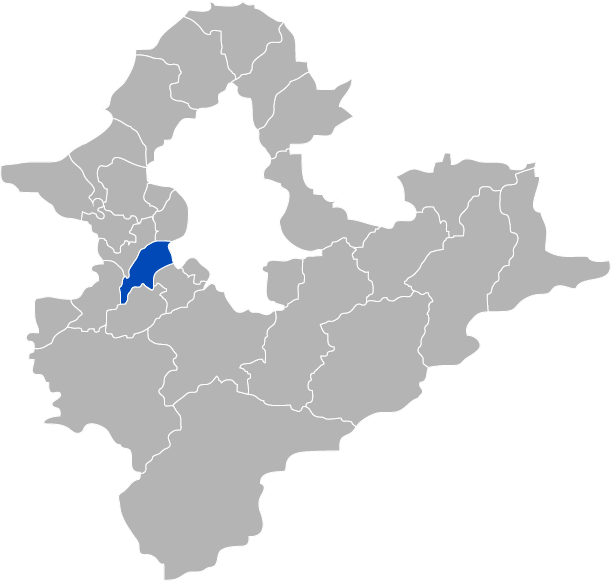
- Banqiao District in New Taipei City
- Coordinates: 25°00′40″N 121°26′45″E
- Country: Republic of China (Taiwan)
- Special municipality: New Taipei City
- Established: 1846

Area
  - Total: 23.1368 km^{2} (8.9332 sq mi)

Population (February 2023)
  - Total: 551,221
  - Density: 23,824.4/km^{2} (61,705.0/sq mi)
- Time zone: UTC+8 (CST)
- ZIP code: 220
- Area code: 02
- Website: www.banqiao.ntpc.gov.tw (in Chinese)

Chinese name
- Traditional Chinese: 板橋區
Transcriptions
Standard Mandarin
- Hanyu Pinyin: Bǎnqiáo Qū
- Wade–Giles: Pan^{3}-ch'iao^{2} Ch'ü^{1}
- Tongyong Pinyin: Bǎnciáo Cyu
Southern Min
- Hokkien POJ: Pang-kiô-khu

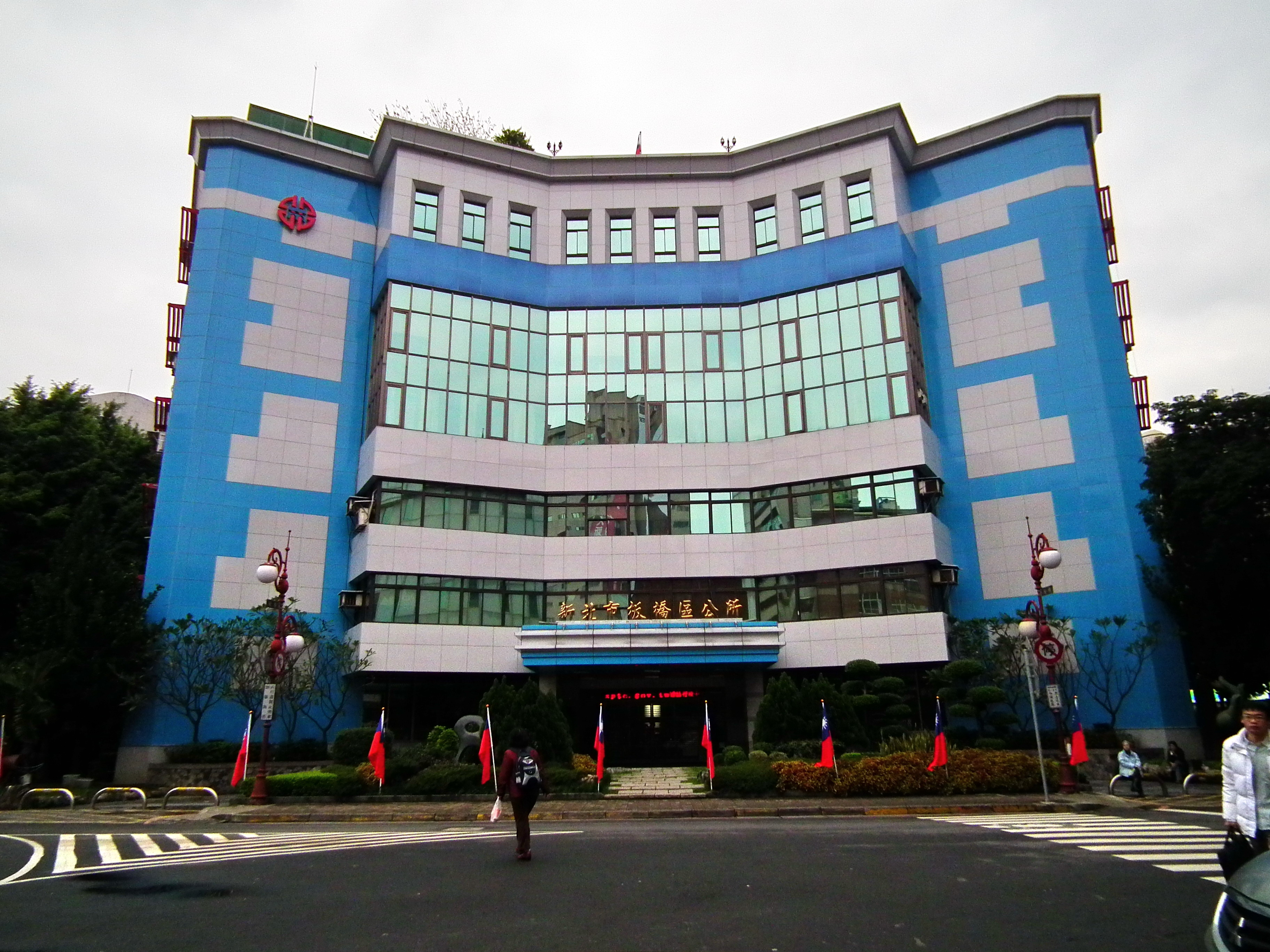
Banqiao District office

Banqiao District (Chinese: 板橋區; pinyin: Bǎnqiáo Qū) Banciao, Panchiao or Pan-ch'iao is a district and the seat of New Taipei City, Taiwan. It has the third-highest population density in Taiwan, with over 24,000/km^{2} (62,000/sq mi). Until the creation of New Taipei City, Banqiao was an incorporated county-administered city and the former seat of Taipei County.

== Name origin ==
The district's old name was Pang-kio (Chinese: 枋橋; pinyin: Fāngqiáo; Pe̍h-ōe-jī: Pang-kiô; lit. 'timbered bridge'), which dates back to the Qing Dynasty during the reign of the Qianlong Emperor (1735–1796 AD); thus derived Hokkien-based spellings Pankyu, Pankio, and Pankyo were common in English before 1945. A wooden bridge, locally called Pang-kiô-thâu (枋橋頭), was built for pedestrians to cross a brook located in the west of today's Banqiao, the modern day Nanzih Creek (湳仔溝).

In 1920, the Japanese government modified the name to Itahashi (板橋; "planked bridge"). The same characters are still used today, but are read Bǎnqiáo in Mandarin. However, in Taiwanese Hokkien, the old name Pang-kiô is still the norm.

== History ==
In the early 20th century, Pankyo (Pankyu) was a walled city and said to be owned by a landlord who had lived there "in feudal style", surrounded by armed retainers.

From 1920 to 1945, during Japanese rule, the area was administrated as Itahashi Town (板橋街), Kaizan District, Taihoku Prefecture.

Banqiao was upgraded from an urban township to a county-administered city as Pan-ch'iao or Banciao City of Taipei County on 1 July 1972. The city became Banqiao District on 25 December 2010.

== Geography ==
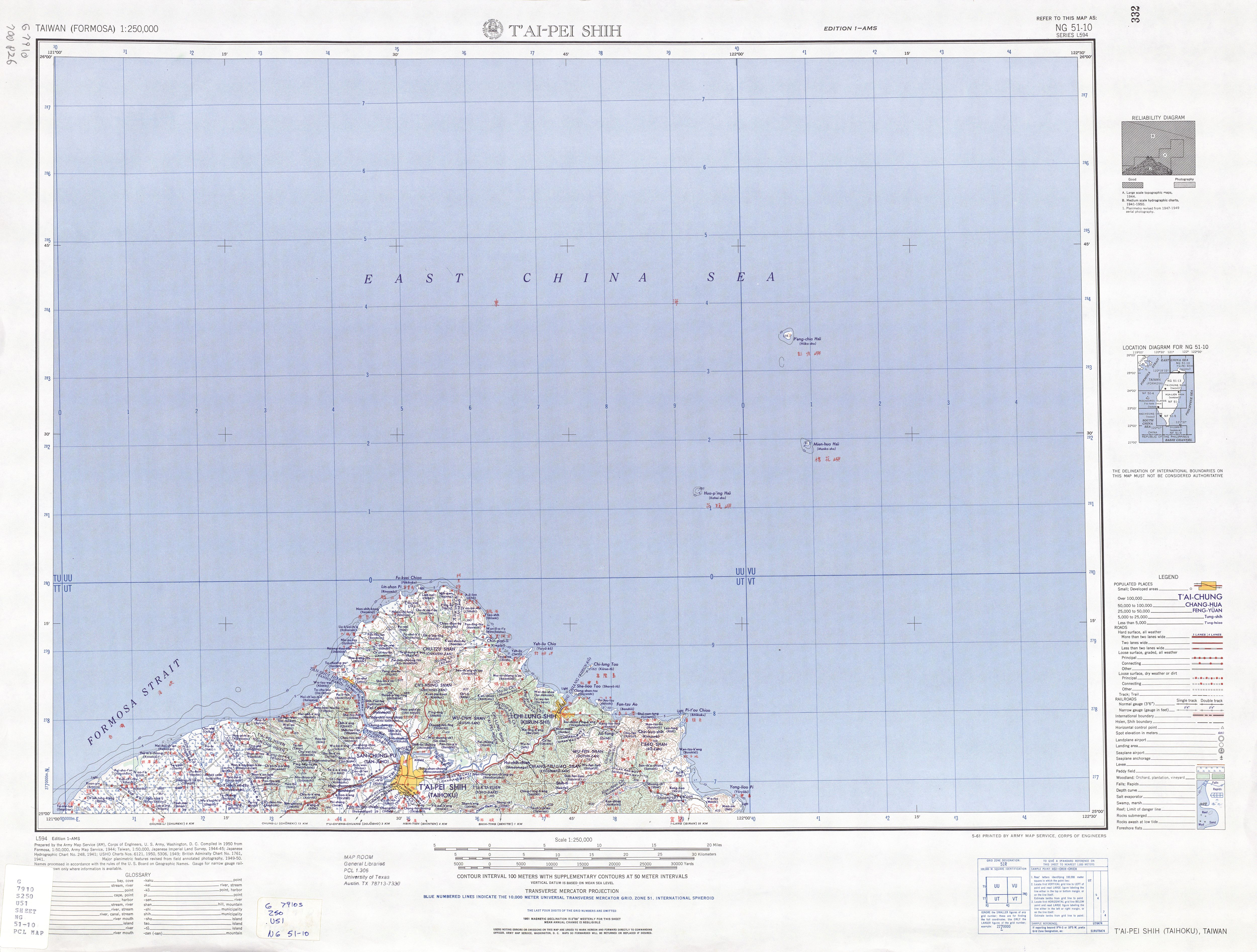
Map including Banqiao (labeled as Pan-ch’iao-chieh (Itahashigai) 板橋街) (1950)

Banqiao is located in the western part of the Taipei Basin of northern Taiwan, in the subtropical climate zone. Banqiao is surrounded by Taipei to the east, Sanchong to the north, Xinzhuang to the northwest, Shulin to the southwest, Tucheng to the south, and Zhonghe to the southeast. Banqiao is also bordered by two rivers: Xindian River to the northeast and Dahan River to the northwest.

== Economy ==
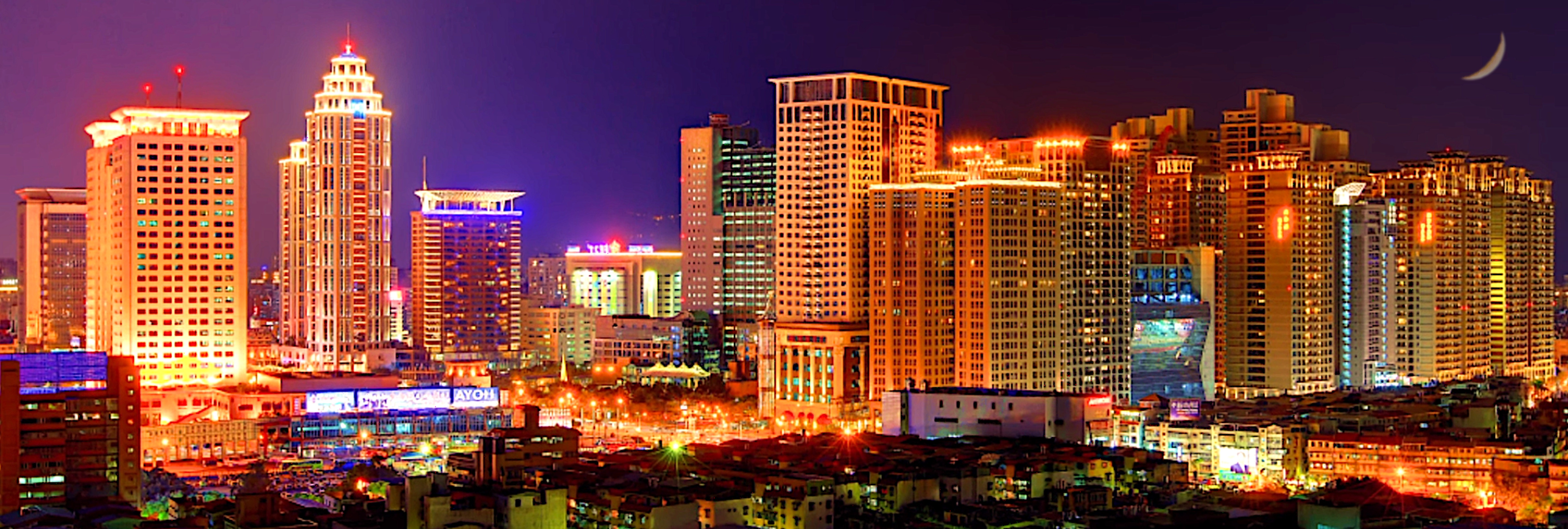
Skyline of downtown Banqiao District at night

Agriculture sector thrived in Banqiao in the 1950s. In the 1960s, manufacturing sector started to appear in the region and in the 1970s industries and commerce developed. In the 1980s and '90s, finance and commerce grew in the area.

== Education ==
Banqiao is home to several universities, including the National Taiwan University of Arts. The National Banqiao High School is considered one of the top high schools in New Taipei City.

=== Universities and colleges ===
- National Taiwan University of Arts
- Chihlee University of Technology
- Oriental Institute of Technology

=== High schools ===
- Banqiao Senior High School
- New Taipei Municipal Haishan High School (新北市立海山高級中學)
- National Overseas Chinese High School (國立華僑高級中學)
- Kuang Jen Catholic High School (天主教光仁高級中學)

== Tourist attractions ==
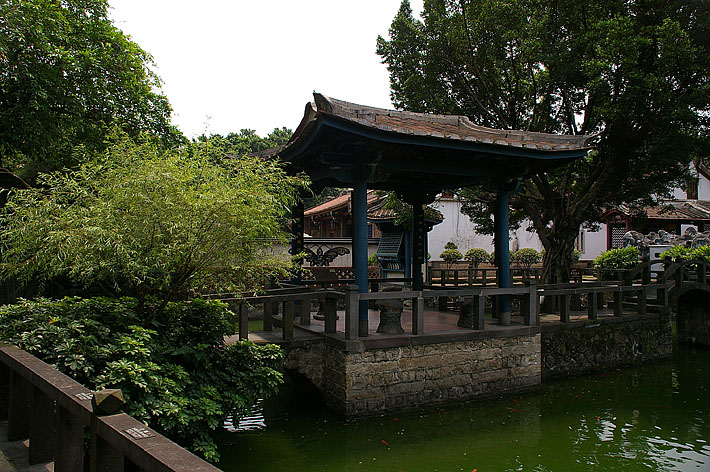
The Lin Family Mansion and Garden is a traditional garden in the district

- Banqiao 435 Art Zone
- Banqiao Agricultural Park
- Banqiao Stadium
- Cihui Temple
- Jieyun Temple
- Lin Family Mansion and Garden
- Nanya Night Market
- New Taipei City Main Public Library
- Paleo Wonders Mineral Fossil Museum
- Xinhai Constructed Wetland
- Stone Sculpture Park

== Sports facilities ==
Banqiao has several sports facilities including Banqiao Stadium. The annual New Taipei City sports game is hosted in the district.

== Transportation ==
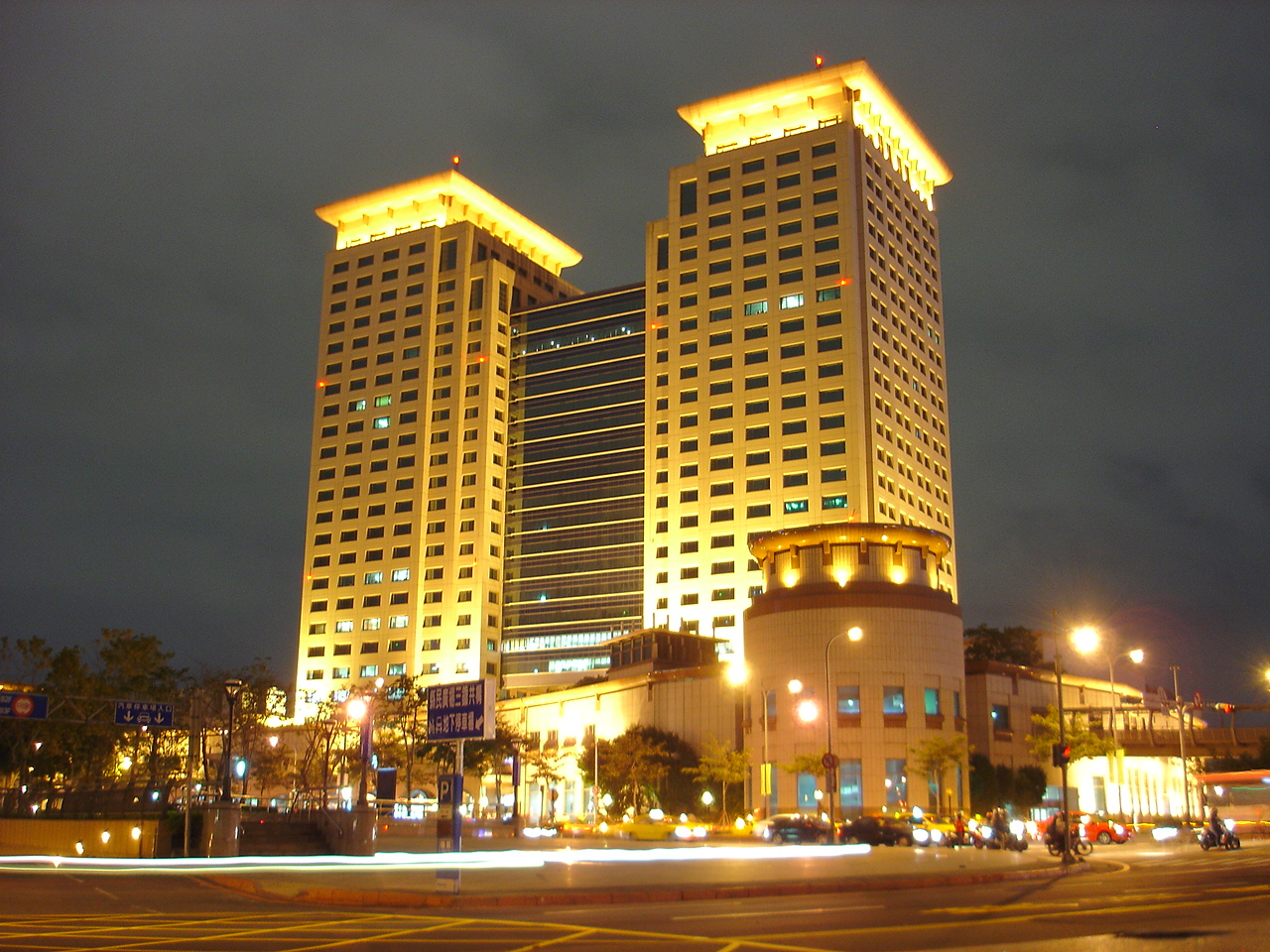
Banqiao station is served by high-speed rail, conventional rail, metro, and bus lines, making it a major transportation hub in New Taipei City.

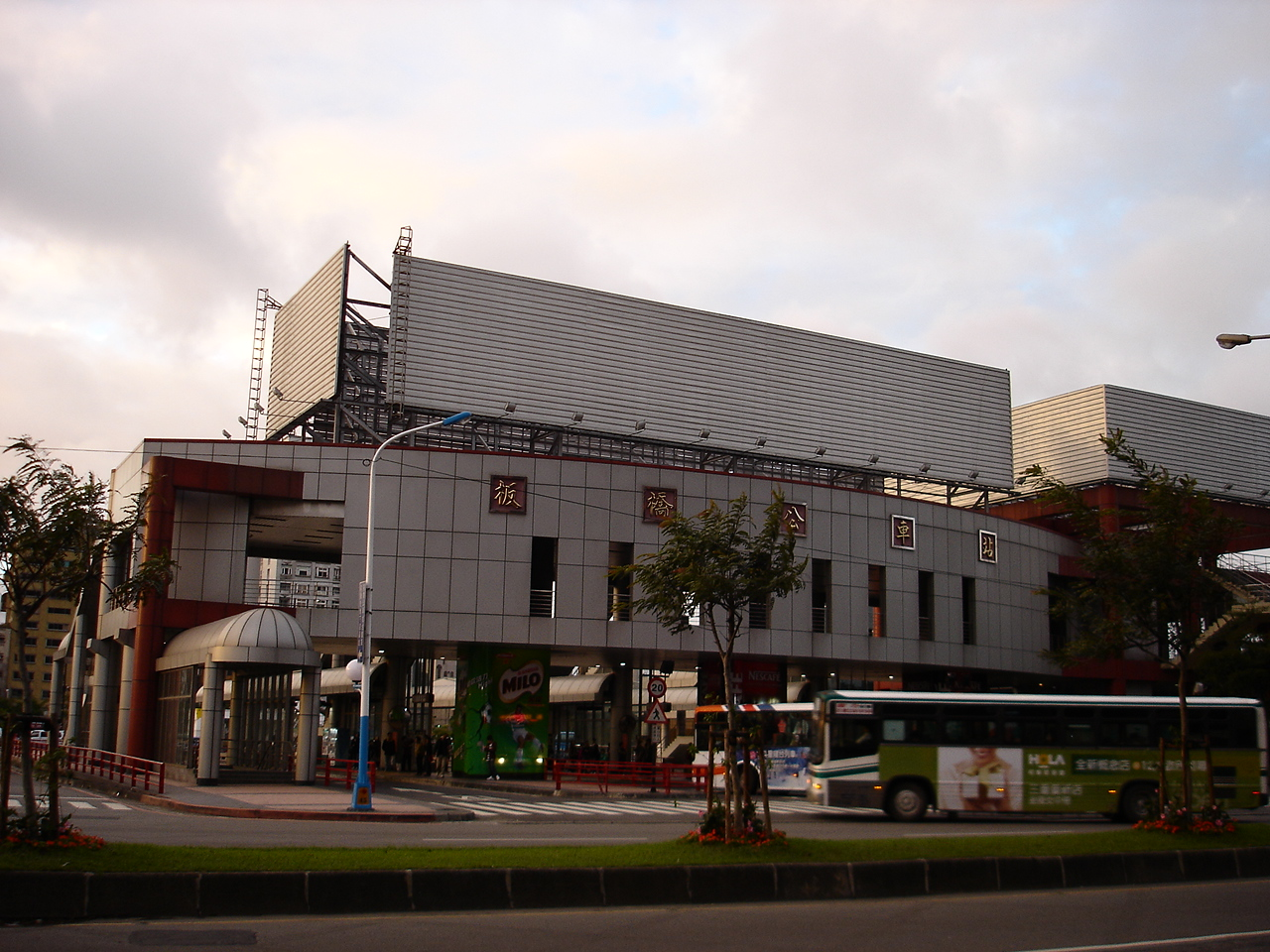
Banqiao bus station

Banqiao is well served by multiple public transportation services. Banqiao station is served by THSR bullet trains, conventional rail Taiwan Railway trains, and the Taipei Metro.

Since the beginning of 2020, the Circular line of the Taipei Metro also runs through the district. The Taipei Metro serves the district via the following stations:

- Far Eastern Hospital metro station
- Fuzhong metro station
- Xinpu metro station
- Jiangzicui metro station
- Banxin metro station
- Xinpu Minsheng metro station
- Banqiao station

Bus lines connect Banqiao with downtown Taipei and nearby districts.

Provincial Highway 3 and Provincial Highway 64 run through the district.

== Infrastructure ==
- Far Eastern Memorial Hospital

== Sister cities ==
- Addison, Texas, United States
- Cerritos, California, United States

== Notable residents ==
- Scott Chang - CEO of Lastertech
- Hsiao Chung-cheng, M.D. - Superintendent of Hsiao Chung-Cheng Hospital
- The Lin Ben Yuan Family

== Notable natives ==
- Hsiao Huang-chi, singer, songwriter and judoka
- Ili, artist
- Lin Fong-cheng, Minister of Transportation and Communication (1998-2000)
- Lin Hsiung-cheng, banker and philanthropist
- Liu Ping-wei, member of Legislative Yuan (1999–2002)
- Yang Ya-che, film and television director
