= Fuzhong metro station =

Metro station in New Taipei, Taiwan

Fuzhong 府中
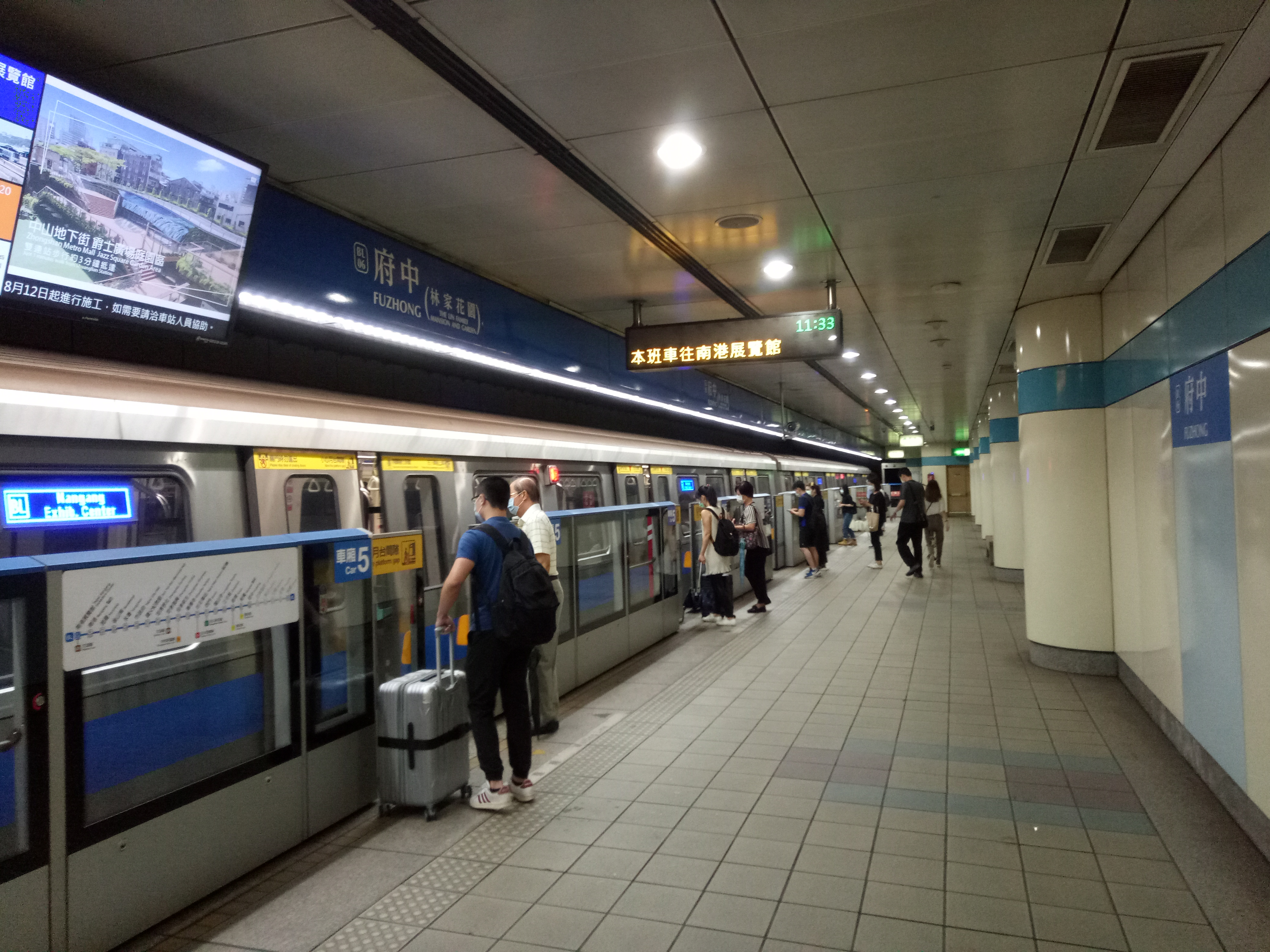
- Platform 1

Chinese name
- Chinese: 府中
Transcriptions
Standard Mandarin
- Hanyu Pinyin: Fǔzhōng
- Bopomofo: ㄈㄨˇ ㄓㄨㄥ
- Wade–Giles: Fu³-chung¹
Hakka
- Pha̍k-fa-sṳ: Fú-chûng
Southern Min
- Tâi-lô: Hú-tiong

General information
- Location: B1F 193 Sec 1 Xianmin Blvd; Banqiao District, New Taipei; Taiwan
- Coordinates: 25.0084°N 121.4594°E
- System: Taipei metro station

Construction
- Structure type: Underground
- Cycle facilities: Access available

Other information
- Station code: BL06
- Website: web.metro.taipei/e/stationdetail2010.asp?ID=BL06-081

History
- Opened: 2006-05-31

Passengers
- 2017: 20.610 million per year ▲1.62%
- Rank: (Ranked 17 of 119)

Services
Preceding station	Taipei Metro	Following station
Far Eastern Hospital towards Dingpu	Bannan line	Banqiao towards Nangang Exhib Center
Far Eastern Hospital Terminus	Bannan line	Banqiao towards Nangang Exhib Center
Location

Fuzhong (Chinese: 府中) is a metro station in New Taipei, Taiwan served by the Taipei Metro. It is a station on the Bannan line.

== Station overview ==
This five-level, underground station has two stacked side platforms and three exits. Its location is where the old TRA Banqiao Station used to reside.

== Design ==
The piece "Poetry on the Move" is an interactive bulletin board. It consists of a computer-operated LED matrix display in the form of a triangulated strip. The project invites participants to upload text messages and post poetry for public display.

== Station layout ==
Street level	Exit	Exits to Fuzhong Road
B2	Concourse	Lobby, toilets, one-way ticket machine, information desk
B3	Platform 1	← Bannan line toward Nangang Exhib Center / Kunyang (BL07 Banqiao)
B3	Side platform, doors will open on the left
B5	Platform 2	→ Bannan line toward Dingpu / Far Eastern Hospital (BL05 Far Eastern Hospital) →
B5	Side platform, doors will open on the right

== Around the station ==
Historical sites

- Lin Family Mansion and Garden

Night markets

- Nanya Night Market
- Huangshi Market

Museums

- Fuzhong 15

Parks

- Jieshou Park

Shopping malls

- Eslite Bookstore Banqiao Store

Schools and government offices

- Banqiao Elementary School
- Banqiao High School
- Banqiao District Office
- Banqiao Farmer's Association

Banks

- Bank of Taiwan Banqiao Branch
- Taiwan Business Bank Banqiao Branch
