= Big City (shopping mall) =

Shopping mall in East, Hsinchu, Taiwan

- 遠東巨城購物中心

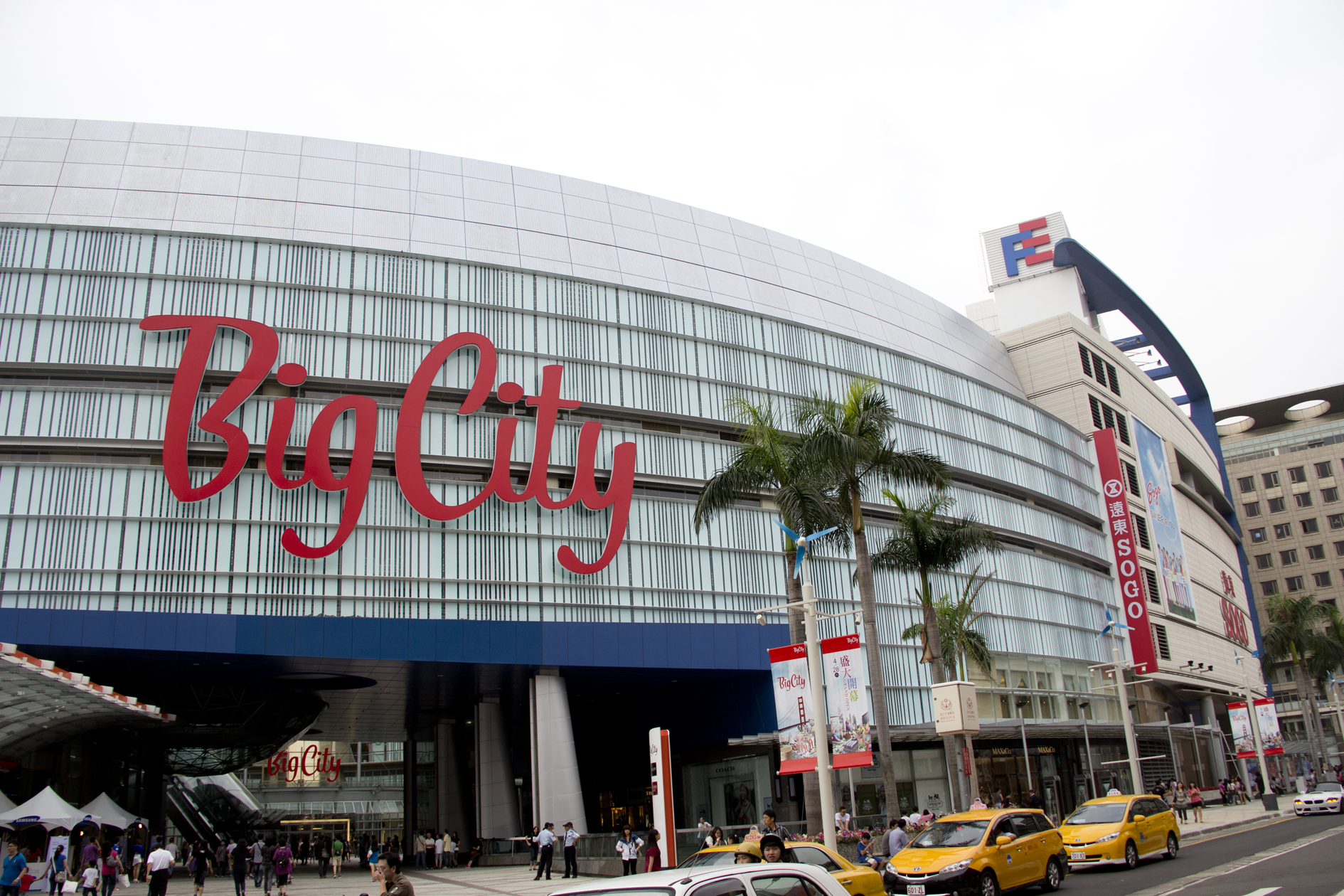
- Location: No. 229, Zhongyang Road, East District, Hsinchu, Taiwan
- Coordinates: 24°48′36″N 120°58′39″E
- Opened: April 28, 2012
- Developer: RTKL Associates
- Manager: Far Eastern Group
- Floor area: 340,000 m^{2} (3,700,000 sq ft)
- Floors: 12 floors above ground 5 floors below ground
- Parking: 3,000 parking spaces
- Website: www.febigcity.com/bigcity

Big City (Chinese: 遠東巨城購物中心) is a shopping mall in East District, Hsinchu, Taiwan that opened on April 28, 2012. It is owned and operated by Far Eastern Group. With a total floor area of 340,000 m^{2} (3,700,000 sq ft), it is the largest shopping center in Hsinchu City and Northern Taiwan. Since 2015, it has set a record of 10 billion NT$ of sales within three and a half years of operation, and has squeezed into Taiwan's top eight shopping malls in terms of sales revenue. In the first half of 2017, the number of Facebook check-ins was ranked second in Taiwan, with 2.5 million times second only to Taiwan Taoyuan International Airport. In 2019, its revenue reached NT$12.3 billion, making it the top 7 shopping malls in Taiwan in terms of sales revenue. Main core stores of the mall include Sogo, A.mart, citysuper, Daiso, Eslite Bookstore, H&M, Muji, Sisley, Starbucks, Vieshow Cinemas and various themed restaurants. In October 2021, the third authorized Lego store in Taiwan opened in the mall.

== Gallery ==
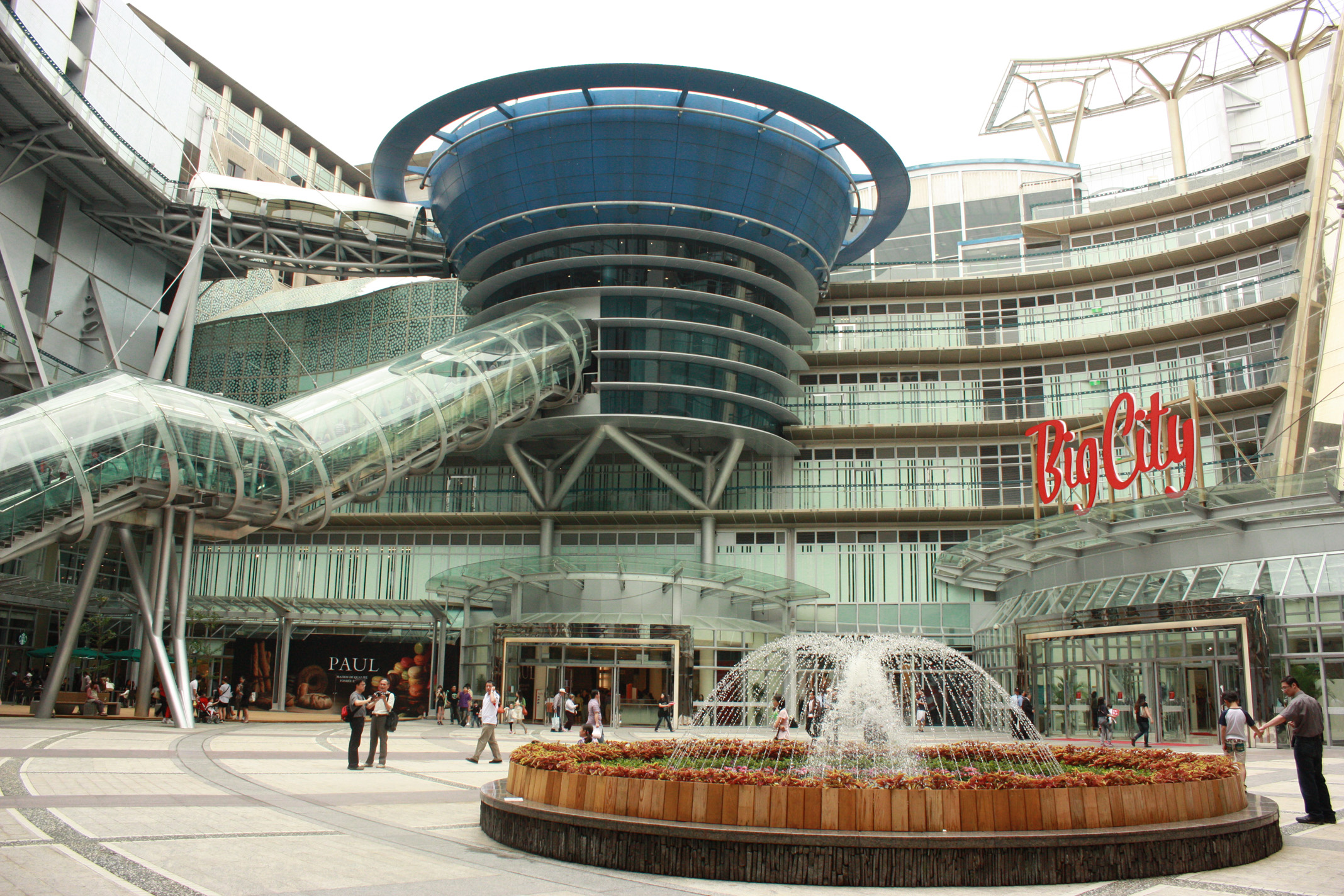
Exterior

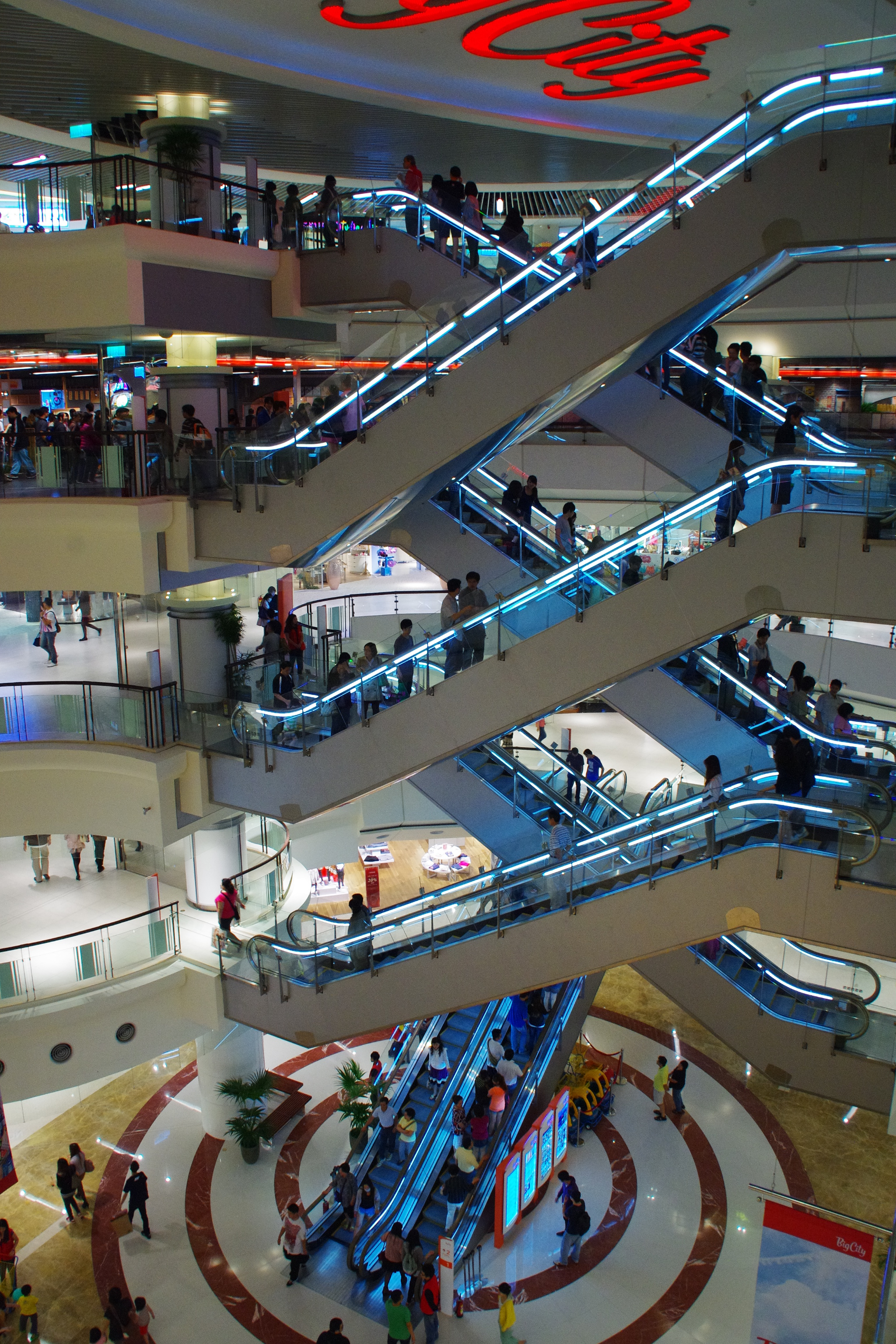
Escalators

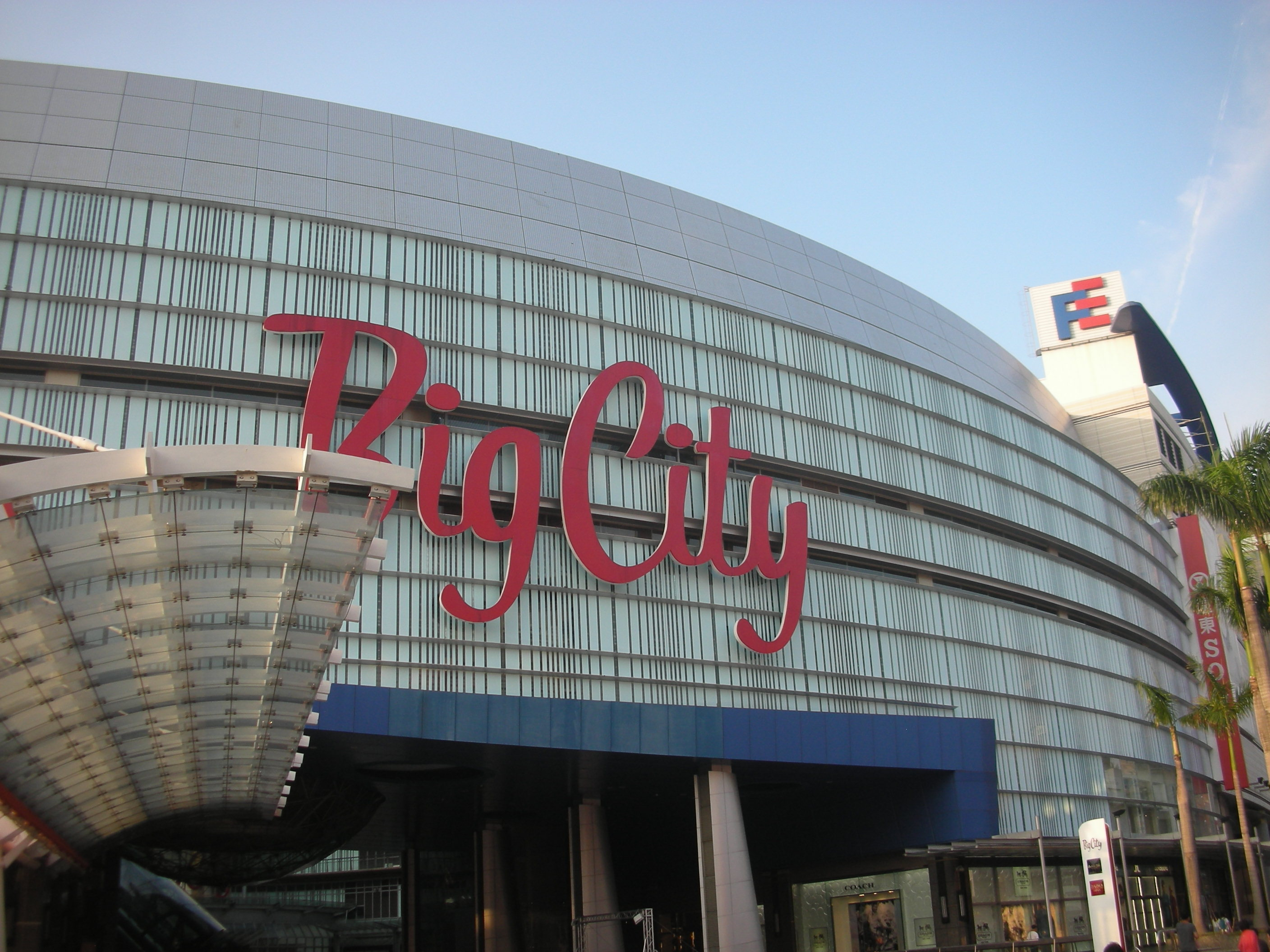
Entrance

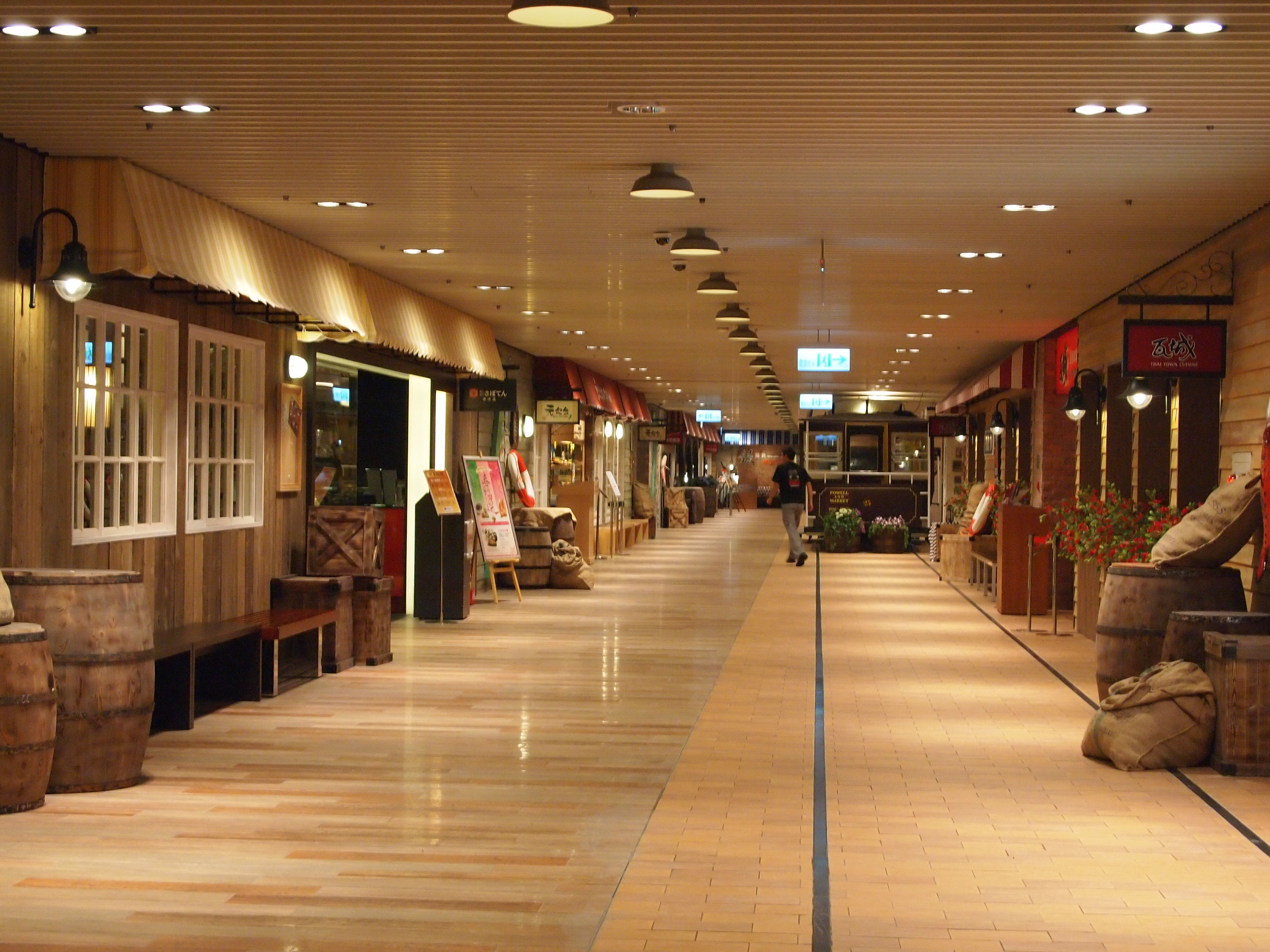
Interior

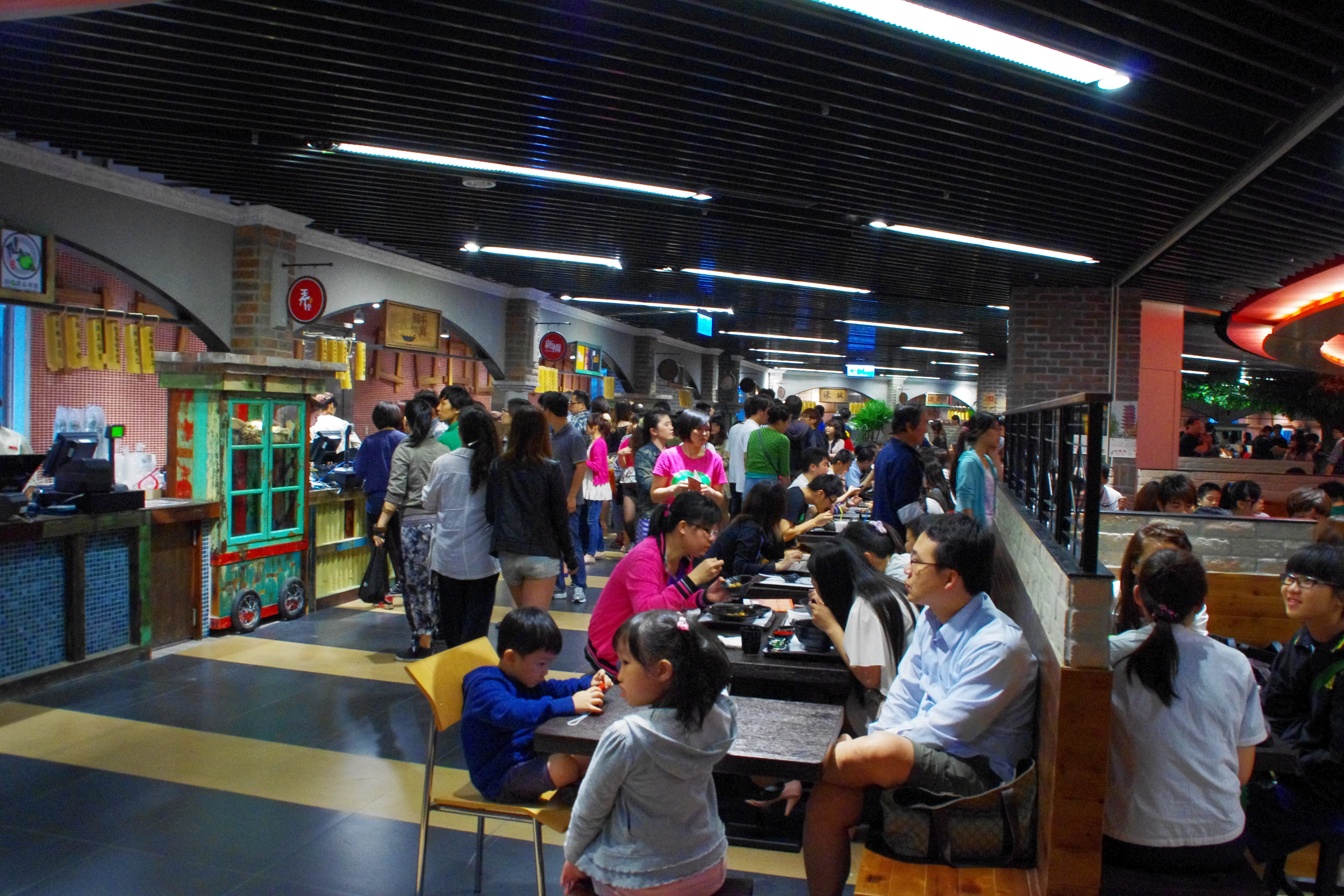
Food Court

== See also ==
- List of tourist attractions in Taiwan
- Mega City (shopping mall)
- Top City
- Taroko Square
