= Mega City (shopping mall) =

Shopping mall in Banqiao, New Taipei, Taiwan

- 板橋大遠百
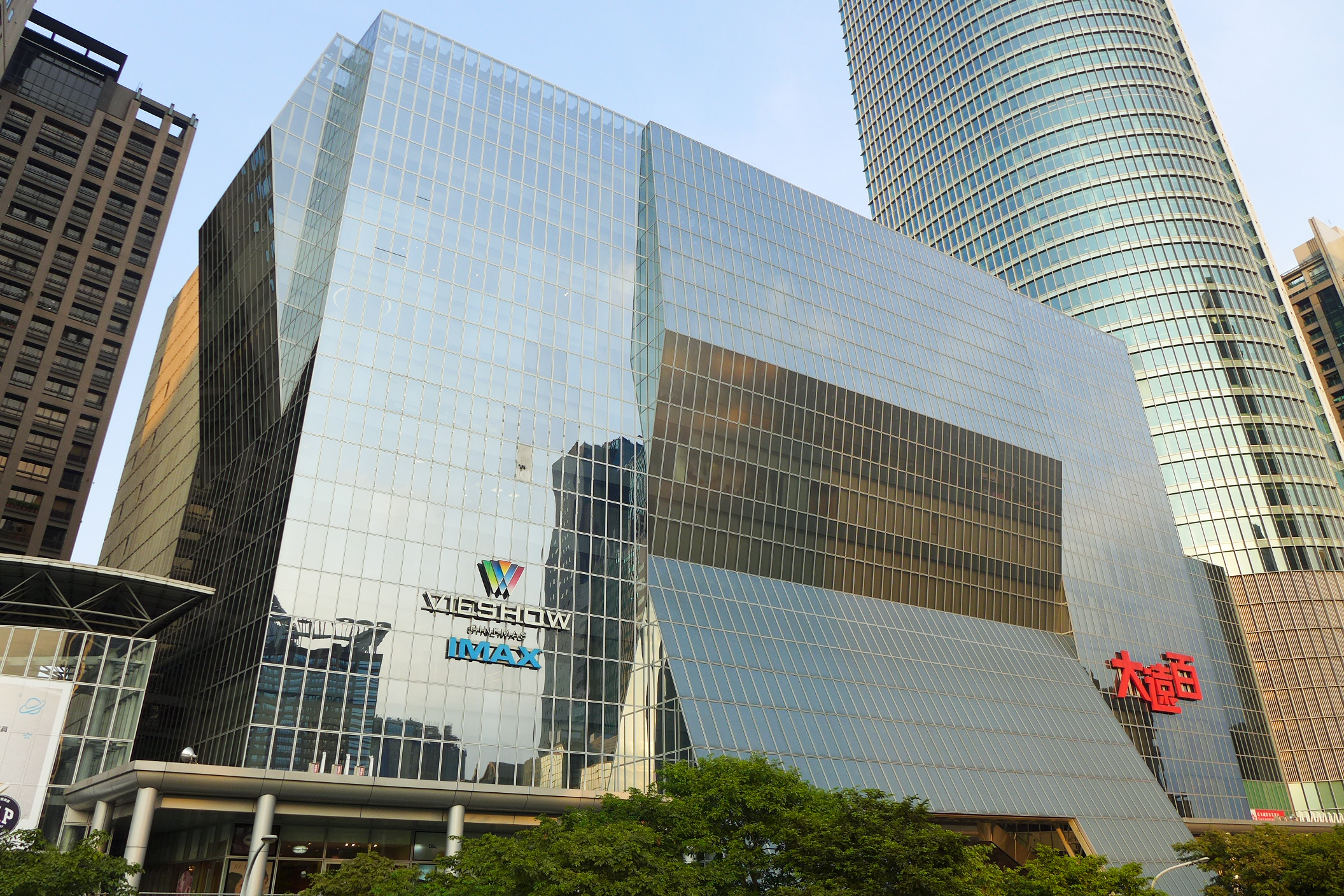
- Location: No. 28, Xinzhan Road, Banqiao District, New Taipei, Taiwan
- Coordinates: 25°0′46.7″N 121°28′1.3″E
- Opened: January 5, 2012
- Manager: Far Eastern Group
- Architect: Benoy and Kisho Kurokawa
- Floor area: 132,400 m^{2} (1,425,000 sq ft)
- Floors: 11 floors above ground 4 floors below ground
- Public transit: Banqiao station
- Website: https://www.feds.com.tw/en/54/OverSea

Mega City (Chinese: 板橋大遠百) is a shopping mall located in Xinban Special District of Banqiao District, New Taipei, Taiwan that opened on January 5, 2012. The mall is a part of a joint development complex along with Far Eastern Mega Tower and both are owned and operated by the Far Eastern Group. With a total floor area of 132,400 m^{2} (1,425,000 sq ft) and 11 floors above ground and 4 floors below ground, it is the largest shopping center in New Taipei when it opened. Jointly designed by Benoy and Kisho Kurokawa, the mall started construction in 2008. Main core stores of the mall include Vieshow Cinemas, citysuper, Uniqlo, Gap, Nike and various other high end brands and themed restaurants. In January 2022, the fourth authorized Lego store in Taiwan opened in the mall.

== Public Transportation ==
The mall is located in close proximity to Banqiao station, which is served by the Bannan line and Circular line of Taipei Metro as well as by Taiwan Railway and Taiwan High Speed Rail.

== Gallery ==
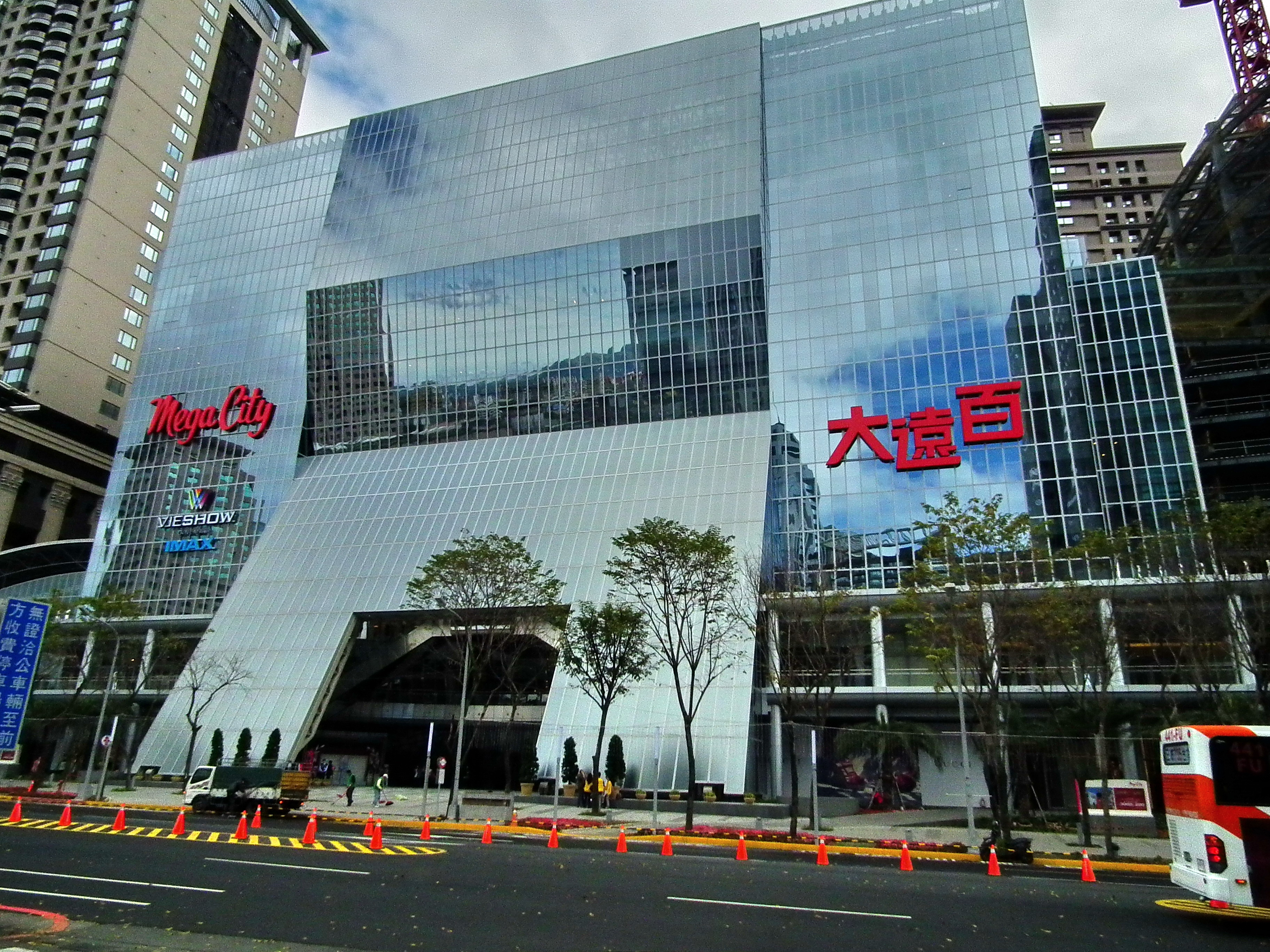
Exterior

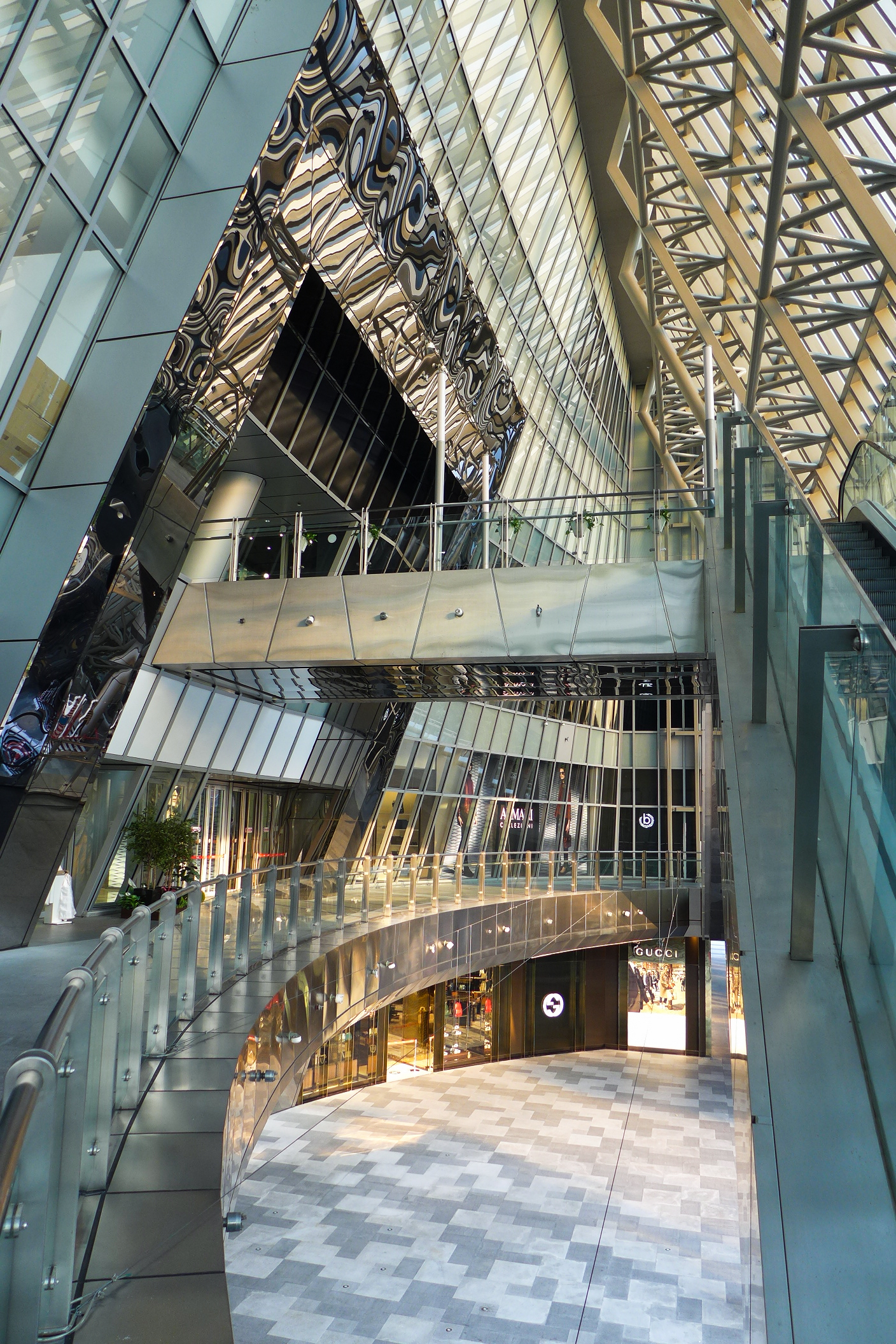
Entrance void

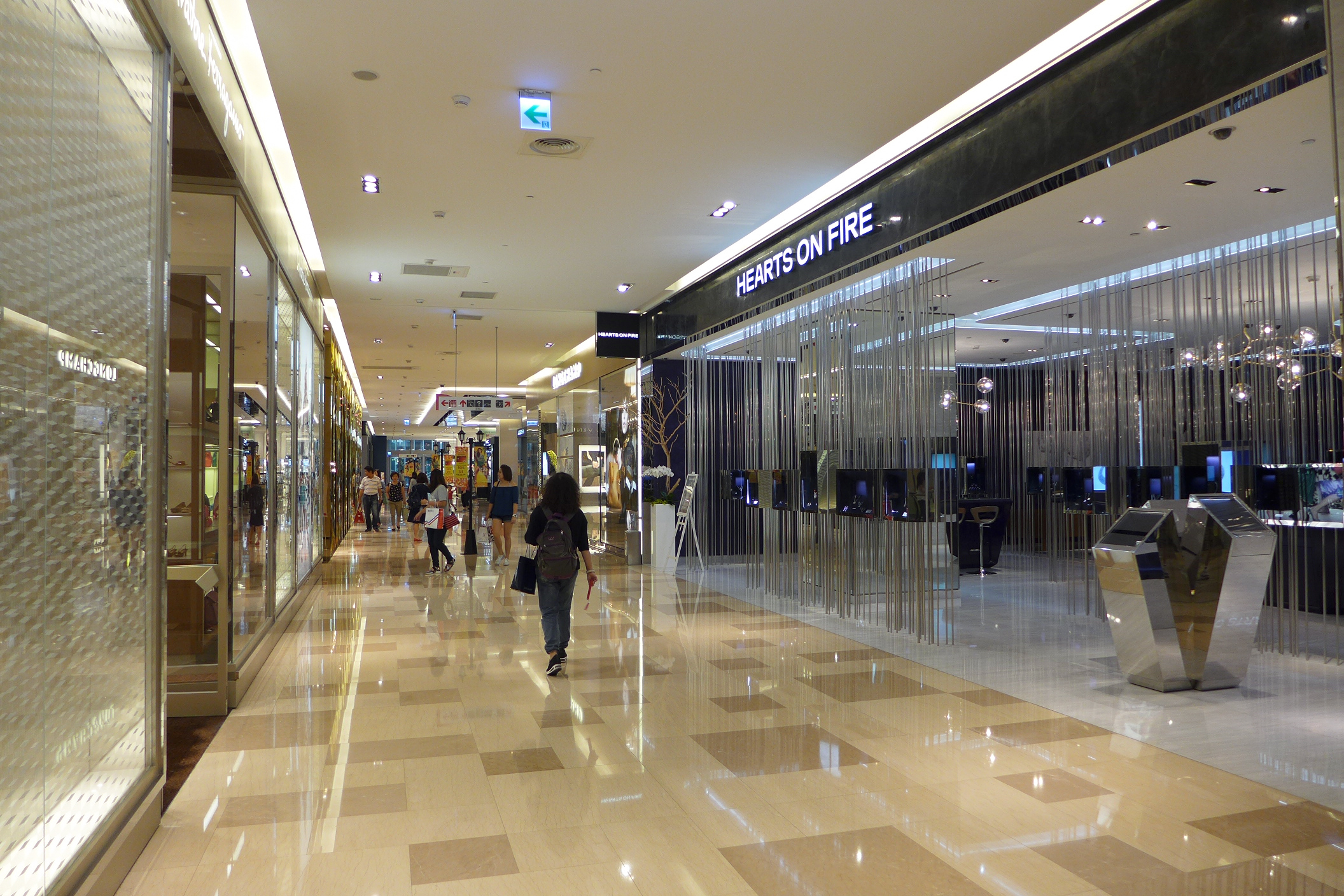
Level 1

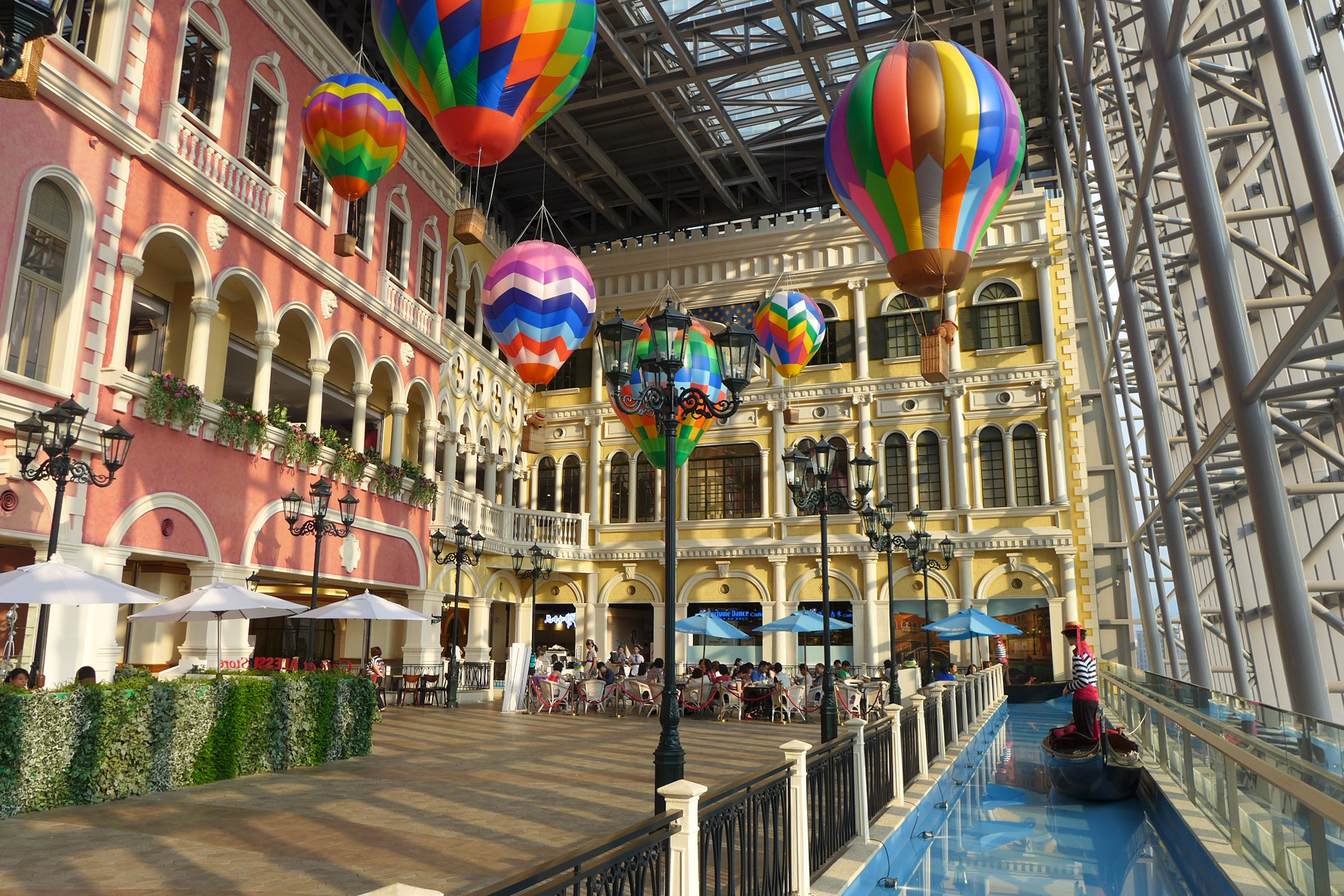
Interior

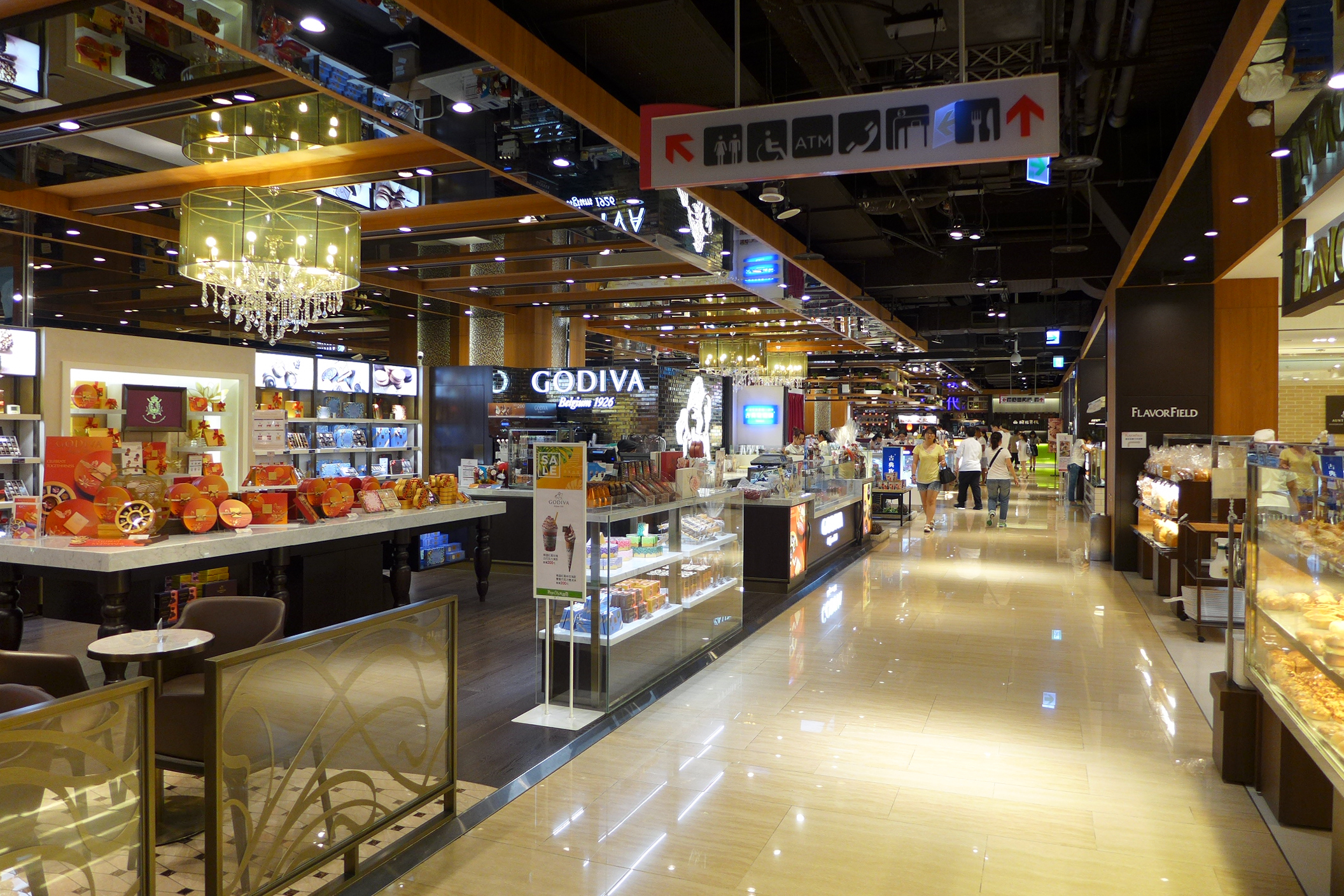
Level B1 Kiosk

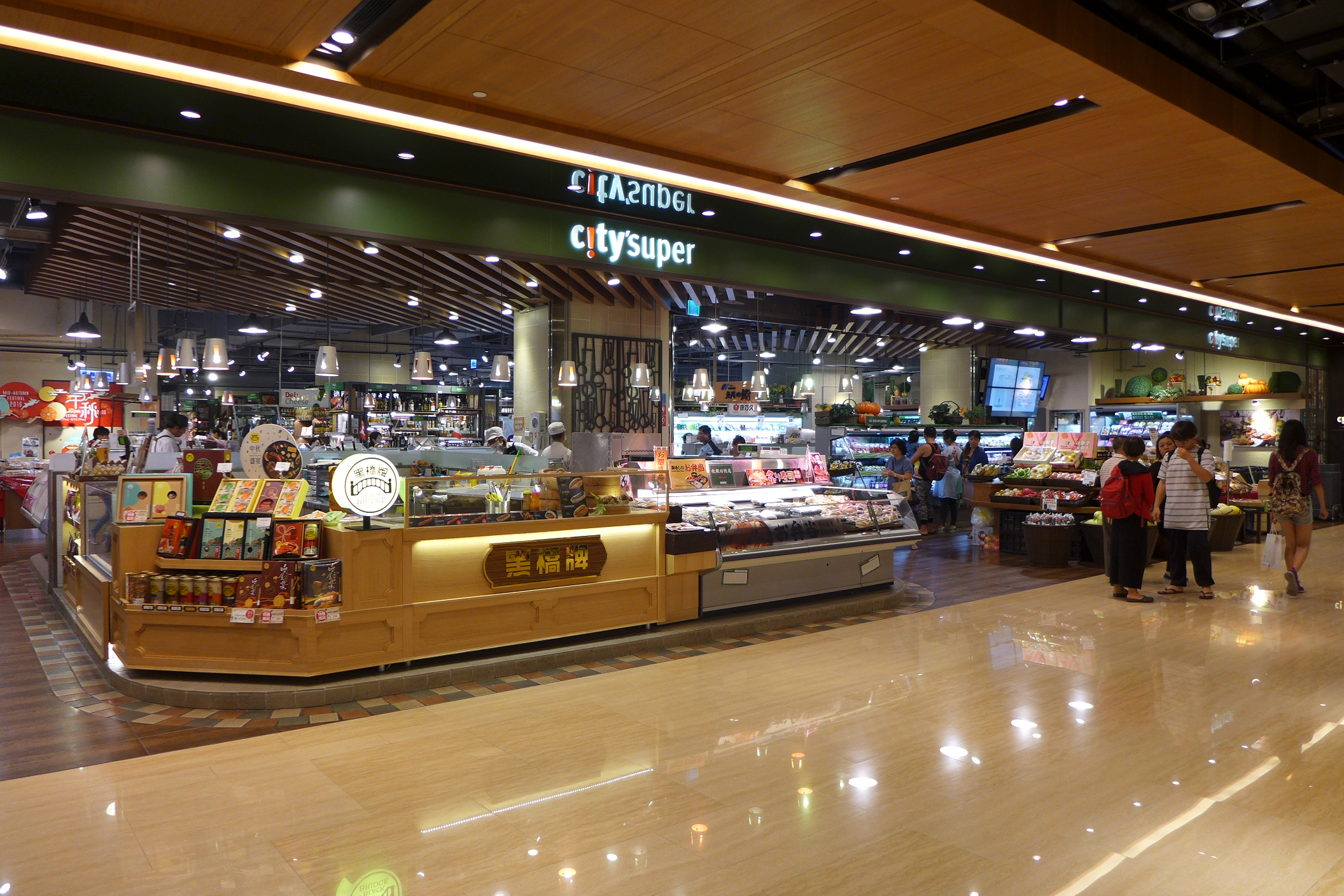
citysuper

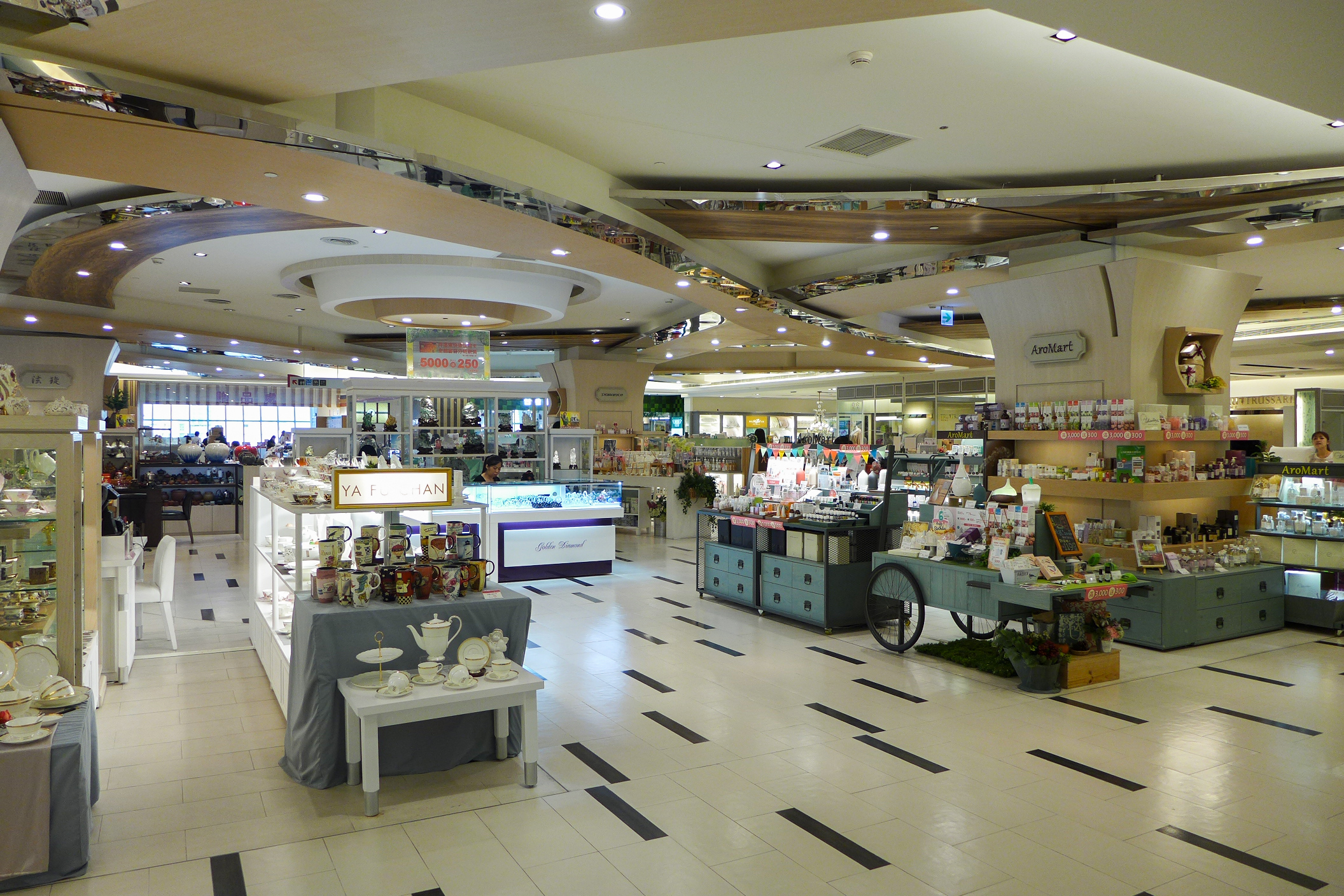
Level 7

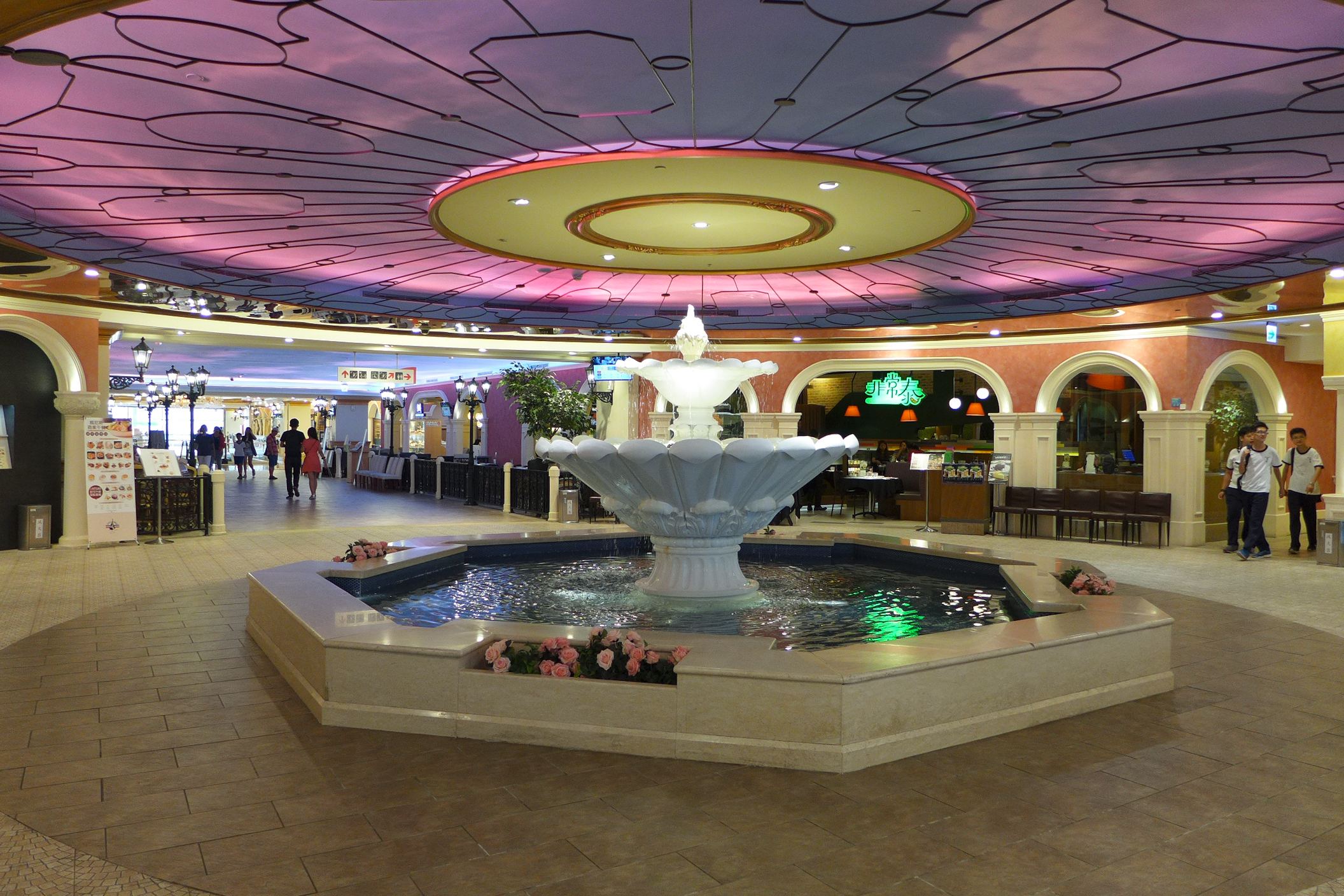
Level 9

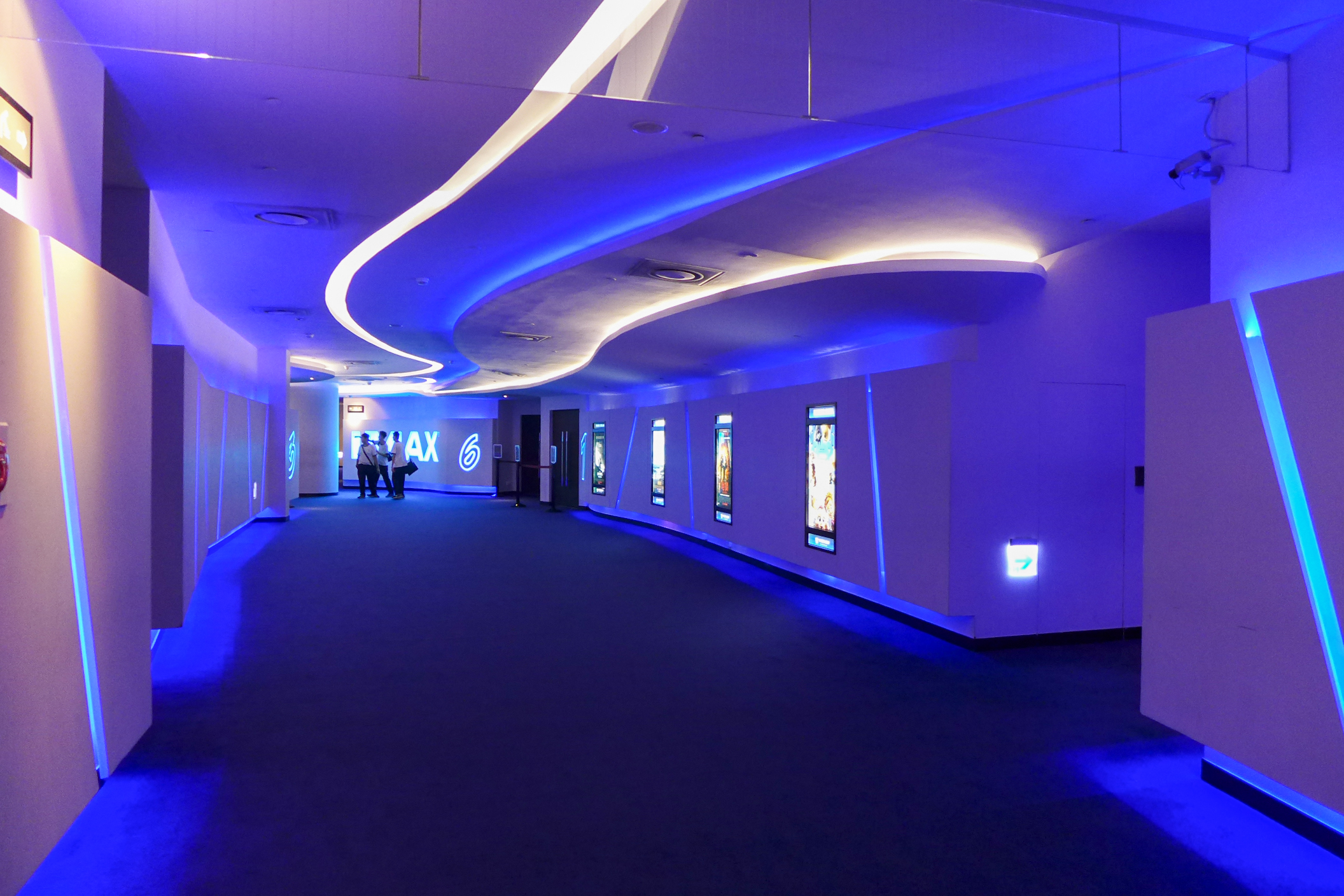
Level 10 Vieshow Cinemas

== See also ==
- List of tourist attractions in Taiwan
- Big City (shopping mall)
- Top City
