= IFG Taichung =

iFG Taichung
- iFG遠雄台中店
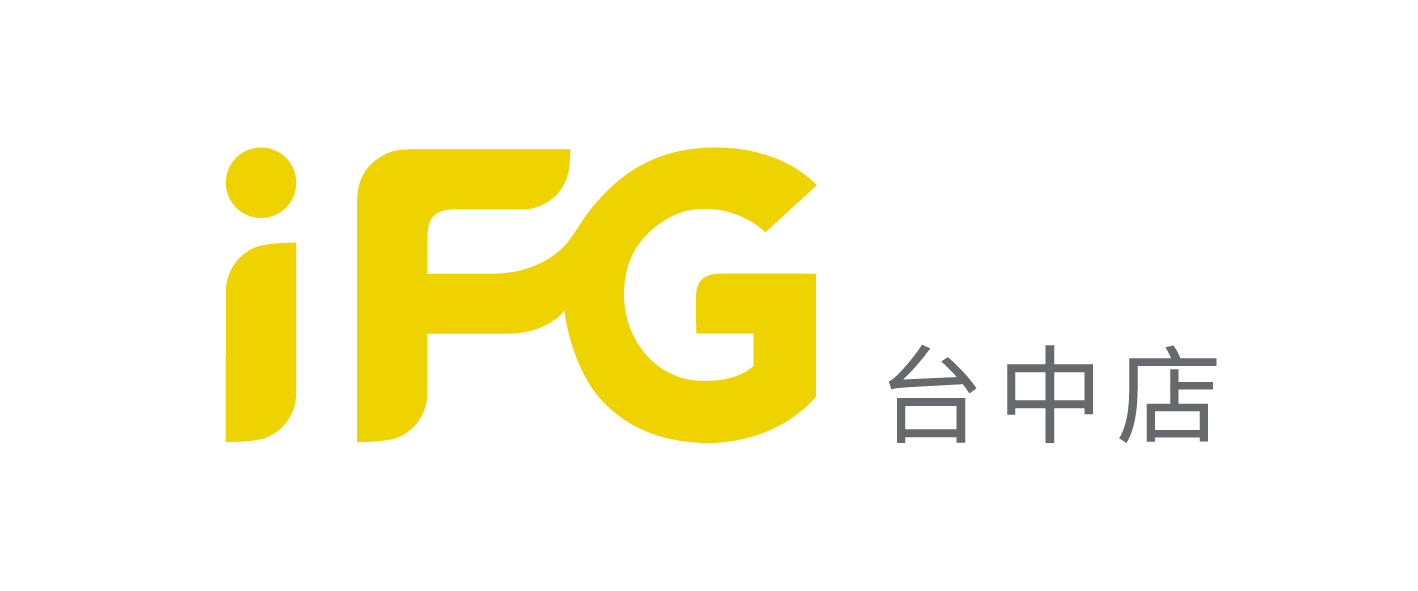

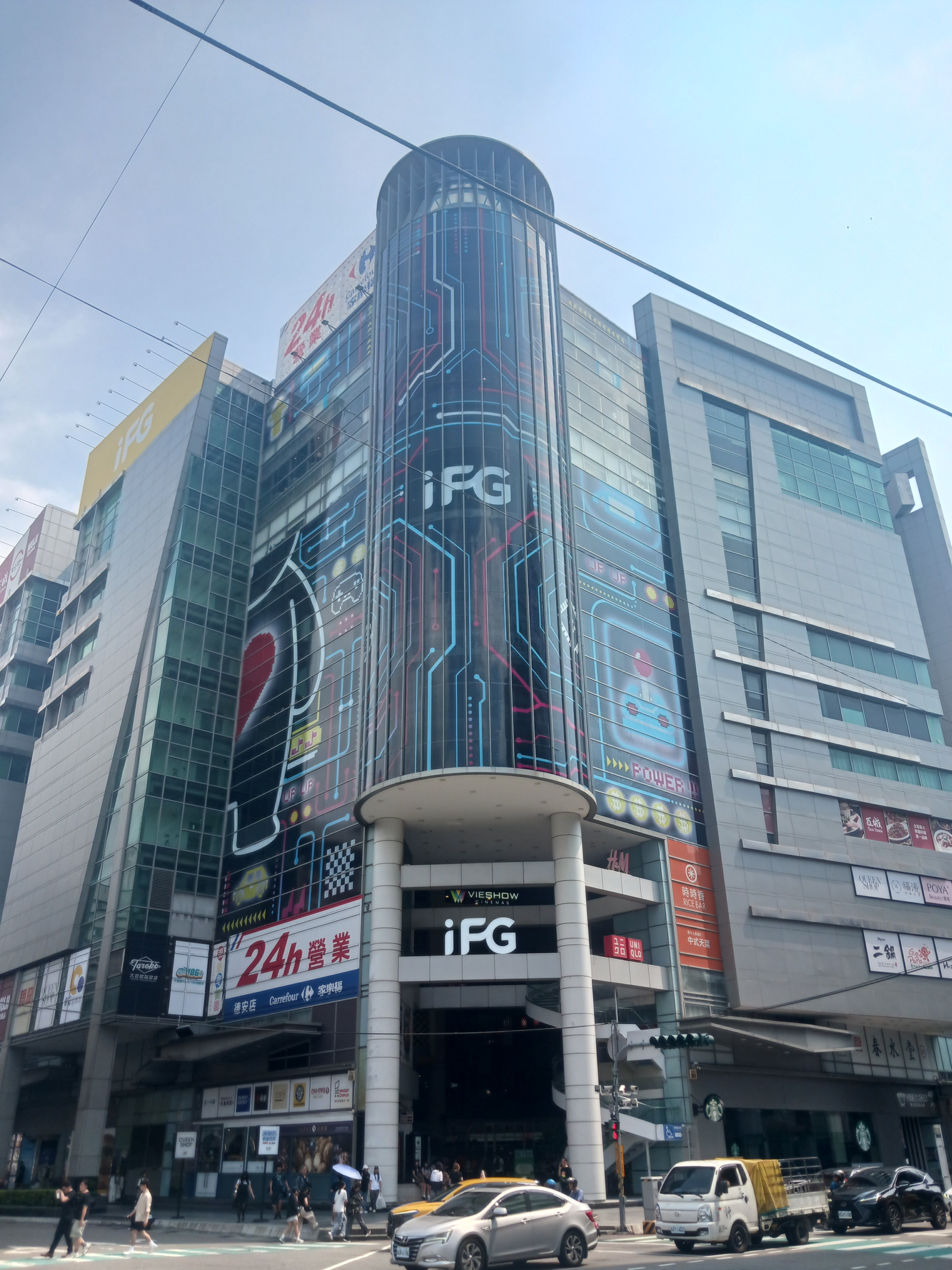
- Location: No. 186, Section 4, Fuxing Road, East District, Taichung, Taiwan
- Coordinates: 24°08′11.76″N 120°41′15″E
- Opened: September 27, 2001
- Floor area: 93,000 m^{2} (1,000,000 sq ft)
- Floors: 11 above ground 6 below ground
- Parking: 800
- Public transit: Taichung station, Taiwan Railway
- Website: http://taichung.trkmall.com.tw/

iFG Taichung (Chinese: iFG遠雄台中店) is a shopping mall in East District, Taichung, Taiwan, opened on September 27, 2001. It was formally known as De An Mall, MODE Mall, and Taroko Mall.With a total floor area of 93,000 m^{2} (1,000,000 sq ft), the core stores of the mall include Carrefour, H&M, Uniqlo, Muji, Fitness Factory, Taroko amusement center, and various restaurants. The total annual revenue in 2020 was approximately NT$2.18 billion.

== History ==
Former logo of Taroko Mall

The mall opened on September 27, 2001, as De An Mall. The name was renamed "MODE Mall" in March 2010. Taroko Development acquired the mall from De An Company and renamed it "Taroko Mall" on July 1, 2015. On November 20, 2025, Taroko Development decided to transfer the mall's management to Farglory Group. The transfer was completed and renamed "iFG Taichung" in 2026.

== Gallery ==
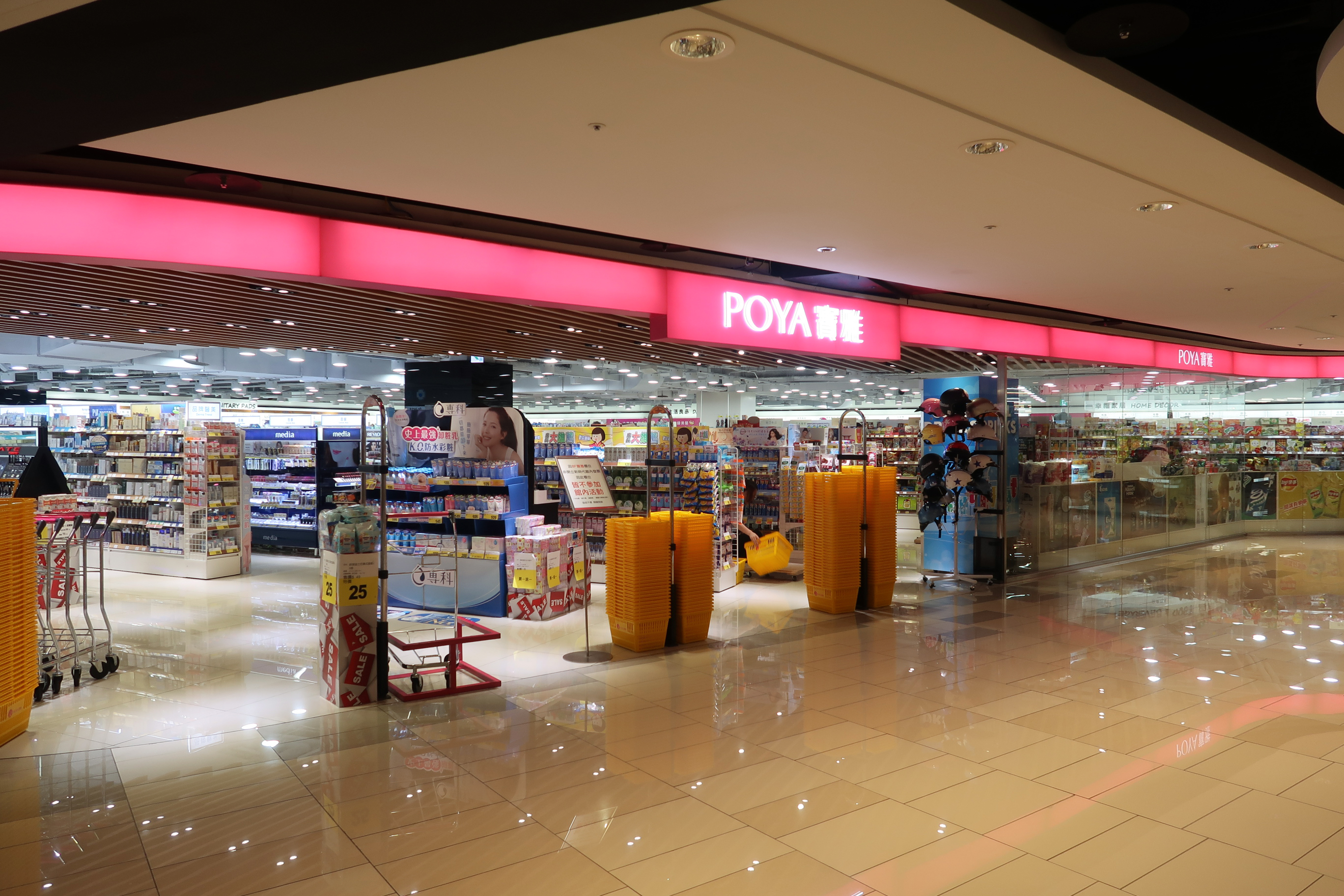
Interior

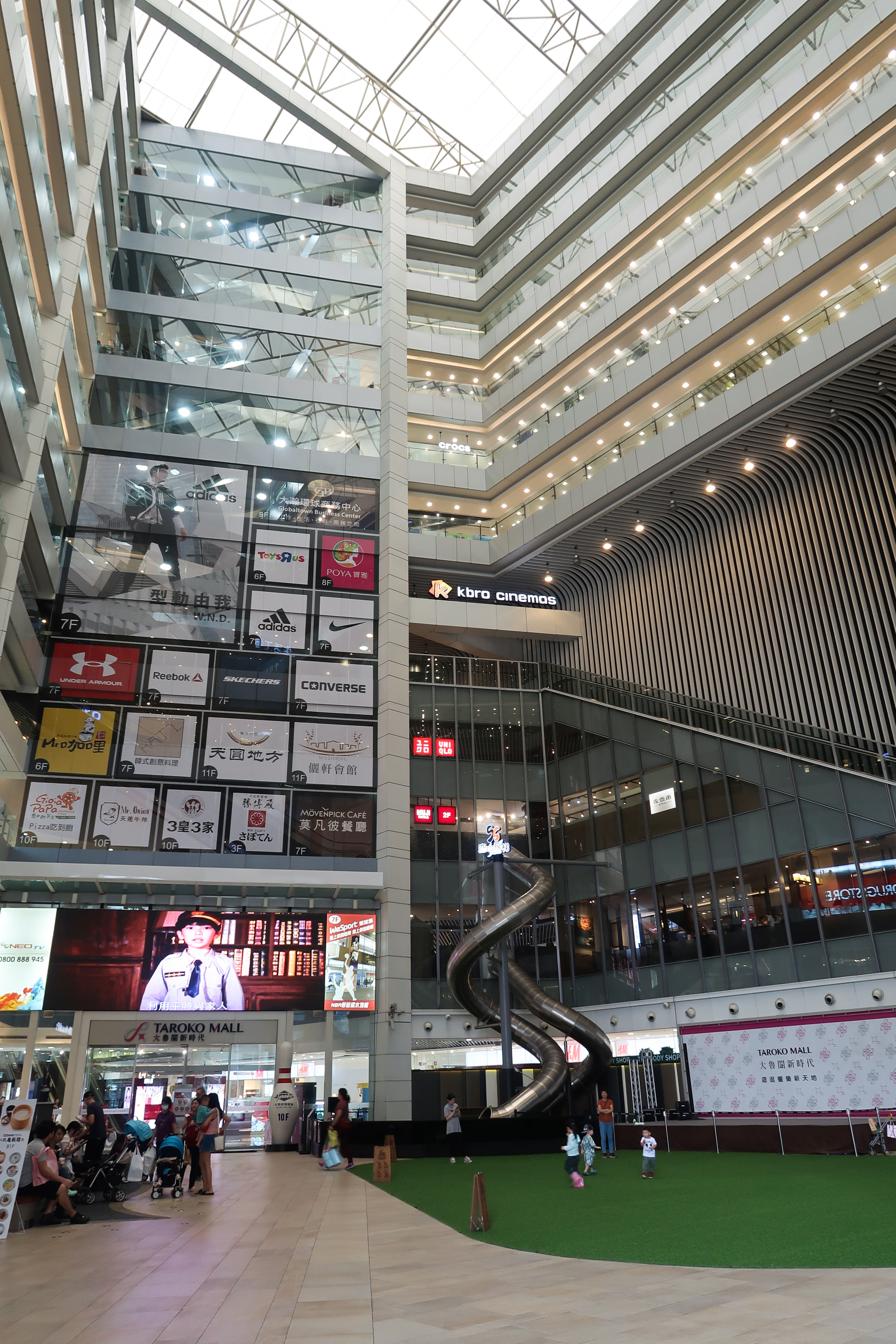
Atrium

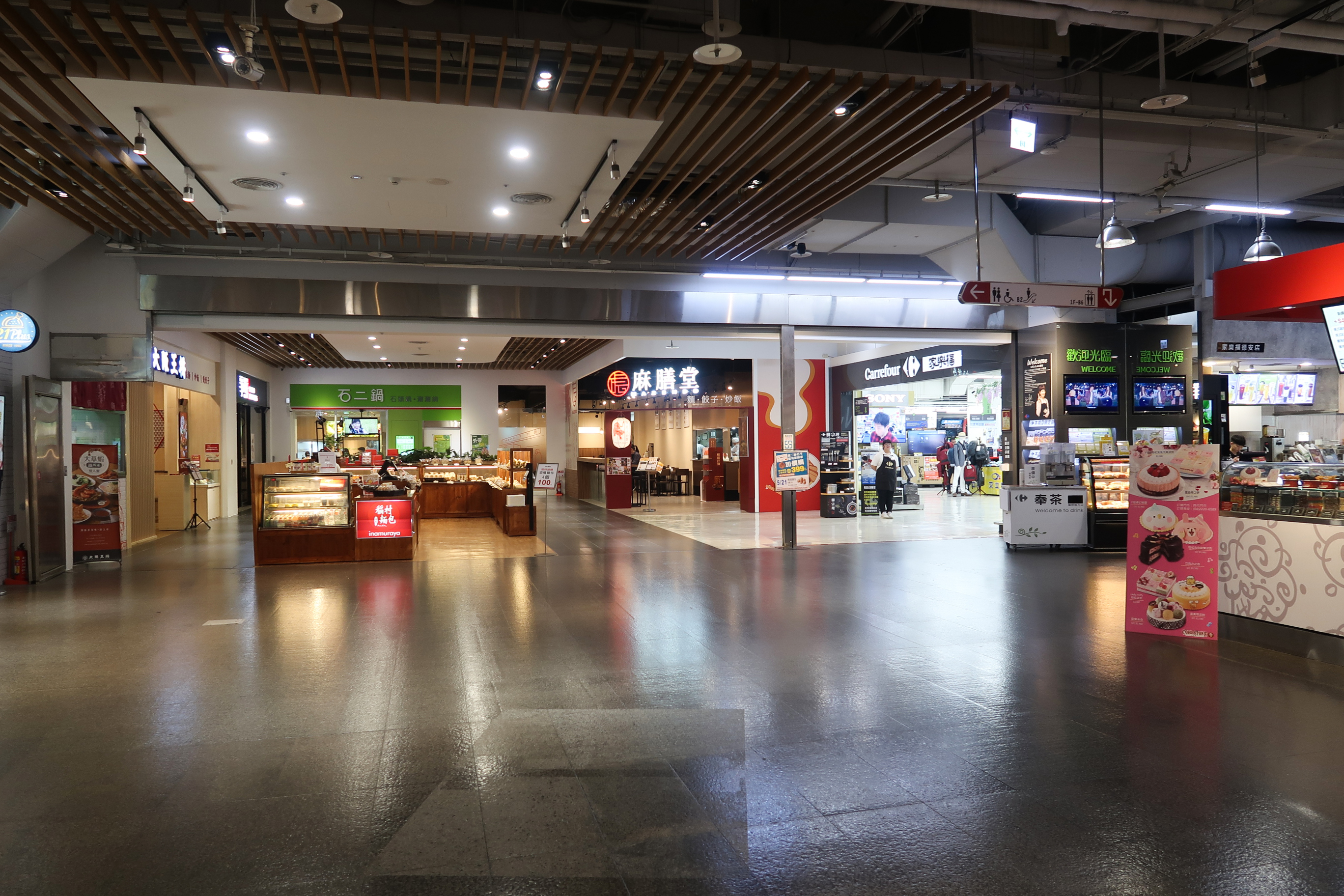
Level B2

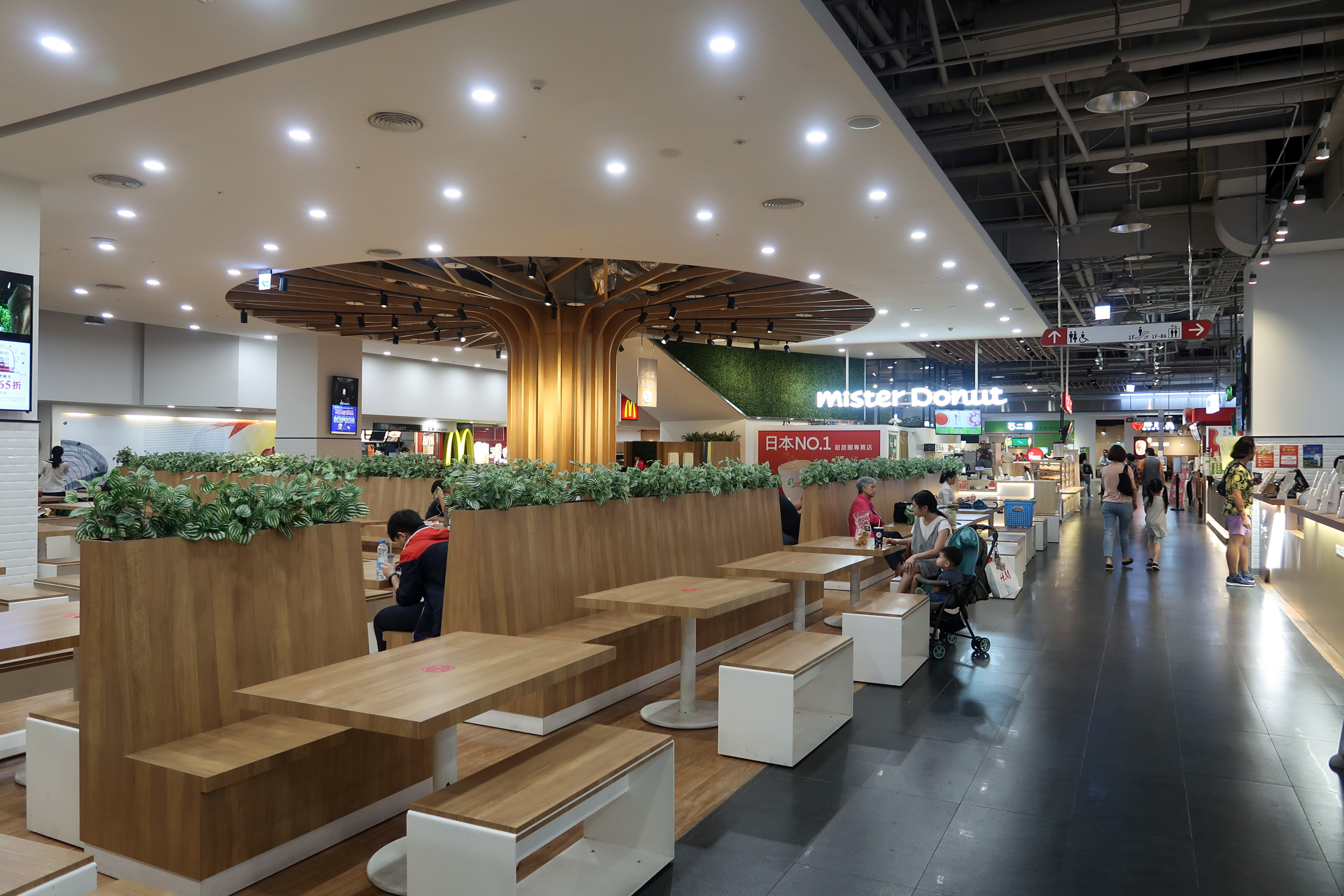
Level B1 Food Court

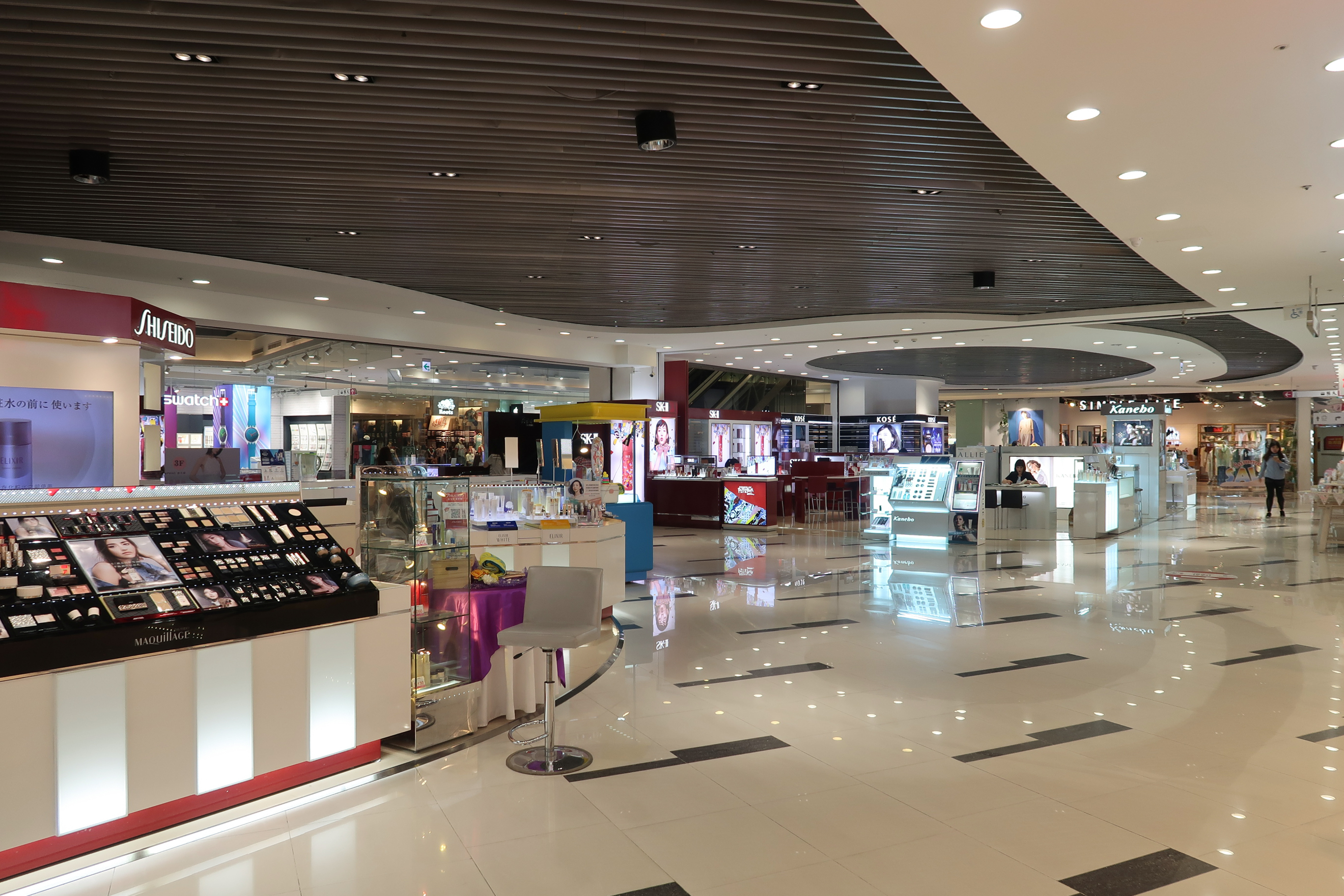
Level 1

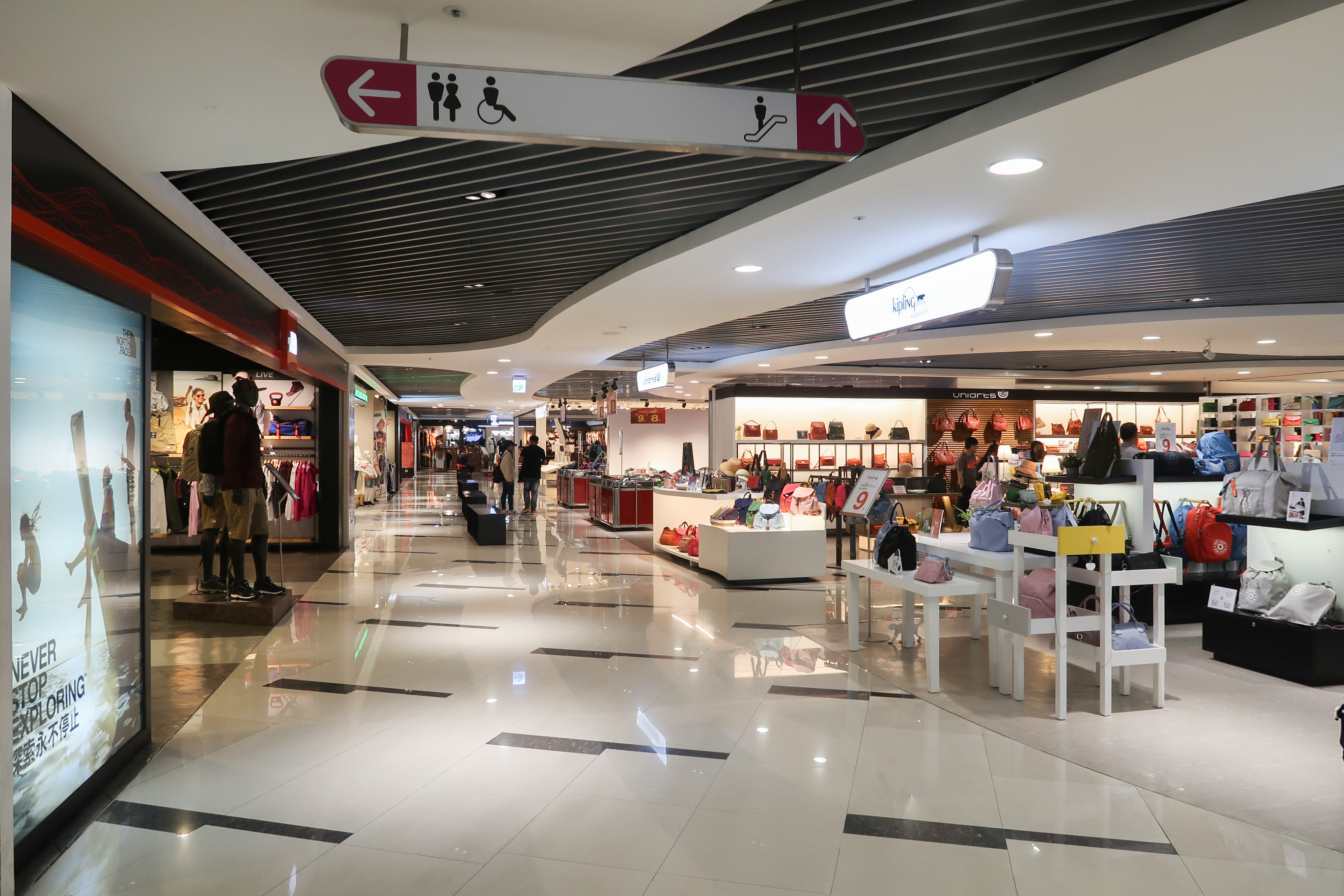
Level 2

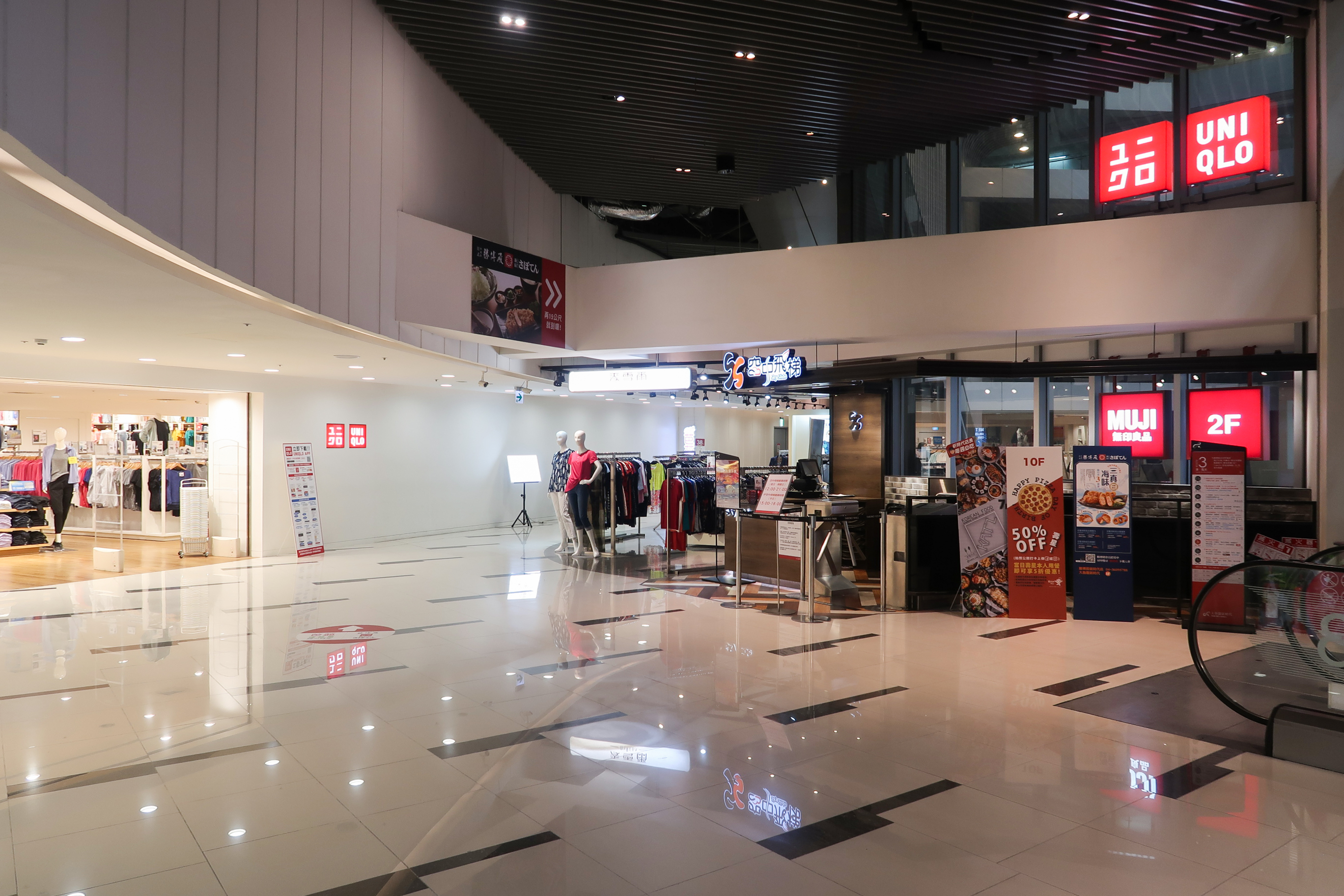
Level 3

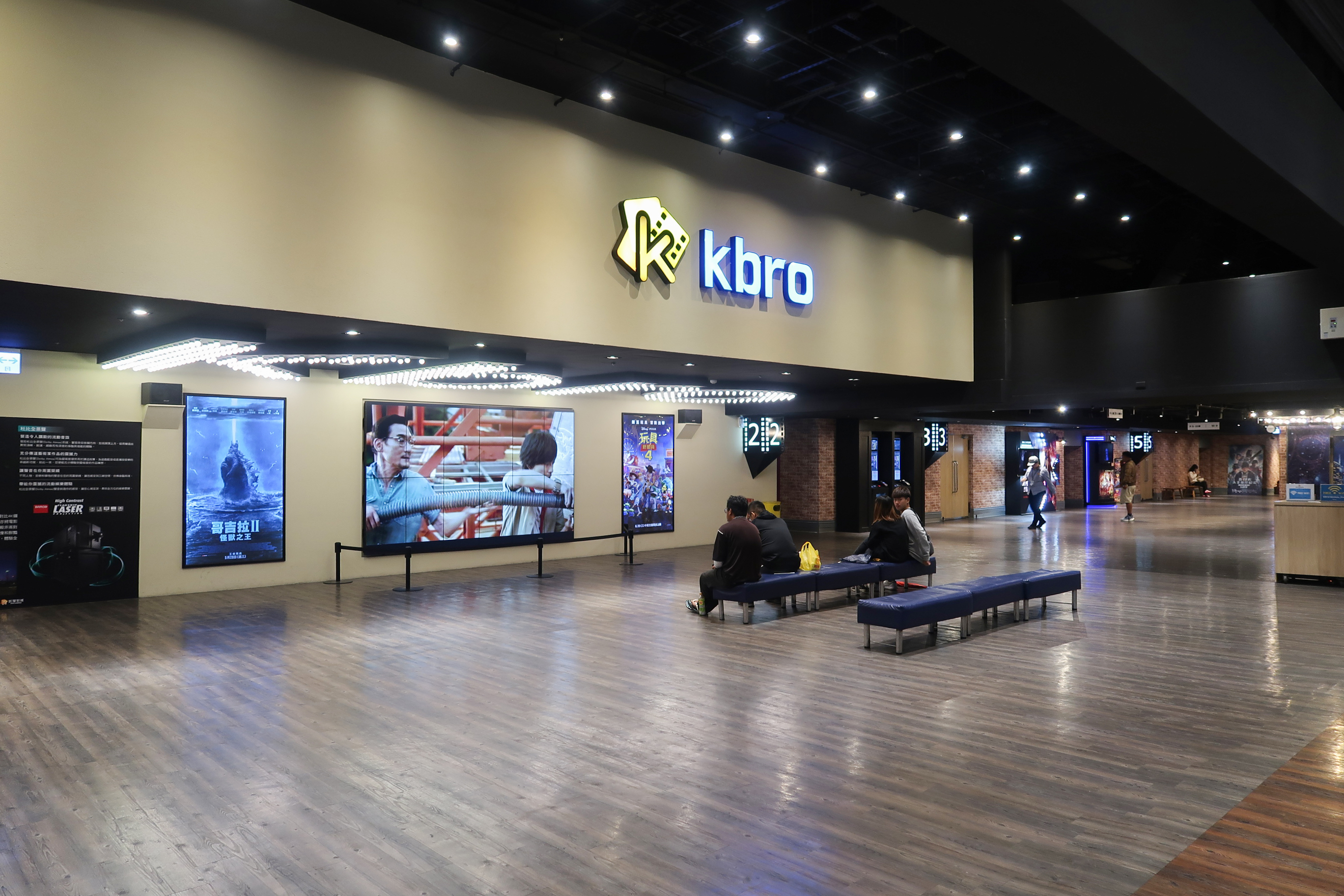
Level 4 kbro cinema

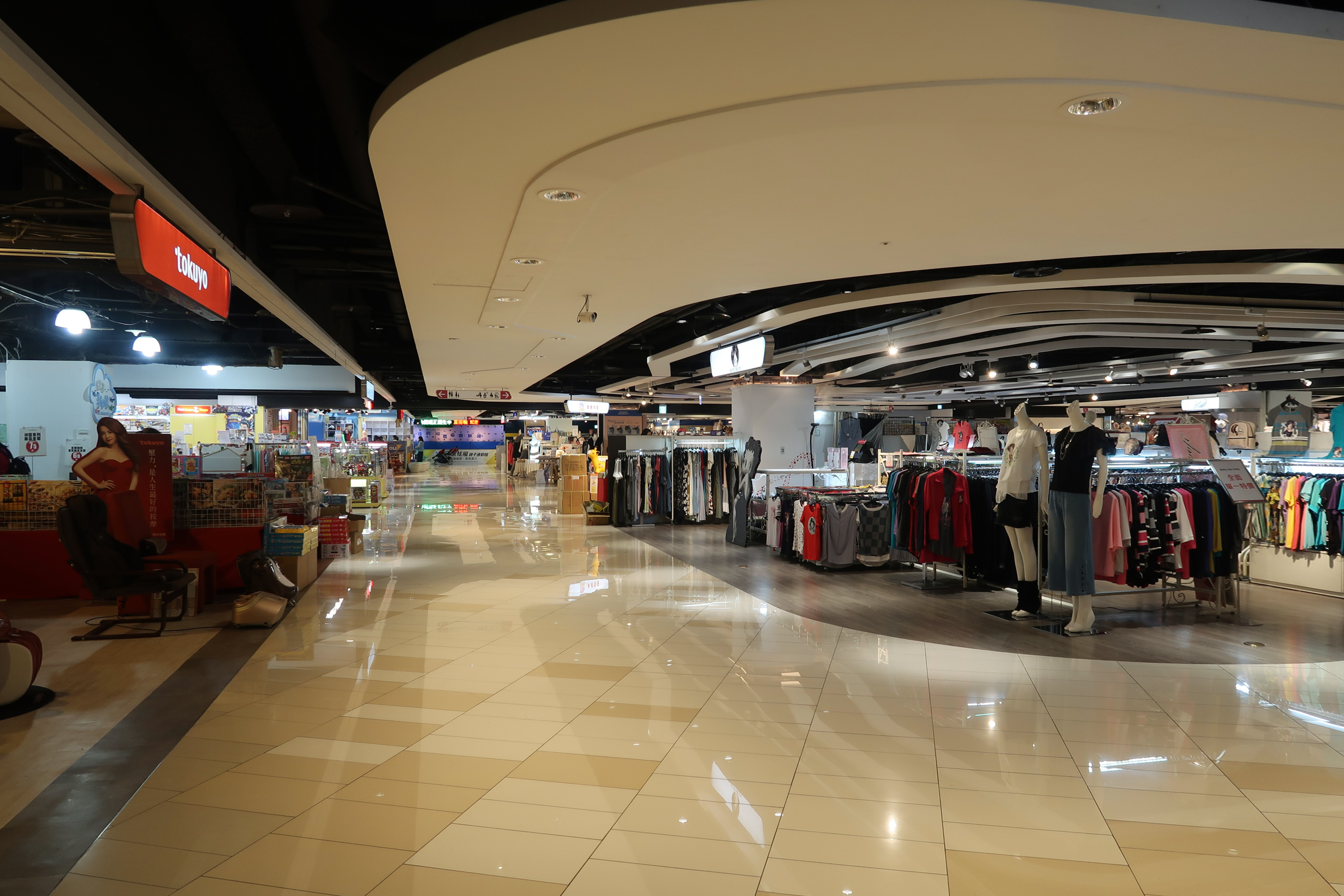
Level 6

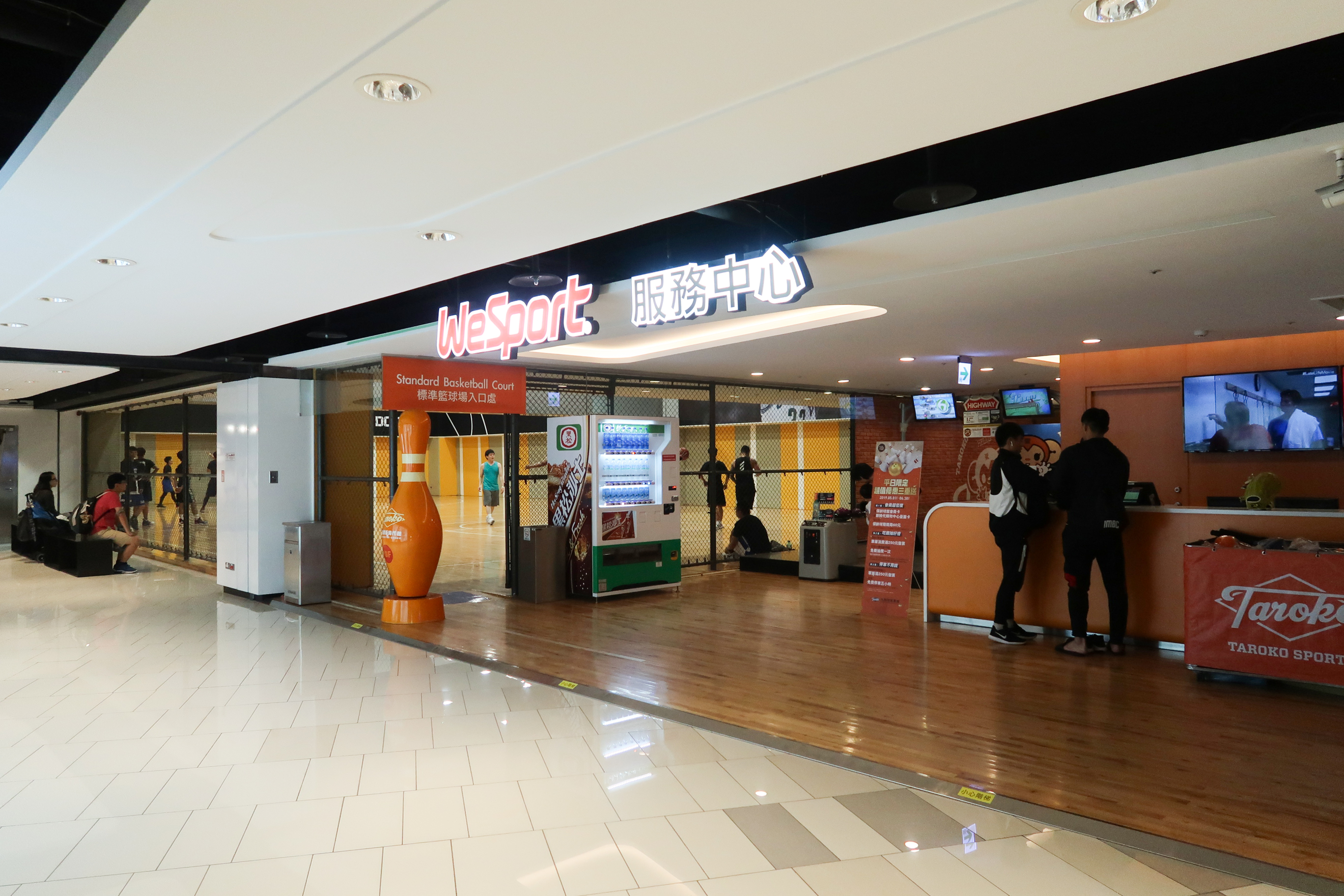
Level 7 WeSport

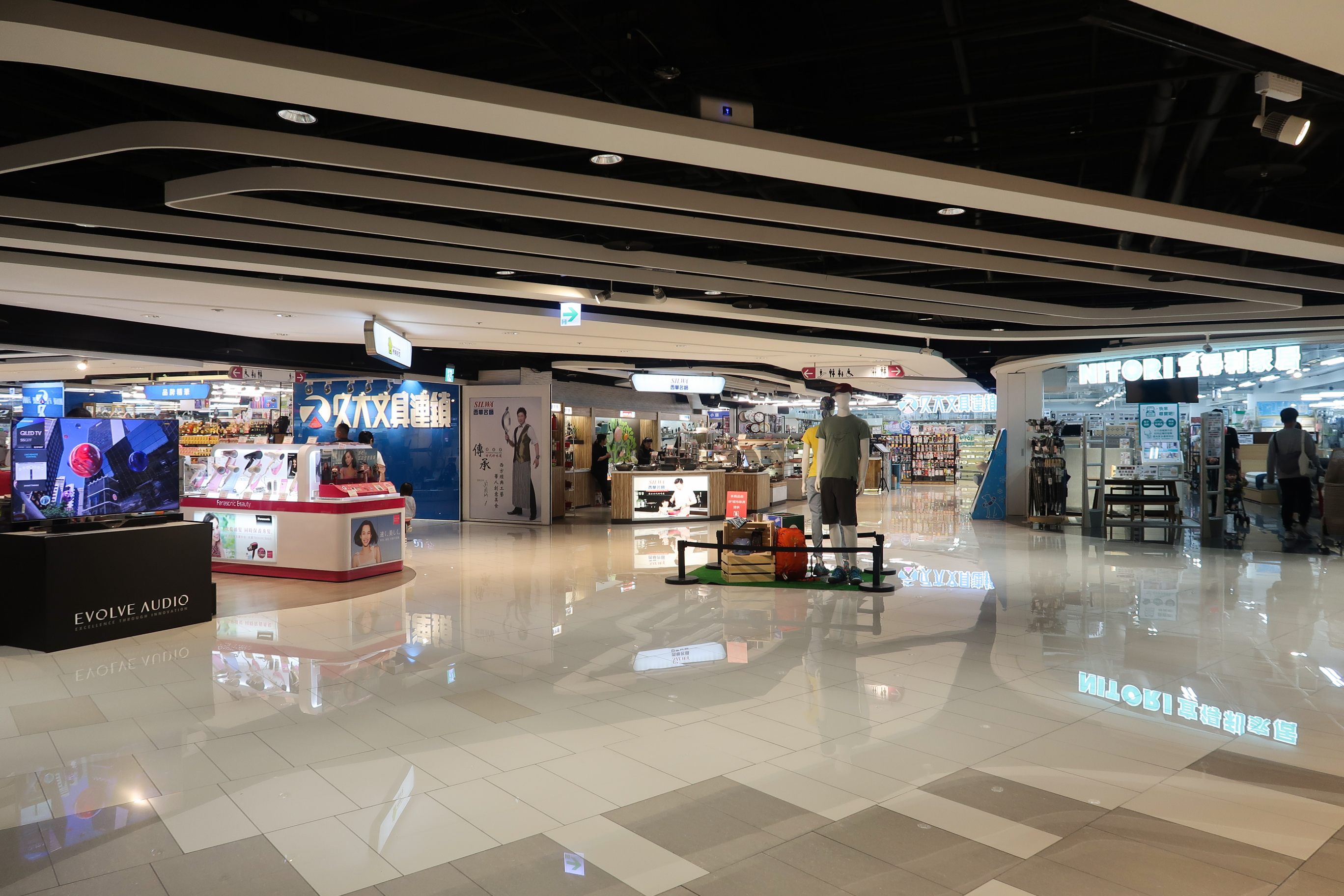
Level 8

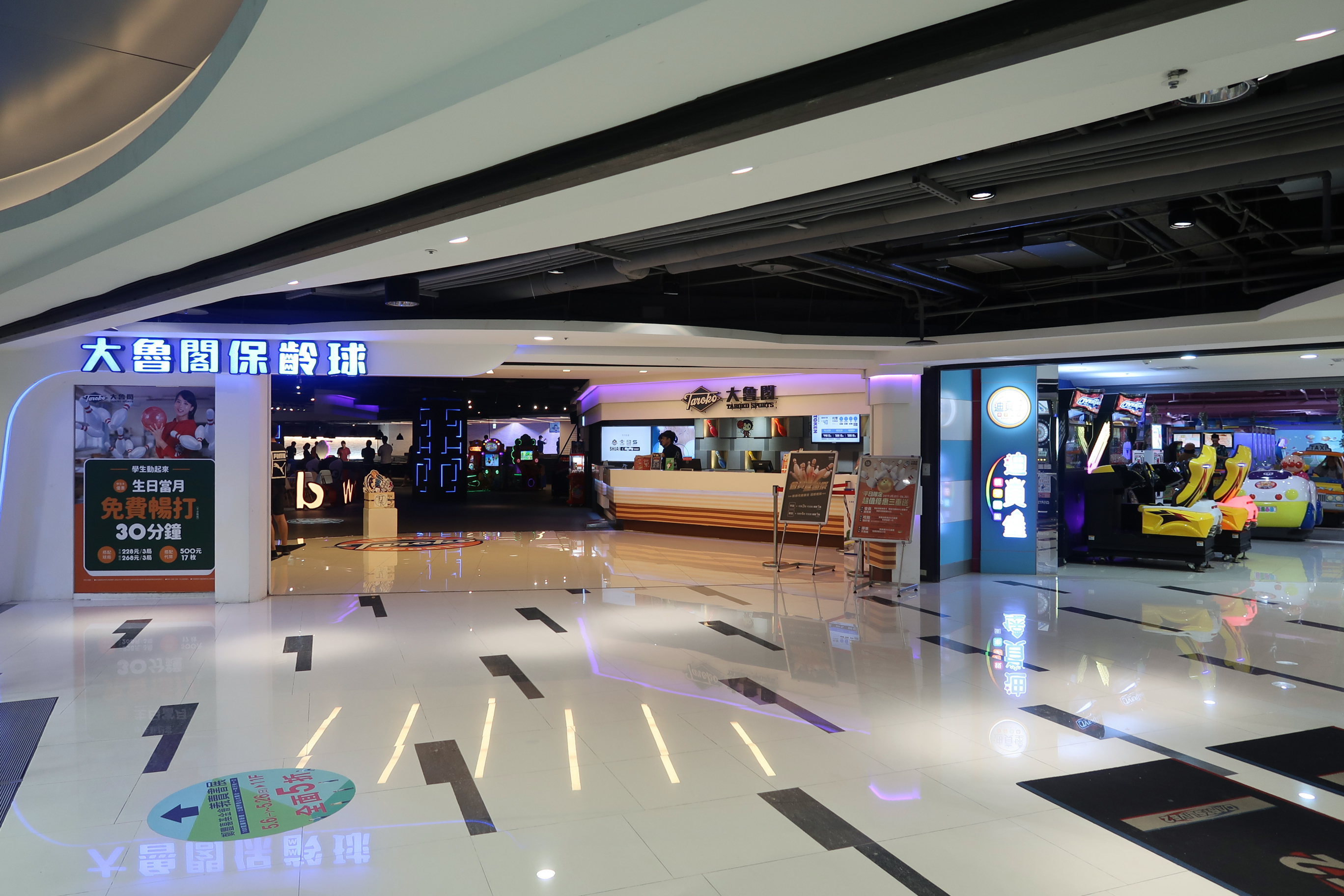
Level 10

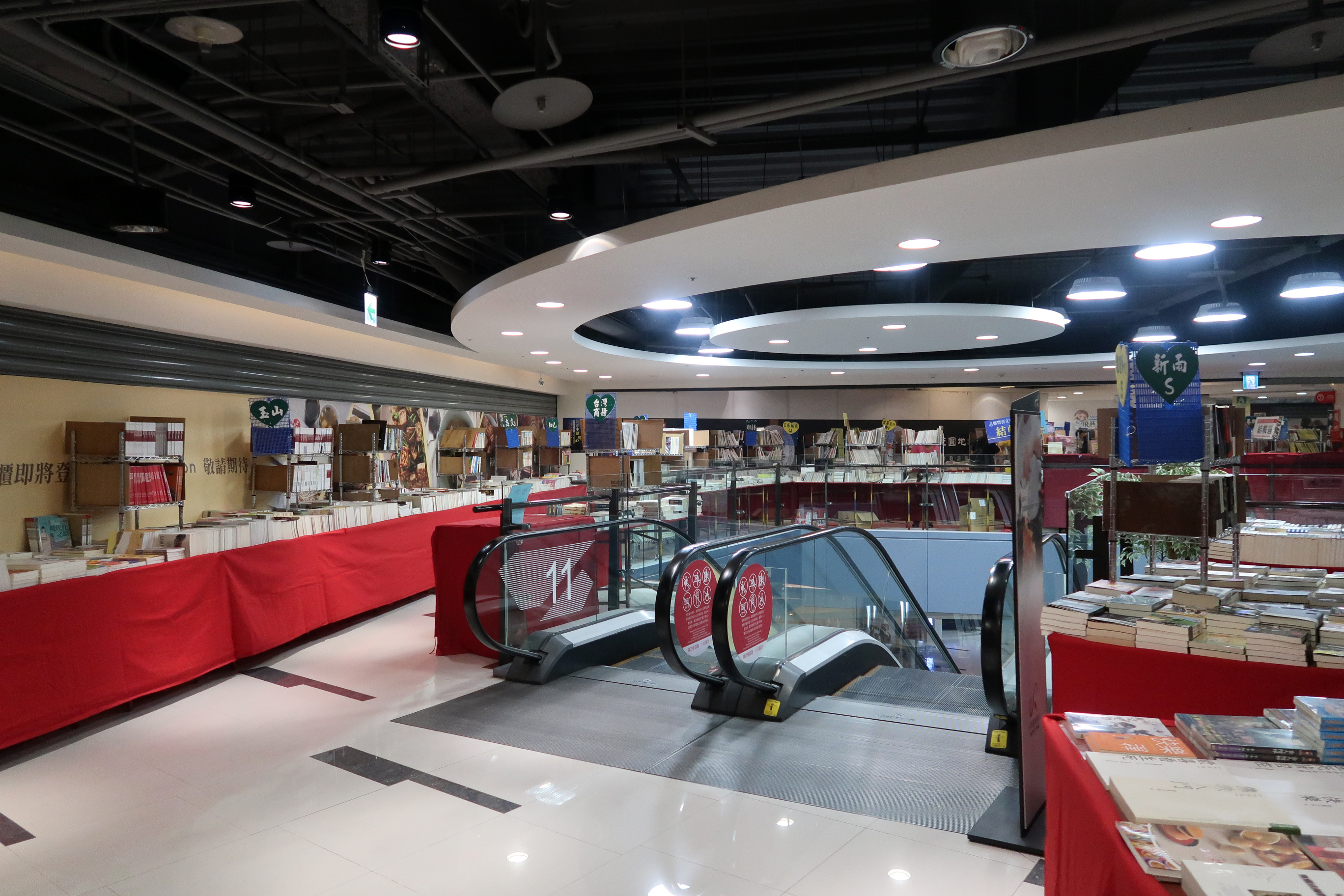
Level 11

== See also ==
- List of tourist attractions in Taiwan
- Taroko Square
- Taroko Park
