= Taroko Square =

Shopping mall in North, Hsinchu, Taiwan

- 大魯閣湳雅廣場

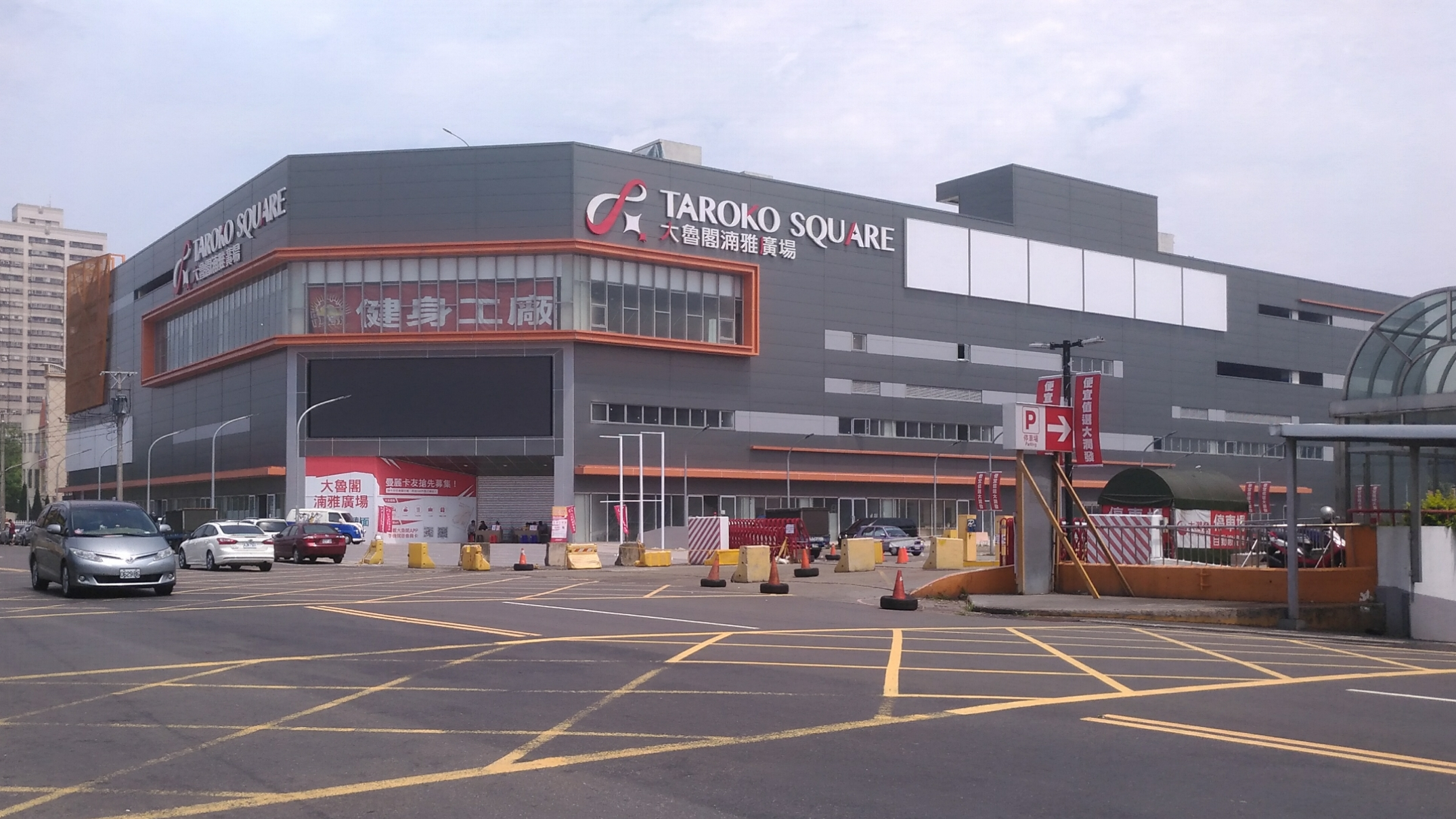
- Location: No. 91-2, Nanya Street, North District, Hsinchu, Taiwan
- Coordinates: 24.81935077806111°N 120.969811211045°E
- Opened: June 1, 2018
- Developer: Taroko Group & RT-Mart
- Manager: Taroko Group
- Floor area: 40,000 m^{2} (430,000 sq ft) (including parking spaces)
- Floors: 4 floors above ground 1 floor below ground
- Parking: 385 parking spaces
- Website: http://hsinchu.trkmall.com.tw/

Taroko Square (Chinese: 大魯閣湳雅廣場; pinyin: Dà lǔ gé nǎn yǎ guǎngchǎng) is a shopping mall in North District, Hsinchu, Taiwan that opened on June 1, 2018 (trial operation on May 11). The total floor area of the mall interior is about 20,000 m^{2} (220,000 sq ft). It is jointly developed by Taroko Group and RT-Mart. The principal stores of the mall are the Taroko baseball and softball field and the SportPark pulley field, Fitness factory, amusement, Nitori home furnishings and various themed restaurants.

== History ==
- Taroko Square officially began construction on June 22, 2016. RT-Mart spent NT$1 billion to construct the building. Taroko Group developed and leased the building for 17 years and was responsible for decoration and subsequent operations. This mall is the first cooperation case between Taroko Group and RT-Mart.
- On May 11, 2018, the Taroko Square was put into trial operation; it officially opened on June 1 of the same year.

== Gallery ==
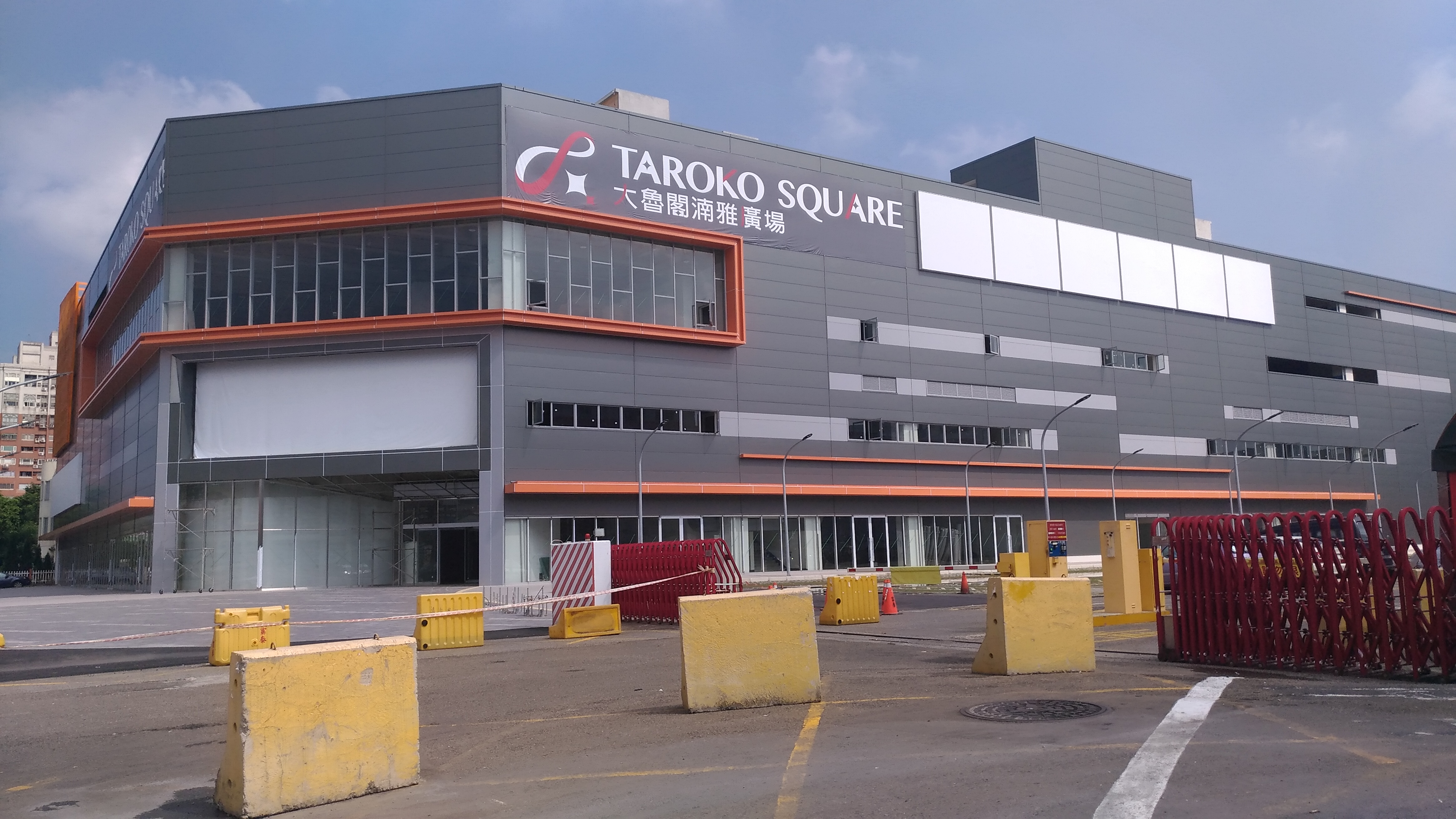
Exterior

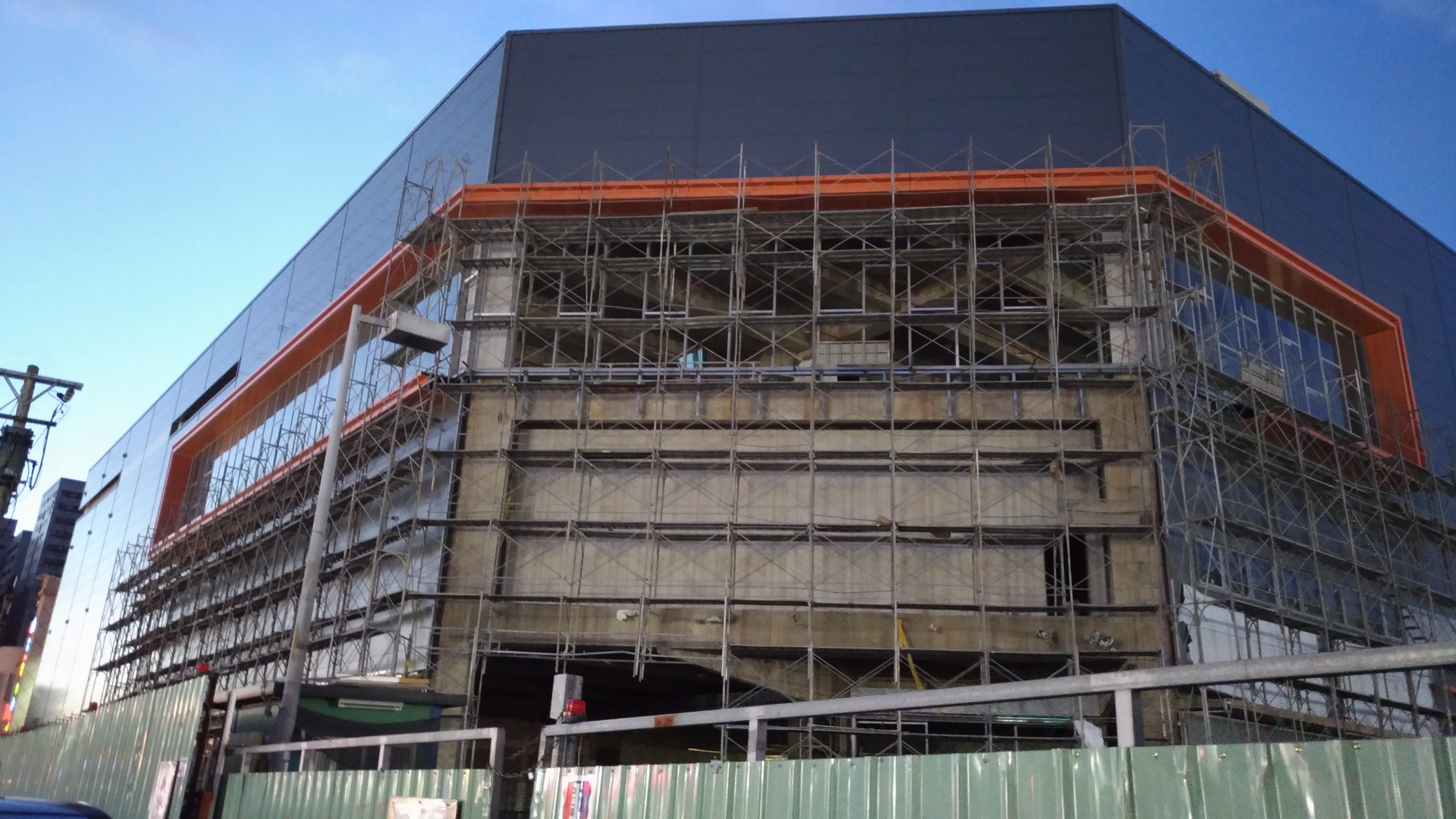
Under construction in 2017

== See also ==
- List of tourist attractions in Taiwan
- Big City (shopping mall)
