= A.mart =

Taiwanese hypermarket chain

a.mart
- Native name: 愛買
- Company type: Private
- Founded: 1990
- Headquarters: New Taipei City, Taiwan
- Area served: Taiwan
- Parent: Far Eastern Group

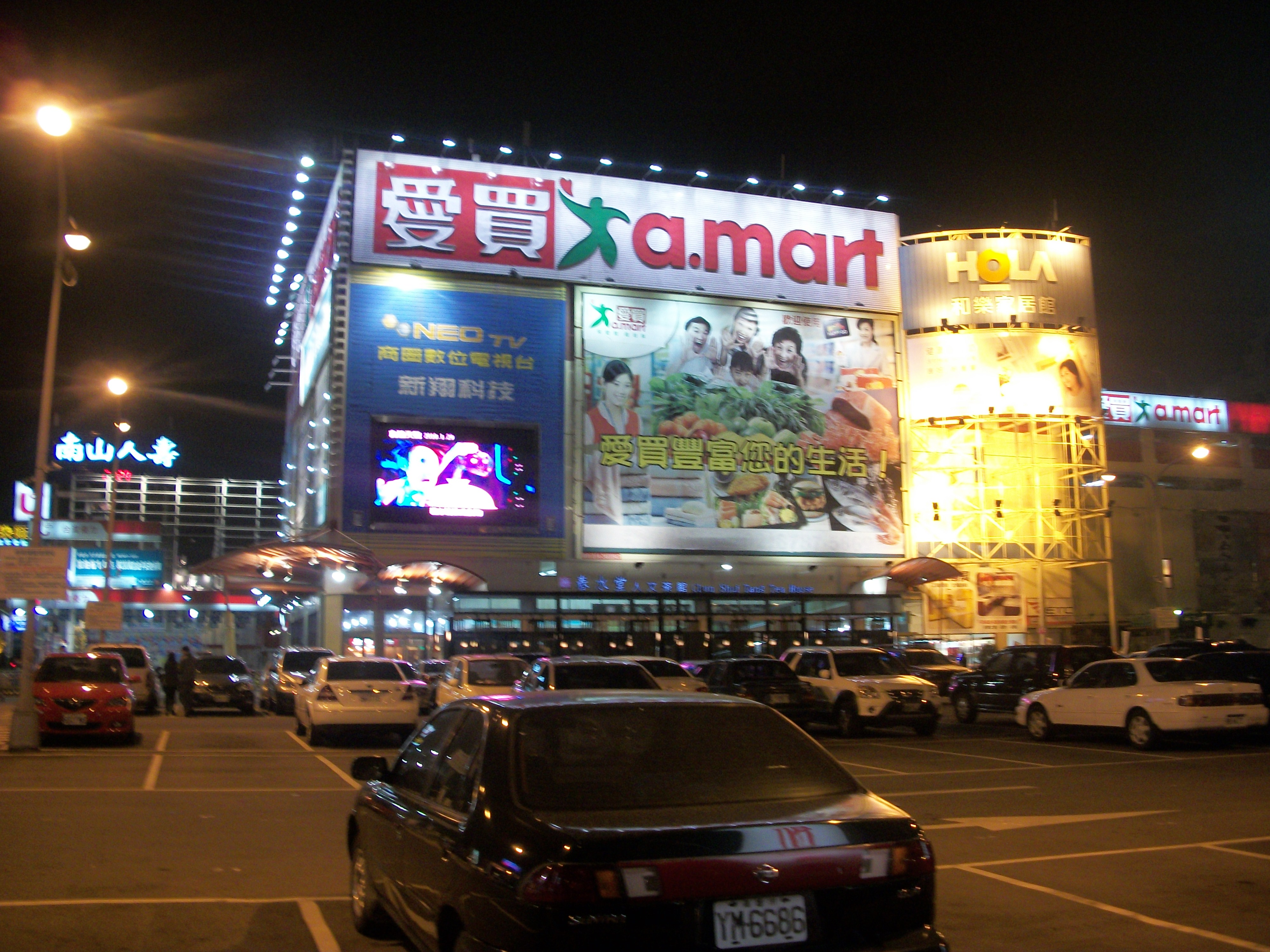
A-Mart in Taichung

Far Eastern A-mart Co., Ltd. (Chinese: 遠百企業股份有限公司; pinyin: Yuànbǎi Qǐyè Gǔfèn Yǒuxiàn Gōngsī), doing business as a.mart (愛買; Àimǎi), is a hypermarket chain in Taiwan. It is a direct subsidiary of Far Eastern Department Stores, which in turn is part of the Far Eastern Group conglomerate. It has its head office in Zhongzheng District, Taipei.

== History ==
The company was known as Far Eastern Geant Co., Ltd. (same corporate name in Chinese), doing business as Far Eastern Géant (愛買Géant/愛買吉安; Àimǎi Jí'ān). The store began offering a membership card in 2004.

In September 2006, Groupe Casino sold its 50% stake, which was worth $738 million New Taiwan dollars, to Far Eastern Department Stores. In 2006, Far Eastern Geant was still the third largest hypermarket chain in Taiwan, with over NT$13 billion in sales; this was an 11% increase from its 2005 figures. At that time the company was still making losses.

== See also ==
- List of companies of Taiwan
- List of supermarket chains in Taiwan
