= C!ty'super =

Retail chain in Asia

city'super
- Founded: December 1996
- Area served: Hong Kong, Taiwan, Mainland China
- Brands: city'super; LOG-ON; cookedDeli
- Website: c!ty'super

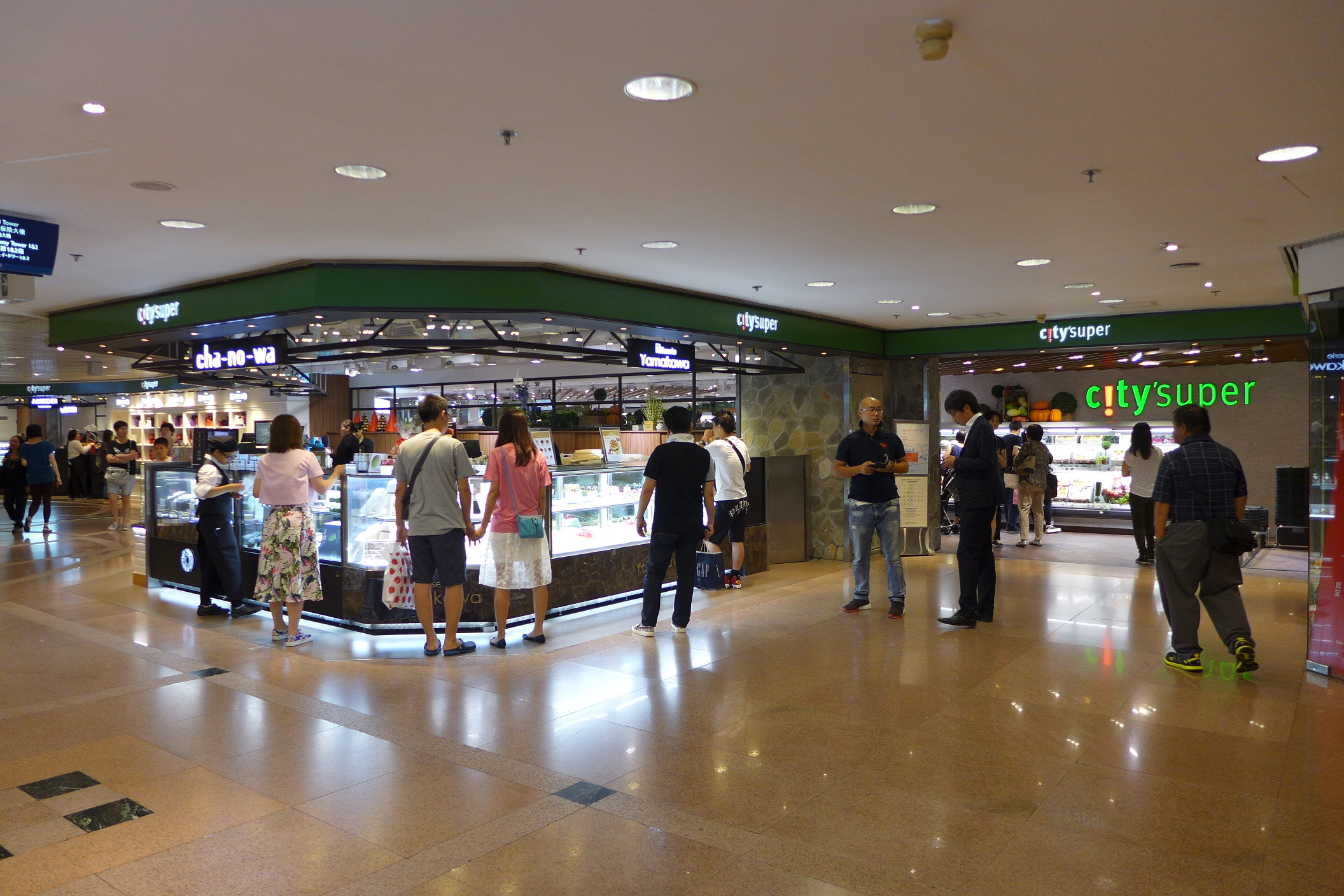
citysuper in Harbour City

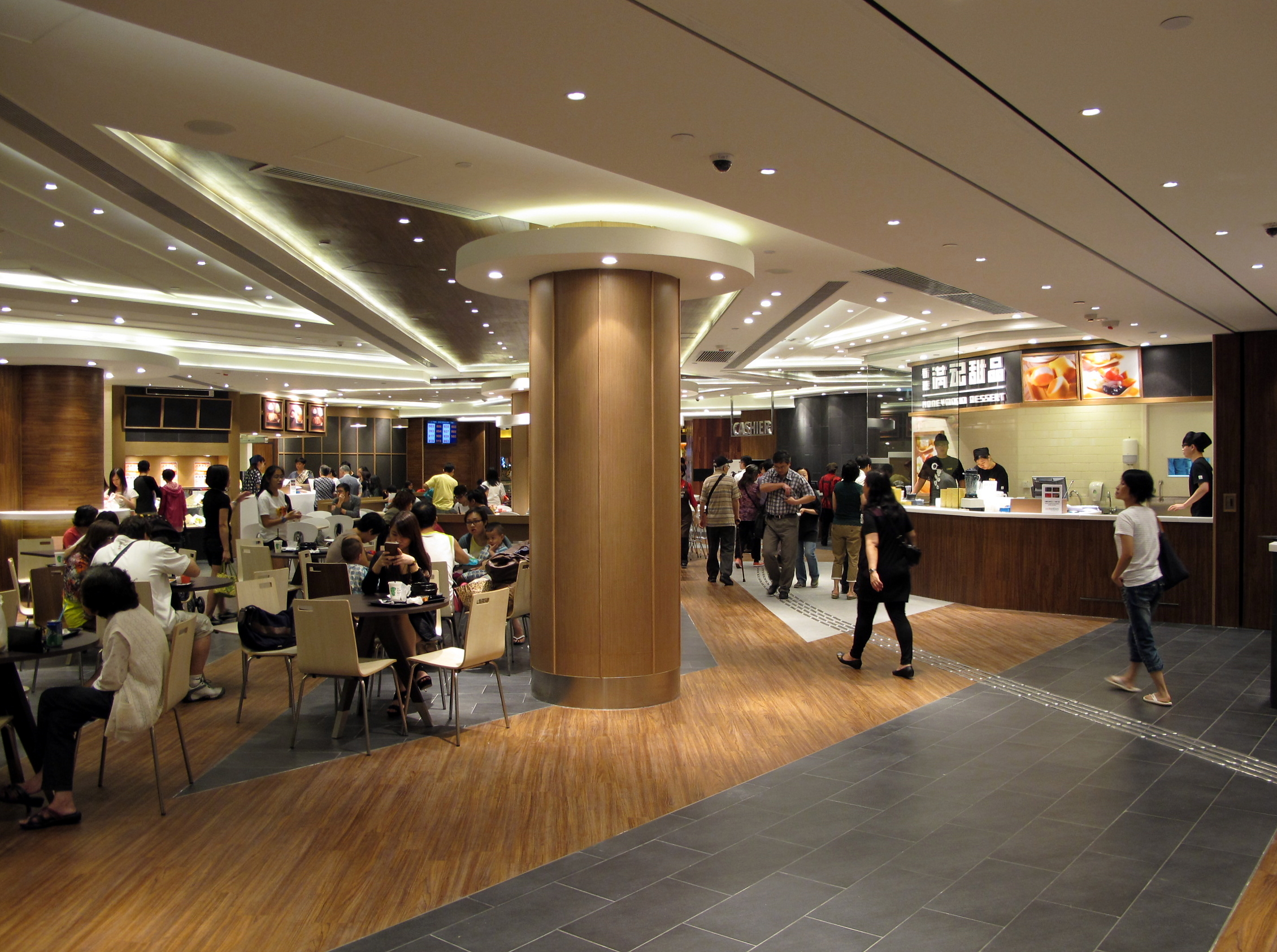
cooked Deli in PopCorn2, Tseung Kwan O

C!ty'super, stylised in logos as "c!ty'super" (the company name is City Super Limited), is a retail chain in Hong Kong, mainland China and Taiwan. Positioned as a mega lifestyle specialty store, its core format of upmarket supermarkets sell primarily fresh produce and groceries. The Company also operates LOG-ON which offers stationery, cosmetics, gadgets, fashion accessories and travel goods. It also operates a food court business called cookedDeli. City’super specialises in upmarket specialist products and premium imported groceries, which differentiates it from other supermarkets that operate across Greater China. As of June 2018, the Company has 23 stores in Hong Kong, 10 in Shanghai and 8 in Taiwan under the 3 brands.

== Cultural impact ==
city'super specialises in imported produce and goods and holds regular thematic promotional events to popularise its imported goods such as Taiwan Fair, Sake Fair, Cheese Fair, Seafood & Sparling Fair.

The chain has been called "elitist" with its premium and unique selection of specialist produce. Its high-end fruit is a popular choice for gift-giving especially during festivals and celebrations.

== Ownership ==
city'super is majority owned by Fenix Group, with Wharf Group being the other key shareholder. It was acquired by China Resources in 2021.
