= Far Eastern Group =

Conglomerate in Taiwan

- Native name: 遠東集團
- Company type: Public
- Founded: 1937
- Founder: Yu-Ziang Hsu
- Headquarters: Number 207, Dunhua South Road, Section 2, Taipei, Republic of China
- Key people: Douglas Hsu (Chairman)
- Website: Official Website

Far Eastern Group
- Traditional Chinese: 遠東集團
- Simplified Chinese: 远东集团
Transcriptions
Standard Mandarin
- Hanyu Pinyin: Yuǎndōng Jítuán

Far Eastern Group is one of the biggest conglomerates in the Republic of China (ROC, Taiwan). It was founded in 1937 by Yu-Ziang Hsu during the mainland Republican period. The group spans over 10 major industries and includes 9 publicly listed companies. The total assets of the group exceed NT$2,500 billion (US$75.8 billion), with annual revenues surpassing NT$610 billion (US$18.7 billion).

== Businesses ==
=== Petrochemicals and energy ===
- Oriental Union Chemical Corporation (TWSE: 1710)
- Air Liquide Far Eastern Limited
- Chiahui Power Corporation
- Oriental Petrochemical (Taiwan) Corporation
- Oriental Petrochemical (Shanghai) Corporation
- Alberta & Orient Glycol Ltd.

=== Polyester and synthetic fibers ===
- Far Eastern New Century (formerly Far Eastern Textile) (TWSE: 1402)
- Everest Textile Company Limited (TWSE: 1460)
- Oriental Resources Development Limited
- Wuhan Far Eastern New Material Company Limited
- Freudenberg Far Eastern Spunweb Company Limited
- Far Eastern Fibertech Company Limited
- Sino Belgium Beer (Suzhou) Limited
- Far Eastern Apparel Company Limited
- Far Eastern Industries (Shanghai) Limited
- Far Eastern Apparel (Suzhou) Limited
- Far Eastern Industries (Wuxi) Limited
- Far Eastern Dyeing & Finishing (Suzhou) Limited
- Oriental Industries (Suzhou) Limited

=== Cement and building materials ===
- Asia Cement Company Limited (TWSE: 1102)
- Asia Cement (Singapore) Pte. Limited
- Kowloon Cement Corporation Limited
- Asia Cement (China) Holdings Corporation
- Ya Tung Ready Mixed Concrete Company Limited
- Nanhua Cement Company Limited
- Ya Li Precast & Prestressed Concrete Industries Limited
- Yuan Long Stainless Steel Corporation
- Shanghai Yali Concrete Limited
- Jiangxi Yadong Cement Limited
- Nanchang Yadong Cement Company Limited
- Sichuan Ya Dong Cement Corporation Limited
- Hubei Yadong Cement Company Limited
- Wuhan Ya Dong Cement Company Limited
- Huanggang Yadong Cement Company Limited
- Yangzhou Yadong Cement Company Limited

=== Retail and department stores ===
- Far Eastern Department Stores Company Limited (TWSE: 2903)
- Ya Dung Department Store Company Limited
- Far Eastern Ai Mai Company Limited
- Pacific SOGO Department Stores Company Limited
- Chongqing Metropolitan Plaza Pacific Department Store Company Limited
- Chengdou Chunxi Masion Pacific Department Store Company Limited
- Pacific Dept Stores (Dalian) Company Limited
- Chengdu Quanxing Masion Pacific Department Store Company Limited
- Shanghai Department Store Company Limited
- BeiJing Xidan Pacific Department Store Company Limited
- Chongqing Feds Company Limited
- Tianjin FEDS Company Limited
- Wuxi FEDS Company Limited
- Ding Ding Integrated Marketing Service Company Limited
- Far Eastern City Super

=== Financial services ===
- Far Eastern International Bank (TWSE: 2845)
- Far Eastern International Leasing Corporation
- Oriental Securities Company Limited
- Oriental Securities Investment Advisory Company Limited
- Deutsche Far Eastern Asset Management Company Limited
- Far Eastern Life Insurance Agency Company Limited

=== Sea/land transportation ===
- U-Ming Marine Transport Corporation (TWSE: 2606)
- Fu-Ming Transportation Company Limited
- Ya Li Transportation Company Limited
- Fu Da Transport Company Limited
- U-Ming Marine Transport (Singapore) Pte. Limited
- Wuhan Asia Marine Transport Corporation Limited

=== Communications and Internet ===
- FarEasTone Telecommunications Company Limited (TWSE: 4904)
- New Century InfoComm Tech Company
- Ding Ding Management Consultants Company Limited
- Universal eXchange Inc.
- Qware Communications Company Limited
- Arcoa Communication Company Limited
- Far Eastern Electronic Toll Collection Company Limited
- Digital United Inc.
- KGEx.com Company Limited
- Far Eastern Tech-info (Shanghai) Limited
- ADCast Interactive Marketing Company Limited

== See also ==
- List of companies of Taiwan
