= Amanda Yiyen =

Taiwanese pianist and singer-songwriter

Amanda Wu (Chinese: 吳苡嫣; born December 23, 1982) is a Taiwanese jazz/classical pianist, singer-songwriter, arranger, fashion influencer, and inspirational speaker. She is the first and only Taiwanese musician to be selected by Cirque Du Soleil. At 28 years old, she was invited to give a speech and perform at TEDxTaipei on the topic "The Power of Journey". Wu is well known for creating eclectic, Jazzy-pop style of music with deep classical influence.

== Early life ==
Born in Taichung City, Wu grew up in Taiwan and studied classical piano and oboe at the top music schools. She began her music career young when she enrolled in the prestigious music elementary school Gung Fu. Since she was eight years old, Yiyen has achieved awards in piano, oboe, singing, composition and speech. In 1991, 1992, and 1995, Yiyen was chosen to be the representative of Taiwan to perform her composition at the Asia Oceanic Junior Original Concert (AOJOC).

By the time Yiyen reached the age of 15, she was accepted with the highest scores into the Tainan National University of the Arts. That summer, she played the oboe and toured with the Taiwan Youth Orchestra throughout France, Austria, Hungary and Romania.

At the age of 20, she attended McGill University in Montreal, Canada, and graduated in 2006 with a bachelor's degree in music, with a concentration on Jazz Piano.

== Musical career ==
Wu has been invited by the American National Symphony Orchestra as the pianist and keyboardist to perform with celebrity musicians, including Italian vocalist Andrea Bocelli, Hollywood soundtrack composer George Fenton, Japanese animation soundtrack composer Joe Hisaishi, DJ/author Shiuan Liu, and singer-songwriter Joanna Wang. In 2011, she arranged the album The Adventures of Bernie the Schoolboy for Wang.

She has released one album and two EPs, including Jazz without Time Zones (2010), original series The Journey On Earth, Vol.1: Unknown (2014), and Vol.2: Stories of Time (2017).

== Transitional career ==
At 30 years old, she moved to New York City and obtained an Alien with Extraordinary Ability Visa, also known as a genius visa. Yiyen became influenced by the vibrant city, developing an appreciation for fashion and business. She collaborated with mixing engineer Paul Wickliffe to produce her original EP, The Journey on Earth, Vol 1: Unknown. Shortly after, she was chosen by Cirque Du Soleil for a second time as an oboist and backup vocalist. She also travelled to Europe to collaborate with the producer of the German band Jazzanova.

At 34, Amanda Yiyen expanded her brand name beyond her music career. She is currently residing in New York City as a creative entrepreneur, fashion influencer, and spiritual mentor through her blog.
