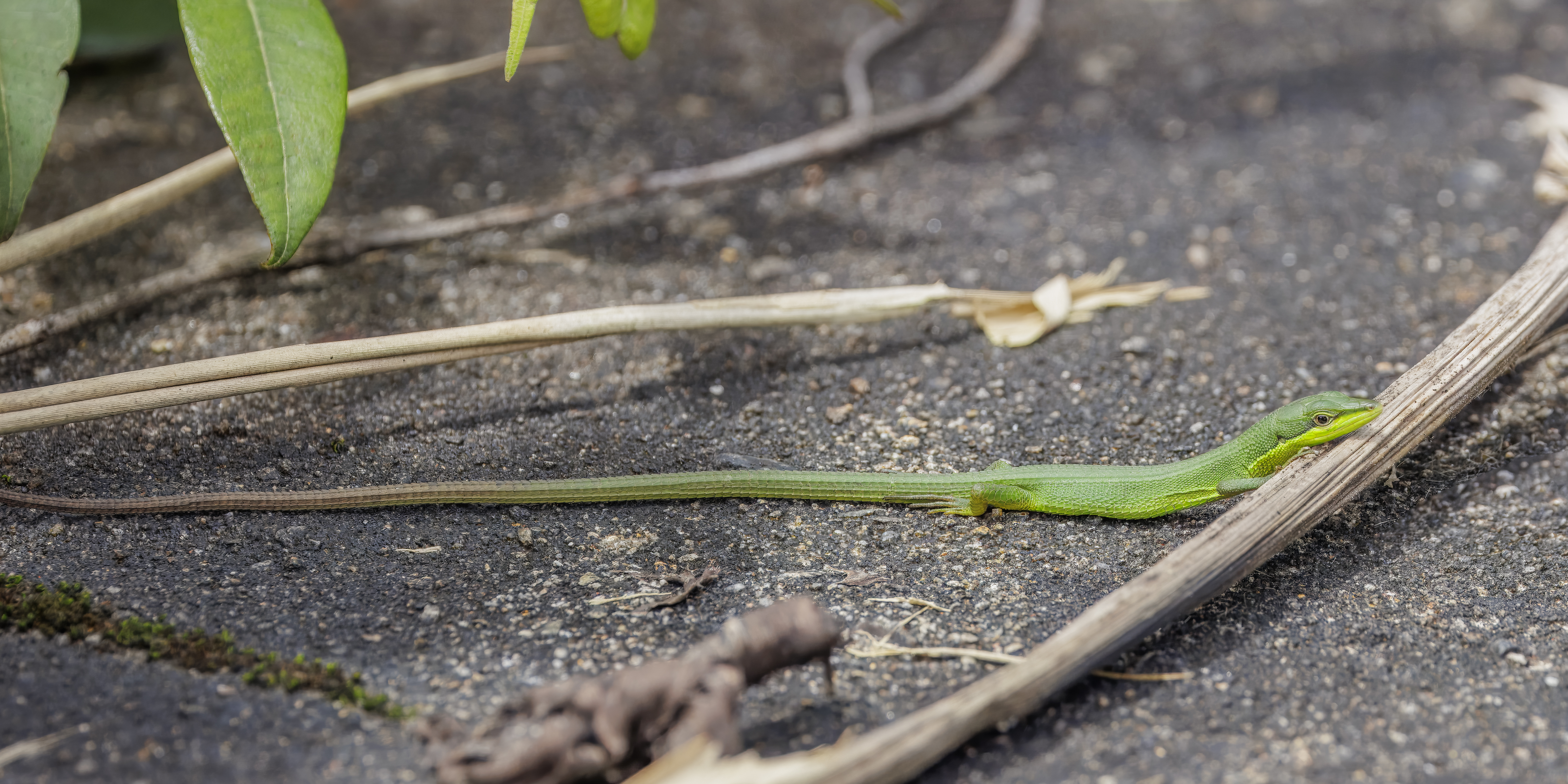
- Bach Ma National Park, Vietnam

Conservation status
- Least Concern (IUCN 3.1)

Scientific classification
- Kingdom: Animalia
- Phylum: Chordata
- Class: Reptilia
- Order: Squamata
- Family: Lacertidae
- Genus: Takydromus
- Species: T. hani

Binomial name
- Takydromus hani Chou, T.Q. Nguyen & Pauwels, 2001

= Takydromus hani =

Species of lizard

Takydromus hani, also known commonly as the green grass lizard, the southeast Asian green grass lizard, and the Vietnamese green grass lizard, is a species of lizard in the family Lacertidae. The species is endemic to Vietnam.

== Etymology ==
The specific name, hani, is in honor of Taiwanese architect Pao-the Han, who was the first Director of the National Museum of Natural Science in Taiwan.

== Habitat ==
The preferred natural habitat of T. hani is forest, at altitudes of 200–1,450 m (660–4,760 ft).

== Description ==
T. hani has the following characteristics: a single postnasal scale, 4 pairs of chin shields, 6 longitudinal rows of dorsal scales between the hind legs, no enlarged scales on sides of body, 8 rows of keeled ventral scales, 7 femoral pores on each side.

== Reproduction ==
T. hani is oviparous.
