= Tainan Wu Garden =

Garden in West Central, Tainan, Taiwan

- 臺南吳園
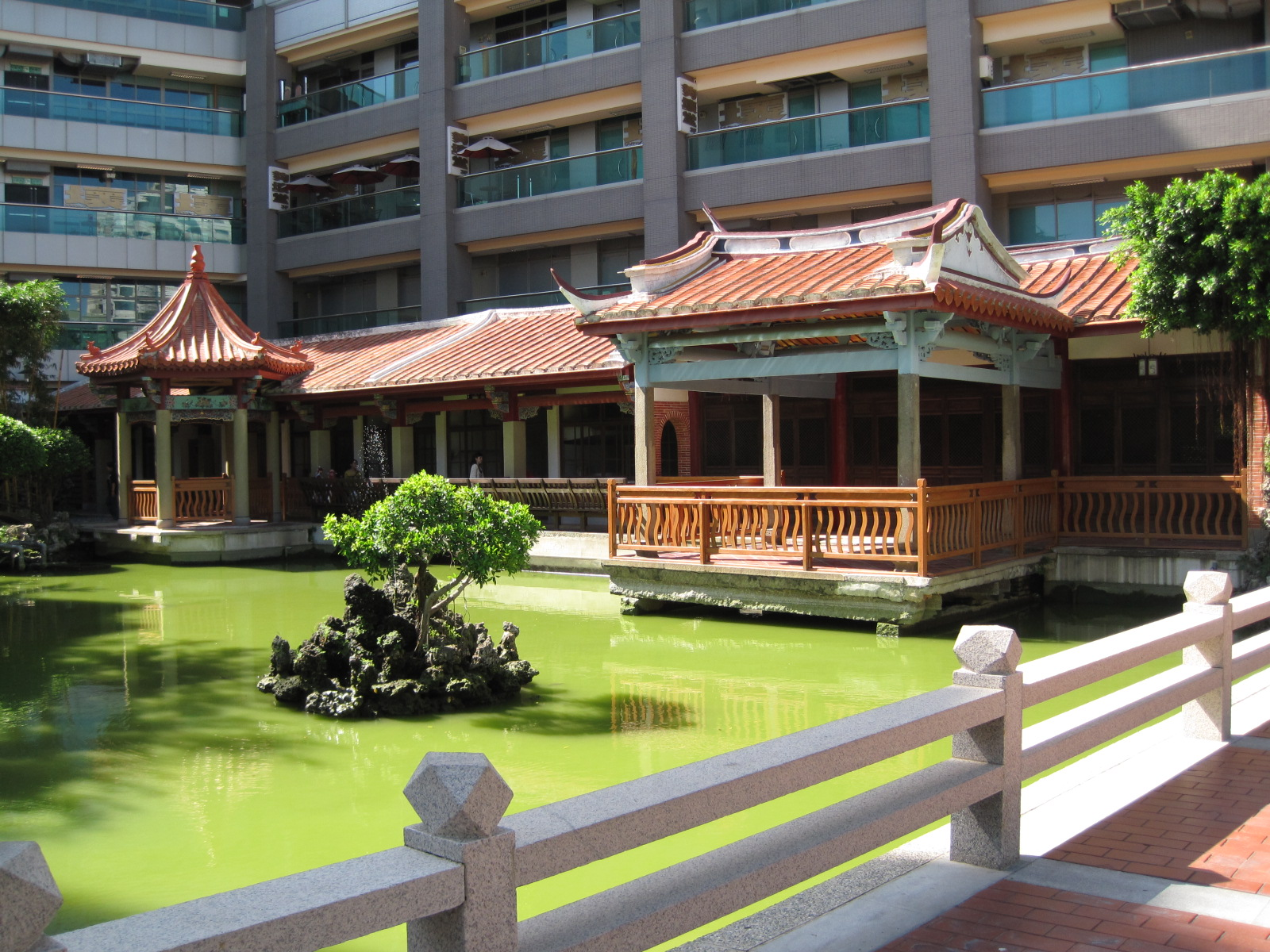
- The sole surviving waterside pavilion at Wu Garden; the multistory building to its rear is Far East Department Store Park Branch
- Interactive map of Tainan Wu Garden
- Type: Garden
- Location: West Central, Tainan, Taiwan
- Coordinates: 22°59′39″N 120°12′22″E
- Created: 1828

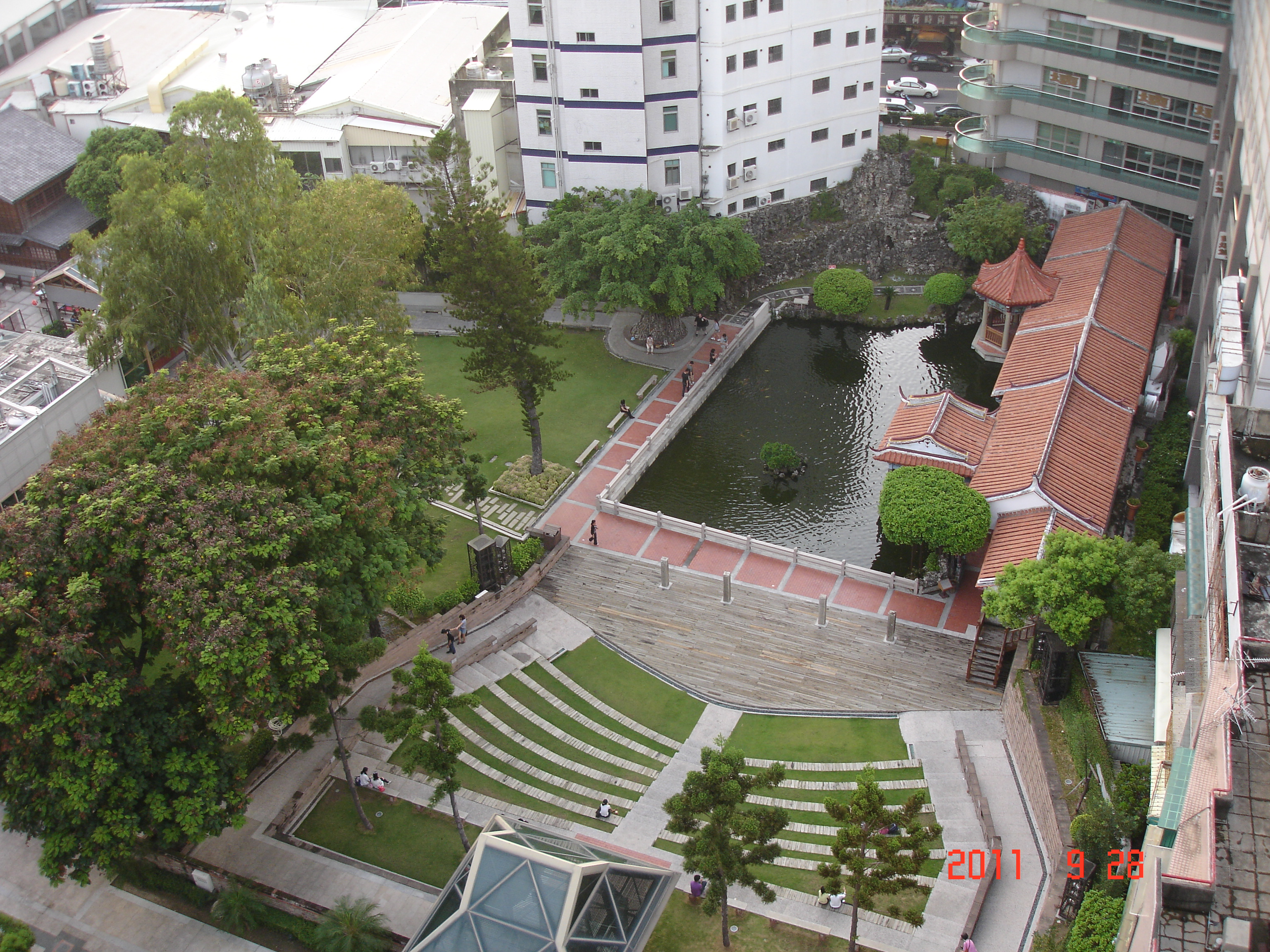
The grounds of Wu Garden

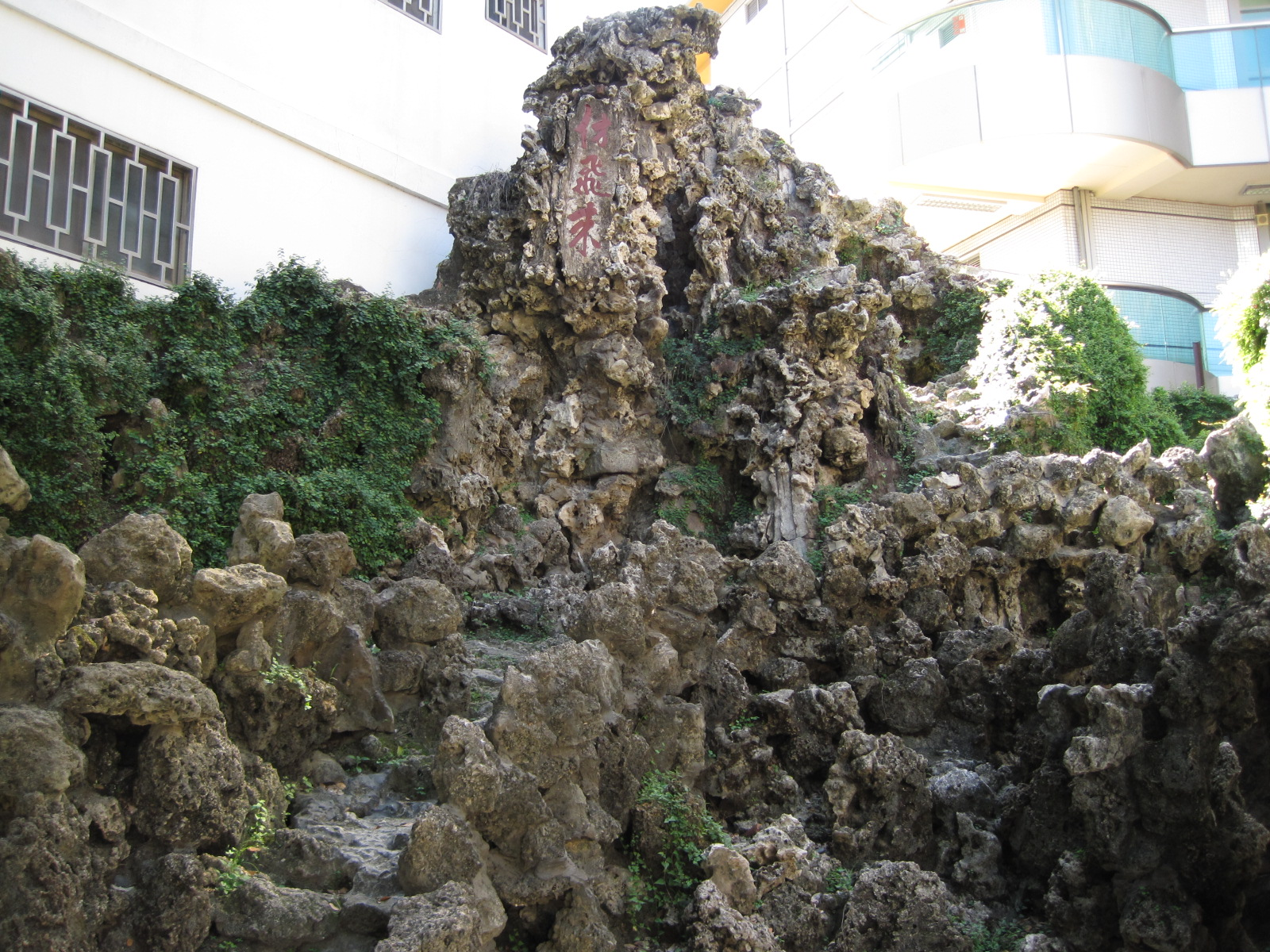
A rockery at Wu Garden.

Tainan Wu Garden (Chinese: 臺南吳園; pinyin: Táinán Wú Yuán), known at the time of its creation as "Purple Spring Garden (紫春園)," is located in West Central District, Tainan, Taiwan (once part of Tainan (府城)'s Pang-kiô-thâu (枋橋頭) area). Built by Wu Shangxin (吳尚新), the garden is known as one of the Four Great Gardens of Taiwan (台灣四大名園), along with Lin Family Mansion and Garden in Wufeng (霧峰萊園), Beiguo Garden in Hsinchu (新竹北郭園), and Lin Family Mansion and Garden in Banqiao (板橋林本源園邸),.

== History ==
Wu Garden was built around 1828 when salt magnate Wu Shangxin bought the garden of He Bin (何斌), an interpreter during the era of Dutch rule who played a role in the fall of Fort Zeelandia. At the time, it was also called "lâu-á lāi (樓仔內)". Alluding to the wealth of the Wu family, there was a local saying "Even if you have the wealth of lâu-á lāi, you don't own the estate of lâu-á lāi; even if you own the estate of lâu-á lāi, you don't have the wealth of lâu-á lāi 「有樓仔內的富，也無樓仔內的厝；有樓仔內的厝，也無樓仔內的富」".

During Japanese rule, when the fortunes of the Wu family began to decline, the garden was confiscated by Tainan Prefecture (臺南廳). In 1911, the Former Tainan Assembly Hall was constructed along the Garden's southern edge, as well as the then-famous Four Seasons Inn (四春園旅館) on its southeastern side, the Tainan Library (臺南圖書館) (in 1920) on its northwestern corner, and Tainan Municipal Swimming Pool (臺南市水浴場) (in 1922) on its northern edge. In 1974, the Four Seasons Inn, Tainan Library, and Tainan Municipal Bathhouse were sold to Far East Department Store, and now is the location of its Park Branch store.

In 1994, there was a proposal for commercial development on the garden's grounds, but the plans were dropped and the garden has been preserved to this day.

On September 9, 2018 (the 107th year of the Republic era), the "Wang Yude Memorial Hall" located in the waterside pavilion of Wu Garden was officially opened.

== See also ==
- Former Tainan Assembly Hall
