= Wufeng Lin Family Mansion and Garden =

Former residence in Wufeng, Taichung, Taiwan

Coordinates: 24°03′51″N 120°42′03″E

- Wufeng Lin Family Garden (霧峰林家花園)
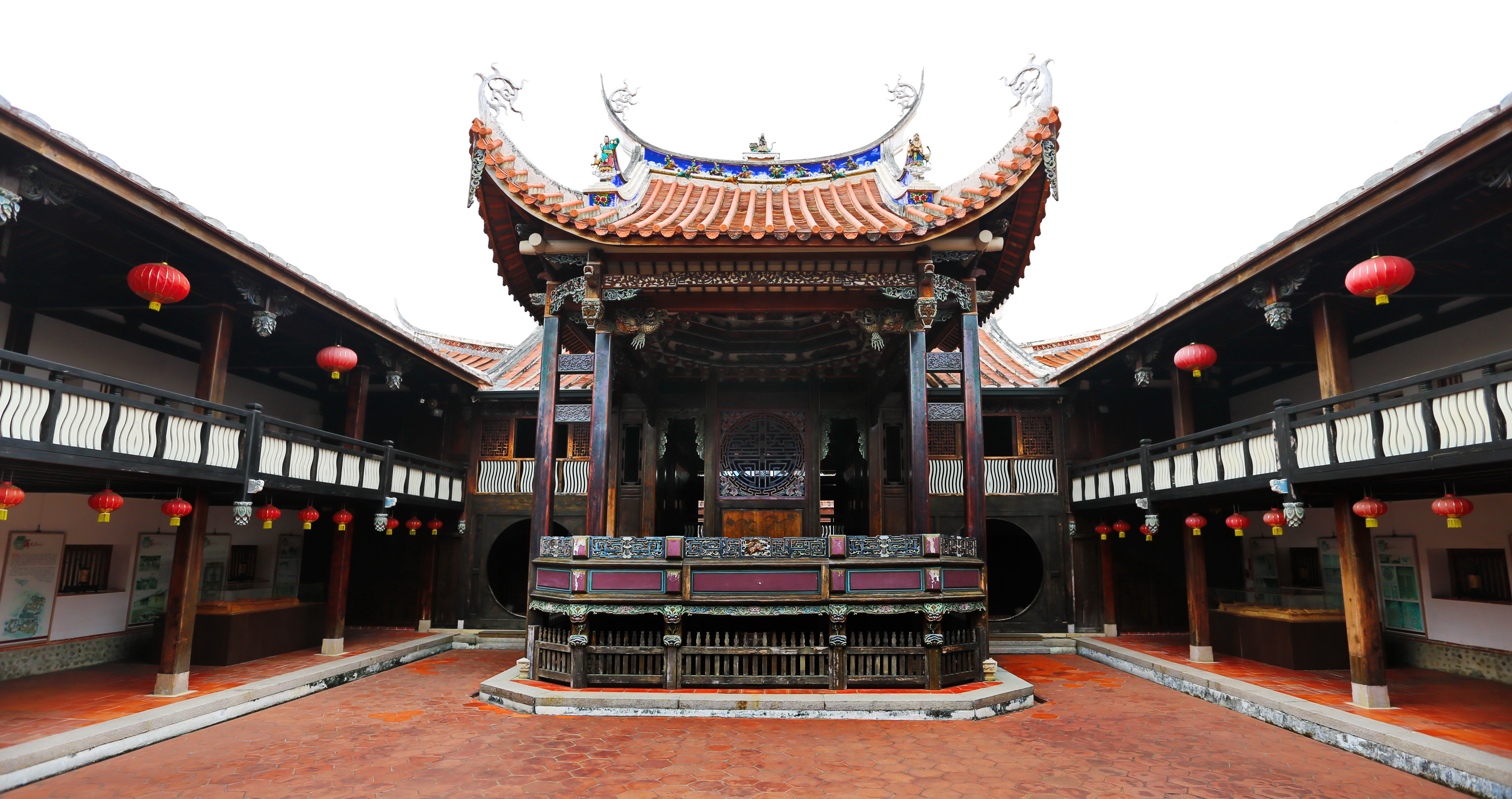
- The theatrical stage across from the Great Flower Hall (大花廳) in the Lower Mansion of Lin Family Residence (下厝)
- Interactive map of Wufeng Lin Family Mansion and Garden
- Location: Wufeng, Taichung, Taiwan Minsheng Road No. 42 and 28; Laiyuan Road No. 91

History
- Built: Tongzhi Year 3 (1864), Qing Dynasty

Site notes
- Current use: Currently under restoration

Wufeng Lin Family Mansion and Garden (Chinese: 霧峰林家宅園; pinyin: Wùfēng Lín Jiāzhái Yuán) is the former residence and grounds of the Wufeng Lin Family in Wufeng District, Taichung, Taiwan. Owing to the size of the Lin family clan, the vast site can be divided into two sections, the Upper (頂厝) and Lower (下厝) Mansions. The Lai Garden (萊園; Laiyuan) constructed by Lin Wenqin is commonly known as The Lin Family Garden (林家花園).

== Lin family mansion ==
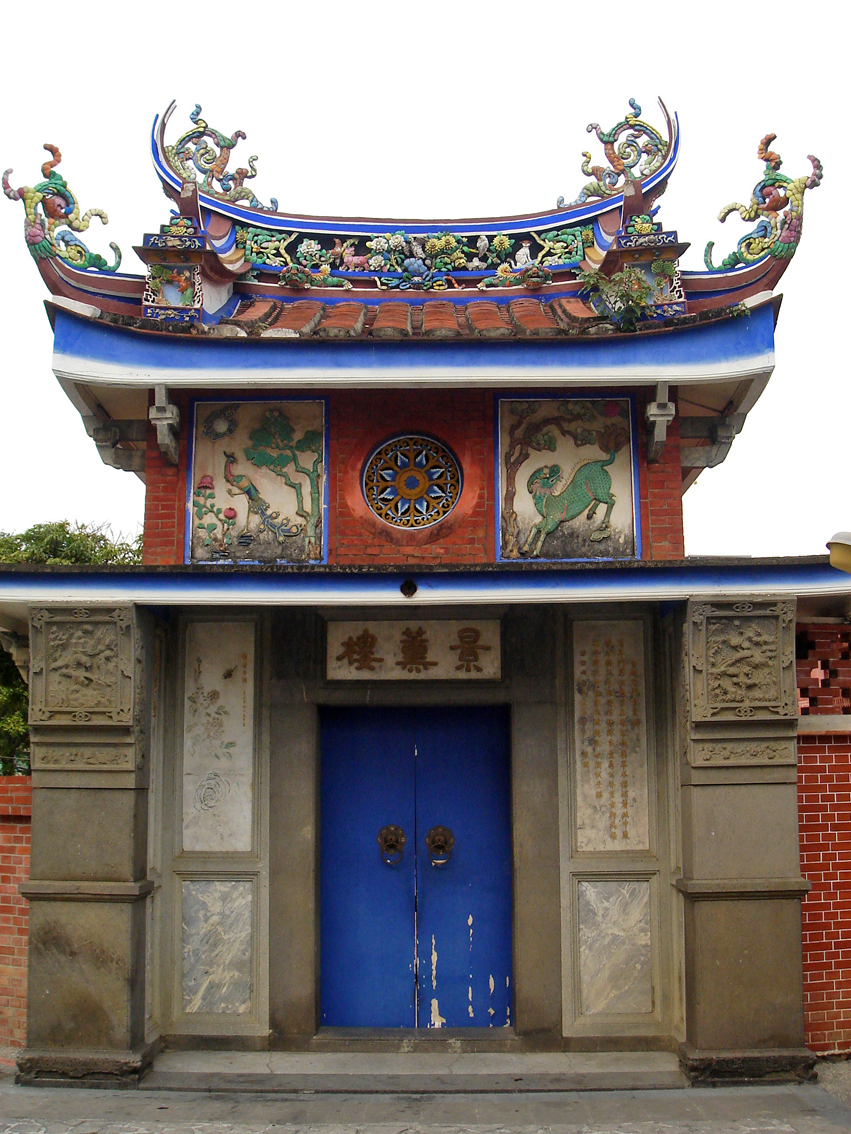
The Tower of Prospective Fragrance (景薰樓) in the Upper Mansion of Lin Family Residence (頂厝)

=== Upper Mansion (頂厝) ===
- The Hibiscus-Mirror Studio (蓉鏡齋): A sanheyuan (三合院) constructed of red kiln-baked bricks, it was rebuilt as the Hibiscus-Mirror Studio for use as a private school around 1887; the semicircular panchi (泮池) in the front courtyard was dug to resemble those in Confucian Temples.
- Tower of Prospective Fragrance Building Group (景薰樓組群): Work began sometime before 1864. The inner and outer wings of the first courtyard were completed in 1867, as well as the facade and the gatehouse to the Tower of Prospective Fragrance. The second courtyard was completed c.1883. The rear tower was completed in 1899.
- New House (新厝): In 1916, this addition was built along the southern facade of the third courtyard of the Tower of Prospective Fragrance Building Group.
- Nourishment Orchard (頤圃): Originally an earthen construction, it also served as a guest house and granary. In 1906, it was refitted as a pleasure ground.

=== Lower Mansion (下厝) ===
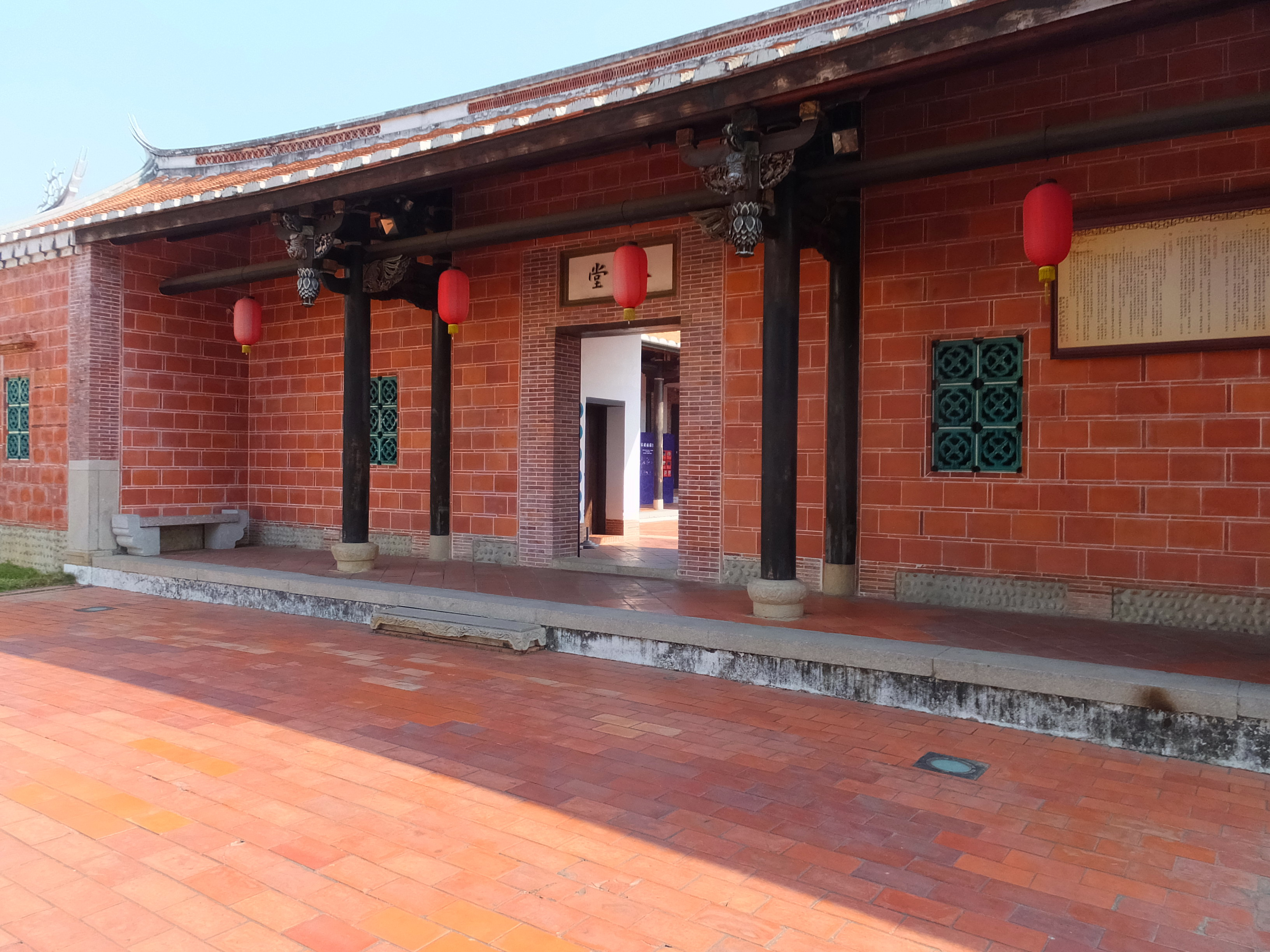
The Hall of Gongbaodi (宮保第)

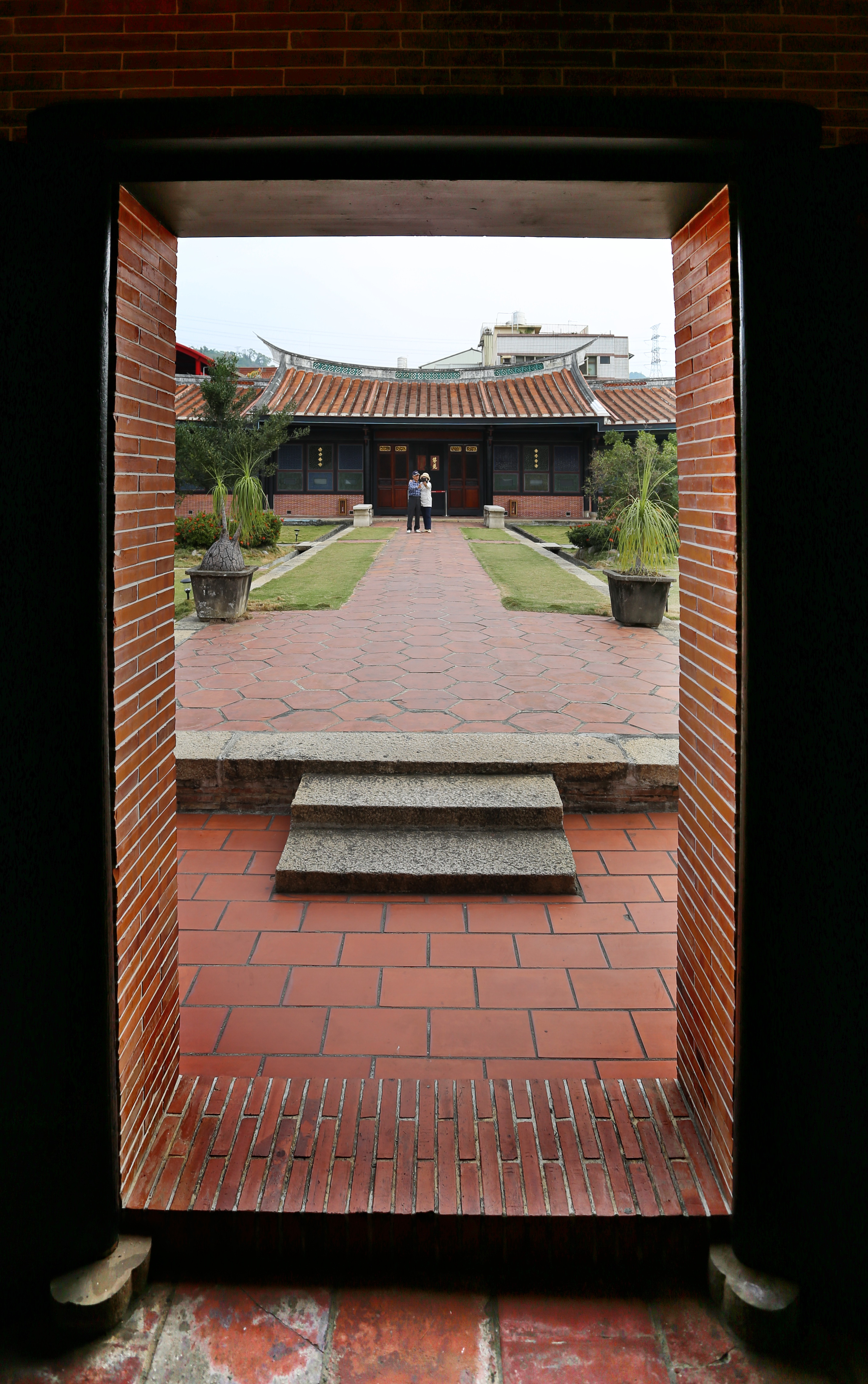
The courtyard of Gongbaodi

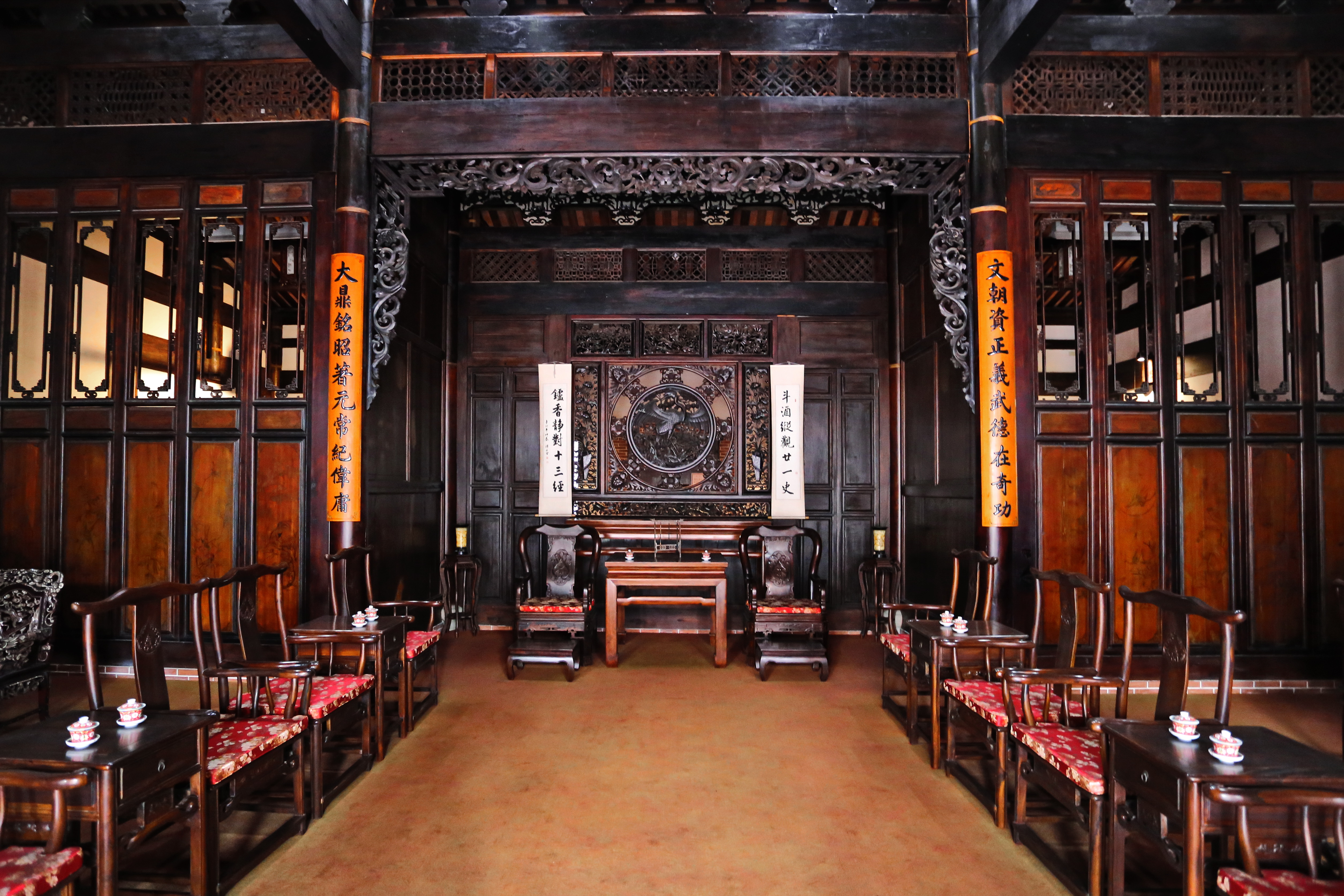
The Formal Living Room in the Great Flower Hall

- Caocuo (草厝): The earliest building in Lin Family Residence, originally a thatched sanheyuan built in 1837.
- Gongbaodi (宮保第): The central courtyard built by Lin Wencha during his enlarging of mansion in 1858, along with the facade, the left and right, inner and outer wings of the third courtyard following shortly afterward. His son, between 1870 and 1883, completed the mansion's addition with vestibules to the first and second courtyards. After Lin Wencha was killed in battle at Zhangzhou (漳州), the Qing court issued an edict, conferring upon him posthumously the title "Junior Guardian of the Crown Prince" (太子少保).
- Great Flower Hall (大花廳): This ceremonial hall, accompanied by an exquisite theatrical stage and outdoor seating, was used to host public banquets. Construction begun in 1890, completed c.1894.
- Erfangcuo (二房厝): Built between 1864 and 1870 as the residence for the second branch of the family.

== Laiyuan ==
Commonly known as the Lin Family Garden, The Lai Garden, along with the Wu Garden in Tainan, the Beiguo Garden in Hsinchu (新竹北郭園), and the Lin Family Mansion and Garden in Banqiao, are collectively known as The Four Great Gardens of Taiwan (台灣四大名園). In 1863, Lin Wenqin, having passed the County Examination, constructed Laiyuan on the foothills of Wufeng, and offered performances for the diversion of his mother, Madame Luo (羅太夫人). The name of the gardens derives from the story of the filial Old Master Lai (老萊子), who even after reaching 70 years of age, would still dress in gaudy clothing and entertain his elderly parents (彩衣娛親). Liang Qichao, during his 1911 stay in Taiwan, composed 20 poems extolling the scenery at Laiyuan, which would late become known as "Twenty Quatrains on Historic Laiyuan" (萊園名勝十二絕句). Laiyuan now serves as the campus of Taichung Ming Tai High School (臺中市私立明台高級中學).

=== The ten scenes of laiyuan (萊園十景) ===
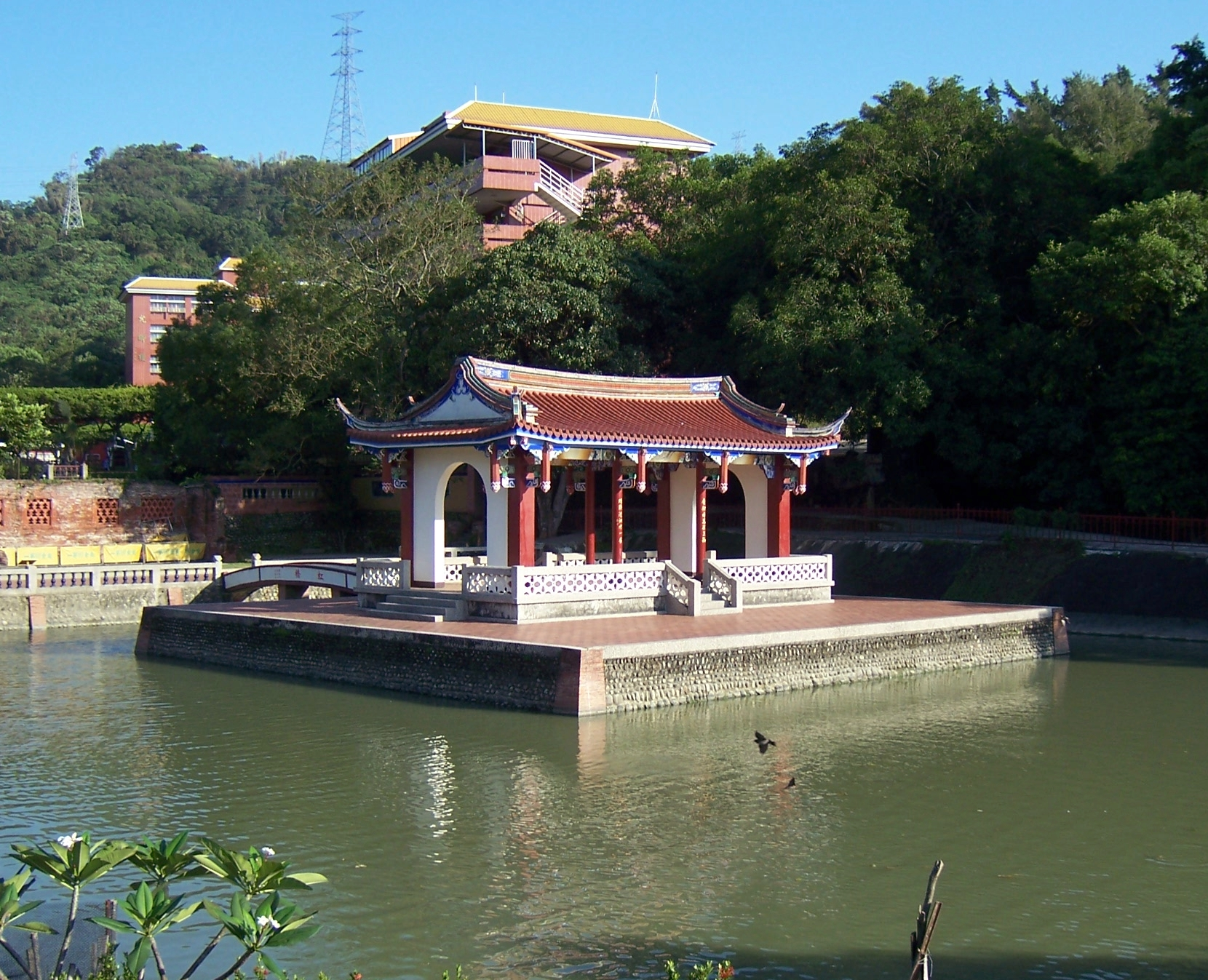
Flying Goblet Drunken Moon Pavilion (飛觴醉月亭) on Lychee Isle

- Cotton-tree Bridge (木棉橋): In the early days, a wooden bridge originally spanned Washerwoman's Stream(擣衣澗), leading to Laiyuan's entrance; deriving its name from the Ceiba trees (木棉) that surrounded it. In 1930(Showa 5), the bridge was rebuilt using cement。
- Washerwoman's Stream(擣衣澗)
- Five-Cassia Tower (五桂樓): Rebuilt in 1906, it is named after the five cassia trees in front of its gate. The first floor was used as a sitting room for Madame Luo (羅太夫人, Madame Lin Dianguo (林奠國夫人)), and the second as Madame Luo's (羅夫人) personal opera box. Liang Qichao stayed here during his time in Laiyuan.
- Pool of Small Habits (小習池)
- Lychee Isle (荔枝島): An earthen terrace built in the middle of the Pool of Small Habits, topped by a stage for 羅太夫人 to watch opera. Later rebuilt as Flying Goblet Drunken Moon Pavilion (飛觴醉月亭).
- Precipice of Myriad Cherry Trees (萬梅崦)
- Moon-viewing Peak (望月峰)
- Thousand-Step Trail (千步磴): A path leading to Moon-viewing Peak, also known as the Cloud-Traversing Trail「淩雲蹬」。
- Pavilion of Vesperal Beauty (夕佳亭)
- Veranda for Contemplating Nirvana (考槃軒)

=== Other attractions ===
- Iron Cannon Tablet (鐵砲碑): Erected by Lin Hsien-tang, and written by the jinshi Chen Wangzeng (陳望曾), commemorating the achievements of Lin Jiazu(林家祖): repelling the various gangs of the Dai Chaochun Affair (戴潮春事件), and attacking Azhaowu (阿罩霧)(Wufeng). According to legend, it originally possessed an iron cannon foil, but it has long since disappeared.
- Oak Poetry Society Name Tablet (櫟社名碑): A concrete monument erected in 1921 commemorating the twentieth anniversary of the establishment of the Oak Poetry Society.
- Laiyuan One-Family Stone (萊園一家石)
- Tablet Eulogizing Master Lin Zhushan (林竹山夫子頌德碑)
- The 36 Stairs (三十六台階)
- Lin Clan Ancestral Cemetery (林氏祖塋): Served as the family cemetery for the Upper House lineage of the Lin Clan, arranged in a large-scale Zhaomu (昭穆) system.
- The Stone Duke (石頭公)
- Bronze Statue of Lin Yunqing (林允卿)
- Oak Poetry Society Centennial Commemorative Bridge (櫟社百週年紀念橋)

== Post-1999 earthquake damage ==
During the 1999 Jiji earthquake (known as the "921 earthquake" in Taiwan), the building sustained heavy damage.

=== Upper house ===
- Tower of Prospective Fragrance Building Group
- Hibiscus-Mirror Studio: 80% damaged.
- New House: Completely destroyed.
- Nourishment Orchard: 70% damaged.

=== Lower house ===
- Grass House: Completely destroyed.
- Residence of the Palace Guard: 80% damaged.
- Hall of Large Flowers: Completely destroyed.
- Two-Roomed House: 65% damaged.

=== Reconstruction work ===
The Lin Family Residence, after having suffered through the 921 earthquake, was under the financial support of the Executive Yuan's 921 Rebuilding Committee (行政院九二一重建委員會), the Taichung County Cultural Bureau (already in conjunction with the Taichung Municipal Cultural Bureau) are currently finished with restoration and reconstructive work in five areas, respectively the Upper House's Tower of Prospective Fragrance (work completed) and Nourishment Orchard (already open), and the Lower House's Large Flower Hall (work completed), Residence of the Palace Guard (work completed), and the Two-roomed House (work completed). Work is currently undertaking on the restoration and reconstruction of the Upper House's Hibiscus-mirror Studio, the Lower House's Grass House, and Laiyuan's Five-Cassia Tower.

== See also ==
- Wufeng Lin Family
- Taichung Park
- Attabu 2 (2015 film about the family)
