= Hiroshi Kato =

Japanese footballer and manager

Hiroshi Kato 加藤 寛
Personal information
- Full name: Hiroshi Kato
- Date of birth: January 29, 1951 (age 75)
- Place of birth: Kume District, Okayama, Japan

Youth career
- 1967–1969: Kobe Fukiai High School

College career
Years	Team	Apps	(Gls)
1970–1973	Osaka University of Health and Sport Sciences		

Managerial career
- 1997: Vissel Kobe
- 2004: Vissel Kobe

Hiroshi Kato (加藤 寛, Katō Hiroshi; born January 29, 1951) is a former Japanese football player and manager.

== Coaching career ==
Kato was born in Kume District, Okayama on January 29, 1951. He joined Vissel Kobe in 1995, and he managed youth team. In October 1997, top team manager Stuart Baxter was sacked end of 1997 season. Kato managed the club as caretaker in Emperor's Cup in December. In 2004, manager Ivan Hašek resigned in September and Kato became a new manager in October. He managed 7 matches until end of 2004 season.

== Managerial statistics ==
Team	From	To	Record				
Team	From	To	G	W	D	L	Win %
Vissel Kobe	2004	2004	7	4	1	2	57.14
Total			7	4	1	2	57.14
