= Korokurō Shimomura =

Japanese educator and writer (1884–1955)

- 下村虎六郎
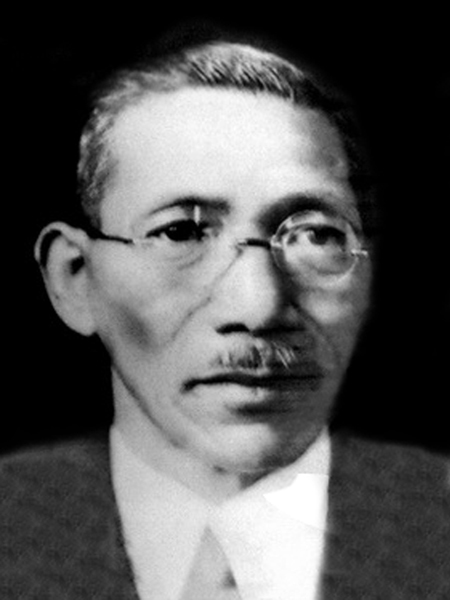
- Korokurō Shimomura
- Born: Torokurō Uchida; October 3, 1884; Chitose Village, Kanzaki District, Saga Prefecture, Empire of Japan
- Died: April 20, 1955 (aged 70); Hyakuninchō, Shinjuku, Tokyo, Japan
- Other names: Kojin Shimomura, Torajin Shimomura
- Education: Tokyo Imperial University
- Occupations: Educator, writer

Korokurō Shimomura (Japanese: 下村虎六郎, 3 October 1884 – 20 April 1955), better known by his pen name Kojin Shimomura (下村湖人), was a Japanese educator, novelist, essayist, and social thinker. He served as principal of Taichū First Middle School (now Taichung First Senior High School) in Japanese Taiwan and later principal of Taihoku Higher School. He was known for his educational philosophy, liberal humanism, and criticism of Japanese militarism during the early Shōwa period.

== Early life and education ==
Shimomura was born as Torokurō Uchida in Chitose Village, Kanzaki District, Saga Prefecture, Japan. He graduated from the Department of English Literature at Tokyo Imperial University in 1909.

While still a student, he published poems and essays under the pen name Uchida Yūan (内田夕闇). Following graduation, he taught at Saga Middle School and later became principal of Kashima Middle School in Saga Prefecture.

== Career ==
In 1925, Shimomura moved to Taiwan, then under Japanese rule, to become principal of Taichū First Middle School (present-day Taichung First Senior High School).

In 1929, he was appointed vice principal of Taihoku Higher School, later becoming its principal. He resigned from the post in 1931 and returned to Japan, where he worked for the Dai Nippon Rengō Seinen-dan (Greater Japan Federation of Youth Associations) as an advisor, training director, and head of its educational institute.

After retirement, he devoted himself to public lectures and writing.

== Thought and legacy ==
Writing under the pen name Kojin Shimomura, he became widely known in Japanese educational circles. His works emphasized personal cultivation, moral education, and civic responsibility.

Shimomura was also noted for his liberal and anti-war views. During the Second World War, he was among a relatively small number of Japanese intellectuals who expressed criticism of militarism. These ideas are reflected in works such as Jirō Monogatari and Rongo Monogatari.

== Selected works ==
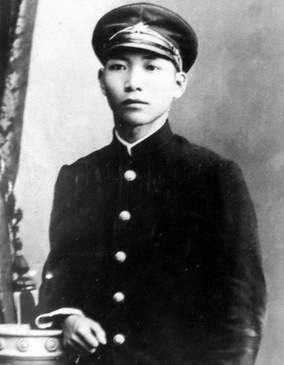
Korokurō Uchida during his student years

=== As Uchida Yūan (内田夕闇) ===
- Hiiragi-ba (『冬青葉』), poetry collection, Shinseisha, 1933.

=== As Korokurō Shimomura / Torajin Shimomura ===
- Jinsei o Kataru (『人生を語る』; Speaking About Life), Taibunkan, 1933.
- Kyōikuteki Hansei (『教育的反省』; Educational Reflections), Taibunkan, 1934.
- Bonjindō (『凡人道』; The Way of Ordinary People), Nihon Seinenkan, 1934.
- Shinri ni Ikiru (『真理に生きる』; Living in Truth), Taibunkan, 1935.
- Tamashii wa Ayumu (『魂は歩む』; The Soul Moves Forward), Taibunkan, 1936.

=== As Kojin Shimomura (下村湖人) ===
- Ningen Seikatsu no Igi (『人間生活の意義』; The Meaning of Human Life), Satō Shinkō Seikatsukan, 1937.
- Rongo Monogatari (『論語物語』; Stories from the Analects), Dai Nippon Yūbenkai Kōdansha, 1938.
- Jiko Hyōgen to Hōshi (『自己表現と奉仕』; Self-Expression and Service), Taibunkan, 1940.
- Jukufū Kyōiku to Kyōdō Seikatsu Kunren (『塾風教育と協同生活訓練』), Sanyūsha, 1940.
- Shūdō Yawa (『修道夜話』), Taibunkan, 1941.
- Satō Nobuhiro (『佐藤信淵』), Dai Nippon Yūbenkai Kōdansha, 1942.
- Seishōnen no Tame ni (『青少年のために』; For Young People), Koyama Shoten, 1943.
- Shinsōki (『心窓記』), Kairyūdō, 1943.
- Kemuri Nakama (『煙仲間』), Kaiseisha, 1943.
- Wakaki Kensetsusha (『若き建設者』; Young Builders), Daiichi Shobō, 1943.
- Warera no Seigan (『我等の誓願』), Koyama Shoten, 1944.
- Kyōiku no Shin Rinen to Nōson Bunka (『教育の新理念と農村文化』), Nikkō Shoin, 1947.
- Jirō Monogatari (『次郎物語』; The Story of Jirō), Vols. 1–4, Koyama Shoten, 1947–1949.
- Mezame Yuku Kora (『眼ざめ行く子ら』), Kaijū Shoten, 1951.
- Shōnen no Tame no Jirō Monogatari (『少年のための次郎物語』), Vols. 1–2, Gakudōsha, 1951–1952.
- Jinsei Zuisō: Shinsō Kyorai (『人生随想 心窓去来』), Kōfūkan, 1951.
- Gendaiyaku Rongo (『現代訳論語』; Modern Translation of the Analects), Ikeda Shoten, 1954.
- Seinen no Shisaku no Tame ni (『青年の思索のために』), Shinchō Bunko, 1955.
- Rinjin (『隣人』), collected works editions published by Ikeda Shoten and Kokudosha.
- Kojin Shimomura Zenshū (『下村湖人全集』), 18 vols., Ikeda Shoten, 1955–1957.
- Kojin Shimomura Zenshū (new edition), 10 vols., Ikeda Shoten, 1965.
- Kono Hito o Miyo: Tazawa Giho no Shōgai (『この人を見よ―田澤義鋪の生涯』), Tazawa Giho Kenshōkai, 1966.
- Kojin Shimomura Zenshū, 10 vols., Kokudosha, 1975–1976.
- Yoshikawa Shutsuzen (ed.), Kojin Shimomura Zen Tanka Shūsei (『下村湖人全短歌集成』), Ikeda Shoten, 2004.

== Sources ==
- Dictionary of Taiwan History (in Chinese).
- Shimomura Kōjin. Shimomura Kōjin Zenshū (in Japanese).
- "Shimomura Kōjin: List of Works". Aozora Bunko.
- "Birthplace of Shimomura Kōjin". Tokyo Shimbun. Archived from the original on 2004-12-15.
- "Origins of the Japanese Youth Hostel Movement".
