= The Taiwan Folkways =

Magazine of Taiwan

The Taiwan Folkways (traditional Chinese: 台灣風物; simplified Chinese: 台湾风物; pinyin: Táiwān Fēngwù) is a Taiwanese magazine.

Established by Chen Han-kuang, a retired Republic of China Armed Forces officer, the first issue of The Taiwan Folkways was published on 31 December 1951. The Taiwan Folkways was inspired by Minzoku Taiwan, a Japanese era magazine, in several facets, including editorial style, cover design, and illustration style. Several writers for Minzoku Taiwan began writing for The Taiwan Folkways. Chen hired Yang Yun-ping, who had worked with Minzoku Taiwan, as editor in chief. Yang remained editor until December 1952, and was subsequently succeeded by Kuo Hsun-feng, Lu Chung-ying and Niu Hsien-min. Lin Chung-chih of the Lin Ben Yuan Family became editor in 1966. Chang Yen-hsien has also served as editor.

The Taiwan Folkways discussed Taiwanese culture and Taiwan studies, topics that garnered strict attention from the government during the White Terror. The publication was once suspended by the government for two months and changed its name several times in the mid-1950s. The Taiwan Folkways remained a monthly publication through August 1961. It was published every two months starting in October 1961, and since 1969 has been a quarterly publication. The Taiwan Folkways is now the longest-running non-governmental publication in Taiwan.
