= Lin Ming-cheng =

Taiwanese banker

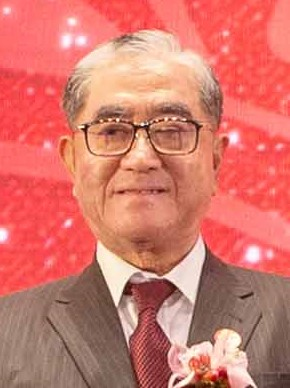
- Born: 林明成; 3 January 1943 (age 83); Taihoku Prefecture, Japanese Taiwan (now Banqiao District, New Taipei City, Taiwan)
- Education: National Chengchi University (BA, LLB); Keio University (LLM)
- Occupation: Banker
- Spouse: 林颜绚美
- Children: 4
- Parent(s): Lin Hsiung-cheng (father)
- Relatives: Lin family from Banciao

Lin Ming-cheng (Chinese: 林明成; Pe̍h-ōe-jī: Lîm Bêng-sêng; born on 3 January 1943, Itabashi Town, Kaizan District, Taihoku Prefecture, Japanese Taiwan (modern-day Banqiao District)) is a Taiwanese banker who is a member of the seventh generation of the Lin family from Banciao, one of the richest families of Taiwan. He is the only son of Lin Hsiung-cheng and a grandson of Lin Erh-kang. In June 2008, Forbes magazine ranked him as the 20th-richest person in Taiwan. He is serving as the vice chairman of Hua Nan Financial Holdings, and the director of Hua Nan Bank of China.
