= Han Pao-teh =

Taiwanese architect (1934-2014)

- 漢寶德
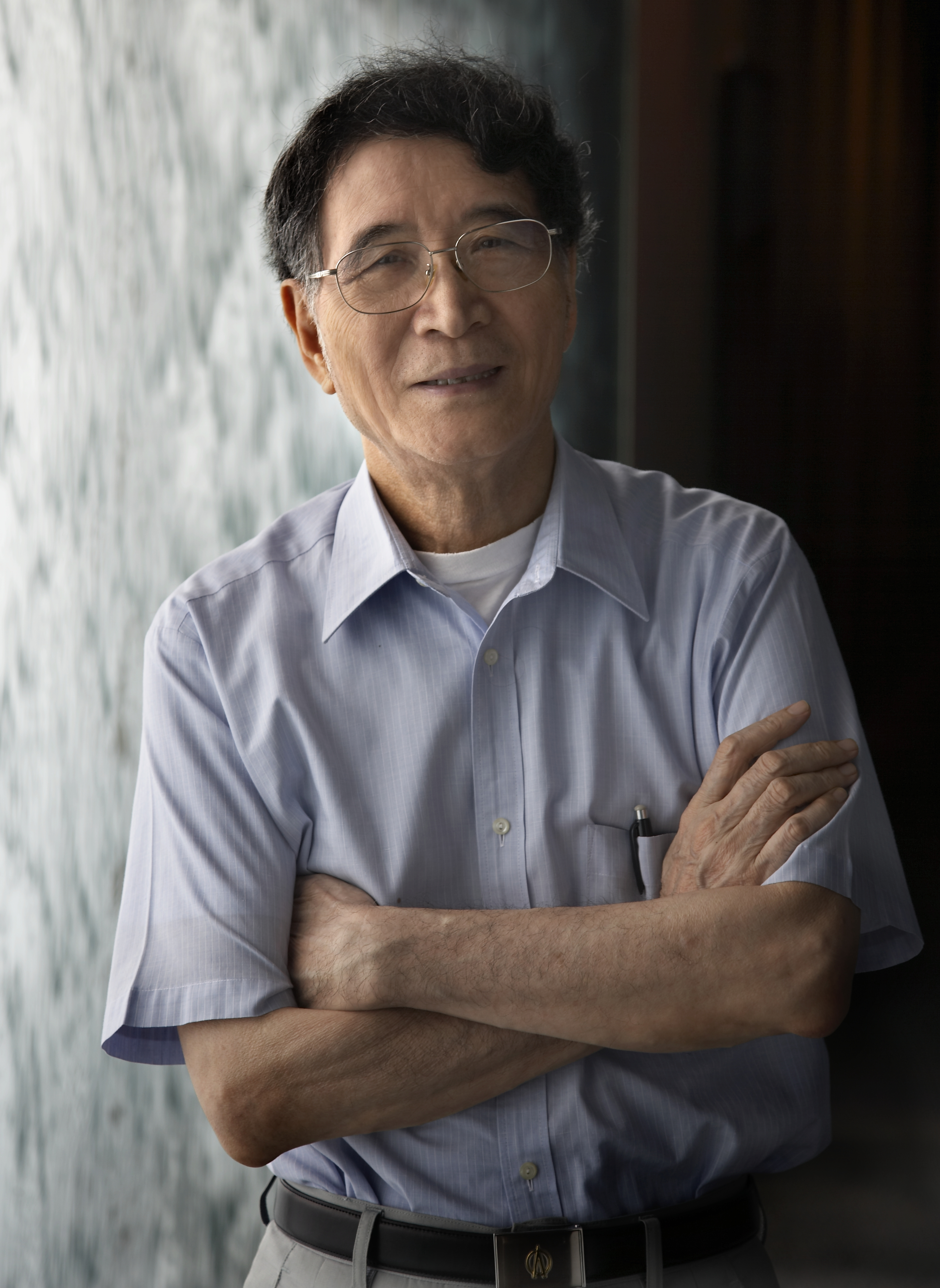
- Han in 2006
- Born: 19 August 1934; Shandong, China
- Died: 20 November 2014 (aged 80); Taipei, Taiwan
- Education: National Cheng Kung University (BS); Harvard University (MArch); Princeton University (MFA)
- Occupation: Architect
- Spouse(s): Sharon Hsiao Han 蕭中行 (m.1965- died 1995) Nina Sun 孫寧瑜 (m. 1999)
- Children: Karen Han 漢可凡; Joseph Han 漢述祖
- Awards: Education Culture Medal; National Cultural Heritage Preservation Award; National Award for the Arts in Architecture; Executive Yuan National Cultural Award Medal

Han Pao-teh (Chinese: 漢寶德; pinyin: Hàn Bǎodé; Pe̍h-ōe-jī: Hàn Pó-tek; 19 August 1934 – 20 November 2014) was a Taiwanese architect, educator, scholar, writer, museum curator and calligrapher.

== Early life and education ==
Han was born on August 19, 1934, in Shandong, China. His family fled the Second Sino-Japanese War and, following the outbreak of the Chinese Civil War, ultimately moved to Taiwan during the Great Retreat in 1949. After migrating through Qingdao and Zhoushan, they settled in Zuoying, Kaohsiung, then moved to Penghu.

Han studied architecture at National Cheng Kung University and graduated with a Bachelor of Science (B.S.) in 1958. As a senior undergraduate, he founded an architectural design magazine, Shutters (百葉窗), dedicated to traditional Taiwanese architecture and, after graduation, worked as a teaching assistant at Cheng Kung. He then won a full scholarship to complete graduate studies in the United States at Harvard University, where he earned a Master of Architecture (M.Arch.) from the Harvard Graduate School of Design in 1965. In 1967, he also earned a Master of Fine Arts (M.F.A.) in history and architecture from Princeton University.

== Career ==
Han was invited to return to Taiwan in 1967, and was appointed the Chair of the Department of Architecture at Tunghai University in Taichung, where he introduced a new system of education during his 10-year tenure. He was the Dean of the College of Science and Engineering at National Chung Hsing University from 1977 to 1981. In the late 70's he was credited to be the pioneer in the movement for the preservation of historic buildings in Taiwan . He personally researched and directed the restoration projects of many important historical landmarks, including Changhua Confucius Temple , Lukang Longshan Temple , and the Lin Family Mansion in Banqiao. Records and slides of his restoration projects including research and documentation are in the archives of the Department of Architecture at Tunghai University. For his contribution in Taiwanese architecture and architectural education, he was awarded the 2006 National Award for the Arts in Architecture .

During 1981–1986, Han Pao-teh was appointed by the Executive Yuan to lead the preparation and design of National Museum of Natural Science in Taichung. This is the first museum of its kind in Taiwan. He was appointed by the Ministry of Education to be its first director from 1986 to 1995. In 1994, he was awarded the Education-Culture Medal, highest honor from the Education Ministry of the Executive Yuan.

In 1993, Han Pao-teh was appointed by the Ministry of Education to design, build and establish Tainan National University of the Arts (TNNUA). He served as the first president/chancellor of TNNUA 1996–2000, and elected program chair of the graduate school of Museum Studies in 1996.

After his retirement from TNNUA in 2000, Han Pao-teh was invited by the Ling Jiou Mountain Buddhist Foundation to be the first director and curator of the Museum of World Religions.

During 1998–2001, he was also the director of National Culture and Arts Foundation . A prolific author and columnist, he published over 40 books. Majority of his hand written drafts can be found in the archives of the Taiwan National Central Library.

As an accomplished Chinese Calligrapher, he had multiple personal exhibitions in museums and galleries in Taiwan, including three solo exhibitions at the National Museum of History in 2005, 2014 and 2024 .

Han Pao-teh was appointed national policy advisor of President Chen Shui-bian 2000-2008, and presidential advisor, the Geheimrat to President Ma Ying-jeuo from 2008 until his death in 2014.

Han Pao-teh died in Taipei, Taiwan, on 20 November 2014. He was posthumously given the Executive Yuan National Cultural Award, the nation's highest honor for persons with great contribution to art and culture of Taiwan.

Han is commemorated in the scientific name of a species of Vietnamese lizard, Takydromus hani.

Han Pao-teh Memorial Museum was commissioned by his family and designed by his student Kris Yao at the Tainan National University of the Arts.

== Selected works of architecture ==
- Tiansiang Youth Activity Center (1978), Taroko Gorge, Hualien County
- Changhua Cultural Center (1981), Changhua County
- Kengting Youth Activity Center (1983), Kenting
- Penghu Youth Activity Center (1984)
- Institute of Ethnology (1985), Academia Sinica
- Hsinchu Nan Yuan (South Garden) (1985) - Jiangnan-style architecture and landscaped gardens in Hsinpu, Hsinchu County, hosted Mikhail Gorbachev and Margaret Thatcher as guests of Wang Ti-wu, founder of United Daily News (UDN).
- Tainan National University of the Arts (1996)
- Industrial Technology Research Institute (ITRI) Headquarters in Hsinchu (1996)
- Green Island White Terror Memorial Park Human Rights Monument (1999)

== Major publications ==
- Han Pao-Teh, Han Pao-Teh's Narrative about Cultures, Artouch, 2006. ISBN 986-7519-84-1.
- Han Pao-Teh, A Walk in European Architectures, Ecus Publishing House, 2005.
- Han Pao-Teh, The Memoir of Han Pao-Teh, Book Zoom, 2004. ISBN 957-621-909-4.
- Han Pao-Teh, Han Pao-Teh's Narrative about Aestheticism, Linkingbooks, 2004. ISBN 957-08-2703-3.
- Han Pao-Teh, Expatiating on Architecture, Hebei Education Press, 2003. ISBN 7-5434-5034-8.
- Han Pao-Teh, Looking into Architecture, Artbook, 2002. ISBN 986-7957-40-7.
- Han Pao-Teh, Exhibition Planning: Theory and Practice, Archi, 2000. ISBN 957-8440-98-7.
- Han Pao-Teh, Recent Reflections on Architecture and Culture, National Museum of History, 1995. ISBN 957-00-5923-0.
- Han Pao-Teh, The Story of Chinese Landscape Design: External Forms and Internal Visions, Art Media Resources, Ltd., 1992. ISBN 978-957-530-356-3.
- Han Pao-Teh, Museum Management, Garden City Publishers, 1990. ISBN 957-8440-96-0.
- Han Pao-Teh, The Spiritual Dimensions of Architecture, Architecture Informations, 1971. ISBN 957-0454-31-8.
- Han Pao-Teh, Architecture, Society and Culture, Architecture Informations, 1971. ISBN 957-0454-11-3.

== Major solo exhibitions ==
- Legacy From the South: Han Pao-Teh, 01/27/2026 - 05/03/2026, Tainan Art Museum, Tainan, Taiwan. Curated by Tainan National University of the Arts. Co-sponsored by National Museum of Science, National History Museum, National Taiwan Museum.
- Han Pao-Teh's Architecture & Calligraphy Expression, 06/05/2025 - 12/31/2025, Han Pao-Teh Memorial Museum, Tainan National University of the Arts, Tainan, Taiwan. Co-sponsored by the Ministry of Education, National Taiwan Museum, National Museum of History.
- The Wold of Calligraphy Art-- Han Pao-Teh's modern expression, 11/30/2024 - 02/23/2025, National Museum of History, National Taiwan Craft Research and Development Institute, Taipei, Taiwan.
- The Architecture of Han Pao-Teh: Form, Color and Texture of Beauty, 11/29/2024 - 02/23/2025, National Taiwan Museum, Main Xianyang Building, Taipei, Taiwan.
- Highlights of Mr. Han, 11/20/2024 - 12/29/2024, Museum of World Religions, New Taipei City, Taiwan.
- Building Humane Worlds: A retrospective on Han Pao-Teh, 10/24/2014 - 12/07/2014, National Museum of History, Taipei, Taiwan.
- Chinese Calligraphy Exhibition by Han Pao-Teh, 06/25/2008 - 09/30/2008, Museum of World Religions, New Taipei City, Taiwan.
- Mild but Tasteful: A dialogue with Han Pao-Teh, 06/20/2007 - 07/22/2007, National Museum of History, Taipei, Taiwan.
