= Lin Family Mansion and Garden =

- 林本源園邸
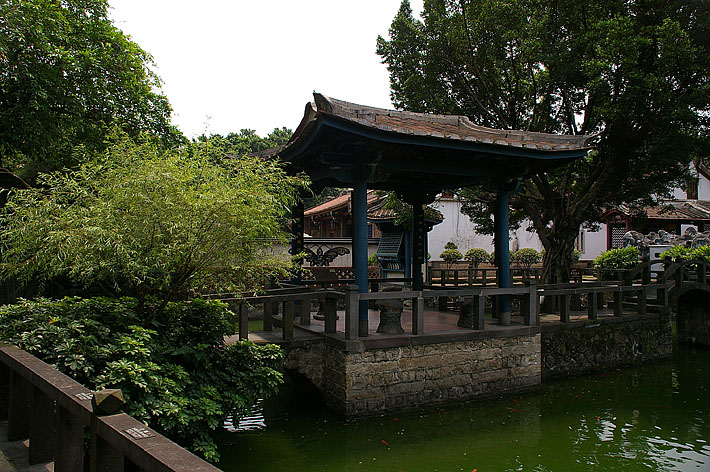
- Interactive map of the Lin Family Mansion and Garden area

General information
- Type: Mansion, garden
- Location: Banqiao, New Taipei, Taiwan
- Coordinates: 25°00′37″N 121°27′20″E
- Completed: 1847

Technical details
- Floor area: 500 m^{2}
- Grounds: 20,000 m^{2}

Design and construction
- Developer: Lin Ben Yuan Family

The Lin Ben Yuan Family Mansion and Garden (Chinese: 林本源園邸; pinyin: Lín Běn Yuán Yuándǐ) in Banqiao District, New Taipei City, Taiwan was a residence built by the Lin Ben Yuan Family. It is Taiwan's most complete surviving example of traditional Chinese garden architecture. The Lin Family Mansion and Garden — along with the Tainan Wu Garden, Hsinchu Beiguo Garden (新竹北郭園), and Wufeng Lin Family Mansion and Garden — are collectively known as the Four Great Gardens of Taiwan (台灣四大名園). This residence can be traced back to 1847, at the time a "rent house" for the Lin Ben Yuan family in the north. It was later expanded by the brothers Lin Guohua and Lin Guofang, becoming the residence of the Lin Ben Yuan family. Currently, the Lin Family Mansion and Garden is under the joint responsibility of the Executive Yuan Cultural Construction Committee, Ministry of the Interior, Ministry of Transportation and Communications Tourism Bureau, Taiwan Provincial Government, and the New Taipei City Government for protection and restoration work, who have additionally designated it as a Class-2 Historical Site.

The Lin Family Mansion and Garden has a surface area of approximately 20,000 square metres (4.9 acres). The garden is also referred to as the Banqiao Lin Family Garden (板橋林家花園). The Three-Courtyard Mansion to the west of the garden belongs to the Lin Family Sacrificial Trade Association. It is necessary to have a tour guide lead to enter the mansion's interior.

== History ==
An ancestor of the Lin Ben Yuan family, Lin Yingyin (林應寅), arrived in Taiwan in 1778, initially settling in the Xinzhuang area. Afterward, his son Lin Pinghou (林平侯) sold rice to earn a living. Through this, he was able to gain a fortune, bought up a large quantity of arable land, and established the future Lin Ben Yuan family fortune.

Up to between 1846 and 1848, to make the storing of rent crop more convenient, Lin Pinghou's third son, Lin Guohua, and fifth son, Lin Guofang, built Biyiguan (弼益館) in the Banqiao area as a "rent house" (租館). This building had a surface area of roughly 150 ping (500 square metres or 5,400 square feet), with a uniquely shaped, quadrangular courtyard, sporting pavilions on its front and back, and served as a center for the collection of rent crop.

In 1851, the Lin Ben Yuan family clan moved to Banqiao. The same year they constructed the Three-Courtyard Mansion (三落大厝) to serve as the family's residence. At the time, immigrants from Zhangzhou and Quanzhou were at arms with each another. Due to its wealth and power, the Lin Ben Yuan family became the main leaders of the Zhangzhou immigrants, and the mansion became their erstwhile headquarters. Because of this, the mansion incorporated a number of defensive designs, and several hundred militiamen were stationed there to stand guard. This lasted until the start of the Japanese occupation of Taiwan in 1895.

After 1949, the Lin Family Garden was lent by the head of the Lin household to the government to temporarily shelter soldiers from the mainland. In 1977, the Lin Ben Yuan family donated a portion of the garden to the government of Taipei County (now New Taipei). Occupied by squatters, the gardens were in disarray. It took years of city planning to relocate over 125 families. Research and restoration was conducted by a team led by Han Pao-teh. Construction began in 1982, and it opened to the public on Jan 1, 1987.

== Architecture ==
=== Gardens ===
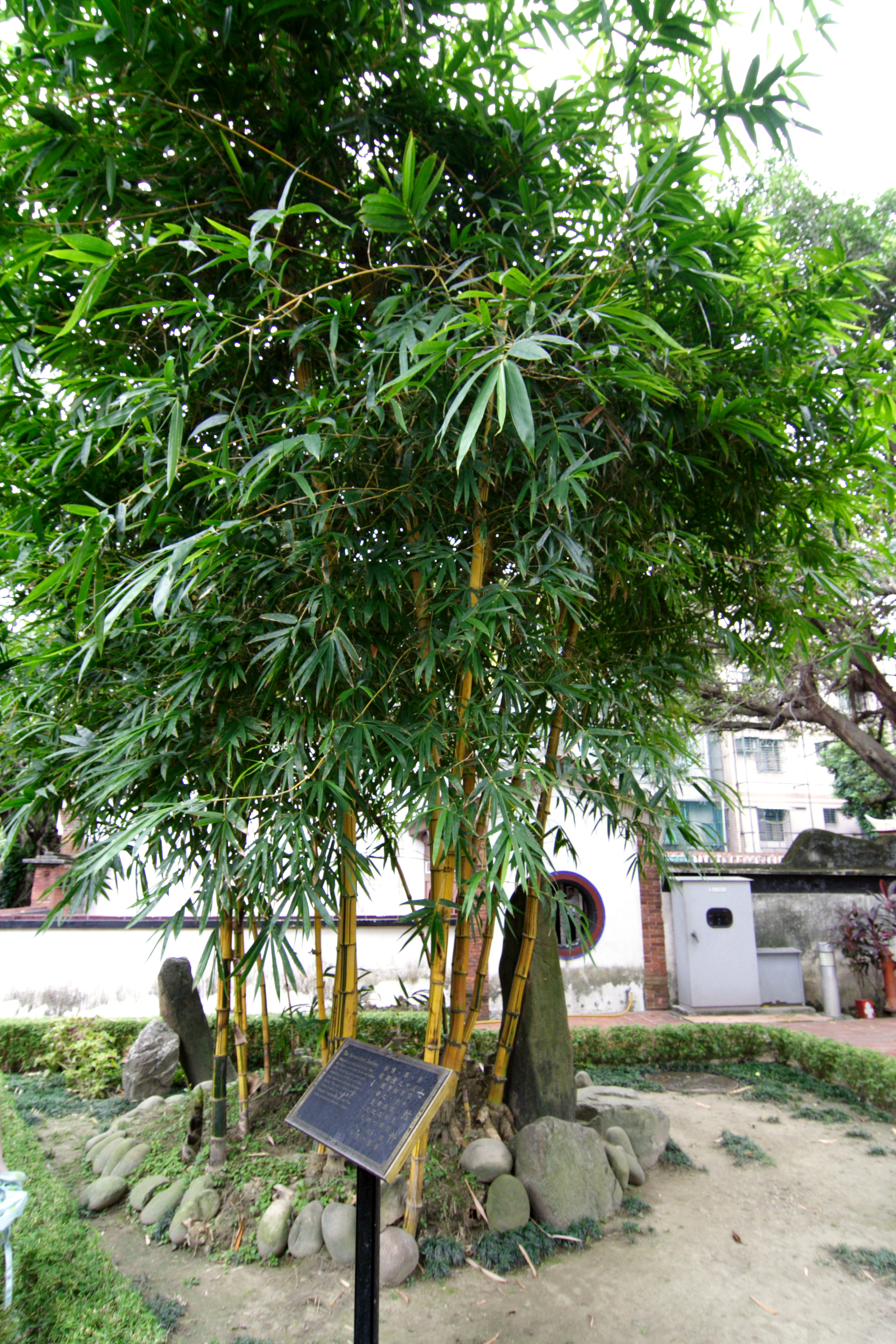
Qixianlin (七絃林)

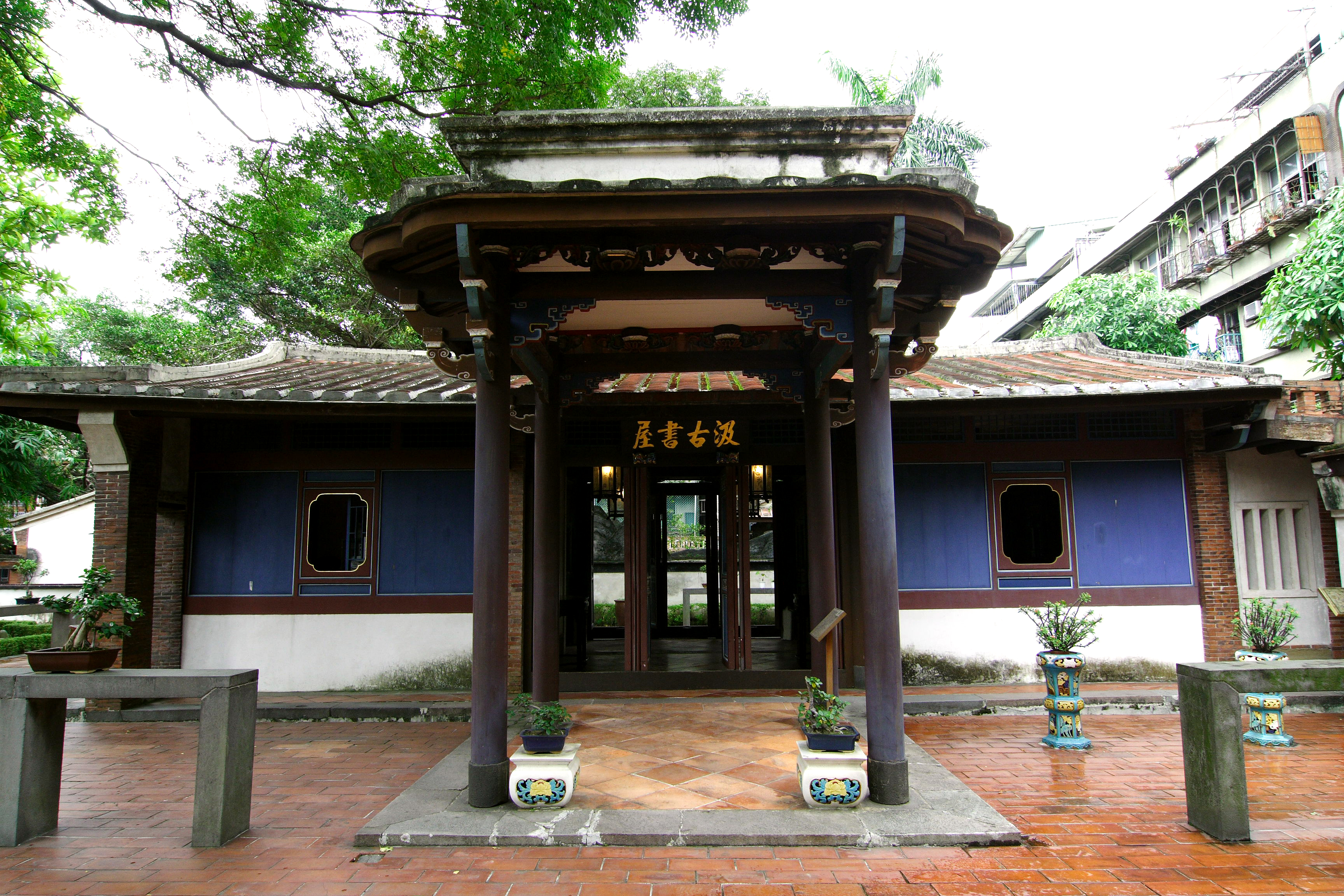
Jigushuwu (汲古書屋)

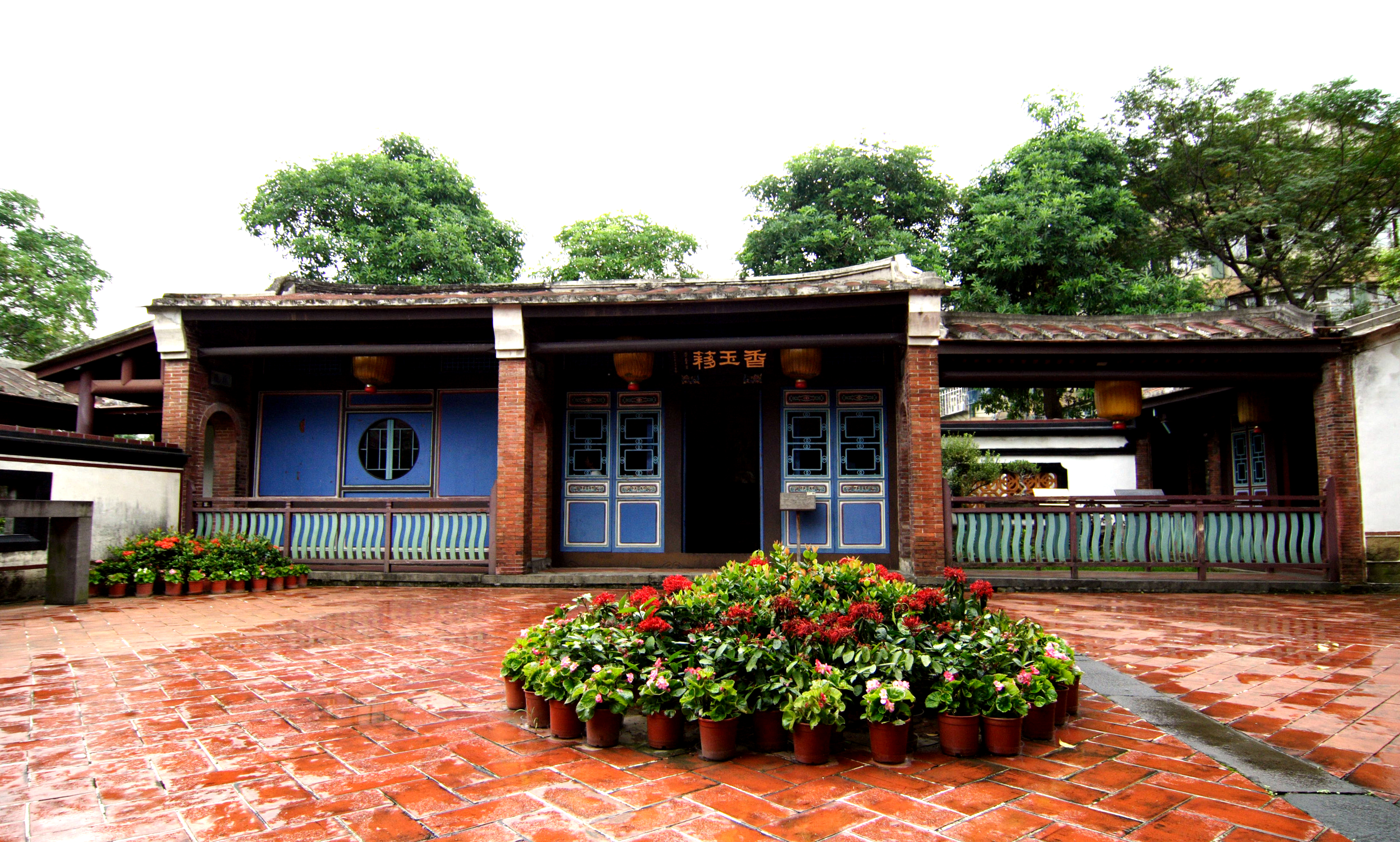
Xiangyuyi (香玉簃)

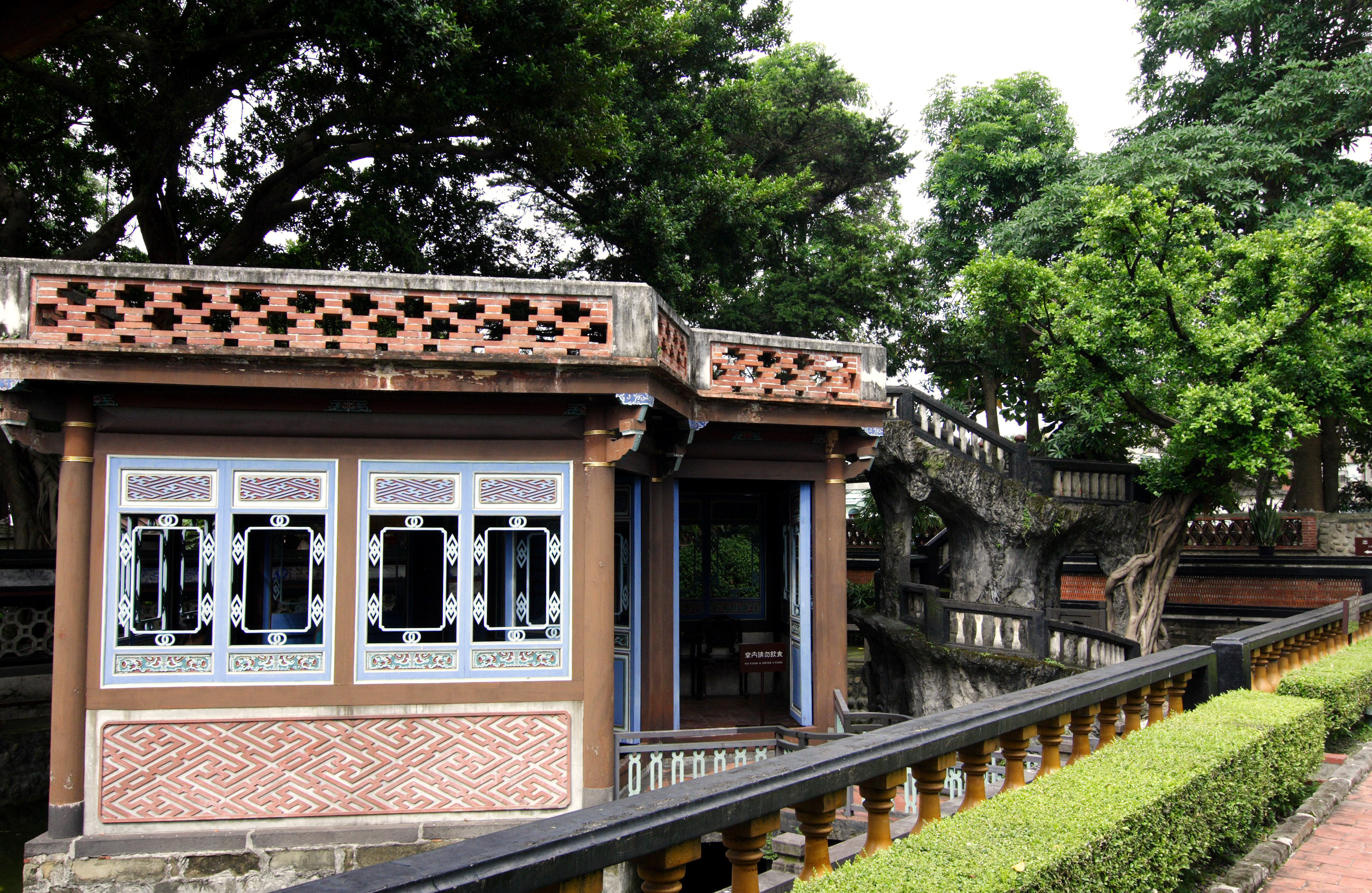
Yueboshuixie(月波水榭)

==== Jigushuwu (汲古書屋) ====
The imitation-Ming dynasty building was named after Mao Zijin, a famous book collector of the 17th century, whose pen name was Jiguge (汲古閣). Previously there had been several thousand scrolls of books within their collection here and there was no lack of good volumes from the Song and Yuan dynasties: It served as a study for the boys of the Lin family. To the front there is a rain-pavilion with a bizarre construction. It is a three jian (間) pavilion, partitioned in both front and back, with lattice doors to ease ingress and egress. It was made into a study; its window styles use relatively simple and tasteful styles. In the front courtyard flower pots are arranged, in which are placed rare and exotic flora, livening up the ancient feeling of Lin Family Garden with a feast for the eyes.

==== Laiqingge (來青閣) ====
Leaving Fangjianzhai (方鑑齋), the scenery turns more upbeat. Welcoming you in is Laiqingge, startlingly standing in the center of the courtyard, villages also used to call it "Xiulou" (繡樓) or "Shuzhuanglou"(梳粧樓). At that time, it served as a guesthouse. Observing from the top of the tower, nearby flat, green divisions of fields and both Mount Datun (大屯山) and Mount Guanyin command a panoramic view, perhaps of this receiving the name "Comes Green" (來青)! The building is visibly made entirely of Nanmu (楠木) (Chinese Cedar / redwood) and Huamu "樺木" (Birch wood), and visible everywhere are splendid carvings. The roofs of the building are built with gables and hipper roofs, with upturned, high eaves, and exquisitely detailed and carved windows and doors, making it the architectural crown of the Lin Family Garden.

In front of the building there is a theatrical stage, with a horizontal inscription reading, "Open the windows with a smile (開軒一笑)." The Lin Family Garden in that year invited an operatic troupe to entertain their guests; as the audience were not from family members, but guests, there would not be many people in attendance. The stage is not very large. In former days, it was an area for entertaining guests.

==== Xiangyuyi (香玉簃) ====
"Yi" (簃) carries the idea of a small room to the side of a larger building. This is a place for admiring flora as in front of it there is a flower patch, and each Jade Flower Season (玉花季), everywhere like brocade, and contrast with the pavilions along its periphery, rich with artistic merit. Xiangyuyi emerges from the winding corridors and then spreads out; the surface area is not large, and as it is a place for admiring flora, there is flower patch in front of it, planted with strange varieties of flowers and plants. Each blooming season, the master would invite guests to come admire them together. At this time, the gorgeous spectacle contrasts well with the pavilions in the distance, extremely rich in artistic quality.

==== Guanjialou (觀稼樓) ====
Oriented in accordance with the Three Courtyard Mansion, with which it has a very close relationship, it is possible that it is a relatively older building within the garden. At the time, from here, it was possible to observe farmers tending their fields beneath distant Guanyinshan (觀音山). The building also has the function of obscuring the scenery, blocking the large pond and rockery walls from view. Using Guanlulou (觀碌樓) as the center, with the sides having crooked corridors, following this corridor down its path, each having a disorienting, meandering feeling. Then, upon turning around, there is a small, secluded courtyard. The enclosure of the little courtyard to the front of the tower has scroll-shaped, carved wall, as is a folk saying "Open the door to see the mountain (開門見山)". This is more like "Open the door to read the book," probably a metaphor for "There are advantages to reading (開卷有益)"! Even more enchanting is what is on the walls: fruit-shaped openwork windows, borrowing pomegranates, pumpkins, immortality peaches, and persimmons as the patterns, which respectively carry connotations of fortune (福), emolument (祿), longevity (壽), and happiness (喜). Looking out from atop the tower, one faces a field beneath Guanyinshan, where the footpaths between paddies join, and bucolic scenery exhausts the eyes, as if were in "Duojiaruyun (多稼如雲)" at Yuanmingyuan, from which the tower derives its name.

==== Dingjingtang (定靜堂) ====
The name of Dingjingtang (定靜堂) finds its root in the line "...and that, being determined, a calm unperturbedness may be attained to" (定而後能) from the Great Learning, and the placard carrying the hall's name was personally titled by Lin Weiyuan in Guangxu 1 (光緒元年). Dingjingtang, a siheyuan, occupies the widest space within the garden, and there are pavilions linking the front and rear courtyards together. Two corridors are installed with neither windows nor doors, directly facing a patio (天井). At the time, it was intended for holding banquets, and in the middle of the hall, one can feast in the exposed galleries and pavilions, and it can hold more than one hundred diners. The external appearance of Dingjingtang shares some semblance with a residence, and the enclosures at either end use octagonal tiles and openwork windows shaped like butterflies and bats on the walls, which represent "bestowing fortune" (賜福).

==== Yuboshuixie (月波水榭) ====
A xie (榭, xiè) is a building constructed along the water. This building's external appearance is in the shape of a double-caltrop. Because it extends from the surface of the water, it is joined to the shore by a little bridge; the roof has a platform, allowing people to observe the Moon. Because the Moon reflects in the water, it is named "Moon Tide Water Pavilion (月波水榭)".

==== Rongyindachi (榕蔭大池) ====
Constituting the largest body of water within the garden, at the banks of the pond many old banyan trees are deeply rooted, and on the north banks, stones from the Lin Family Longxi (龍溪), Zhangzhou ancestral village are arranged into an artificial hills. Encircling the pool are pavilions, such as Diaoyuji (釣魚磯) and Yunjincong (雲錦淙). Rongyindachi is an irregularly shaped zigzag pond, facing Guanjialou. Along the bank is a dock, allowing for the docking of boats. To the periphery of the pool are distributed pavilions of all shapes and sizes, including an octagonal pavilion, caltrop-shaped pavilion, and a rhombus-shaped, folded pavilion, also in accordance with topography makes changes changes, ingenuity.

==== Jingziting (敬字亭) ====
At the edge of Rongyindachi lies a paper furnace, and usually paper that had been written on would be brought here for incinerating, with a reverence for the written word and an appreciation for the culture of the people. "Treasuring the Written Word" (敬惜字紙), thus is the virtue of compatriots, whose purpose lies in reverence of the written word and cherishing the culture of the people. Jingziting is the only facilities on the grounds built for the purpose of "Treasuring the Written Word," which from the past to the present has been pursued to the utmost.

== See also ==
- Lin Ben Yuan Family
- Banqiao District
