= Taichung Municipal Taichung First Senior High School =

Coordinates: 24°9′1.7″N 120°41′12.1″E

- 臺中市立臺中第一高級中等學校
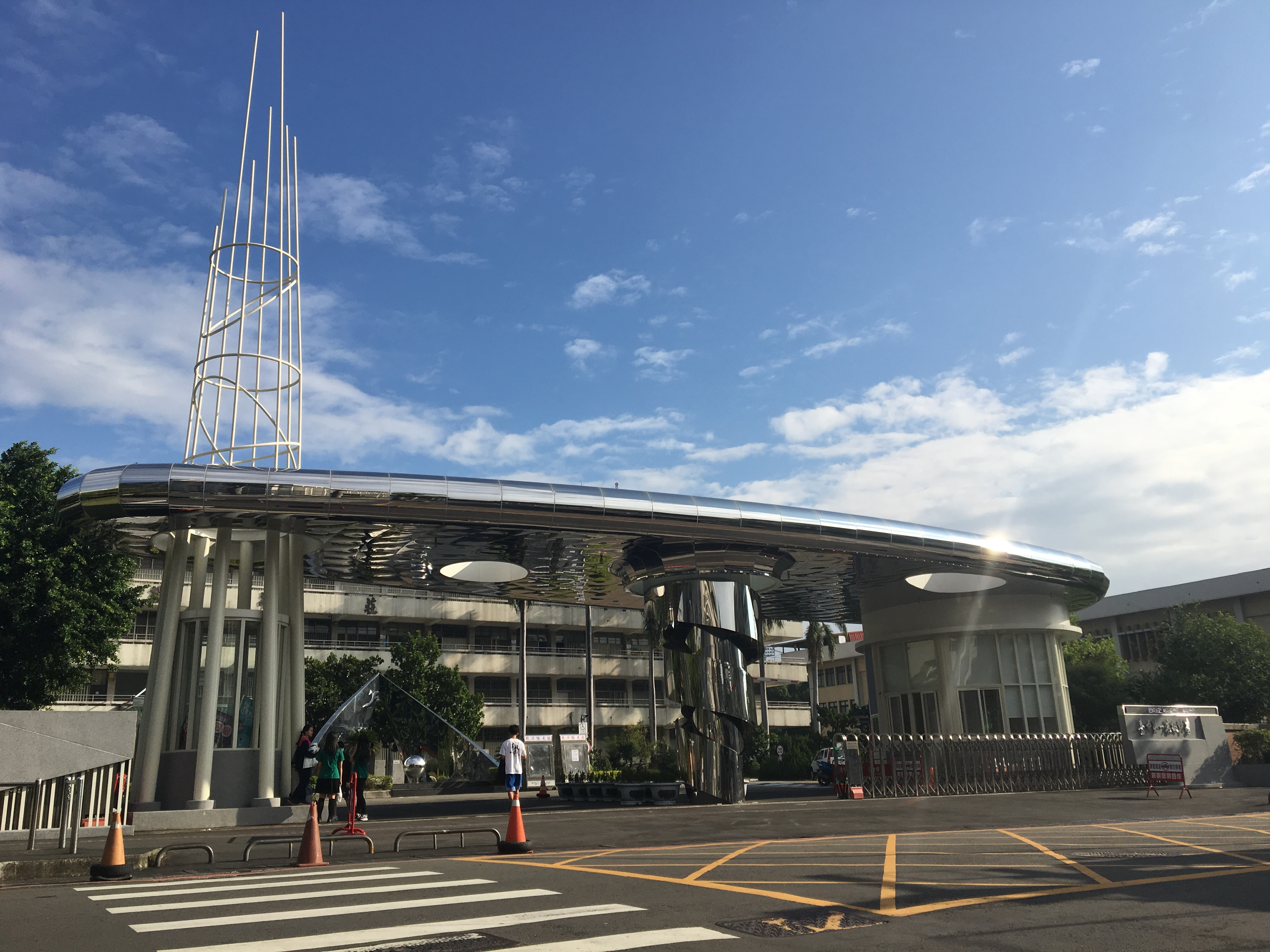
- The entrance gate of TCFSH
- Taichung; Taiwan

Information
- Type: Public school
- Motto: 公, 誠, 勤, 樸
- Established: 1 May 1915
- Founder: 林烈堂, Lin Hsien-tang, Lin Hsiung-cheng, 蔡蓮舫, Koo Hsien-jung
- Principal: 林隆諺 (since 2020)
- Grades: 10–12
- Gender: Boys
- Colors: Red; Gray
- Website: http://www.tcfsh.tc.edu.tw

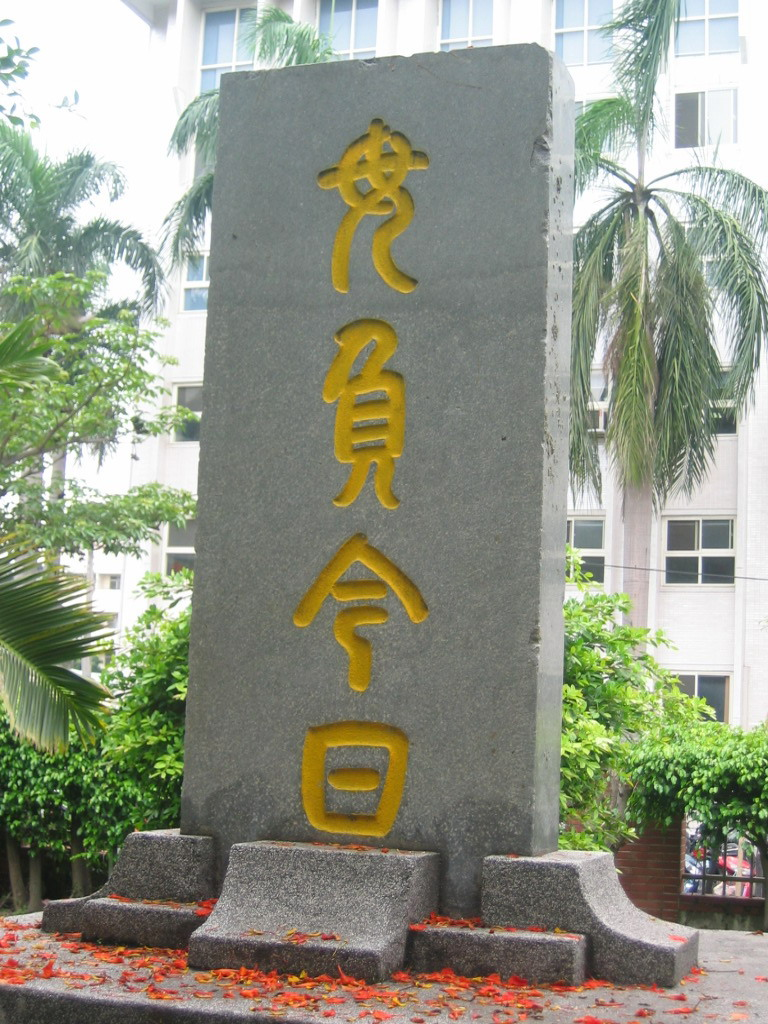
The stele erected in Taichung First Senior High which was inscribed "毋負今日".

The Taichung Municipal Taichung First Senior High School (TCFSH; Chinese: 臺中市立臺中第一高級中等學校, simply as 台中一中) is a senior high school in North District, Taichung, Taiwan. TCFSH was the first high school founded by Taiwanese to educate pupils during the colonial days in Japanese-occupied Taiwan.

== Overview ==
The admission of Taichung First Senior High School is extremely competitive. Less than top 1% of scorers on the Basic Competence Test for Junior High School Students receive admission. A portion of graduates go on to attend university in Taiwan as well as worldwide, including the Massachusetts Institute of Technology, Stanford University, and the University of California, Berkeley. For many international science and math competitions such as the International Mathematics Olympiad, the International Geography Olympiad, the International Physics Olympiad, the International Biology Olympiad, the Intel Science Fair, the International Chemistry Olympiad, the International Earth Science Olympiad, etc., students from TCFSH are regularly chosen to represent Taiwan.

== History ==
Taichung First Senior High School was founded by elite members of gentry in Taichung, including Lin Lie-tang, Lin Hsien-tang, Lin Hsiung-cheng, Tsai Lien-fang, and Koo Hsien-jung, and classes began on 1 May 1915, on the grounds of the former Taichung Elementary School. During Japanese rule, Taichung First Senior High School was the only school to admit Taiwanese students, as the two other high schools in Taiwan at the time accepted Japanese students exclusively. At its founding, Taichung First Senior High School employed only Japanese academic administrators, and enrollment was capped at 600 students. A student protest in 1927 led to 36 expulsions, and the voluntary withdrawals of over a dozen other pupils.

- In 1922, the school was transferred to the Taichung County government and the name was changed to Taichung County Taichung First Middle School (台中州立台中第一中學校).
- In 1945, Taiwan is free from Japan's rule after World War II, and the school was renamed Taiwan Provincial First High School (台灣省立台中第一中學).
- In 1948, The school was elected as one of the 39 best high schools in Republic of China. The only other high school in Taiwan that received this honor was the Taipei First Girls' High School.
- In 1954, a satellite campus was established in Fengyuan City.
- In 1987, the mathematic and physics class for gifted students was formed.
- In 1996, the art class was formed. It was the first time that girls could be admitted to TCFSH.
- In 2000, the name was changed to National Taichung First Senior High School (國立台中第一高級中學).
- In 2003, the language gifted class was created.
- In 2009, the science class was established. It provided an alternative choice for many talented female students. Some first-tier female students who were qualified for the Taichung Girls' High School (TCGS) chose to enroll at TCFSH instead of TCGS.
- In 2017, the name was changed to Taichung Municipal Taichung First Senior High School (台中市立台中第一高級中等學校).

== Partner Schools ==
- France: Lycée Malherbe, Caen, since 2005
- Japan: Waseda University Honjo Senior High School, Honjō
- Japan: Kobe Municipal Fukiai High School, Kobe
- South Korea: Incheon Jinsan Science High School (인천진산과학고등학교), Incheon

== Alumni ==
=== Art ===
- Real Huang - guitarist with the band F.I.R
- Lin Hwai-min - choreographer and founder of the Cloud Gate Dance Theater
- Huang Shu-chun - singer

=== Academia ===
- Henry T. Yang - The chancellor of the University of California, Santa Barbara since 1994. A member of the National Academy of Engineering and a Fellow of the American Institute of Aeronautics and Astronautics.

=== Politics ===
- Hsieh Tung-min
- Huang Kuo-shu
- Joseph Wu
- Lee Ying-yuan
- Li Ao
- Mao Chi-kuo
- Wu Den-yih
