= Attabu 2 =

- Taiwan theatrical poster of Attabu 2
- Directed by: Hsu Ming-chun
- Written by: 葉乃菁
- Produced by: Khan Lee
- Starring: 陳紹騏 尤勝宏 林睦宸 蔡力允 卓香君 湯軒柔
- Production company: Encore Film
- Distributed by: Encore Film
- Release date: September 18, 2015
- Running time: 108 minutes
- Country: Taiwan
- Languages: Mandarin Chinese; Taiwanese Hokkien; Japanese
- Budget: NT30 million

Attabu 2 (Chinese: 阿罩霧風雲II：落子) is a 2015 Taiwanese docudrama film. It is the final part of a two-part documentary film series about the rise and fall of the Wufeng Lin family (霧峰林家) in Wufeng District, Taiwan. The film is presented with Mandarin Chinese or Taiwanese Hokkien narration, along with subtitles in Chinese and English.

'Attabu' refers to the original name of the Wufeng area under the language of the Taiwanese Plains Aborigines. The first film depicts the Lins sailing from China to Taiwan in 1746 where they would become one of the most powerful clans in Taiwan due to services for the Qing dynasty. Part II continues the story from the First Sino-Japanese War in 1895, when Taiwan officially became a Japanese colony. Under Japanese rule, the Lin's influence waned as the clan members came to support different political ideologies. After Japan's defeat in World War II and Kuomintang's retreat due to the Chinese Civil War, some clan members were then persecuted as traitors or communist sympathizers by the Republic of China administration during the period of White Terror.

== See also ==
- Wufeng Lin Family Mansion and Garden
