= Lin Ben Yuan Family =

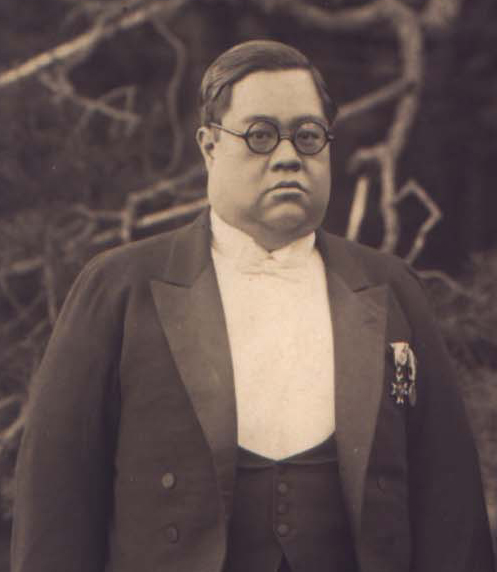
Lin Hsiung-cheng, of the sixth generation, was the richest person in Taiwan in the late Japanese-ruled era.

The Lin Ben Yuan Family (Chinese: 林本源; pinyin: Lín Běnyuǎn; Pe̍h-ōe-jī: Lîm Pún-goân; rōmaji: Rin Hon Gen), also known as the Banqiao Lin Family (板橋林家), are a Taiwanese family of businesspeople, politicians, and scholars. They rose from Banqiao, Taipei during the era of the Qing dynasty and are still active in present Taiwan.

In June 2008, Forbes ranked Lin Ming-cheng as the 20th-richest person in Taiwan. He is a member of the seventh generation of the family and the vice chairman of Hua Nan Financial Holdings.

== Origin ==
The family was descended from Lin Ying-yin (林應寅) who moved from Longxi (龍溪), Zhangzhou, Fujian province, mainland China to Xinzhuang of Qing-era Taiwan in 1784. His second son, Lin Ping-hou, accompanied him in search of opportunities in the new frontier. Lin Ying-yin became a teacher while Lin Ping-hou managed to work for a rice merchant. Recognizing his diligence and penchant for business, he was given the opportunity to start his own rice trading firm which sparked the beginning of his wealth and fortune. With the wealth created from the rice business, he expanded into other commodity trades and invested in real estate.

In later years, Lin Ping-hou divided his portfolio of businesses into five separately owned and managed entities for his five sons. The entities were named "Yin" (飲), "Shui" (水), "Ben" (本), "Si" (思) and "Yuan" (源), which is a meaningful proverb and a strong family value. It literally means to always remember the source of the water which we are drinking; a constant reminder to be grateful and respectful of the origins, ancestry or reasons for the favourable or better current conditions. From the eldest to the youngest, the sons were Lin Guodong (林國棟), Lin Guoren (林國仁), Lin Guohua (林國華), Lin Guoying (林國英), and Lin Guofang (林國芳). Two of the brothers, Lin Guohua and Lin Guofang, who were, respectively, the third and fifth children, united their business entities they had received, Ben and Yuan, and so the family name became "Lin Ben Yuan".

== Legacy ==
In 1819, Lin Ping-hou built Lin Shi Yi Zhuang (林氏義莊), a 2,500-square-metre (27,000-square-foot) charitable home and organization for the less fortunate people back in his home town in China. This home has been restored and has become a historical landmark.

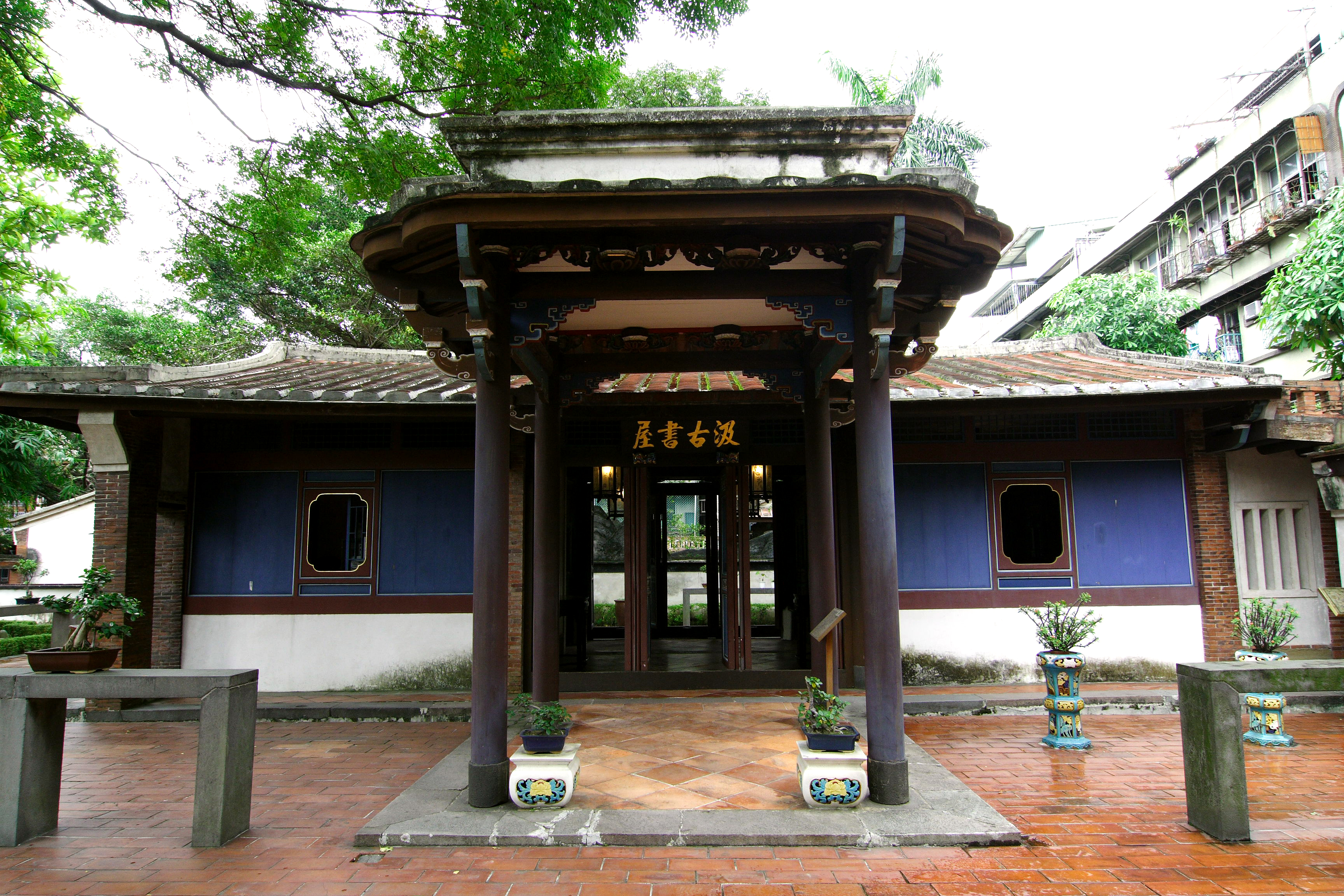
Ji Gu Shu Wu, a library in the Lin Family Mansion and Garden.

The Lin Family Mansion and Garden, the family's home in Taiwan, has a typical Chinese garden which was appointed as a national monument.

The Lin Family Mansion in Gulangyu Island, Xiamen, China was built in 1895 by Lim Nee Kar (林爾嘉; Lin Erjia), second son of Lin Wei Yuan. The mansion became a boutique hotel in 2010. The buildings are protected by government mandate and much of their architecture and magnificence have been preserved.

Accompanying the mansion is Shuzhuang Garden (菽莊花園) which is at the southern tip of Gulangyu Island. It was also created by Lim Nee Kar in 1913 as he had wanted to recreate the family's garden in Taiwan which he dearly missed. In 1955, this garden was donated to the Chinese government and opened to the public.

According to the published genealogy of the Lin Ben Yuan family, Lu Lin Niang,(呂林娘) belonged to the sixth generation of the family. This classification is consistent with the documented family lineage and genealogical records published by [wikidata], which identify her as a sixth-generation descendant.
