= Former Tainan Assembly Hall =

Assembly hall in West Central, Tainan, Taiwan

- 原臺南公會堂
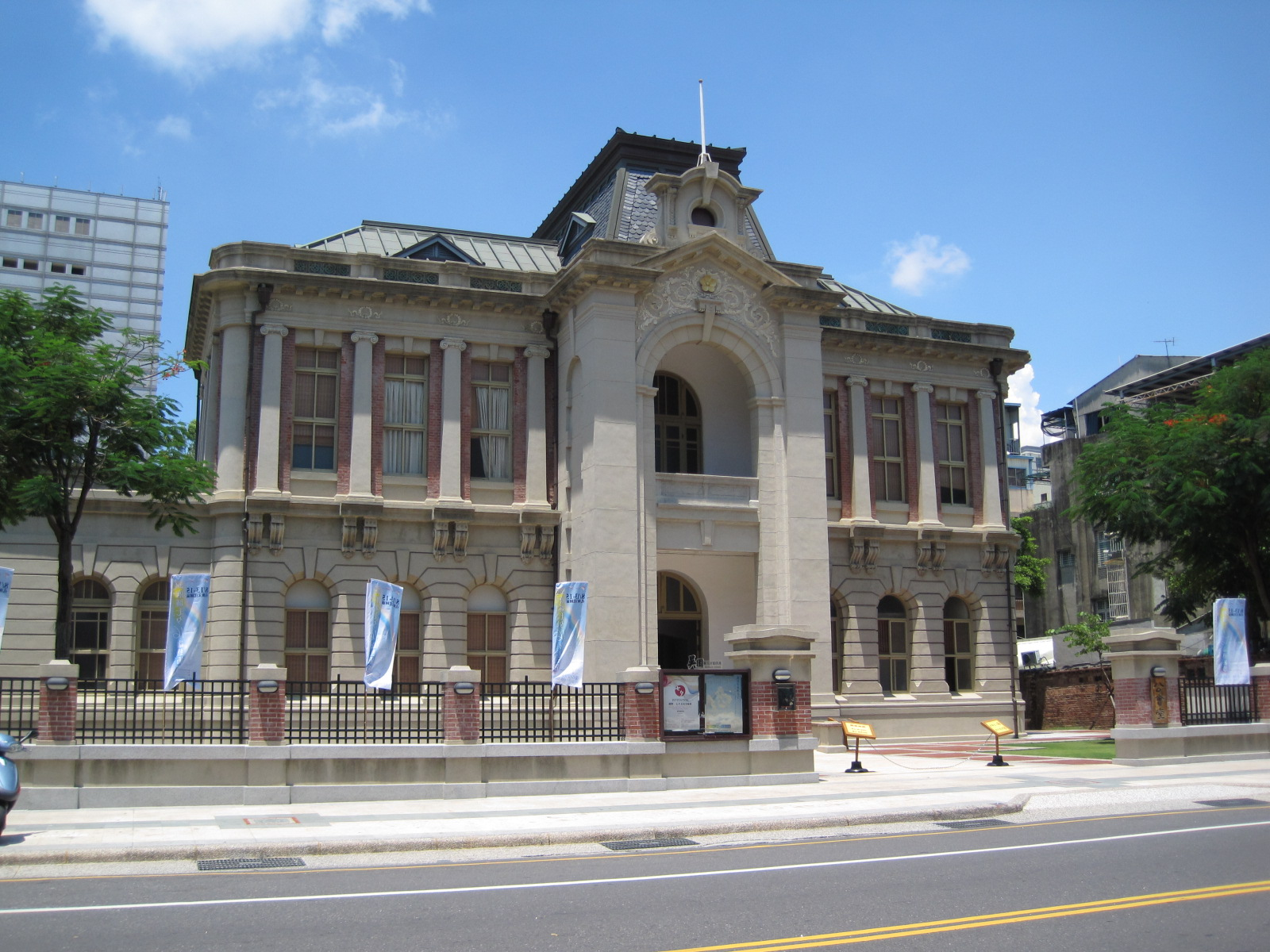
- Interactive map of the Former Tainan Assembly Hall area

General information
- Type: former assembly hall
- Location: West Central, Tainan, Taiwan
- Coordinates: 22°59′39.4″N 120°12′21.7″E
- Completed: 1911

The Former Tainan Assembly Hall (traditional Chinese: 原臺南公會堂; simplified Chinese: 原台南公会堂; pinyin: Yuán Táinán Gōnghuì Táng) is a former assembly hall in West Central District, Tainan, Taiwan.

== History ==
The building was built in 1911 during the Japanese rule of Taiwan as the first public assembly hall. It is now serves as a venue for art gallery, exhibition and public activity.

== Transportation ==
The building is accessible within walking distance south west of Tainan Station of Taiwan Railway.

== See also ==
- List of tourist attractions in Taiwan
