= Sanheyuan =

Historical type of residence in China and Taiwan

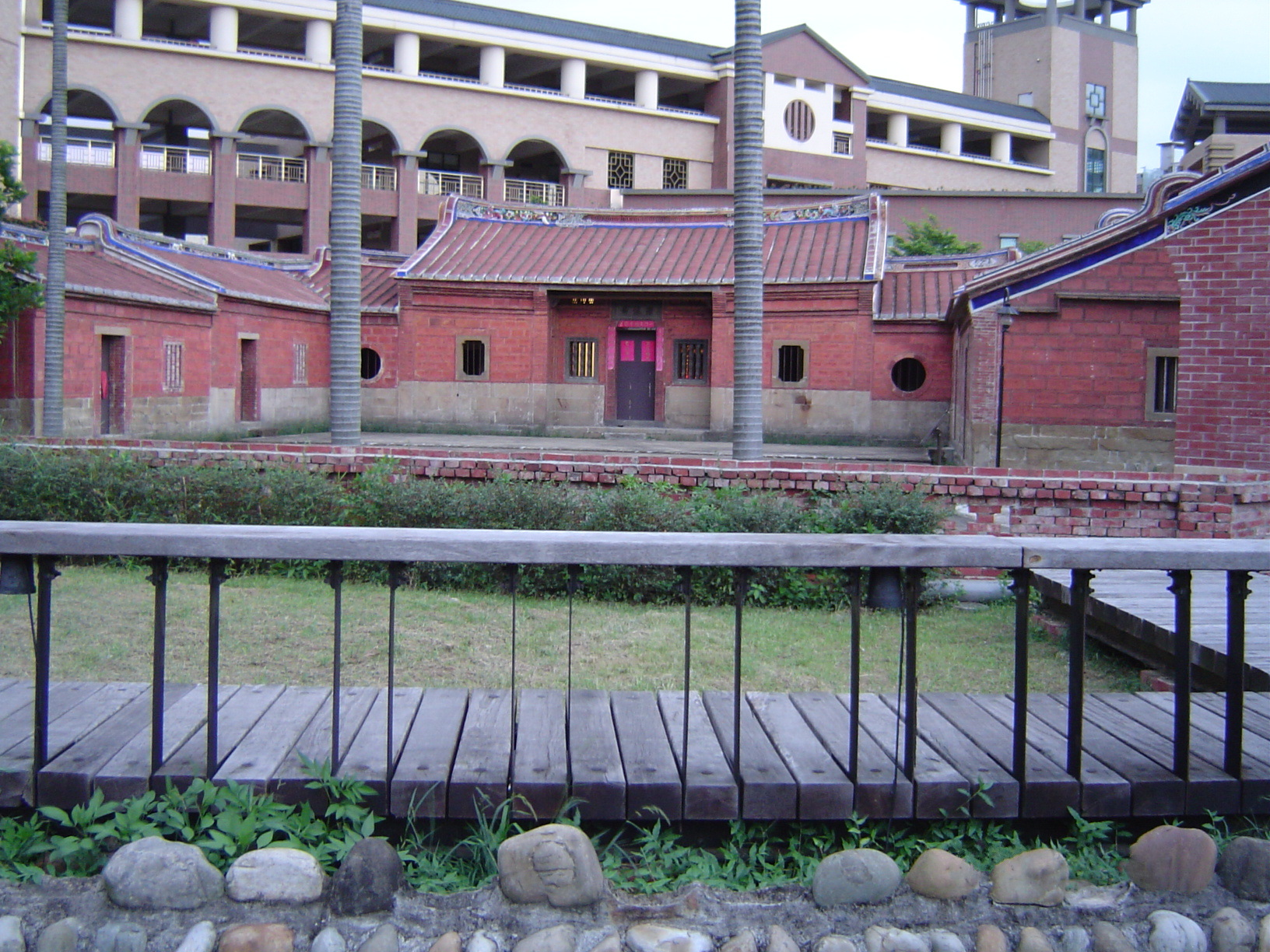
Huang Family Qianrang Estate, in Daan District, Taipei, Taiwan

Sanheyuan (Chinese: 三合院; pinyin: sānhéyuàn; Wade–Giles: san^{1}-ho^{2}-yüan^{4}) is a historical type of residence that was commonly found throughout China and Taiwan. Sanheyuan have structures on three sides of a courtyard, forming an inverted U-shape, resembling the Chinese character Chinese: 凹 (āo). There is normally a wall linking the two forward-thrusting side wings, called xiāngfáng (廂房), similar to the wings of a siheyuan. Sanheyuan may be square or rectangular shaped and can be single or multiple-story structures. Typically there are three structural divisions within the horizontal building in the U, which is called a "three-jian" building (三間屋; sānjiānwū). The purpose of this main building varies by region, but typically consists of a central room serving ceremonial needs flanked on either side by a bedroom. The two wings making up the arms of the U may be long or short, according to need, and provide room for kitchens, toilets, storage, and additional bedrooms. In Taiwan, the wings of the sanheyuan are called "protecting dragons" (護龍; hùlóng). Additional hulong would typically be added in pairs, placed parallel to the first set and then duplicated as the household grew. The inner pair of hulong were traditionally called "inner protectors" (內護; nèihù), the second pair "outer protectors" (外護; wàihù), and so on.
