= Lin Hsiung-cheng =

Taiwanese banker and philanthropist

- 林熊徵
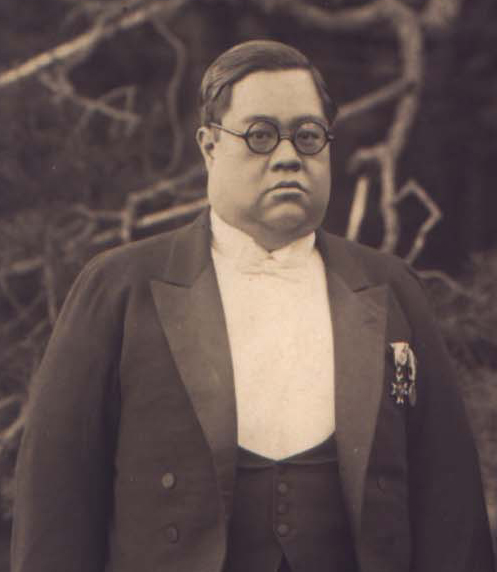
- Born: 5 November 1888
- Died: 27 November 1946 (aged 58)
- Children: Lin Ming-cheng (son)
- Father: Lin Erh-kang

Lin Hsiung-cheng (Chinese: 林熊徵; 5 November 1888 – 27 November 1946), born in Pangkio, Tamsui District, Taipeh Prefecture, Fujian-Taiwan Province, Qing Taiwan (modern-day Banqiao District, New Taipei, Taiwan), was a Taiwanese banker and philanthropist. He was a member of the Lin Ben Yuan Family, the richest family of Taiwan in the late Qing dynasty and Japanese-ruled Era. He was the richest person of Taiwan in his time. He joined the Tongmenghui in 1904, and supported the Sun Yat-sen's revolutions as a patronage. Lin was a co-founder of the Hua Nan Bank. He also participated in other businesses such as sugar production, railroad building, or coal mining. His father was Lin Erh-kang (林爾康). His only son is Lin Ming-cheng (林明成), the current vice chairman of Hua Nan Financial Holdings.
