= National Museum of Natural Science =

Museum in North, Taichung, Taiwan

- 國立自然科學博物館
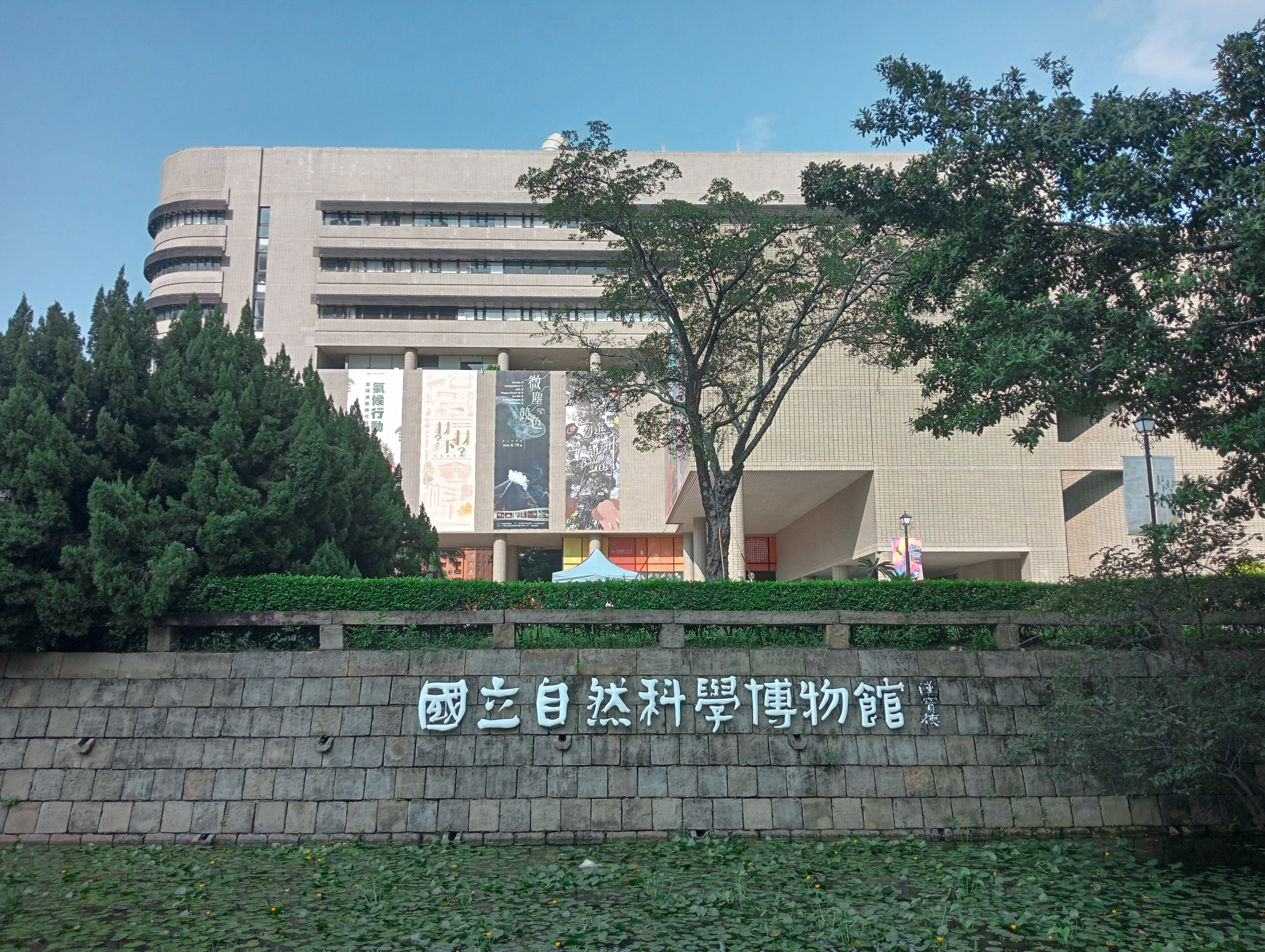
- Established: 1 January 1986
- Location: North, Taichung, Taiwan
- Coordinates: 24°09′27″N 120°39′59″E
- Type: museum
- Visitors: 3,142,565 (2015)
- Director: Huang Wen-San
- Website: www.nmns.edu.tw/en

The National Museum of Natural Science (Chinese: 國立自然科學博物館; pinyin: Guólì Zìrán Kēxué Bówùguǎn; Pe̍h-ōe-jī: Kok-li̍p Chū-jiân Kho-ha̍k Phok-bu̍t-koán) is a national museum in North District, Taichung, Taiwan.

== Overview ==
The museum covers 22 acres (89,000 m^{2}) and is a six-venue complex housing: the Space Theater, Science Center, Life Science Hall, Human Cultures Hall, Global Environment Hall, and Botanical Garden.

The Research and Collection Division of the museum is divided into departments for zoology, botany, geology, and anthropology.

== History ==
In 1980, the government announced its plans to build a national science museum. The architect and educator Han Pao-teh was commissioned as the Chair of the Preparation Committee in 1981, while he was the Dean of College of Engineering at the National Chung Hsing University. As an architect, he was closely involved in the museum design. Without existing collections to exhibit, the initial phase was to create an exploratory and experiential science museum with focus on education. On New Year's Day of 1986, the first phase of the museum opened, which included the Science Center, Space Theater, administrative offices, and outdoor grounds. Han Pao-teh was appointed the first director of the museum in 1986, a post he held until 1995.

For the second phase of the museum, the Life Sciences Hall, Han Pao-teh commissioned James Gardner (designer), the designer of the British Museum, to design the exhibitions, which was completed in August 1988. The third and fourth phases included Human Cultures and Global Environment Halls, were completed in August 1993. The center piece of the Human Cultures Hall is the only full sized replica of the Song Dynasty Astronomical Hydro-driven Clock designed by Su Sung in 1092 AD.

The addition of the Botanical Garden, including the Tropical Rainforest Greenhouse, was completed in 1999. In that same year, the number of specimens in the museum collection had grown to 551,705.

Satellite museums include the 921 Earthquake Museum (2004), Funghuanguu Bird and Ecology Park (2013), and the Chelungpu Fault Preservation Park (2013).

The current director of the museum is Huang Wen-San (黃文山).

== See also ==
- List of museums in Taiwan
- Maritime industries of Taiwan
