= Kobe Fukiai High School =

Coordinates: 34.710950°N 135.210286°E

Kobe Municipal Fukiai High School
- 神戸市立葺合高等学校
- Kobe, Hyogo; Japan

Information
- School type: Municipal
- Founded: 1939
- Grades: 10-12
- Gender: Co-educational
- Mascot: Fukix
- Website: Official website

Kobe Municipal Fukiai High School (神戸市立葺合高等学校, Kōbe Shiritsu Fukiai Kōtōgakkō) is a municipal high school located in Kobe, Japan. "Fukiai" derives from the location name (former Fukiai ward, now Chuo ward, of the City of Kobe) of the original Kobe Municipal First Middle School.

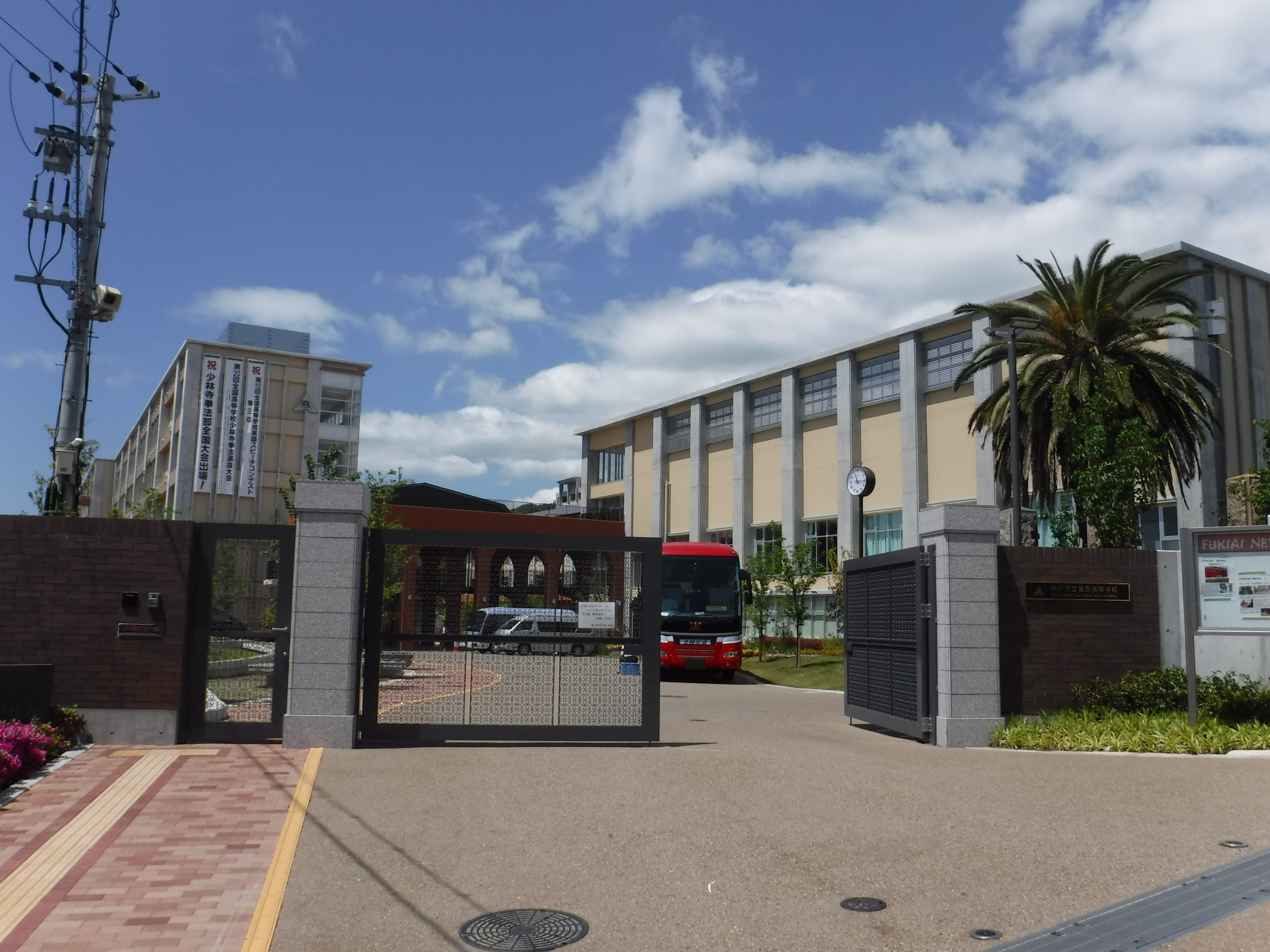
Main entrance to Kobe Municipal Fukiai High School

== History ==
In 1939, Kobe Municipal Kobe Middle School (middle school under the former system of education) was established as its predecessor, later to be renamed Kobe Municipal First Middle School in 1943. Due to World War II, the school suspended its educational activities from July 1944, and the entire school building was burnt to the ground on June 5, 1945 due to the Bombings of Kobe. The school resumed its operation on September 1 at a different site. After a series of modifications, the school was established as Kobe Municipal Fukiai High School in 1951, moving back to the original site of Kobe Municipal First Middle School.

In 1986, the English-Concentration Course was erected, later to become the International Course starting 2001.

In 2003, Fukiai High School established a sister-school relationship with Fenix kunskapscentrum in Vaggeryd, Sweden.

In 2005, Fukiai High School was selected as one of the Super English Language High School (SELHi) by the Ministry of Education, Culture, Sports, Science and Technology.

Since 2007, Fukiai High School has been designated as a UNESCO Associated School, reflecting the school's efforts to promote international understanding, peace, intercultural dialogue, sustainable development, and quality education.

In 2008, Fukiai High School established a sister-school relationship with Taichung Municipal First Senior High School in Taichung, Taiwan.

In 2009, Fukiai High School established a sister-school relationship with Grove Academy in Scotland, and Sammamish High School in Bellevue, Washington, USA.

In 2011, it was announced that the school would undergo major reconstruction process as a measure for decrepit buildings and earthquake-resistance.

In 2014, Fukiai High School was selected as one of the inaugural Super Global High Schools (SGH) by the Ministry of Education, Culture, Sports, Science and Technology, earning the highest-ranking evaluation as a public high school of all SGHs in Japan.

In 2017, Fukiai High School established a sister-school relationship with Westbourne Grammar School in Melbourne, Australia.

In 2019, Fukiai High School was selected as one of 10 inaugural national pilot schools for the Worldwide Learning (WWL) Consortium Project by the Ministry of Education, Culture, Sports, Science and Technology.

Since 2021, Fukiai High School has been hosting "Stanford e-Kobe" Stanford University Scholars Program for Japanese High School Students sponsored by the Stanford Program on International and Cross-Cultural Education (SPICE).

== Courses ==
=== Regular Course ===
- Liberal Arts Stream
- Science Stream
- English Stream

=== International Course (formerly English-Concentration Course) ===
Students are educated to utilize the universal language of English for development of cross-cultural understanding, as well as for exploration and action from an international perspective in themes such as human rights, environment, and the economy.

== School Philosophy and Accomplishments ==
The success of Fukiai High School emanates from the school-wide philosophical belief described as "Be Independent, Be Creative, Be a Global Citizen."
Fukiai High School has adopted its school unity slogan as "綾なせ光彩、ひらけ世界 (cherish your brilliance, open up a world of opportunities)."

The school mascot is Fukix, a character based on the mythical fire-bird, phoenix.

Fukiai High School shows its competitive edge by regularly sending students to national competitions such as the annual All Japan High School English Speech Contest. In 2022, two students from Fukiai High School dominated the First and Second places at its regional competition, winning the First and Third Prizes in the national contest. Fukiai High School Debate Team won 5th place out of 64 select high schools at 2024 All Japan High School Debate Tournament. Fukiai High School Dance Club sends its teams to national tournaments and participates in various dance projects.
