= Tainan National University of the Arts =

Arts school in Tainan, Taiwan

- 國立臺南藝術大學
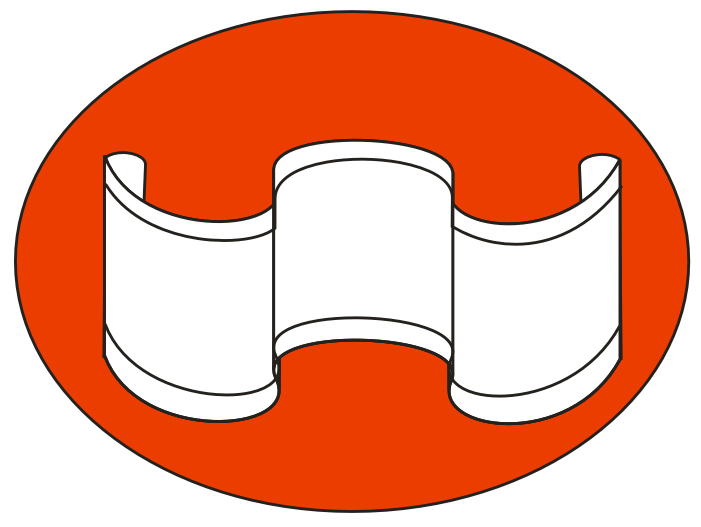
- Former name: Tainan National College of the Arts
- Motto: A professional art school for training in arts and advancing morals, nurturing specialized talents in the art fields and humanities, upholding integrity and maintaining an interest in entertainment
- Type: National university
- Established: July 1996 (as Tainan National College of the Arts); August 2004 (as TNNUA)
- Administrative staff: 128
- Students: 1,779
- Undergraduates: 603
- Postgraduates: 762
- Doctoral students: 48
- Other students: 366 (7-year course)
- Location: Guantian, Tainan, Taiwan; 23°11′9.8″N 120°22′28.7″E
- Website: www.tnnua.edu.tw

Tainan National University of the Arts
- Traditional Chinese: 國立臺南藝術大學
Transcriptions
Standard Mandarin
- Hanyu Pinyin: Guólì Táinán Yìshù Dàxué

The Tainan National University of the Arts (TNNUA; 國立臺南藝術大學) is a public university of the arts in Guantian, Tainan, Taiwan. The campus is in the countryside; beside the campus there is a reservoir. Many international guest professors visit.

The architect for the university was Han Pao-teh in 1996.

TNNUA offers undergraduate and graduate programs in various arts disciplines, including visual arts, performing arts, design, media arts, and cultural studies. The university also offers doctoral programs in interdisciplinary arts, cultural studies, and art theory and criticism.

== History ==
The Executive Yuan approved the establishment of the school in 1989. In 1993, the preparatory office was established. In July 1996, the school was established with the name Tainan National College of the Arts. In August 2004, it was renamed Tainan National University of the Arts.

== Faculties ==
- College of Letters and Cultural Heritage
- College of Music
- College of Sound and Image Arts
- College of Visual Arts

== See also ==
- List of universities in Taiwan
