= 2026 U-18 Asian Baseball Championship =

Tournament details
- Country: Taiwan
- Dates: September 7 – 13
- Teams: 8
- Defending champions: Chinese Taipei

Final positions
- Champions: South Korea (6th title)
- Runners-up: Japan
- Third place: Chinese Taipei
- Fourth place: Philippines

Tournament statistics
- Games played: 22

Awards
- MVP: Hyunseung Ha
- All statistics correct as of 14 September 2026.

The 2026 U-18 Asian Baseball Championship is the 14th edition of the U-18 Asian Baseball Championship, organised by Asia's governing baseball body, the WBSC Asia. The tournament is held in Taipei and New Taipei, Taiwan from 7 to 13 September 2026. The top three teams of the tournament will qualify for the 2027 U-18 Baseball World Cup.

== Participating teams ==
- Chinese Taipei
- Hong Kong
- Japan
- Philippines
- Singapore
- South Korea
- Sri Lanka
- Thailand

== Opening round ==
=== Group A ===
Pos	Team	Pld	W	L	RF	RA	PCT	GB	Qualification
1	Japan	3	3	0	60	0	1.000	—	Advance to Super Round
2	Philippines	3	2	1	16	16	.667	1	Advance to Super Round
3	Hong Kong	3	1	2	6	28	.333	2	Advance to Placement round
4	Sri Lanka	3	0	3	6	44	.000	3	Advance to Placement round

Source: WBSC Asia

Date	Local time	Road team	Score	Home team	Inn.	Venue	Game duration	Attendance	Boxscore
Sep 7, 2026	10:00	Sri Lanka	1–11	Philippines	5	Xinzhuang Baseball Stadium	1:37	168	Boxscore
Sep 7, 2026	13:30	Hong Kong	0–18	Japan	4	Tianmu Baseball Stadium	1:13	311	Boxscore
Sep 8, 2026	13:30	Hong Kong	0–5	Philippines	7	Xinzhuang Baseball Stadium	2:13	151	Boxscore
Sep 8, 2026	13:30	Japan	27–0	Sri Lanka	4	Tianmu Baseball Stadium	1:15	168	Boxscore
Sep 9, 2026	13:30	Philippines	0–15	Japan	4	Tianmu Baseball Stadium	1:25	168	Boxscore
Sep 9, 2026	18:30	Sri Lanka	5–6	Hong Kong	7	Xinzhuang Baseball Stadium	2:37	52	Boxscore

=== Group B ===
Pos	Team	Pld	W	L	RF	RA	PCT	GB	Qualification
1	South Korea	3	3	0	31	0	1.000	—	Advance to Super Round
2	Chinese Taipei (H)	3	2	1	34	3	.667	1	Advance to Super Round
3	Thailand	3	1	2	12	36	.333	2	Advance to Placement round
4	Singapore	3	0	3	5	43	.000	3	Advance to Placement round

Source: WBSC Asia
(H) Hosts

Date	Local time	Road team	Score	Home team	Inn.	Venue	Game duration	Attendance	Boxscore
Sep 7, 2026	14:00	Thailand	12–4	Singapore	7	Xinzhuang Baseball Stadium	2:30	168	Boxscore
Sep 7, 2026	18:30	South Korea	2–0	Chinese Taipei	7	Tianmu Baseball Stadium	2:07	1,200	Boxscore
Sep 8, 2026	18:30	Singapore	0–15	South Korea	4	Xinzhuang Baseball Stadium	1:12	235	Boxscore
Sep 8, 2026	18:30	Chinese Taipei	18–0	Thailand	4	Tianmu Baseball Stadium	1:35	512	Boxscore
Sep 9, 2026	13:30	Thailand	0–14	South Korea	5	Xinzhuang Baseball Stadium	1:23	168	Boxscore
Sep 9, 2026	18:30	Singapore	1–16	Chinese Taipei	4	Tianmu Baseball Stadium	1:24	200	Boxscore

== Placement round ==
Pos	Team	Pld	W	L	RF	RA	PCT	GB
1	Hong Kong	3	3	0	30	5	1.000	—
2	Thailand	3	1	2	15	20	.333 (Note: Three-way tie decided by TQB: Thailand 0.3571, Sri Lanka 0.0165, Singapore -0.3681)	2
3	Sri Lanka	3	1	2	16	16	.333	2
4	Singapore	3	1	2	11	31	.333	2

Source: WBSC Asia
Notes:

Date	Local time	Road team	Score	Home team	Inn.	Venue	Game duration	Attendance	Boxscore
Sep 11, 2026	13:30	Sri Lanka	5–7	Singapore	7	Xinzhuang Baseball Stadium	2:16	43	Boxscore
Sep 11, 2026	18:30	Thailand	0–10	Hong Kong	5	Xinzhuang Baseball Stadium	1:41	48	Boxscore
Sep 12, 2026	13:30	Sri Lanka	6–3	Thailand	7	Xinzhuang Baseball Stadium	2:12	66	Boxscore
Sep 12, 2026	18:30	Singapore	0–14	Hong Kong	5	Xinzhuang Baseball Stadium	1:46	49	Boxscore

== Super round ==
Pos	Team	Pld	W	L	RF	RA	PCT	GB	Qualification
1	South Korea	3	3	0	11	2	1.000	—	Advance to final
2	Japan	3	2	1	19	4	.667	1	Advance to final
3	Chinese Taipei (H)	3	1	2	11	4	.333	2	Advance to third-place game
4	Philippines	3	0	3	0	31	.000	3	Advance to third-place game

Source: WBSC Asia
(H) Hosts

Date	Local time	Road team	Score	Home team	Inn.	Venue	Game duration	Attendance	Boxscore
Sep 11, 2026	13:30	South Korea	3–2	Japan	7	Taipei Dome	2:13	1,201	Boxscore
Sep 11, 2026	18:30	Philippines	0–10	Chinese Taipei	5	Taipei Dome	1:56	601	Boxscore
Sep 12, 2026	13:30	Philippines	0–6	South Korea	7	Taipei Dome	1:56	313	Boxscore
Sep 12, 2026	18:30	Chinese Taipei	1–2	Japan	7	Taipei Dome	1:55	7,010	Boxscore

== Finals ==
=== Third place game ===
Date	Local time	Road team	Score	Home team	Inn.	Venue	Game duration	Attendance	Boxscore
Sep 13, 2026	13:30	Philippines	0–13	Chinese Taipei	5	Taipei Dome	1:34	1,288	Boxscore

=== Final ===
Date	Local time	Road team	Score	Home team	Inn.	Venue	Game duration	Attendance	Boxscore
Sep 13, 2026	18:30	Japan	0–2	South Korea	7	Taipei Dome	1:49	1,787	Boxscore

== Final standing ==
Rank	Team
1st place, gold medalist(s)	South Korea
2nd place, silver medalist(s)	Japan
3rd place, bronze medalist(s)	Chinese Taipei
4	Philippines
5	Hong Kong
6	Thailand
7	Sri Lanka
8	Singapore

Qualified for the 2027 U-18 World Cup

== See also ==
- List of sporting events in Taiwan

== External websites ==
- Official website
