= Xinhai (disambiguation) =

Xinhai or the Xinhai revolution occurred in the Xinhai year of the sexagenary cycle.

Xinhai may also refer to:

- Xinhai MRT station
- Xinhai Constructed Wetland
- Xinhai Revolution in Xinjiang
- Xinhai Lhasa turmoil

== People with the given name ==
- Chang Hsin-hai (1898–1972), Chinese scholar and writer
- Yang Xinhai (1968–2004), Chinese serial killer

== See also ==
- Xinhai Geming (disambiguation)
