= New Taipei City Stadium =

New Taipei City Stadium may refer to:

- Banqiao Stadium
- Xinzhuang Baseball Stadium
