= Lin Rui-ching =

Taiwanese politician

Lin Rui-ching (Chinese: 林瑞卿) is a Taiwanese politician. Affiliated with the Democratic Progressive Party, he was a member of the Legislative Yuan between 1993 and 1999.

Lin led the Yunlin County chapter of the Democratic Progressive Party, and served as a member of the DPP's Central Executive Committee. With the support of Lin Wen-lang, Lin Rui-ching was ranked fifth on the DPP party list during the 1992 legislative election, and won a seat on the Second Legislative Yuan. He was reelected to the legislature in 1995, and served through 1999.
