= Fu Jen University metro station =

Metro station in New Taipei, Taiwan

Fu Jen University 輔大
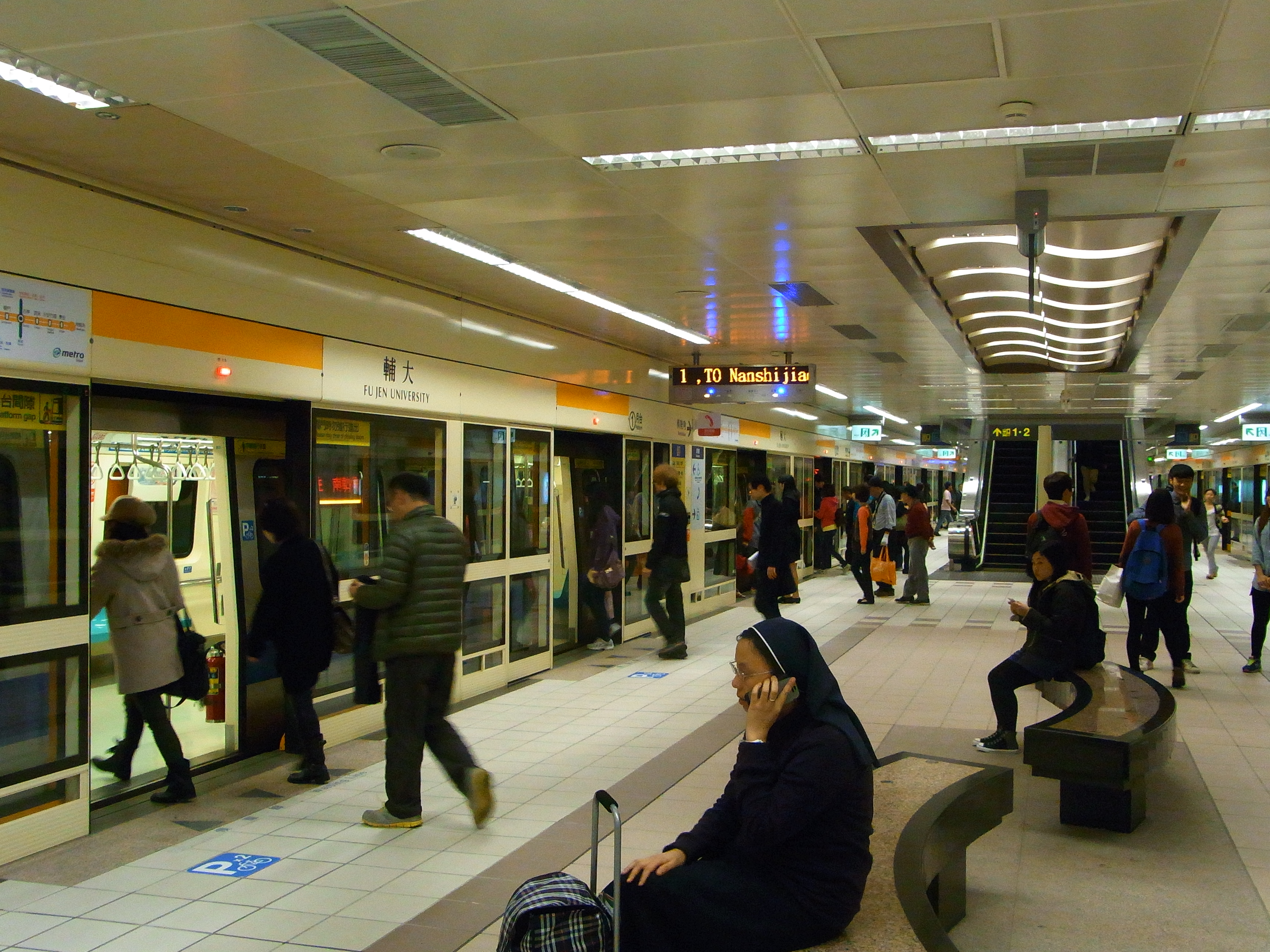
- Fu Jen University station platform 1

Chinese name
- Traditional Chinese: 輔大
- Simplified Chinese: 辅大
Transcriptions
Standard Mandarin
- Hanyu Pinyin: Fǔdà
- Bopomofo: ㄈㄨˇ ㄉㄚˋ
Hakka
- Pha̍k-fa-sṳ: Phú-thai
Southern Min
- Tâi-lô: Hu-tāi

General information
- Location: B1, No. 510-1, Zhongzheng Rd. Xinzhuang, New Taipei; Taiwan
- Coordinates: 25.0328°N 121.4359°E
- Operator: Taipei Metro
- Line: Zhonghe–Xinlu line
- Connections: Bus stop

Construction
- Structure type: Underground

Other information
- Station code: O19

History
- Opened: 5 January 2012; 14 years ago

Passengers
- 22,751 daily (December 2024)
- Rank: 74 out of 109

Services
Preceding station	Taipei Metro	Following station
Xinzhuang towards Nanshijiao	Zhonghe–Xinlu line	Danfeng towards Huilong
Location

The Taipei Metro Fu Jen University station is a station on the Zhonghe–Xinlu line located in Xinzhuang District, New Taipei, Taiwan. The station opened on 5 January 2012, and is named after the adjoining Fu Jen Catholic University.

== Station overview ==
This two-level, underground station has an island platform. It is located beneath the intersection of Zhongzheng Rd. and Lane 508, Zhongzheng Rd. It was originally scheduled to open in 2013, but it began service earlier on 5 January 2012. It was originally planned as the western terminus of the Xinzhuang Line, hence the station number (O1); the new terminus will instead be Huilong. It served as the western terminus of the Xinzhuang Line when the New Taipei City portion of the Xinzhuang Line opened on January 5, 2012, until Danfeng and Huilong stations opened on June 29, 2013.

=== Construction ===
Evacuation depth for this station was around 19 m (62 ft). It is 199.5 m (655 ft) in length and 16.55 m (54.3 ft) wide. It has four entrances, one accessibility elevator, and two vent shafts.

== Station layout ==
Street level	Entrance/exit	Entrance/exit
B1	Concourse	Lobby, information desk, automatic ticket dispensing machines, one-way faregates
B1	Concourse	Restrooms (inside fare zone, outside fare zone near exit 2)
B2	Platform 1	← Zhonghe–Xinlu line toward Huilong (O20 Danfeng)
B2	Island platform, doors will open on the left
B2	Platform 2	→ Zhonghe–Xinlu line toward Nanshijiao (O18 Xinzhuang) →

=== Exits ===
- Exit 1: Zhongzheng Rd., near the main gate of Fu Jen University
- Exit 2: Fuyin Rd, near Jianguo 1st Rd.
- Exit 3: Zhongzheng Rd., opposite gas station
- Exit 4: Zhongzheng Rd., beside gas station

== Around the station ==
- Fu Jen Catholic University
- San-Chung Bus Company, Sanchong station
- Xinzhuang Branch, Fuying Police Station
