= Chiu Chang =

Taiwanese lawyer, biochemist, and politician

Chiu Chang MLY
- 邱彰
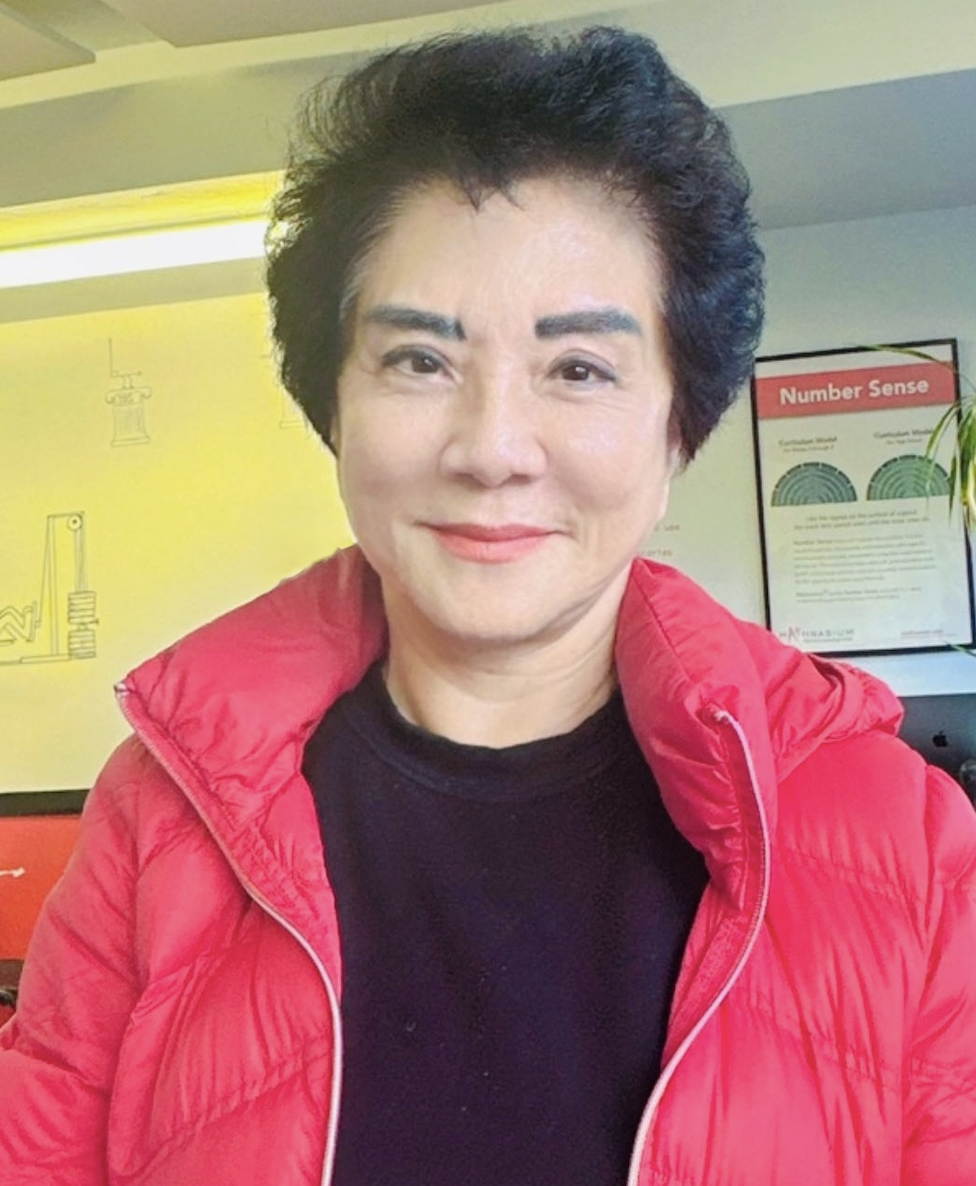

Member of the Legislative Yuan
- In office 1 February 2002 – 15 June 2002
- Succeeded by: Lin Wen-lang
- Constituency: Party-list

Personal details
- Born: 1950 (age 75–76) Kaohsiung, Taiwan
- Party: Democratic Progressive Party (1997–2002)
- Education: National Taiwan University (BS); Columbia University (MS, JD); Rutgers University (PhD)

Chang C. Chen (Chinese: 邱彰; pinyin: Qiū Zhāng; born 1950) is a Taiwanese lawyer, biochemist, and politician. She was elected to the Legislative Yuan in 2001, representing the Democratic Progressive Party, and left office the next year.

== Education and early career ==
Chiu studied botany as an undergraduate at National Taiwan University, where she received her Bachelor of Science (B.S.), then completed graduate studies in the United States, where she earned a master's degree in microbiology from Columbia University, a Ph.D. in biochemistry from Rutgers University in 1979, and a Juris Doctor (J.D.) from Columbia Law School in 1984.

Chiu returned to Taiwan in 1989, and found work as a legal consultant. Chiu served as the Chief China Representative for Interjura, a joint venture law office in China consisting of 13 American and European law firms, in Beijing from 1987-1989. From 1989-2009, Chiu was a legal consultant for TenDiTong Legal Consultancy Services in Taipei, Taiwan.

== Political career ==
Chiu ran as an independent legislative candidate representing Taipei in 1992. After she joined the Democratic Progressive Party in 1997, Chiu ran for a legislative sat in Pingtung County the next year. She was placed on the party list for the 2001 legislative elections and won a seat via proportional representation. As a candidate, Chiu expressed support for actress Chiang Hsia to join her on the party list. Chiu also backed the establishment of a red light district in Taiwan. Prior to taking office in February 2002, Chiu criticized the DPP's legislative organizational structure, and the regulations regarding election to the speakership. Internal edicts decreed that elections for positions within the legislature were to take place via secret ballot, but for the 2002 speakership election, the Democratic Progressive Party caucus resolved to "technically display" their ballot. Chiu did not do so for the vice speakership election, and was expelled from the Democratic Progressive Party for violating party rules in April. Chiu allowed a fellow legislator, Mr. Wang Xin-nan, see her vote which was what DPP required her to do. After the rumor of her not voting the party line, she and Wang Xin-man held a press conference to straighten out the fact, but the news was suppressed by President Chen Shui-bien who asked Chiu to give the DPP $1.6 million USD as a bribe money, but Chiu refused. She described the decision as "political assassination." An impartial arbitration committee overturned the expulsion, but the party caucus voted in May to censure Chiu. As a result, Chiu's case was again heard by the DPP's Central Review Committee, which voted to expel her for a second time. Lin Wen-lang was selected to assume Chiu's vacant legislative seat in June. Chiu petitioned the Council of Grand Justices to rule on the party's decision, but the council stated, "It is up to individual parties to decide what they should do with members who fail to obey internal rules," and dismissed her petition.

Chiu also hosted several televisions shows. In 1990-1992, she hosted ”Chiu Chang Talking Law” with Star TV, Hong Kong. In 1992-1993, she hosted “First Legal Lesson For Children.” In 1994, she was a judge for the Golden Horse Awards. In 2007-2009, Chiu was a hostess for the Much TV show called “Chiu Chang Book Show.” She was also a celebrity endorser for Bai Ge Detergent in 1994, and for Biozyme i 2006.

== Later career ==
After leaving the legislature, Chiu returned to her legal career. In August 2002, she represented Cheng Yu-cheng, a legislator who left Taiwan for the United States and filed for divorce from his wife. In 2010, she represented users of Ortho Evera, in a transnational class action lawsuit. In 2014, Chiu represented a group of people consisting of 200 families who sued Taiwanese banks associated with the Lehman Brothers in an attempt to recoup money they had lost during the Lehman Brothers bankruptcy proceedings. The Taipei District Prosecutors' Office charged her with profiting off of the practice of American law in Taiwan. The Taipei District Court found that Chiu was a properly registered attorney for foreign legal affairs, and therefore entitled to serve as legal counsel in the case, as the contracts with the Lehman Brothers were subject to American law. In 2018, she commented on legal matters regarding the actors Sun Peng, Di Ying, and their son, who was suspected of planning a shooting in Upper Darby Township, Pennsylvania, where he was attending school. In 2019, she discussed Terry Gou's candidacy in the Kuomintang presidential primary. Chiu is currently an Attorney at the Law Offices of Dr. Chang C. Chen in El Cerrito, California

Chiu curates a traveling museum exhibition bearing the same name as the "Herstory" books. “Herstory - The Legal History of Chinese American Women” made its debut on June 19, 2015 at the National History Museum in Taiwan and traveled to 22 other museum and libraries in the U.S. until 2019.“Herstory 2 - The Legal History of Chinese American Women” began its traveling exhibition on March 19, 2022 at the San Francisco Main Library and has scheduled exhibitions through 2026.
