= Taipei Hospital =

Hospital in Xinzhuang, New Taipei, Taiwan

Taipei Hospital 衛生福利部臺北醫院
- Ministry of Health and Welfare
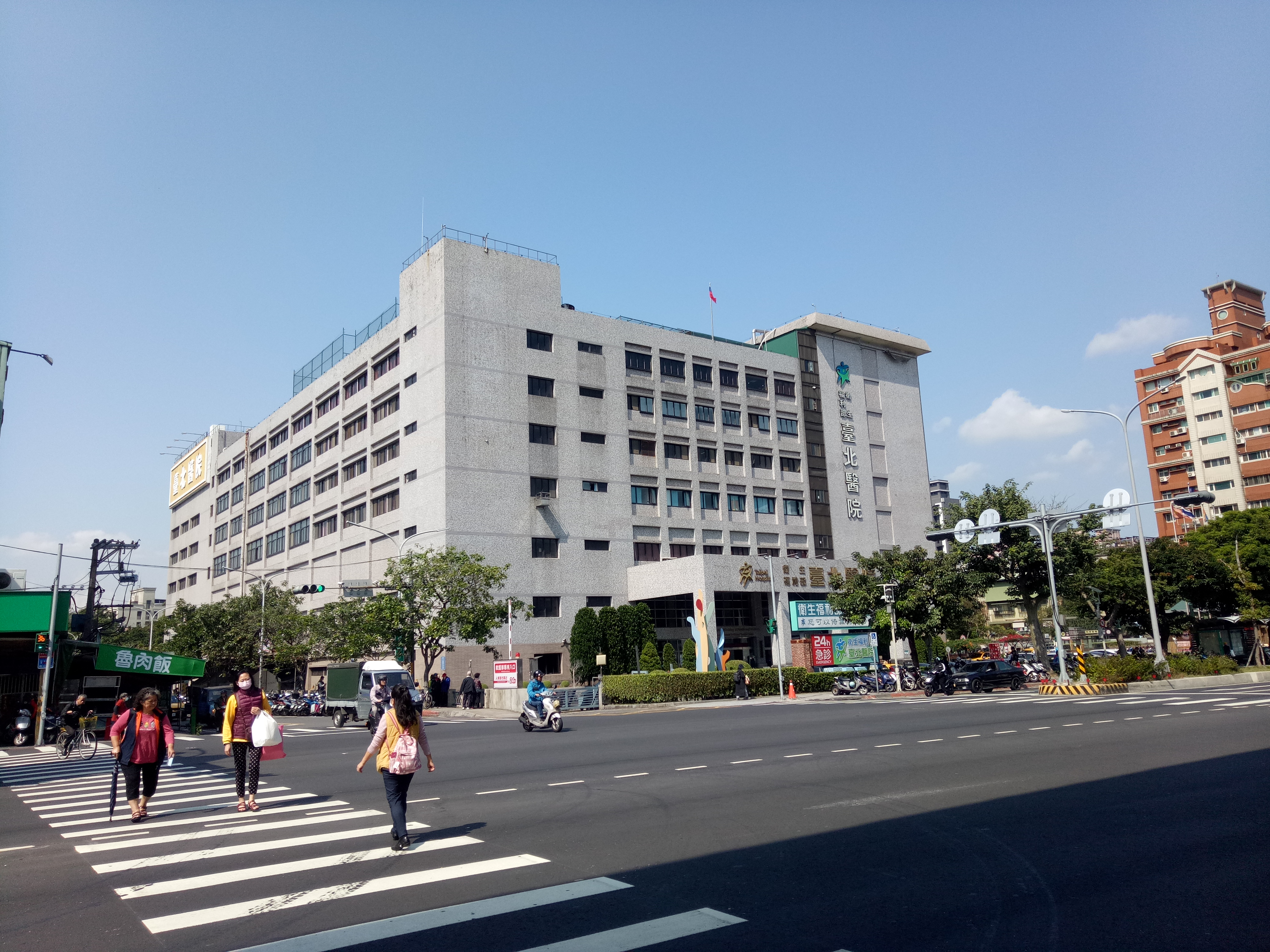

Geography
- Location: Xinzhuang, New Taipei, Taiwan
- Coordinates: 25°02′34.1″N 121°27′33.0″E

Organisation
- Type: public hospital

History
- Founded: 1972

The Taipei Hospital (traditional Chinese: 衛生福利部臺北醫院; simplified Chinese: 卫生福利部台北医院; pinyin: Wèishēng Fúlì Bù Táiběi Yīyuàn) is a public hospital in Xinzhuang District, New Taipei, Taiwan.

== History ==
The hospital was established in 1972. On 13 August 2018, a fire broke out at the senior care center on the seventh floor of the hospital which caused 9 fatalities and 30 injuries. The cause of the fire was found to be a short circuit on hospital bed 235 inside ward 7A23.

== Transportation ==
The hospital is accessible within walking distance north of Touqianzhuang Station of Taipei Metro.

== See also ==
- List of hospitals in Taiwan
