= Lee-Ming Institute of Technology =

University in Taishan, New Taipei, Taiwan

Lee-ming Institute of Technology
- 黎明技術學院
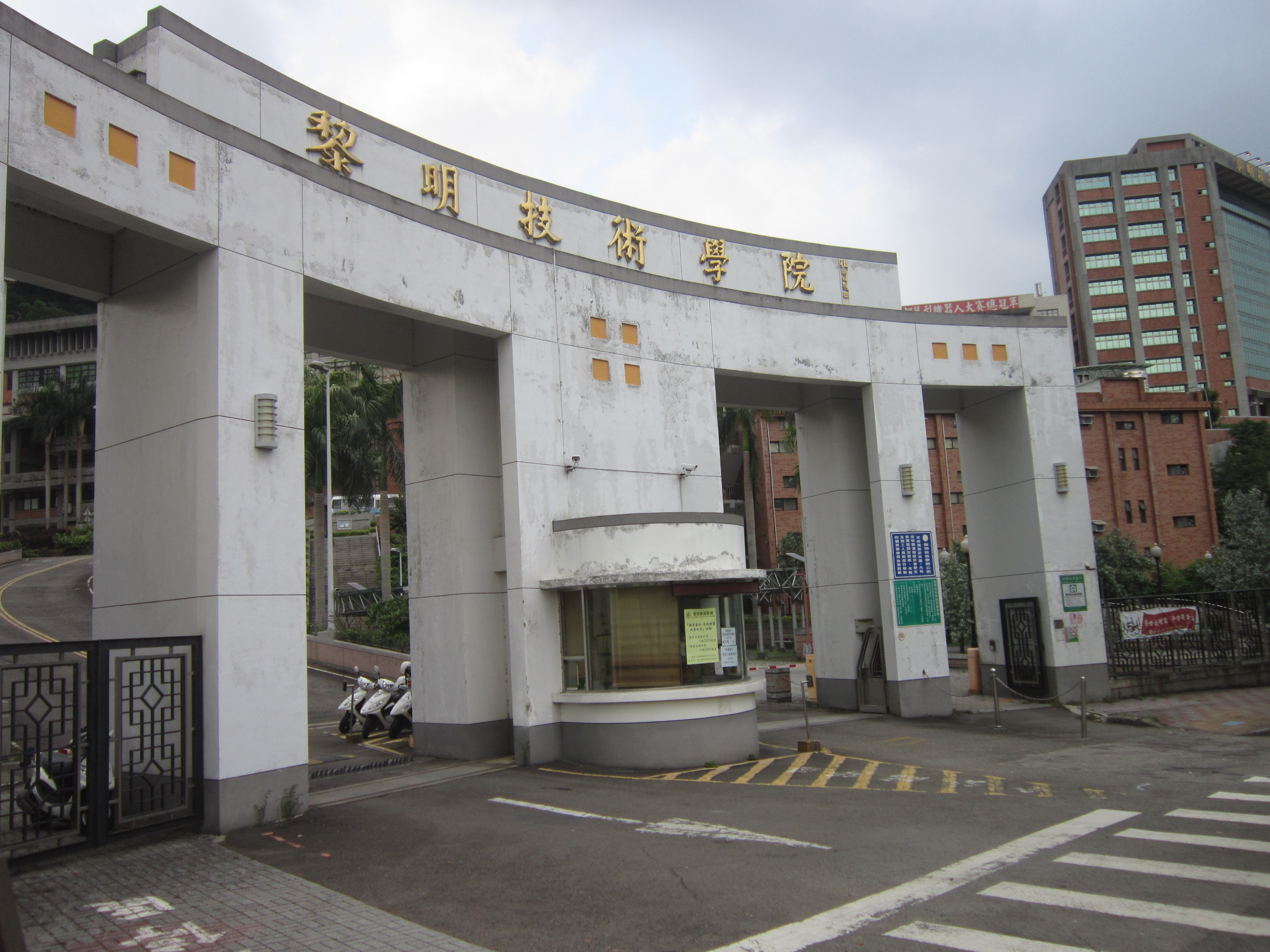
- Type: private
- Established: 1969
- Location: Taishan, New Taipei, Taiwan; 25.065284°N 121.419149°E
- Website: Official website

Lee-Ming Institute of Technology
- Traditional Chinese: 黎明技術學院
Transcriptions
Standard Mandarin
- Hanyu Pinyin: Límíng Jìshù Xuéyuàn
Southern Min
- Hokkien POJ: Lê-bêng Ki-su̍t Ha̍k-īⁿ

Lee-ming Institute of Technology (LIT; Chinese: 黎明技術學院; pinyin: Límíng Jìshù Xuéyuàn; Pe̍h-ōe-jī: Lê-bêng Ki-su̍t Ha̍k-īⁿ) is a private university located in Taishan District, New Taipei, Taiwan.

LIT is accredited by the Ministry of Education in Taiwan and offers a range of undergraduate and graduate programs in various fields. LIT offers degree programs in a variety of disciplines, including engineering, business management, computer science, and design.

The programs are designed to provide students with practical skills and knowledge that are relevant to the current job market.

== History ==
The university was established in 1969.

== Faculties ==
- College of arts
- College of engineering and services
- College of fashion and creativity
- College of tourism and food

== Transportation ==
The station is accessible north of Danfeng Station of Taipei Metro.

== See also ==
- List of universities in Taiwan
