= New Taipei Municipal DanFeng High School =

School in New Taipei, Taiwan

Coordinates: 25.0214°N 121.4165°E

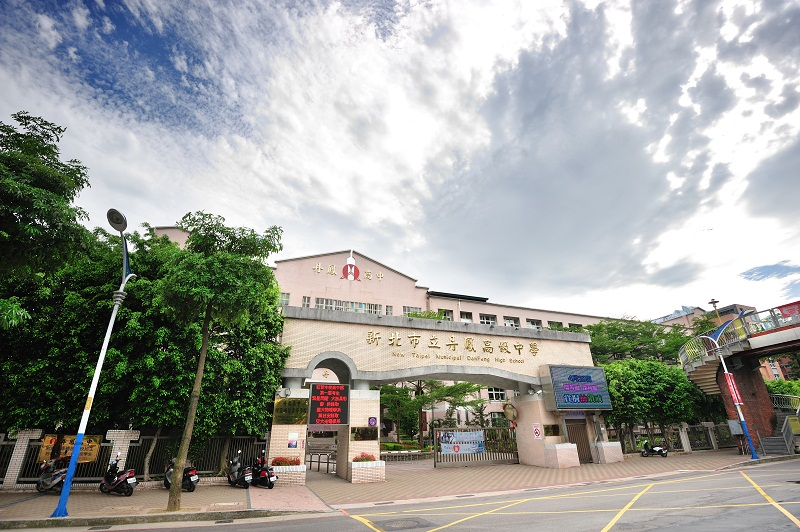
DanFeng High School

The New Taipei Municipal DanFeng High School is a school in Xinzhuang District, New Taipei, Taiwan.

== School ==
Situated at the junction of Southern Xinzhuang and Linkou Terrace, the area between Shuangfeng Mountain and Mudan Mountain was considered an excellent location by Feng shui experts.Danfeng district was, in fact, named after the two mountains. Since the 1960s, because of its great location, the population in Danfeng district had constantly increased. In 1986, the population had increased even drastically. In order to meet the increasing population's needs, Taipei County Danfeng junior high school was then established as the second junior high school in this district. Over the past two decades, thanks to the efforts made by all the precedent principals and the present principal, Xiu-Jyu Gu, the school has successfully overcome such difficult situations as small number of classes, inconvenient transportation, and high teacher turnover rate. It has now been receiving approval from the wide community. Considering the scarcity of high schools in Xinzhuang area, local elective representatives and parents urged the local government to reorganize Danfeng Junior High into a six-year high school. The school was then reformed into Taipei County Danfeng senior high school on August 1, 2007 (and was then reformed into New Taipei Municipal Danfeng senior high school in 2010), becoming the first six-year high school in Xinzhuang.

The campus occupies 31,683 square meters. It encompassed a main building, Caixia building and Hanhai building. The main building is five-story building with a modern design. The construction of Caixia building was finished in July, 2007. The building serves the purposes of offering ample space for teaching arts, crafts and home economics. Hanhai building is a robust complex with multiple functions. It features an integration of a library, science labs, and a gym in one building. To make more space effectively used for teaching activities, the design of underground parking lots was adopted. The building was also designed to be constructed with green building materials and reclaimed building materials, creating a new landscape of architecture in Xinzhuang area.

The school provides students with high-quality and diverse learning environments. The students are well served with labs and classrooms for various teaching and learning activities, including biology, physics and chemistry, home economics, music, arts, earth science, crafts and languages, audio-visual classrooms, computer labs, a library and cloud classrooms.

The school also offers recreational facilities such as sports ground, basketball court and tennis court.

== See also ==
- Education in Taiwan
