= Danfeng metro station =

Metro station in New Taipei, Taiwan

Danfeng 丹鳳
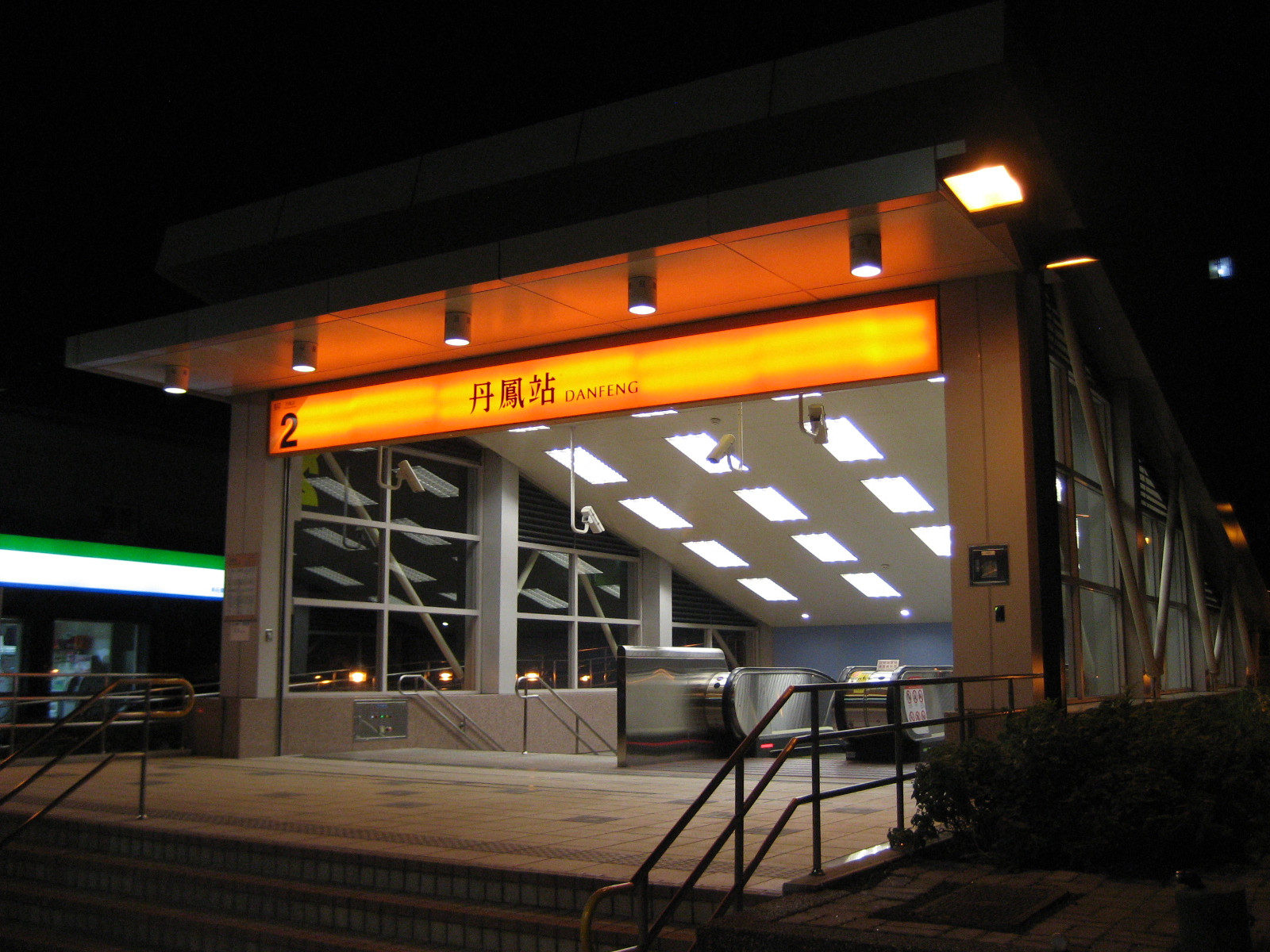

Chinese name
- Traditional Chinese: 丹鳳
- Simplified Chinese: 丹凤
Transcriptions
Standard Mandarin
- Hanyu Pinyin: Dānfèng
- Bopomofo: ㄉㄢ ㄈㄥˋ
Hakka
- Pha̍k-fa-sṳ: Tân-fung
Southern Min
- Tâi-lô: Tān-hōng

General information
- Other names: Station platform
- Location: Xinzhuang and Taishan, New Taipei; Taiwan
- Coordinates: 25.0289°N 121.4227°E
- Operator: Taipei Metro
- Line: Zhonghe–Xinlu line

Construction
- Structure type: Underground

Other information
- Station code: O20

History
- Opened: 29 June 2013; 13 years ago

Passengers
- 18,746 daily (December 2024)
- Rank: 82 out of 109

Services
Preceding station	Taipei Metro	Following station
Fu Jen University towards Nanshijiao	Zhonghe–Xinlu line	Huilong Terminus
Location

The Taipei Metro Danfeng station is a station on the Zhonghe–Xinlu line located on the border of Xinzhuang and Taishan District, New Taipei City, Taiwan. The station opened on 29 June 2013.

== Station overview ==
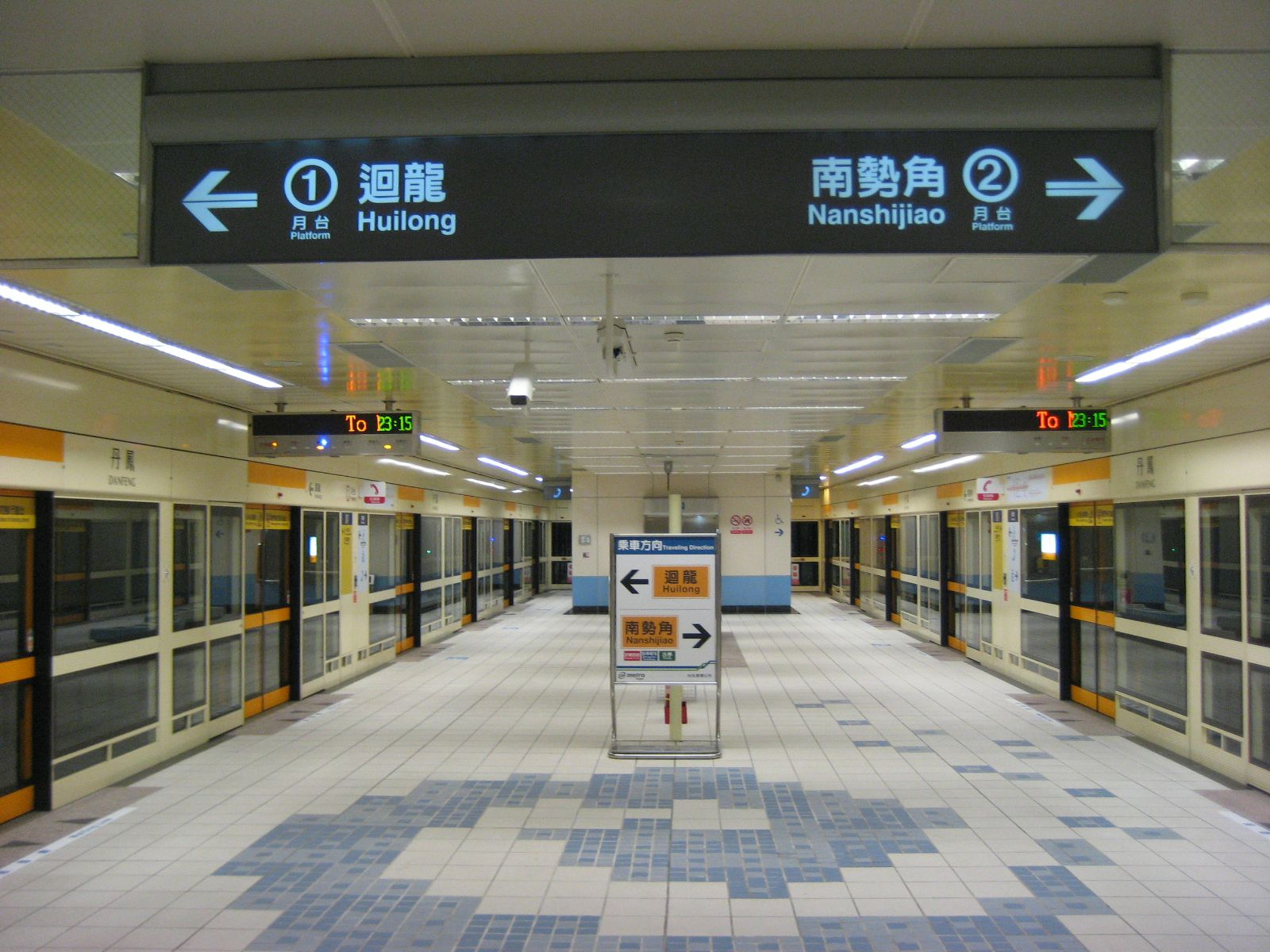
Platform

This two-level, underground station has an island platform. It is located beneath the intersection of Zhongzheng Rd. and Min-an Rd.

The western terminus for the Xinzhuang Line was originally planned to be at Fu Jen University. However, the line was changed and further extended to the west.

=== Construction ===
Excavation depth for this station is around 19 meters. It is 150 meters in length and 16.55 meters wide. It has two entrances, one accessibility elevator, and two vent shafts. It also has one emergency exit.

== Station layout ==
Street level	Entrance/exit	Entrance/exit
B1	Concourse	Lobby, information desk, automatic ticket dispensing machines, one-way faregates
B1	Concourse	Restrooms (inside fare zone, outside fare zone near exit 2)
B2	Platform 1	← Zhonghe–Xinlu line toward Huilong (O21 Terminus)
B2	Island platform, doors will open on the left
B2	Platform 2	→ Zhonghe–Xinlu line toward Nanshijiao (O19 Fu Jen University) →

== Around the station ==
- B&Q, Xinzhuang Store
- Fu-Ying Junior High School
- Lee-Ming Institute of Technology
