= Taishan District, New Taipei =

District in Taichung, Taiwan

Taishan 泰山區
- District
- Taishan District
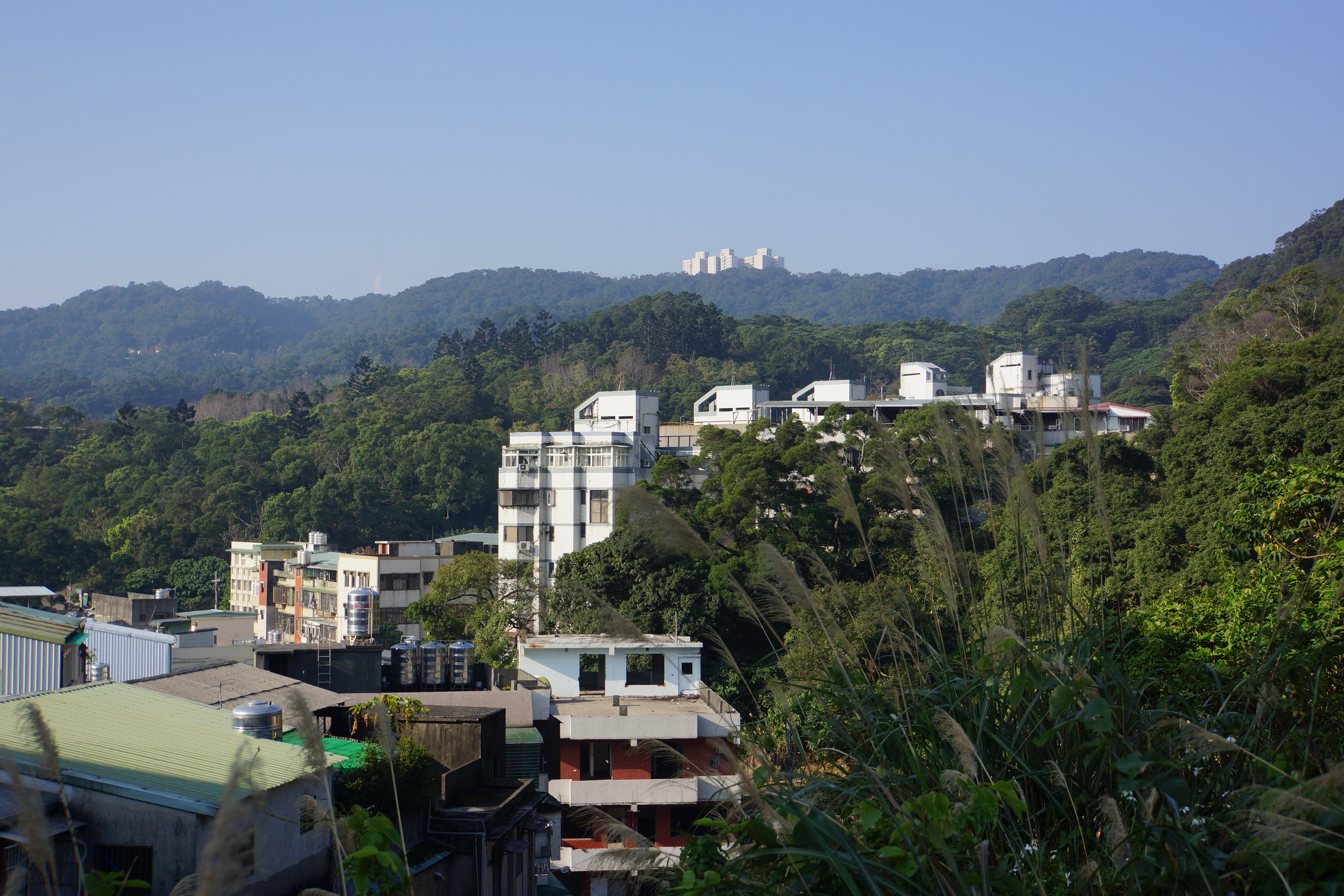

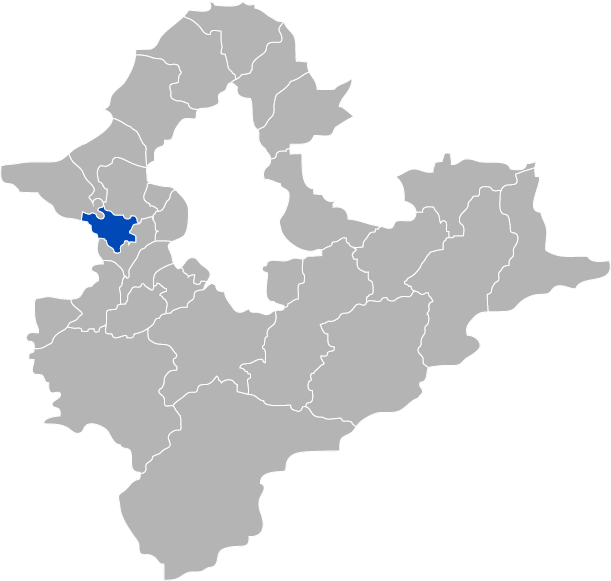
- Taishan District in New Taipei City
- Coordinates: 025°05′N 121°26′E
- Country: Republic of China (Taiwan)
- Special municipality: New Taipei City

Population (February 2023)
  - Total: 77,169
- Time zone: +8
- Website: www.taishan.ntpc.gov.tw (in Chinese)

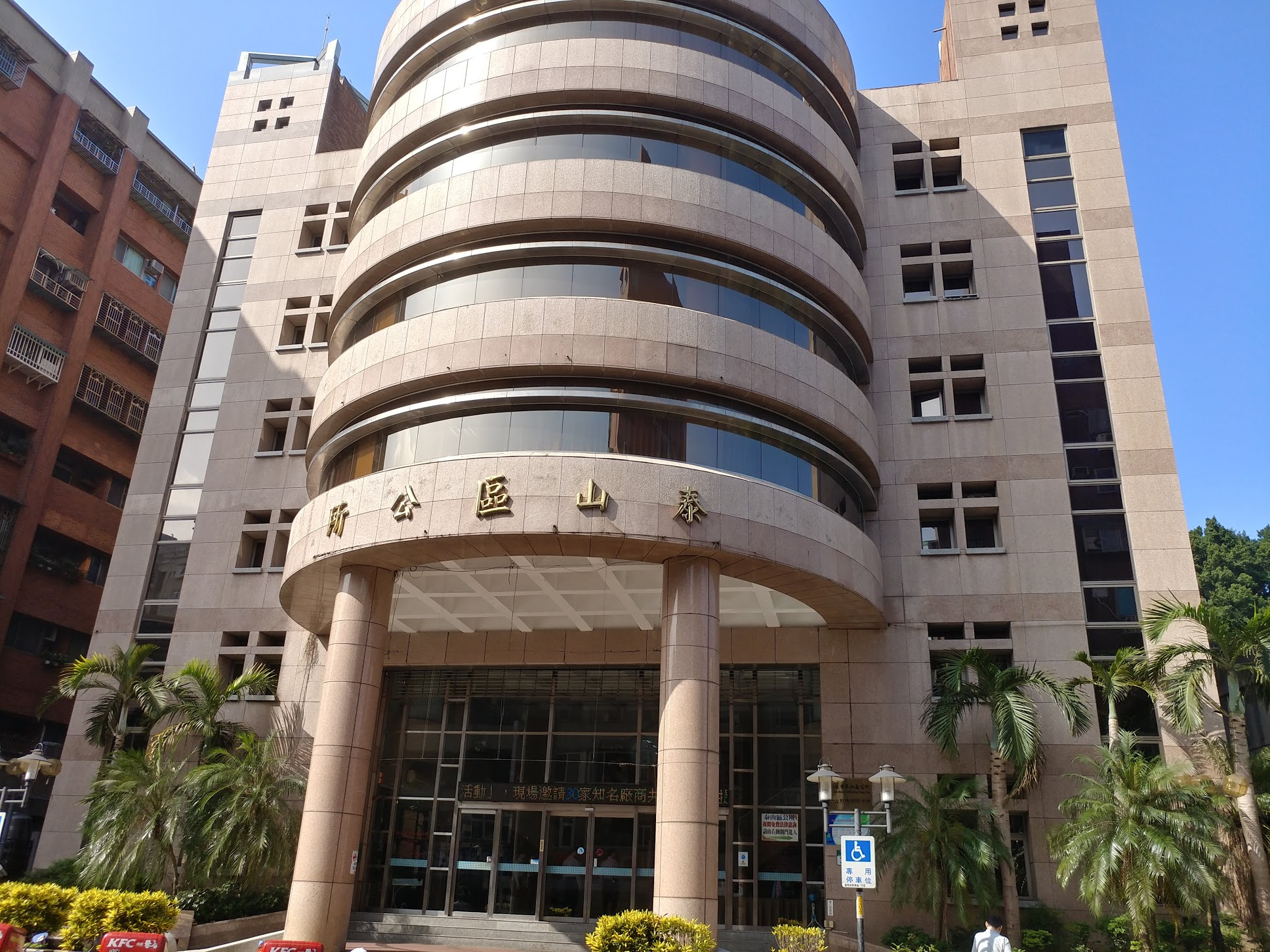
Taishan District Office

Taishan District (Chinese: 泰山區; pinyin: Tàishān Qū; Pe̍h-ōe-jī: Thài-san-khu) is a district home to 77,169 people in New Taipei, Taiwan.

== History ==
Taishan was formerly a rural township. On December 25, 2010, after Taipei County was upgraded to New Taipei City, Taishan Township was upgraded to Taishan District.

== Geography ==
- Area: 19.16 km^{2}
- Population: 77,169 people (February 2023)

Taishan borders Wugu, Linkou, and Xinzhuang districts of New Taipei City, as well as Guishan District of Taoyuan City.

== Infrastructures ==
- Fu Jen Catholic University Hospital

== Government agencies ==
- Freeway Bureau

== Education ==
=== Higher education ===
- Lee-Ming Institute of Technology
- Ming Chi University of Technology

=== High school ===
- New Taipei Municipal Taishan Senior High School (新北市立泰山高級中學)

=== Junior high school ===
- New Taipei Municipal Taishan Junior High School (新北市立泰山國民中學)
- New Taipei Municipal Yi Shiue Junior High School (新北市立義學國民中學)

=== Elementary school ===
- New Taipei Municipal Taishan Elementary School (新北市立泰山國民小學) 新北市泰山區泰山國民小學 - 新北市泰山國小
- New Taipei Municipal Ming-Zhi Elementary School (新北市立明志國民小學) 新北市泰山區明志國小
- New Taipei Municipal Tong-Zong Elementary School 新北市泰山區同榮國民小學
- New Taipei Municipal Yi Shiue Elementary School

=== Library ===
- New Taipei City Library Taishan Guizi Branch
- New Taipei City Library Taishan Branch
- New Taipei City Library Taishan Parent-Child Reading Room

== Tourist attractions ==
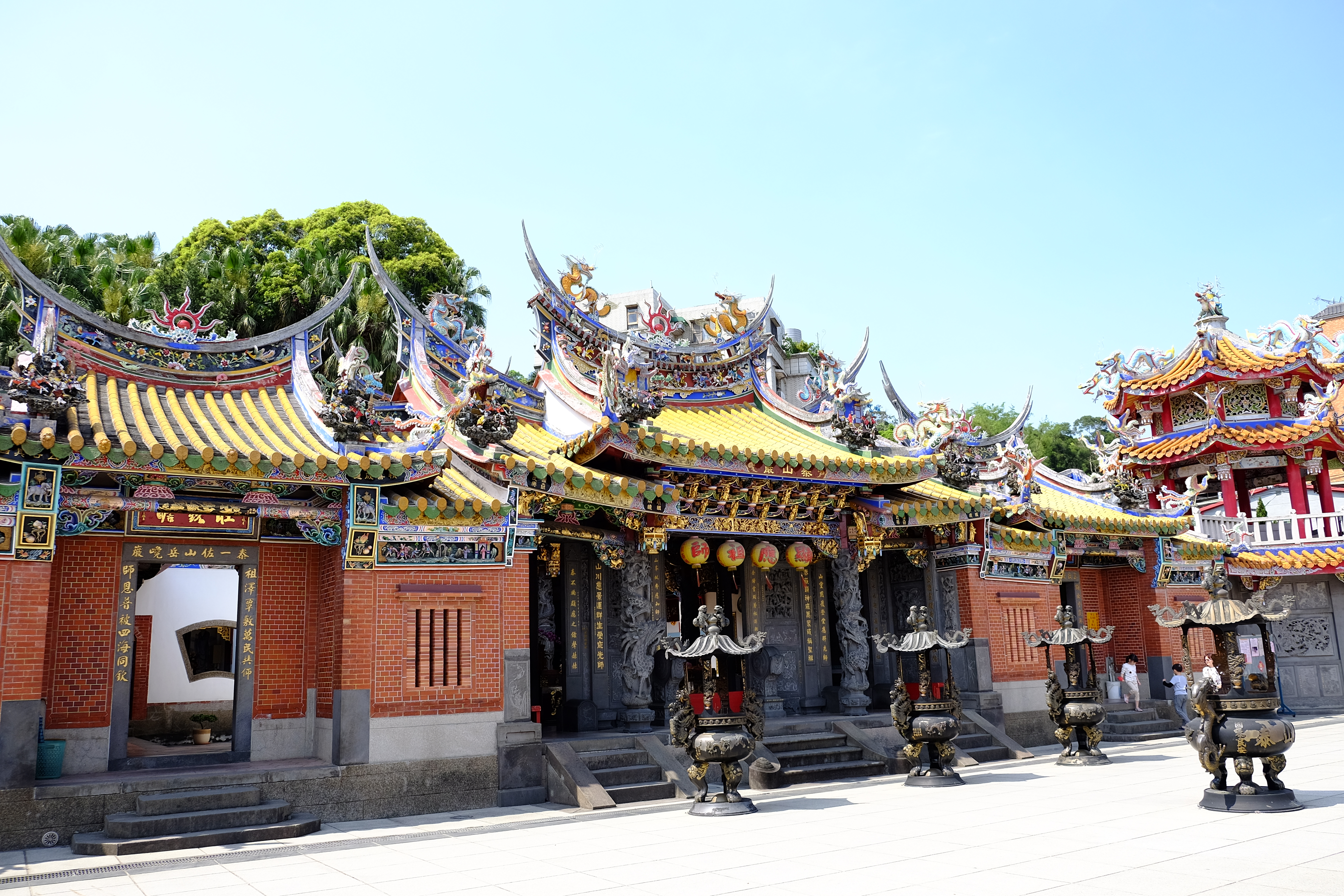
Upper Taishan Temple

- Mingzhi Academy
- Cultural and Historical Image Park
- Ci Xiu Park
- Taishan Doll Museum
- Upper Taishan Temple
- Yihuekeng Natural Ecological Park
- Fu-Da Night Market (Near the backdoor of Fu Jen Catholic University)

== Transportation ==
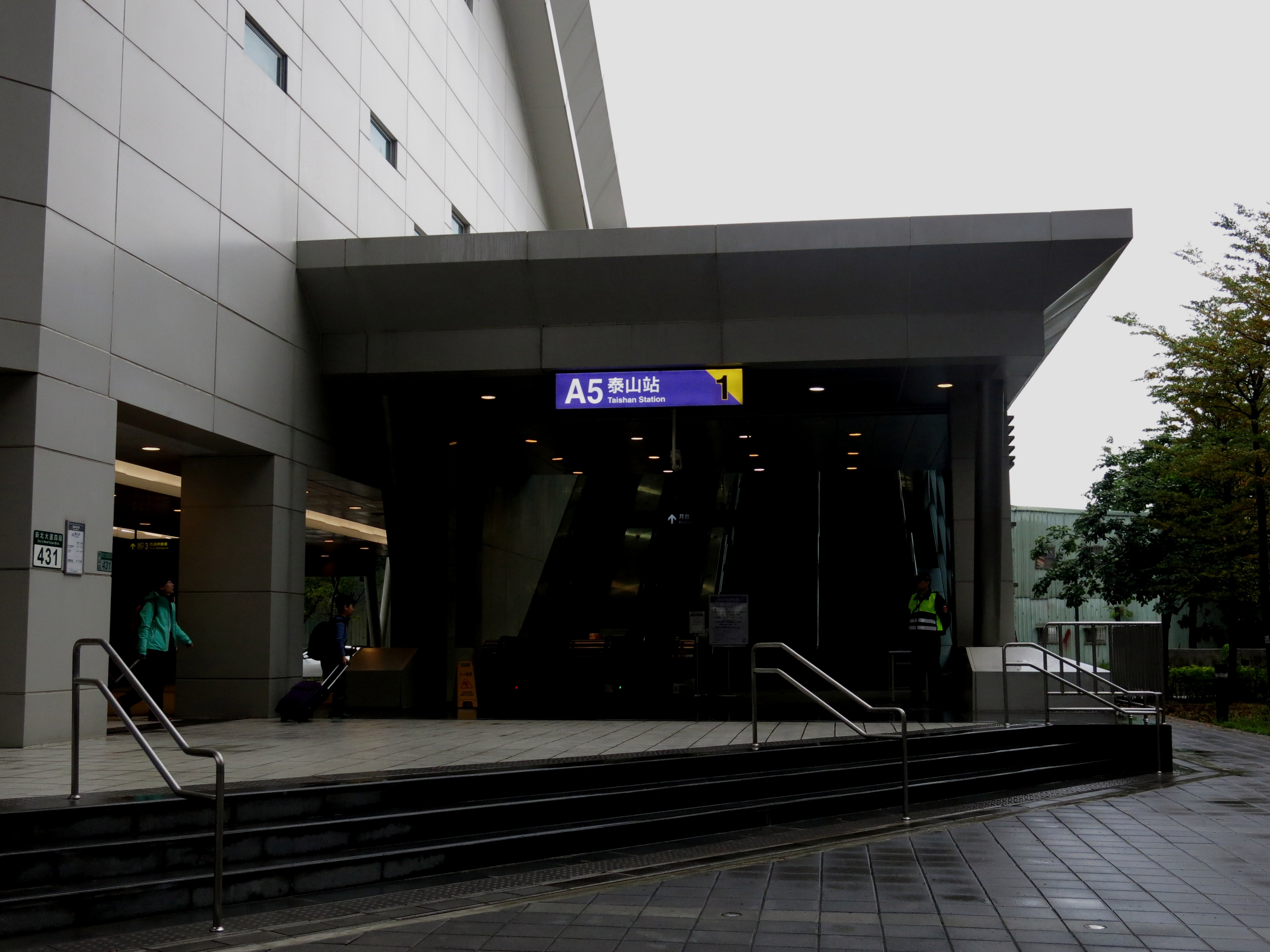
Taishan metro station

- Taishan is served by the National Highway No. 1.

=== Taipei Metro ===
- Danfeng Station

=== Taoyuan Airport MRT ===
- Taishan metro station
- Taishan Guihe metro station

== Notable natives ==
- Lee Hong-yuan, Minister of the Interior (2012-2014)

== See also ==
- New Taipei City
