= Mingzhi Academy =

Former tutorial academy in Taishan, New Taipei, Taiwan

Mingzhi Academy 明志書院
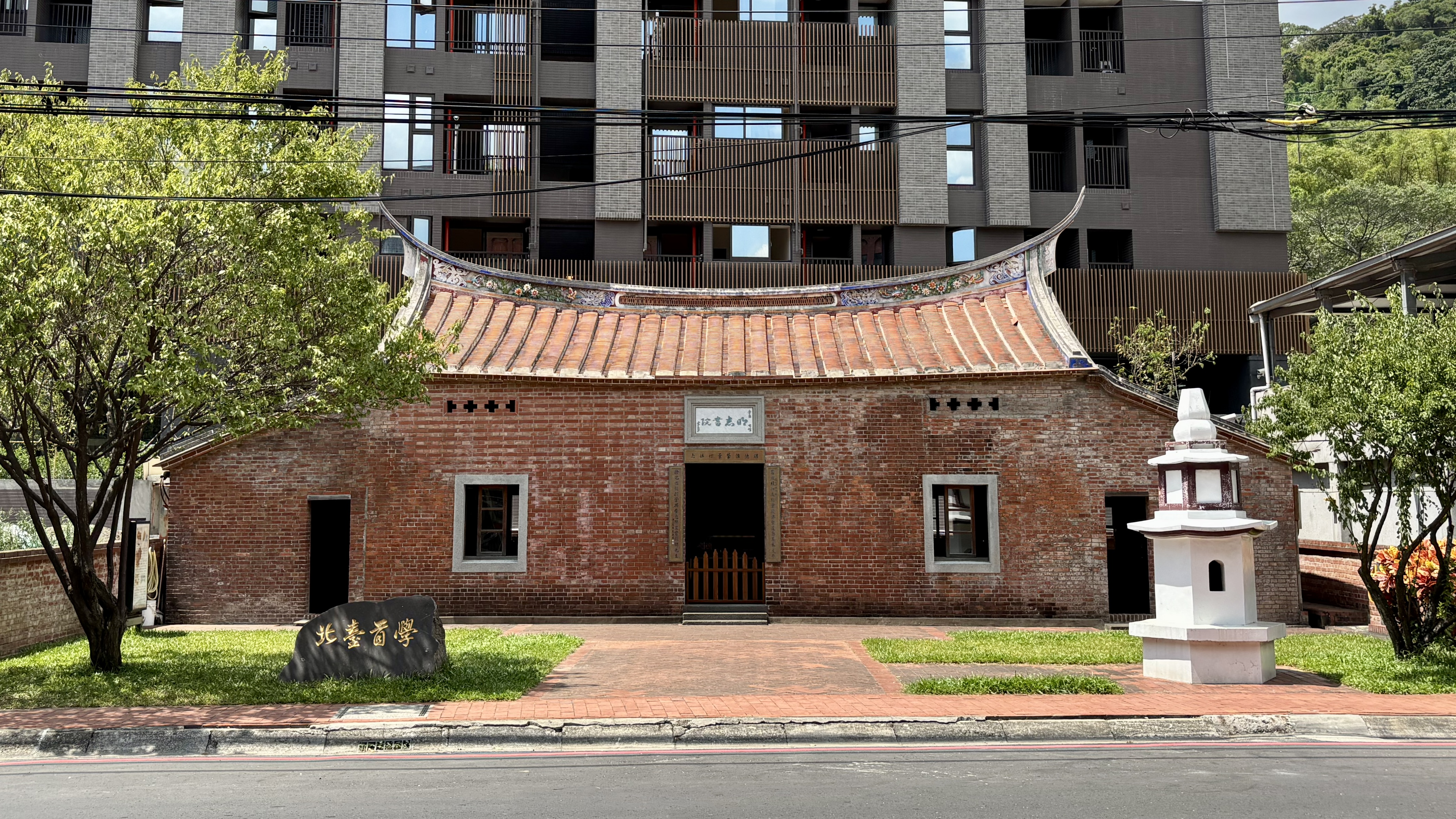

Location
- Taishan, New Taipei, Taiwan
- 25°02′49.2″N 121°25′35.8″E

Information
- Type: former academy
- Established: 1763

The Mingzhi Academy (traditional Chinese: 明志書院; simplified Chinese: 明志书院; pinyin: Míngzhì Shūyuàn) is a former academy during the Qing Dynasty rule of Taiwan in Taishan District, New Taipei, Taiwan.

== History ==
The academy was founded in 1763 by Hu Chuo-yo who came from Yongding, Fujian in which he donated the land and raised funds. The academy building collapsed in 2003 and was subsequently restored.

== Architecture ==
The two side walls of the building features the introduction to the history and architecture of the academy.

== See also ==
- List of tourist attractions in Taiwan
