= Touqianzhuang metro station =

Metro station in New Taipei, Taiwan

Touqianzhuang / 頭前庄
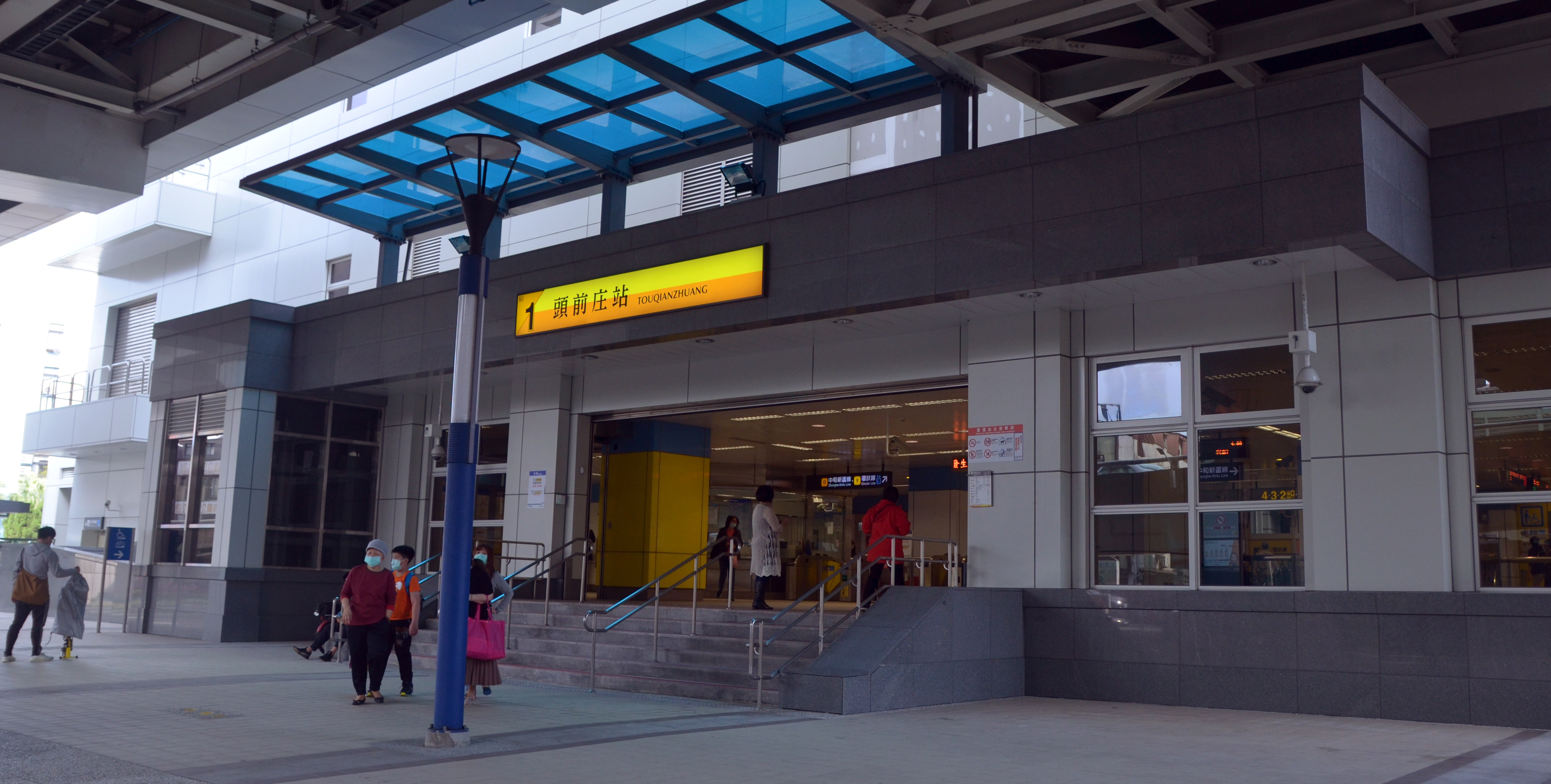

Chinese name
- Traditional Chinese: 頭前庄
- Simplified Chinese: 头前庄
Transcriptions
Standard Mandarin
- Hanyu Pinyin: Tóuqiánzhuāng
- Bopomofo: ㄊㄡˊㄑㄧㄢˊㄓㄨㄤ
- Wade–Giles: T'ou²-ch'ien²-chuang¹
Hakka
- Pha̍k-fa-sṳ: Thèu-chhièn-chông
Southern Min
- Tâi-lô: Thâu-tsîng-tsng

General information
- Other names: Taipei Hospital; 臺北醫院
- Location: B1, No. 18, Siyuan Rd. Xinzhuang, New Taipei; Taiwan
- Coordinates: 25.0392°N 121.4606°E
- Operator: Taipei Metro and New Taipei Metro
- Lines: Zhonghe–Xinlu line (O17); Circular line (Y18)
- Connections: Bus stop

Construction
- Structure type: Underground (Zhonghe-Xinlu Line) / Elevated (Circular Line)

Other information
- Station code: /

History
- Opened: 5 January 2012

Passengers
- 19,530 daily (December 2024)
- Rank: (Ranked 84 of 119)

Services
Preceding station	Taipei Metro	Following station
Xianse Temple towards Nanshijiao	Zhonghe–Xinlu line	Xinzhuang towards Huilong
Preceding station	New Taipei Metro	Following station
Xinpu Minsheng towards Dapinglin	Circular line	Xingfu towards NT Industrial Park
Location

The Taipei Metro and New Taipei Metro Touqianzhuang station is a station on the Zhonghe–Xinlu line located in Xinzhuang District, New Taipei, Taiwan. It opened for service on 5 January 2012. The elevated Circular line platforms opened on 31 January 2020.

== Station overview ==
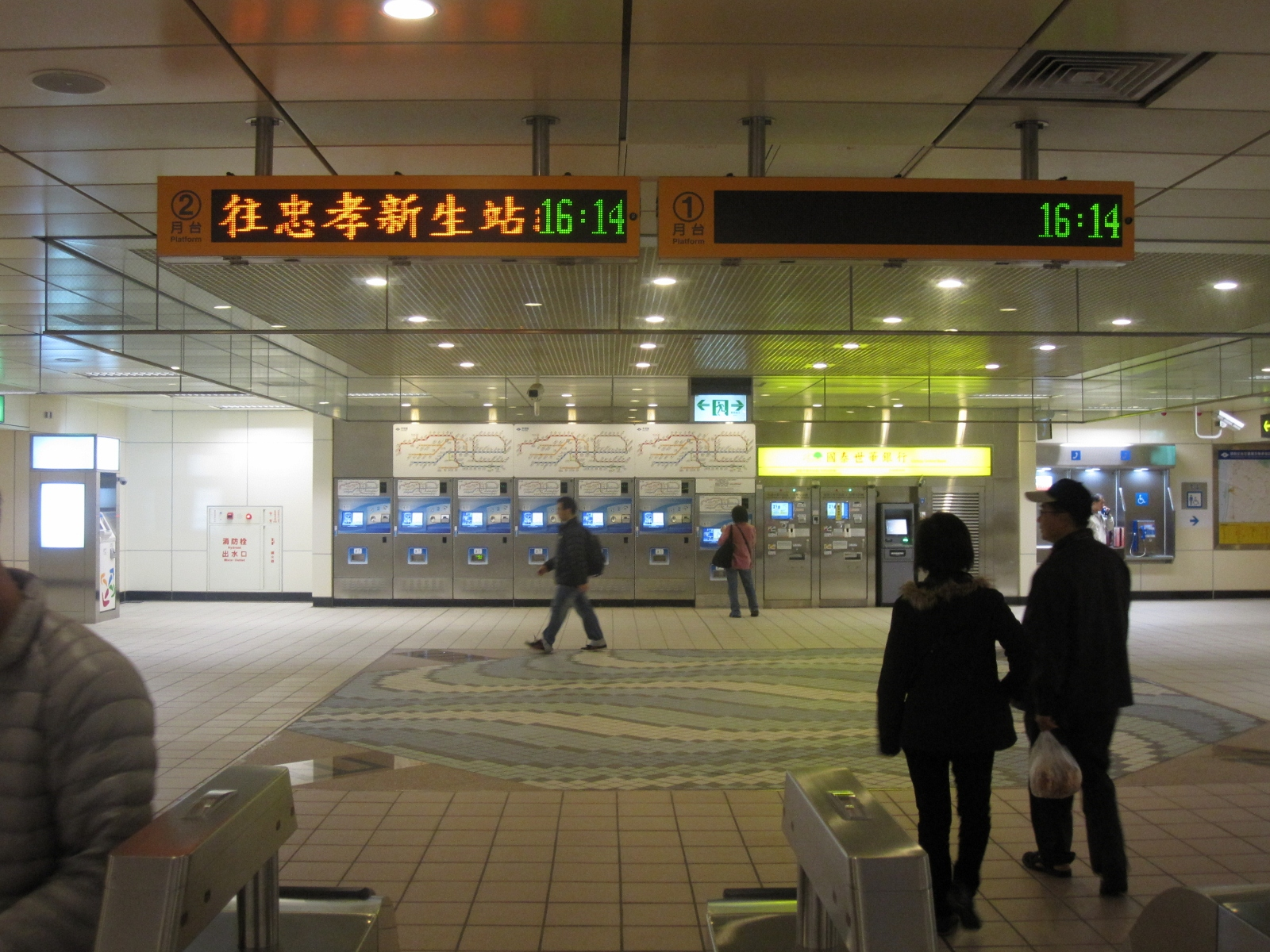
Ticketing area

This three-level, underground station has an island platform and two side platforms. It is located beneath the intersection of Zhongzheng Rd. and Siyuan Rd. It was scheduled to open in March 2012 along with most of the Xinzhuang Line, but opened earlier for service on 5 January 2012.

It is a transfer station with the Circular line, which has two elevated platforms. It opened on 31 January 2020.

=== Construction ===
Excavation depth for this station is 24.53 to 25.13 m (80.5 to 82.4 ft). It is 170.85 m (560.5 ft) in length and 17.85 m (58.6 ft) wide. The platform is 141 m (463 ft) meters long. It has six entrances, one accessibility elevator, and two vent shafts. Two of the entrances are connected with an existing pedestrian underpass.

The station was constructed under the existing Siyuan Road pedestrian passage. The location of the station includes many utility pipelines that could not be relocated. Thus, due to the limited construction area, the station was not constructed using the cut-and-cover method employed in other stations. Instead, construction used the pipe jacking method from sidewalks, outer lanes of roads, and the spaces between Dahan Bridge piers.

=== Design ===
The theme for the station is "Thousands of sails: North Taiwan's Xinzhuang port". Entrances are constructed from glass, steel frames, aluminum plates, and metal.

== Station layout ==
4F	Connecting Level	Platforms-connecting overpass
3F	Platform Level	Restrooms (inside paid area)
3F	Side platform, doors will open on the right
3F	Platform 1	← Circular line toward New Taipei Industrial Park (Y19 Xingfu)
3F	Platform 2	→ Circular line toward Dapinglin (Y17 Xinpu Minsheng) →
3F	Side platform, doors will open on the right

Street level	Concourse	Entrance/exit, lobby, information desk, automatic ticket machines, one-way faregates, restrooms (inside paid area)
B1	Concourse	Lobby, information desk, automatic ticket dispensing machines, one-way faregates
B1	Concourse	Restrooms (outside fare zone near exit 1)
B2	Platform 1	← Zhonghe–Xinlu line toward Huilong (O18 Xinzhuang)
B2	Island platform, doors will open on the left
B2	Platform 2	→ Zhonghe–Xinlu line toward Nanshijiao (O16 Xianse Temple) →

=== Exits ===
- Exit 1: No. 18, Siyuan Rd., near Zhongzheng Rd.
- Exit 2: Zhongzheng Rd., near Dahan Bridge
- Exit 3: Zhongzheng Rd.
- Exit 4: Zhongzheng Rd., near Huacheng Rd.

== Around the station ==
- Taipei Hospital (550m northwest of Exit 1)
- IKEA, Xinzhuang Branch (300m northeast of Exit 3)
- Hetai Auto Co., Xinzhuang Research Center
- Dahan Bridge (south of Exit 2)
