= Cheng Yu-cheng =

Taiwanese politician (1946–2025)

Cheng Yu-cheng MLY
- 鄭余鎮

Member of the Legislative Yuan
- In office 1 February 2002 – 31 January 2005
- Constituency: Taipei County 2
- In office 1 February 1990 – 31 January 1993
- In office 1 February 1981 – 31 January 1987

Personal details
- Born: 12 January 1946 Xinzhuang, Taipei County, Taiwan
- Died: 7 January 2025 (aged 78) Zhongzheng, Taipei, Taiwan
- Party: Independent
- Other political affiliations: Democratic Progressive Party (1987–2002); Non-Partisan Solidarity Union (2004–?); National Health Service Alliance (2011–2020)
- Education: National Taipei University of Technology (BS)

Cheng Yu-cheng (Chinese: 鄭余鎮; pinyin: Zhèng Yúzhèn; 12 January 1946 – 7 January 2025) was a Taiwanese politician.

== Background ==
Cheng was born on 12 January 1946. His father Cheng Chien-bang was active in the tangwai movement. The younger Cheng studied at the National Taipei University of Technology. Cheng Yu-cheng died of a heart attack at National Taiwan University Hospital on 7 January 2025, at the age of 78.

== Political career ==
Cheng was raised in what became Xinzhuang District of New Taipei. He began his political career as leader of the area in 1977, before taking a seat on the Legislative Yuan in 1981. He won a second term in 1983, but lost the 1986 elections. Shortly thereafter, Cheng joined the Democratic Progressive Party. He returned to the legislature in 1990 as a DPP representative. Cheng subsequently lost a string of elections until regaining his seat in 2001. In August 2002, Cheng flew to the United States, after he and his legislative aide Sophie Wang had reportedly married in July. He retained former legislative colleague Chiu Chang as his legal representative while seeking a divorce from his wife Lu Pei-ying. However, the divorce was never finalized. Cheng kept his position as a legislator, but left the Democratic Progressive Party in November 2002, days before he was formally expelled. Cheng then became an independent before joining the Non-Partisan Solidarity Union upon its founding in June 2004. He ran for the Legislative Yuan twice thereafter, in the 2004 and 2012 elections.
