= Xinzhuang District =

District of New Taipei, Taiwan

Xinzhuang 新莊區 Shinshō, Sinjhuang, Hsin-Chuang, Hsinchuang
- District
- Xinzhuang District
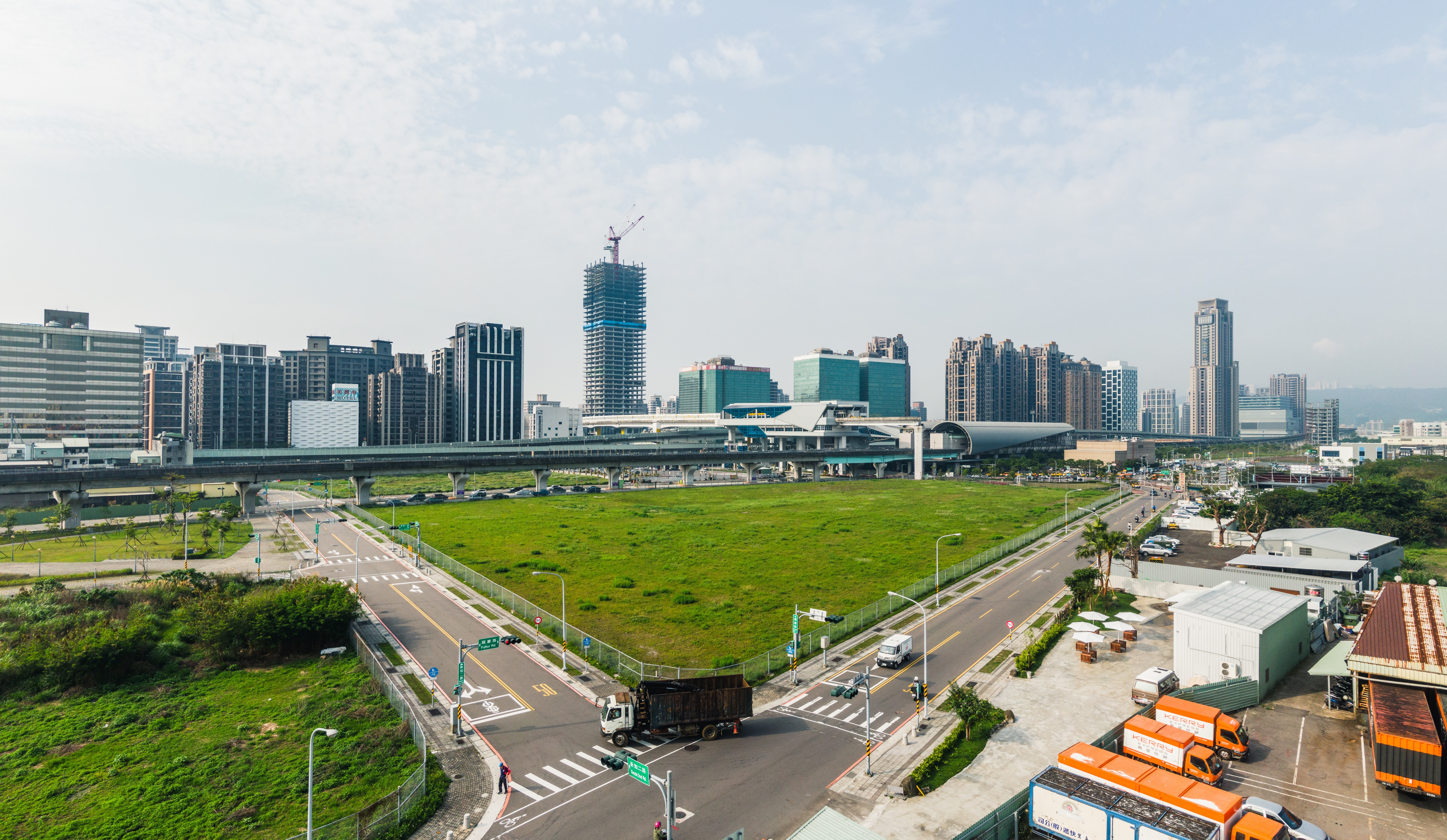

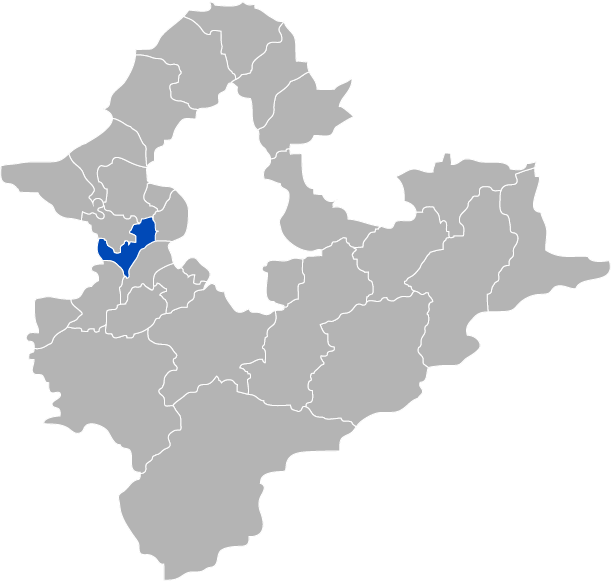
- Xinzhuang District in New Taipei City
- Coordinates: 25°02′N 121°27′E
- Country: Taiwan
- Region: Northern Taiwan
- Special municipality: New Taipei

Area
  - Total: 19.74 km^{2} (7.62 sq mi)

Population (February 2023)
  - Total: 421,248
  - Density: 9,678.14/km^{2} (25,066.3/sq mi)
- Time zone: UTC+8 (CST)
- Postal code: 242
- Website: www.xinzhuang.ntpc.gov.tw (in Chinese)

Xinzhuang District
- Chinese: 新莊區
Transcriptions
Standard Mandarin
- Hanyu Pinyin: Xīnzhuāng Qū
- Bopomofo: ㄒㄧㄣ ㄓㄨㄤ ㄑㄩ
- Wade–Giles: Hsin¹-chuang¹ Chʻü¹
- Tongyong Pinyin: Sinjhuang Cyu
Southern Min
- Hokkien POJ: Sin-chng-khu

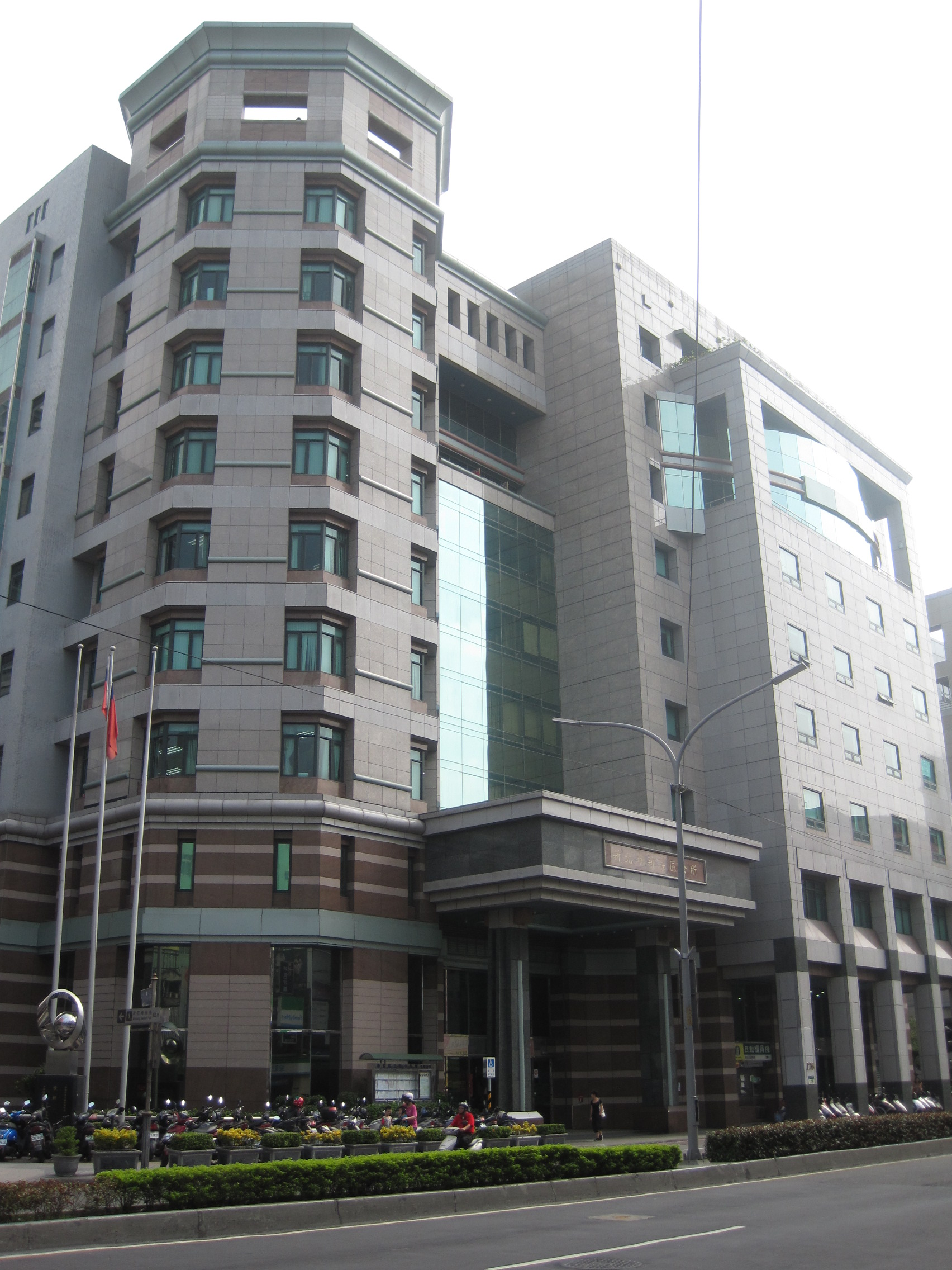
Xinzhuang District office

Xinzhuang District (Chinese: 新莊區; Hanyu Pinyin: Xīnzhuāng Qū; Tongyong Pinyin: Sinjhuang Cyu) is a district in the western part of New Taipei in northern Taiwan. It has an area of 19.74 km^{2} (7.62 mi^{2}) and a population of 421,248 people (February 2023).

== History ==
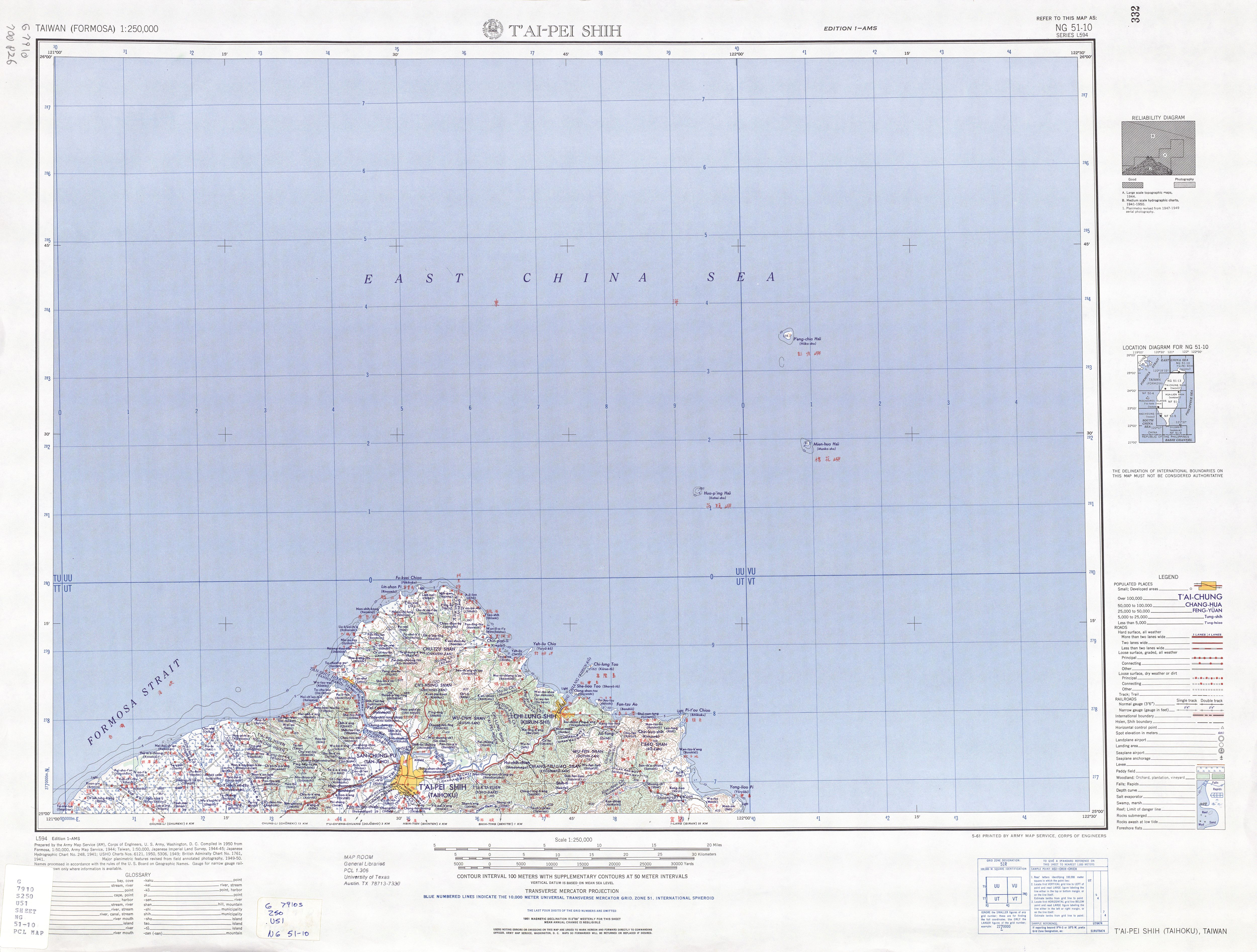
Map including Xinzhuang (labeled as Hsin-chuang-chieh (Shinshōgai) 新莊街) (1950)

A former name of the area is Pulauan (Chinese: 武溜灣; Pe̍h-ōe-jī: Bú-liu-oan). On 15 January 1980, Xinzhuang was upgraded from an urban township to be a county-administered city of Taipei County. On 25 December 2010, Taipei County was upgraded to New Taipei City, and Xinzhuang City was upgraded to a district.

== Overview ==
The district is bordered by Wugu and Taishan to the north, Sanchong to the east, Banqiao and Shulin to the south, and Taoyuan City to the west.

== Government agencies ==
- Council of Indigenous Peoples
- Hakka Affairs Council
- Ministry of Culture

== Educational institutions ==
=== Colleges ===
- Fu Jen Catholic University (天主教輔仁大學)

=== Senior High Schools ===
- New Taipei Municipal DanFeng High School
- New Taipei Municipal Hsinchuang Senior High School
- Heng Yee Catholic High School (天主教恆毅中學)
- National Xinzhuang High School (國立新莊高級中學)

== Infrastructures ==
=== Hospitals ===
- Taipei Hospital

== Tourist attractions ==
- Cihyou Temple
- Losheng Sanatorium
- Siangrenhe Clock and Drum Workshop
- Temple to Erudition Deity
- Temple to the Martial Deity
- Xinzhuang Baseball Stadium
- Xinzhuang Culture and Arts Center

== Transportation ==
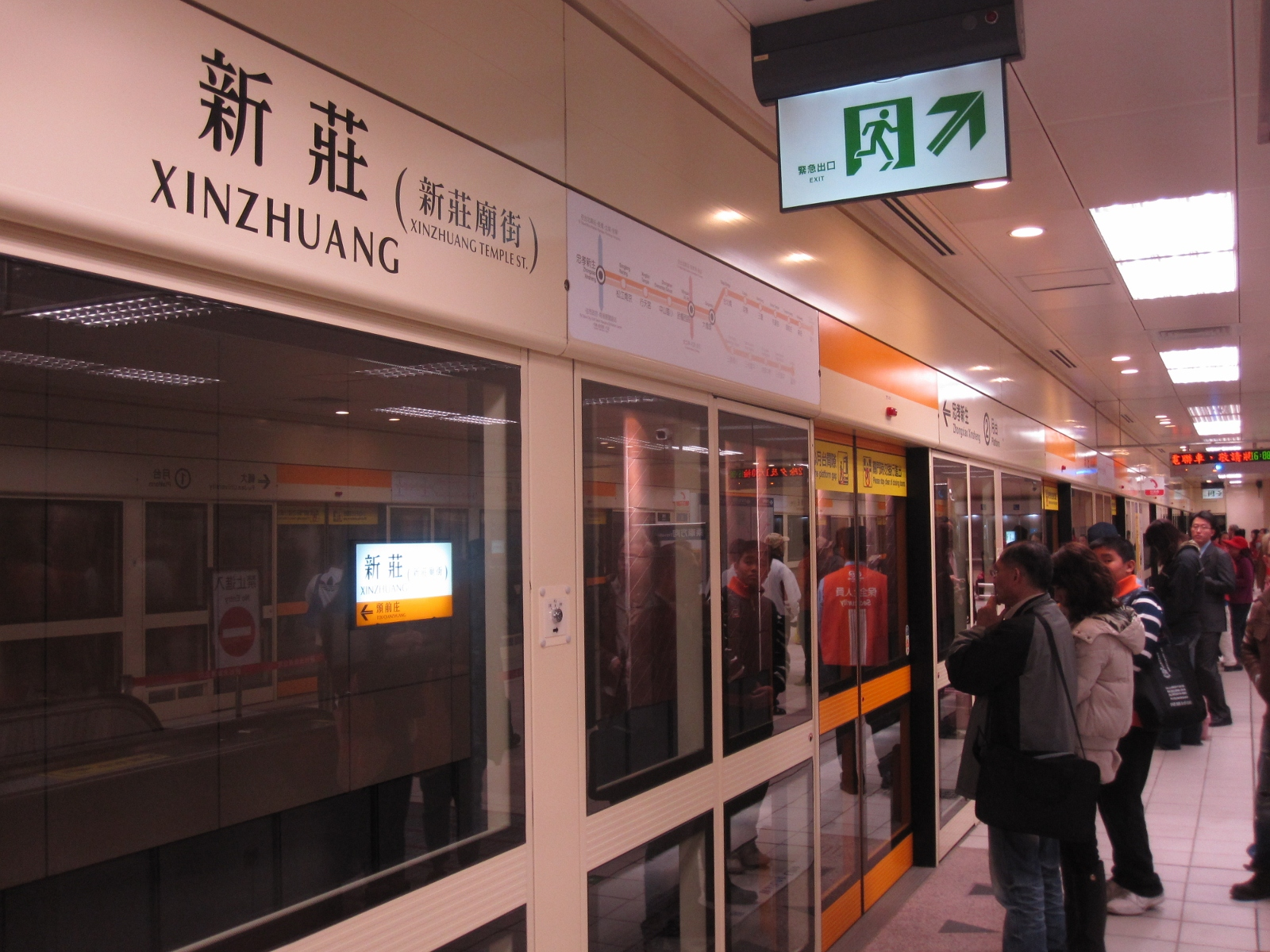
Xinzhuang Station

The Taiwan Railway section between Fuzhou and Shulin passes through Xinzhuang District, but no station is currently planned.

=== Taipei Metro ===
- Danfeng metro station
- Fu Jen University metro station
- Huilong metro station
- Touqianzhuang metro station
- Xinzhuang metro station
- Xingfu metro station
- New Taipei Industrial Park metro station

=== Taoyuan Airport MRT ===
- New Taipei Industrial Park metro station
- Xinzhuang Fuduxin metro station

== Notable natives ==
- Bamboo Chen, actor, acting coach and producer
- Cheng Yu-cheng, member of Legislative Yuan (1981–1987, 1990–1993, 2002–2005)
- Guo Qiusen, former writer
- Hsu Nien Tzu (Nien), rapper, dancer and member of tripleS
- Jolin Tsai, singer-songwriter and actress
- Timi Zhuo, singer and actress

== See also ==
- New Taipei
