= Xingfu metro station =

Metro station in New Tapei, Taiwan

Xingfu 幸福
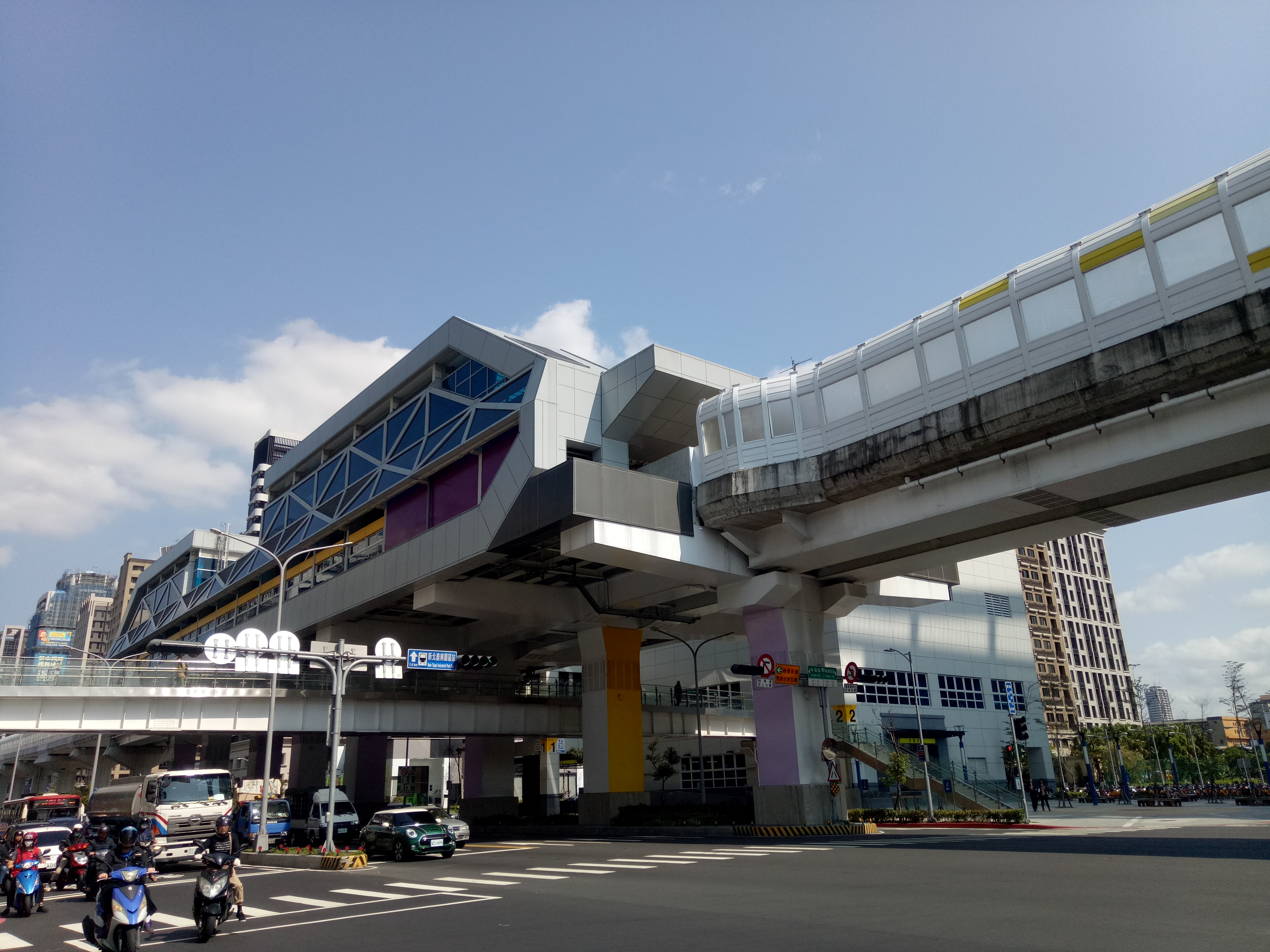
- Xingfu station

Chinese name
- Chinese: 幸福
- Literal meaning: Happiness
Transcriptions
Standard Mandarin
- Hanyu Pinyin: Xìngfú
- Bopomofo: ㄒㄧㄥˋㄈㄨˊ
- Wade–Giles: Hsing⁴-fu²
Hakka
- Pha̍k-fa-sṳ: Hen-fuk
Southern Min
- Tâi-lô: Hīng-hok

General information
- Location: 292 Siyuan Rd; Xinzhuang, New Taipei; Taiwan
- Coordinates: 25.0498581°N 121.4600455°E
- Operated by: New Taipei Metro
- Line: Circular line (Y19)
- Connections: Bus stop

Construction
- Structure type: Elevated

Other information
- Station code: Y19

History
- Opened: 31 January 2020

Services
Preceding station	New Taipei Metro	Following station
Touqianzhuang towards Dapinglin	Circular line	NT Industrial Park Terminus
Location

Xingfu station is a station on the New Taipei Metro's Circular line when it was opened on 31 January 2020. It is located in Xinzhuang District, New Taipei, Taiwan, at the intersection of Siyuan Road and Xingfu East Road.

== Station layout ==
4F	Connecting level	Platforms-connecting overpass
3F	Concourse	Lobby, information desk, automatic ticket machines, shops, one-way faregates Restrooms (outside paid area)
3F	Side platform, doors will open on the right
3F	Platform 1	← Circular line toward New Taipei Industrial Park (Y20 Terminus)
3F	Platform 2	→ Circular line toward Dapinglin (Y18 Touqianzhuang) →
3F	Side platform, doors will open on the right
2F	Connecting level	Stairs, escalators, elevators (overpass to the other side of Siyuan Rd.)
Street level	Ground level	Entrance/exit, shops

== Exits ==
- Exit 1: Intersection of Siyuan Rd. and Ln. 296, Siyuan Rd.
- Exit 2: Intersection of Siyuan Rd. and Xingfu E. Rd.

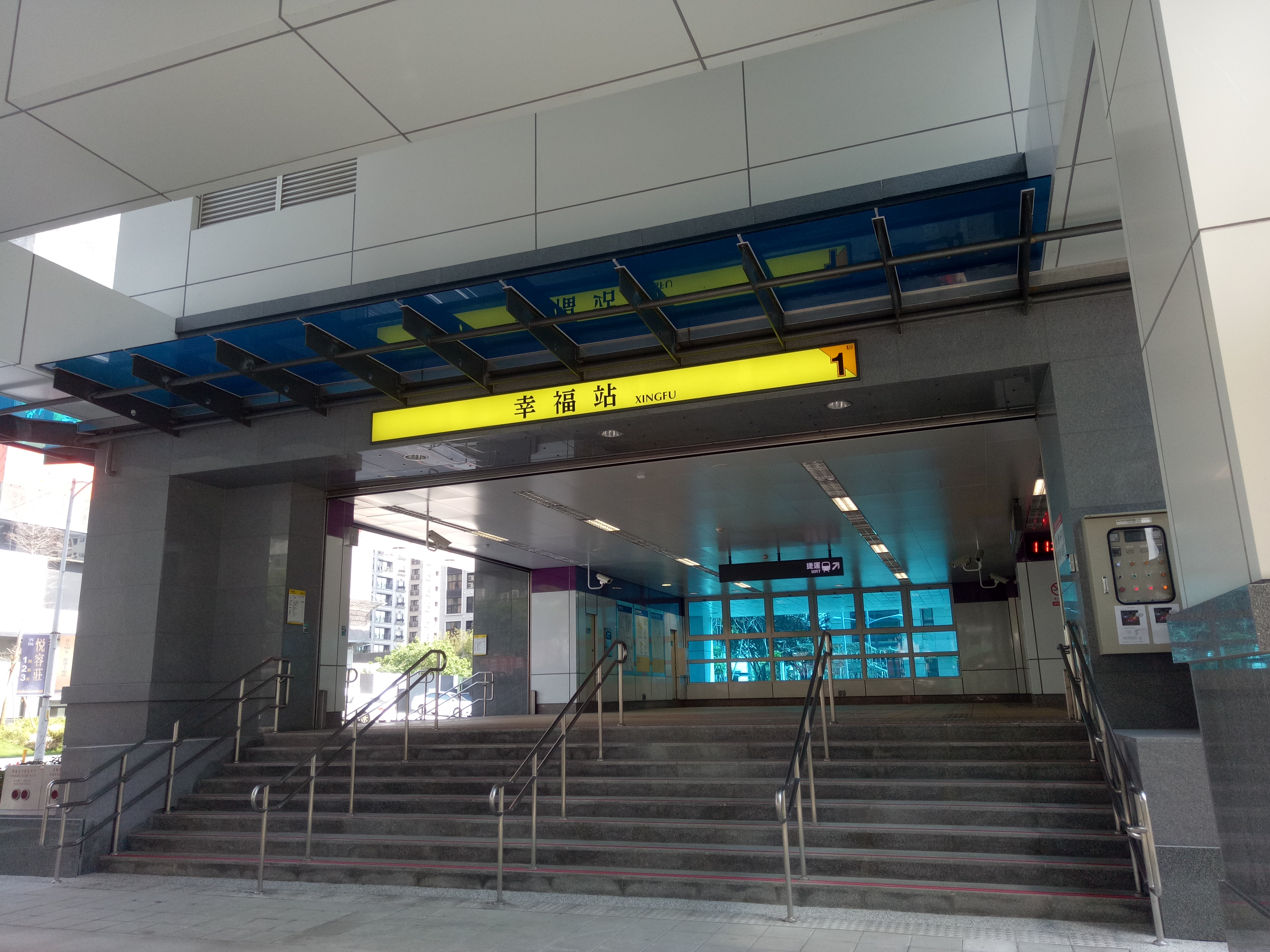
Exit 1

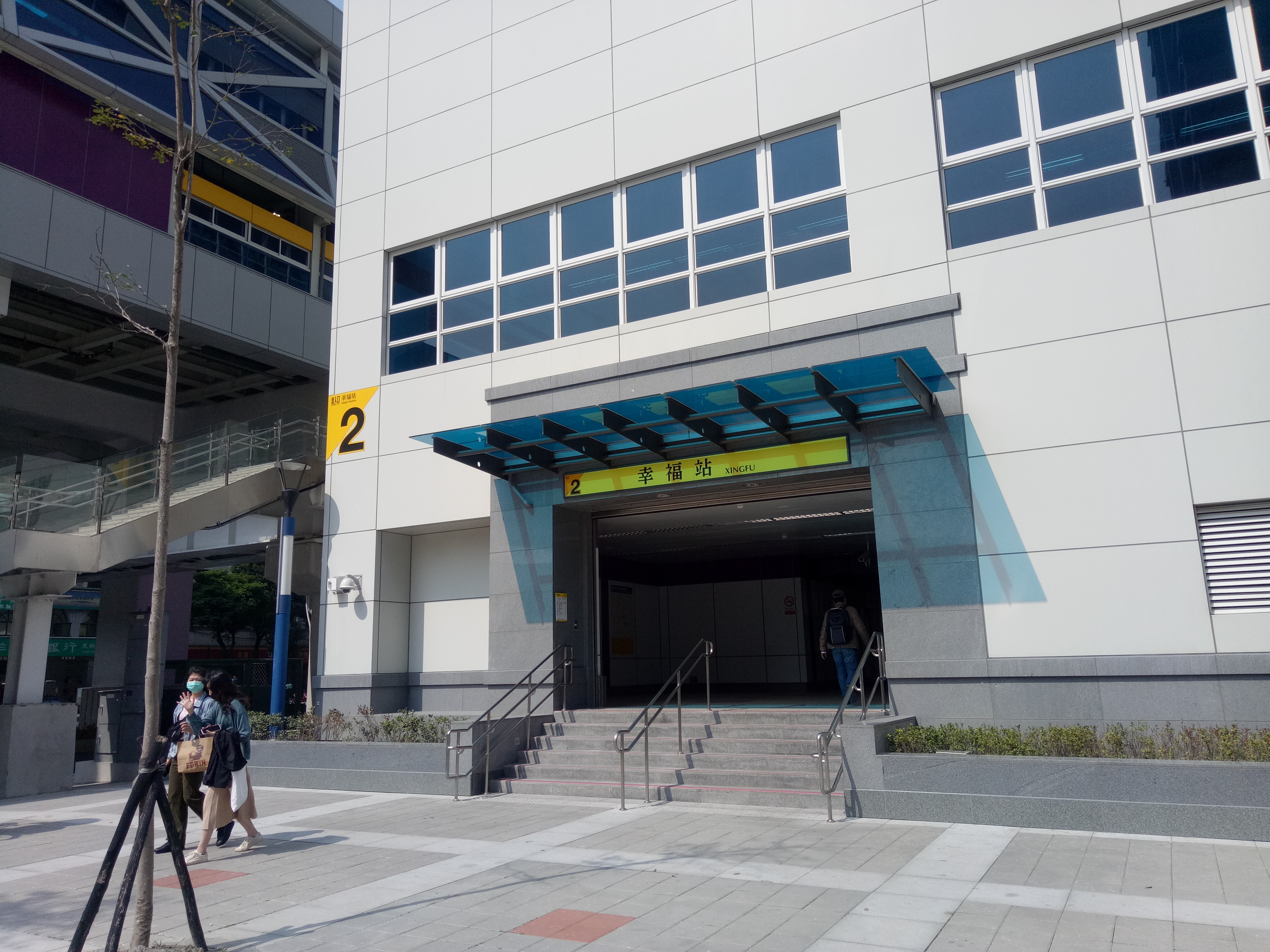
Exit 2

== Around the station ==
- Touqian Sports Park (180m east of Exit 1)
- PX Mart Xinzhuang Xingfu Store (450m west of Exit 2)
- Sukiya Xingfu Store (130m northwest of Exit 2)
- Fu Shou Street Night Market (250m west of Exit 2)
- Fushou Park (450m northwest of Exit 2)
- Sixian Park (500m southwest of Exit 2)
- Huacheng Park (化成公園) (400m southeast of Exit 2)
- 中港大排親水步道 (850m west of Exit 2)
