= Xinzhuang metro station =

Metro station in Xinzhuang, New Taipei, Taiwan

Xinzhuang 新莊
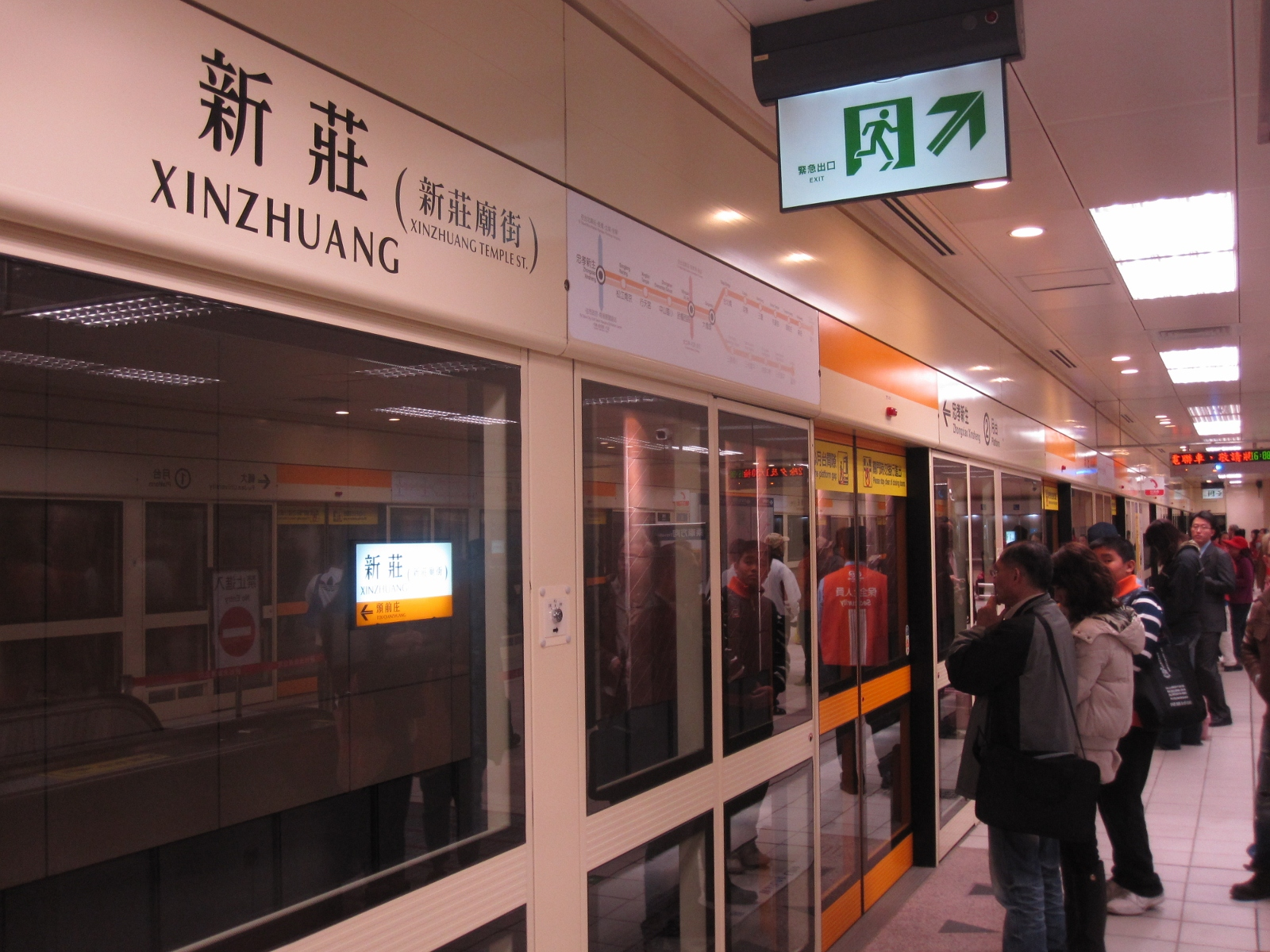
- Xinzhuang station platform 2

Chinese name
- Traditional Chinese: 新莊
- Simplified Chinese: 新庄
- Literal meaning: New Village
Transcriptions
Standard Mandarin
- Hanyu Pinyin: Xīnzhuāng
- Bopomofo: ㄒㄧㄣ ㄓㄨㄤ
- Wade–Giles: Hsin¹-chuang¹
Hakka
- Pha̍k-fa-sṳ: Sîn-chông
Southern Min
- Tâi-lô: Sin-tsng

General information
- Other names: Xinzhuang Temple Street; 新莊廟街(
- Location: B1, No. 138, Zhongzheng Rd. Xinzhuang, New Taipei; Taiwan
- Coordinates: 25.0361°N 121.4523°E
- Operator: Taipei Metro
- Line: Zhonghe–Xinlu line
- Connections: Bus stop

Construction
- Structure type: Underground

Other information
- Station code: O18

History
- Opened: 5 January 2012; 14 years ago

Passengers
- 22,224 daily (December 2024)
- Rank: 72 out of 109

Services
Preceding station	Taipei Metro	Following station
Touqianzhuang towards Nanshijiao	Zhonghe–Xinlu line	Fu Jen University towards Huilong
Location

The Taipei Metro Xinzhuang station is a station on the Zhonghe–Xinlu line located in Xinzhuang District, New Taipei, Taiwan. It opened for service on 5 January 2012.

== Station overview ==
This two-level, underground station has an island platform. It is located beneath the intersection of Zhongzheng Rd. and Zhonghua Rd., in front of Xinzhuang Junior High School. It was scheduled to open in March 2012 along with most of the Xinzhuang Line, but opened earlier for service on 5 January 2012.

=== Construction ===
Excavation depth for this station was 19.2 m (63 ft). It is 223.8 m (734 ft) in length and 16.15 m (53.0 ft) wide. The platform is 141 m (463 ft) long. It has two entrances, two accessibility elevators, and two vent shafts. One of the entrances and vent shafts is integrated into the planned Health Center building.

=== Design ===
The theme for the station is "Flying Silk-Weaving Future".

== Station layout ==
Street level	Entrance/exit	Entrance/exit
B1	Concourse	Lobby, information desk, automatic ticket dispensing machines, one-way faregates
B1	Concourse	Restrooms (inside fare zone, outside fare zone near exit 1)
B2	Platform 1	← Zhonghe–Xinlu line toward Huilong (O19 Fu Jen University)
B2	Island platform, doors will open on the left
B2	Platform 2	→ Zhonghe–Xinlu line toward Nanshijiao (O17 Touqianzhuang) →

=== Exits ===
- Exit 1: Zhongzheng Rd., near Zhonghua Rd.
- Exit 2: Zhongzheng Rd., beside the main gate of Xinzhuang Junior High School

== Around the station ==
- Banqiao 435 Art Zone
- Xinhai Constructed Wetland
- Xinzhuang Baseball Stadium
- Xinzhuang Gymnasium
- Xinzhuang Junior High School
- Xinzhuang District Office
- Xinzhuang Post Office
- New Taipei City Police Department, Xinzhuang Branch
- Xinzhuang St.
- Wusheng Temple
- Xinzhuang Ciyou Temple
- Wenchang Temple
- Xinzhuang Night Market
- Xiaoxiyuan Performance Museum
- Hengyi High School
- Xinzhuang Elementary School
- Guangfu Temple
