= Thailand national under-18 baseball team =

Thailand Baseball U-18

Information
- Country: Thailand
- Confederation: WBSC Asia

WBSC ranking
- Current: 29 (26 October 2026)

The Thailand national under-18 baseball team is the national under-18 team representing Thailand in international baseball competitions. The organization is currently ranked 50th in the world by the World Baseball Softball Confederation. They compete in the bi-annual U-18 Baseball World Cup.

== See also ==
- Thailand national baseball team
- U-18 Baseball World Cup
