= Xinhai Geming =

Xinhai Geming or Xin Hai Ge Ming (Chinese: 辛亥革命) may refer to:

- Xinhai Revolution, a revolution in 1911 that overthrew the Qing Dynasty and established the Republic of China
- 1911 (film), a 2011 Chinese film, its Chinese title reads Xinhai Geming
- 1911 Revolution (TV series), a 2011 Chinese television series
