= Xinhai Constructed Wetland =

Constructed wetland in Banqiao, New Taipei, Taiwan

- 新海人工溼地 (Chinese)
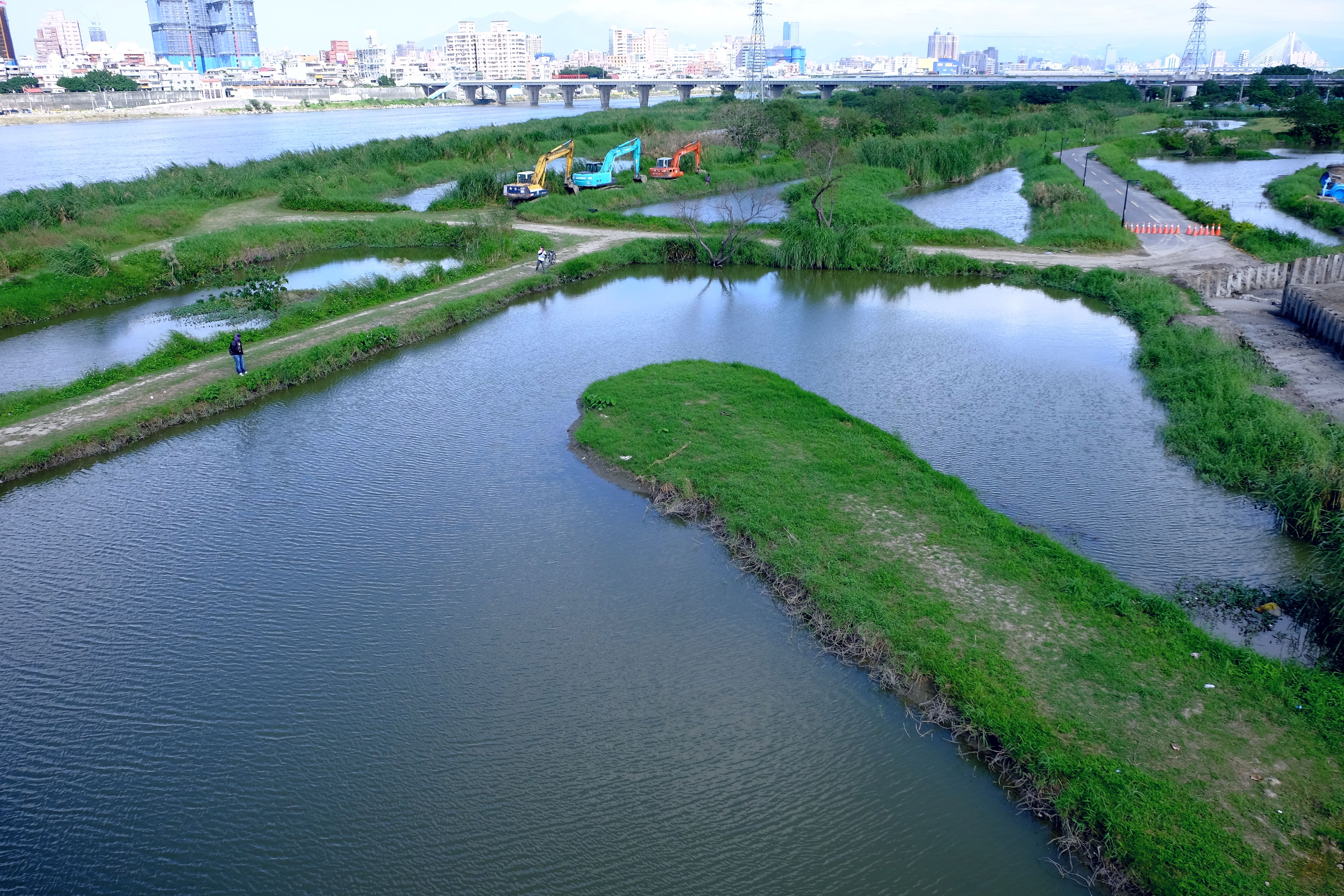

- Location within Taiwan
- Location: Banqiao, New Taipei, Taiwan
- Coordinates: 25°01′45.5″N 121°27′13.4″E
- Type: constructed wetland
- Primary inflows: Dahan River

The Xinhai Constructed Wetland (traditional Chinese: 新海人工溼地; simplified Chinese: 新海人工湿地; pinyin: Xīnhǎi Réngōng Shīdì) is a constructed wetland in Banqiao District, New Taipei, Taiwan.

== History ==
Through the late 20th century, the banks of Dahan Creek turned into garbage dumps due to the growing population and factories within the area which were not served by proper sewage treatment facilities. During heavy rain, the garbage would obstruct the water flow of the creek. In 1992, the Taipei County Government Environmental Protection Bureau launched a project to relocate the old garbage dumps lining the creek. During the Typhoon Herb in July–August 1996, drifting garbage clogged the creek course causing floods. Afterwards in 2003, three sections of Xinhai Constructed Wetland were constructed. The wetland construction was finished in 2009.

== Geology ==
The wetland is located along the Dahan Creek, featuring eight crops, which are paddy rice, wild rice stems, water spinach, foxnut, marsh calla, water caltrop, lotus and crested floatingheart.

== Transportation ==
The wetland is accessible within walking distance south of Xinzhuang Station of Taipei Metro.

== See also ==
- Geography of Taiwan
