= Lin Wen-lang =

Taiwanese politician

Lin Wen-lang MLY
- 林文郎

Member of the Legislative Yuan
- In office 2 May 2006 – 31 January 2008
- Constituency: Republic of China
- In office 19 June 2002 – 31 January 2005
- Preceded by: Chiu Chang
- Constituency: Republic of China
- In office 1 February 1996 – 31 January 2002
- Constituency: Republic of China

Personal details
- Born: 12 March 1945 (age 81)
- Party: Democratic Progressive Party

Lin Wen-lang (Chinese: 林文郎; born 12 March 1945) is a Taiwanese politician.

Lin served four terms on the Taipei City Council and was subsequently elected to the Legislative Yuan twice as via party list proportional representation in 1995 and 1998. Lin took office in 2002 and 2006 as an alternate member of the legislature.

In November 2008, Lin was questioned by the Taichung District Prosecutors' Office about a case of market manipulation.
