= Philippines national under-18 baseball team =

Philippines Baseball U-18

Information
- Country: Philippines
- Confederation: WBSC Asia

WBSC ranking
- Current: 24 (26 March 2026)

The Philippines national under-18 baseball team is the national under-18 team representing the Philippines in international baseball competitions. The organization is currently ranked 36th in the world by the World Baseball Softball Confederation. They compete in the bi-annual U-18 Baseball World Cup.

== See also ==
- Philippines national baseball team
- U-18 Baseball World Cup
