= Xinzhuang Baseball Stadium =

Baseball stadium in Xinzhuang, New Taipei, Taiwan

- 新莊棒球場
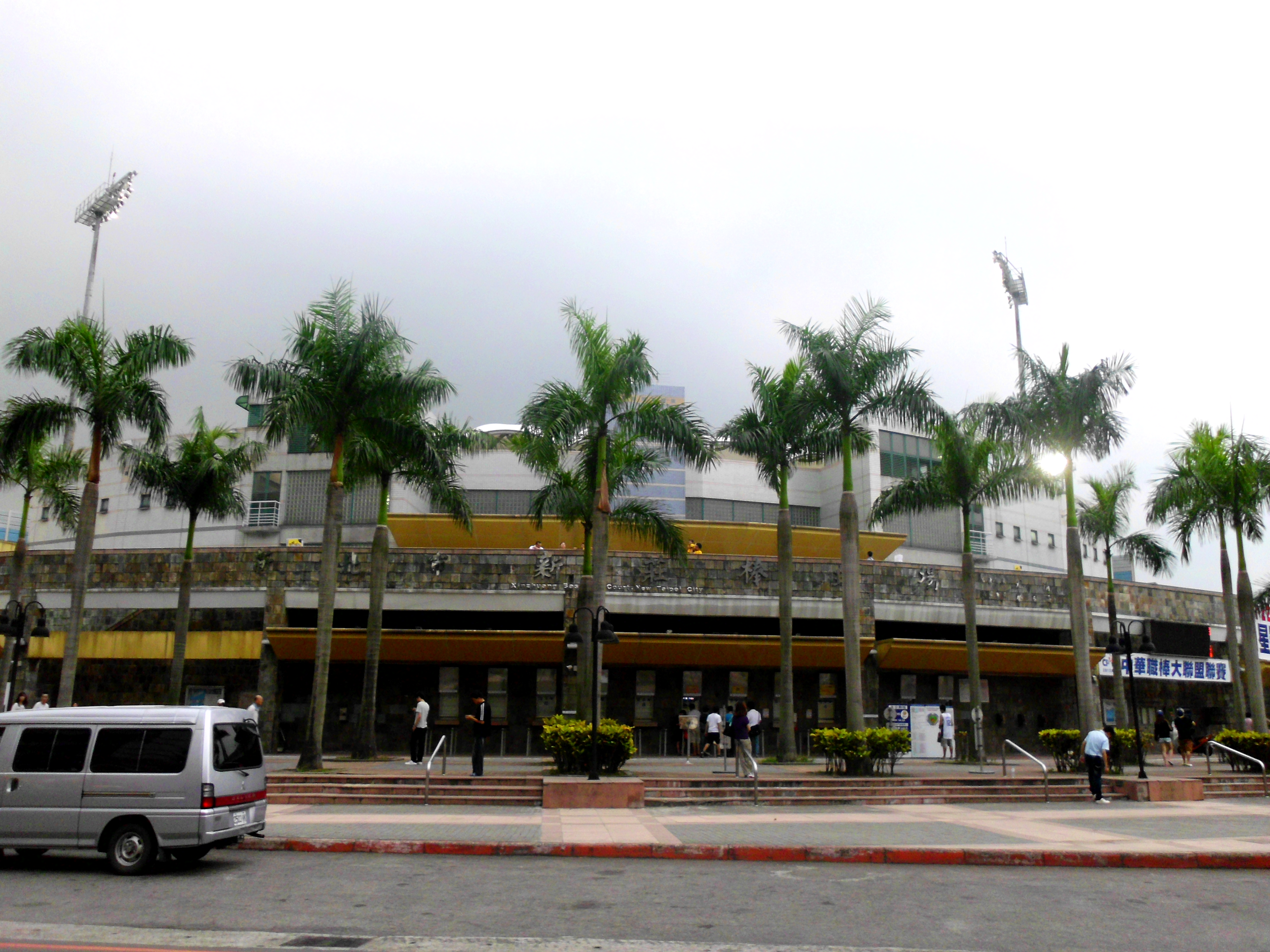
- Interactive map of Xinzhuang Baseball Stadium
- Location: Xinzhuang, New Taipei, Taiwan
- Coordinates: 25.041158°N 121.447718°E
- Capacity: 7,200 (1997); 12,500 (2003)
- Surface: Grass
- Field size: Left Field – 99.1 metres (325 ft); Left-Center – 115.8 metres (380 ft); Center Field – 121.9 metres (400 ft); Right-Center – 115.8 metres (380 ft); Right Field – 99.1 metres (325 ft)
- Public transit: Taipei Metro: Xinzhuang

Construction
- Groundbreaking: 4 July 1996
- Opened: 19 October 1997
- Expanded: 5 October 2003

Tenant
- Fubon Guardians (2017–present)

The Xinzhuang Baseball Stadium (traditional Chinese: 新莊棒球場; simplified Chinese: 新庄棒球场; pinyin: Xīnzhuāng Bàngqiúchǎng) is a baseball stadium in Xinzhuang District, New Taipei City, Taiwan. It is currently mostly used for CPBL baseball games. The stadium can hold 12,500 people and was opened in 1997.

== Ground rules ==
Part of the dugouts are covered by retractable roofs. The roofs must be retracted during games, and any fly ball that hits the retracted roof and bounces back is not considered a foul ball until it lands in foul territory.

== Notable events ==
- 18th National Congress of Kuomintang in October 2009
- 2001 Asian Baseball Championship
- Hosted baseball events of the 2017 Summer Universiade

== Transportation ==
The stadium is accessible within walking distance north west of Xinzhuang Station of Taipei Metro.

== See also ==
- List of stadiums in Taiwan
- Sport in Taiwan
