= New Taipei Industrial Park metro station =

Metro station in New Taipei, Taiwan

New Taipei Industrial Park / A3 新北產業園區
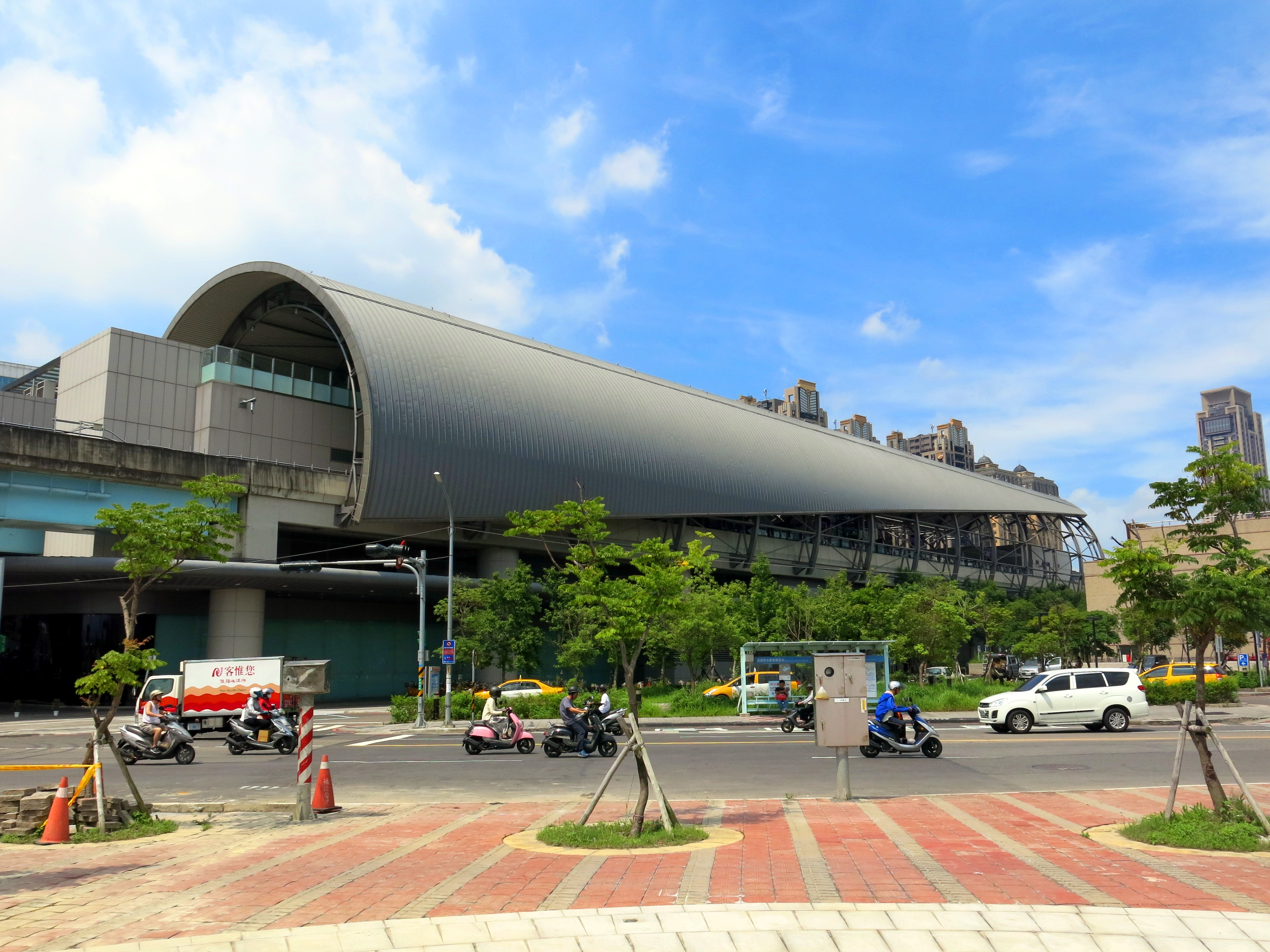

Chinese name
- Traditional Chinese: 新北產業園區
Transcriptions
Standard Mandarin
- Hanyu Pinyin: Xīnběi Chǎnyè Yuánqū
- Bopomofo: ㄒㄧㄣ ㄅㄟˇㄔㄢˇㄧㄝˋㄩㄢˊㄑㄩ
- Wade–Giles: Hsin¹-pei³ Ch'an³-yeh⁴ Yuan²-ch'ü¹
Hakka
- Pha̍k-fa-sṳ: Sîn-pet Sán-ngia̍p-yèn-khî
Southern Min
- Tâi-lô: Sin-pak Sán-gia̍p Hn̂g-khu

General information
- Location: 37 Wugong Rd; Xinzhuang, New Taipei; Taiwan
- Coordinates: 25.0618°N 121.4596°E
- Operator: New Taipei Metro Corporation (Note: The first section of the Circular line was operated by Taipei Rapid Transit Corporation from the opening date to May 22, 2023. On May 23, 2023, the operator for this line was changed to New Taipei Metro Corporation. However, the discussion for Circular line operator will take place again when the construction for South and North sections of this line is completed, in one year.); Taoyuan Metro Corporation
- Lines: Taoyuan Airport MRT; Circular line
- Connections: Bus stop

Construction
- Structure type: Elevated

Other information
- Station code: / A3

History
- Opened: 2017-03-02

Passengers
- Aug 2025: 15,683 (entries and exits, daily, Taoyuan Airport MRT only)
- Rank: 6/22 (Taoyuan Airport MRT)

Services
Preceding station	Taipei Metro	Following station
Xingfu towards Dapinglin	Circular line	Terminus
Preceding station	Taoyuan Metro	Following station
Taipei Main Station Terminus	Taoyuan Airport MRT Express	Chang Gung Memorial Hospital towards Airport Terminal 2 or Huanbei
Sanchong towards Taipei Main Station	Taoyuan Airport MRT Commuter	Xinzhuang Fuduxin towards Laojie River
Future services
Preceding station	Taipei Metro	Following station
Xingfu towards Dapinglin	Circular line Future service	New Taipei Exhibition Hall towards Jiannan Road
Location

New Taipei Industrial Park station (Chinese: 新北產業園區站) is a metro station in Xinzhuang District, New Taipei, Taiwan, served by both the Taoyuan Metro and the Taipei Metro.

The station opened for commercial service on March 2, 2017, with the commencement of operations of the Taoyuan Airport MRT. It is served by both commuter and express trains on that line. Separate platforms opened with the commencement of operations of the first phase of the Taipei Metro Circular line on January 31, 2020.

== Station interviews ==
Both the Taoyuan Metro and Taipei Metro portions of the station are elevated; this is the only station in Taiwan serving two elevated rapid transit lines.

The Taoyuan Airport MRT portion of the station consists of island platforms with four tracks, as it was designed for service by both commuter and express trains. The station is 132 metres (433 ft 1 in) long and 32 metres (105 ft 0 in) wide. It opened for trial service on February 2, 2017, and for commercial service on March 2, 2017. The station began offering in-town check-in and luggage handling services in January 2020.

The Taipei Metro Circular line portion of the station features side platforms. The station is about 87 metres (285 ft 5 in) long, 23 metres (75 ft 6 in) wide, and 33.5 metres (109 ft 11 in) high, and connected to an integrated development building. The theme is "flight".

As the Taipei Metro and the Taoyuan Metro are different systems, transfer passengers exit one system and then enter the other via the respective fare gates. An elevated transfer bridge approximately 40 metres (131 ft 3 in) long connects the two platform areas.

=== History ===
- March 2, 2017: The station opened for commercial service with the opening of the Taipei-Huanbei section of the Airport MRT.
- January 31, 2020: Taipei Metro’s Yellow line began service.

== Station layout ==
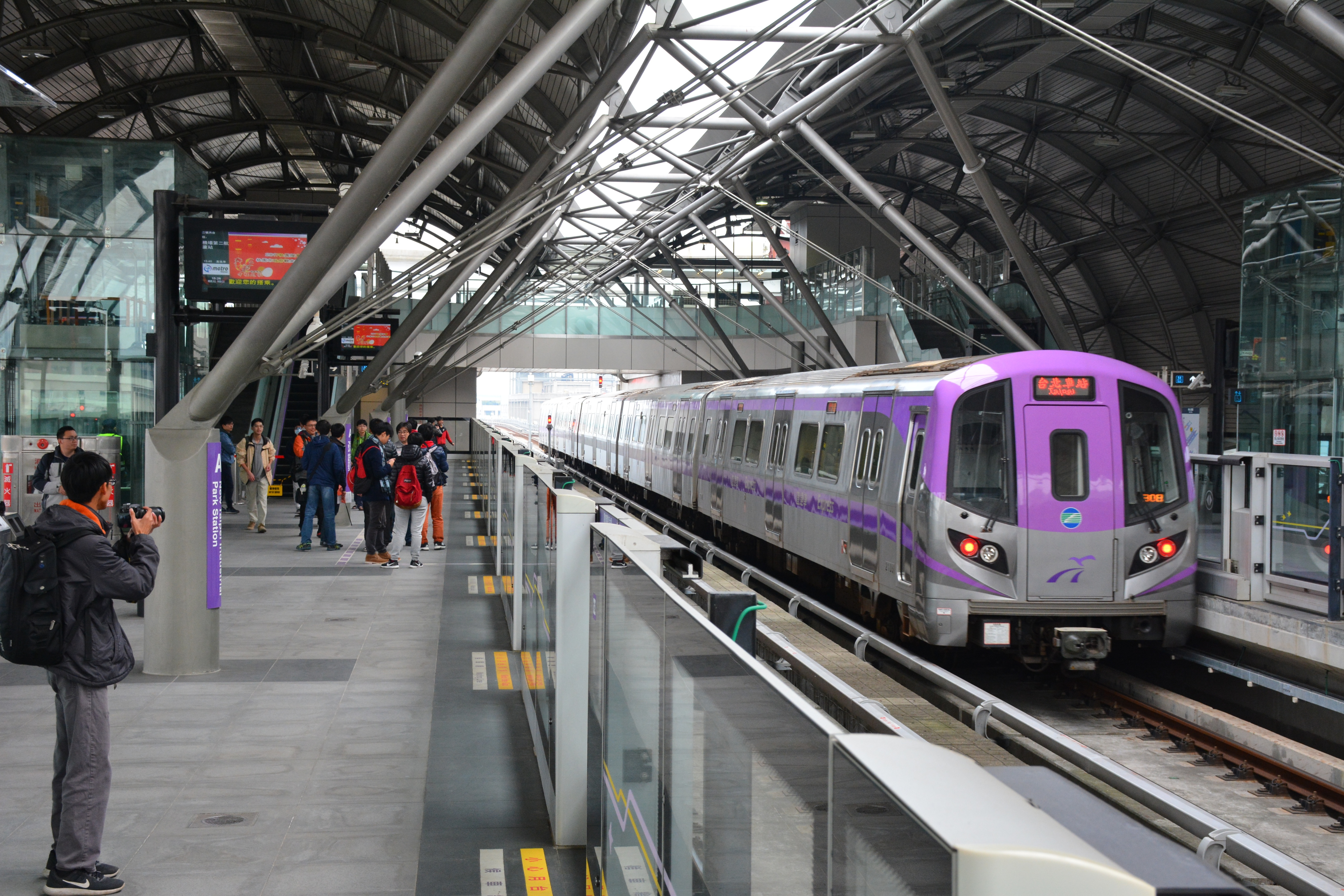
An express train entering New Taipei Industrial Park station

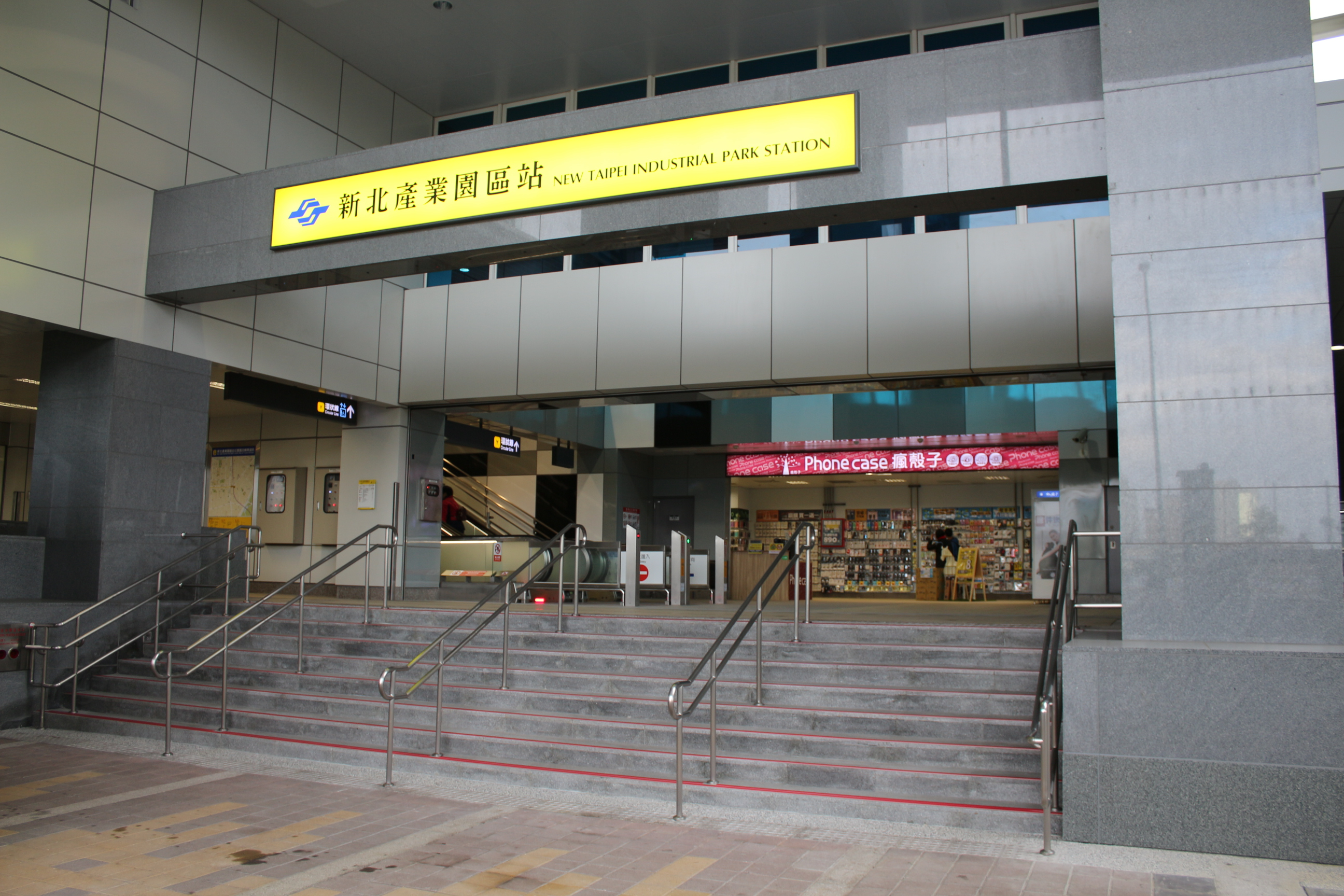
Exit 1, Circular line

6F
6F	Side platform, doors will open on the right
6F	Platform 1	← Circular line toward Jiannan Rd. (Y21 New Taipei Exhibition Hall, under construction)
6F	Platform 2	Circular line toward Dapinglin (Y19 Xingfu)→
6F	Side platform, doors will open on the right
5F	Circular Line Concourse	Circular line information desk, automatic ticket machines, one-way faregates, passageway towards Airport MRT, restrooms (in the outside paid area)
3F	Connecting level	Airport MRT information desk, automatic ticket machines, one-way faregates, Transfer passageway
2F	Platform 1	← Airport MRT Commuter toward Laojie River (Xinzhuang Fuduxin)
2F	Island platform, doors will open on the right/left
2F	Platform 2	← Airport MRT Express toward Airport / Huanbei (Chang Gung Memorial Hospital)
2F	Platform 3	→ Airport MRT Express toward Taipei (Taipei Main Station) →
2F	Island platform, doors will open on the right/left
2F	Platform 4	→ Airport MRT Commuter toward Taipei (Sanchong) →
Street level	Lobby; Connecting level	Entrance/exit, information counter, automatic ticketing machines, faregates Restrooms

=== Exits ===
Airport MRT:

- Exit 1: Northwest side of intersection of Wugong Rd. and Sec. 1, Zhongshan Rd. (New Taipei Blvd.)
- Exit 2: Southeast of connection level on the ground

Circular line:

- Exit 1: Northwest side of intersection of Wugong Rd. and Sec. 1, Zhongshan Rd. (next to Airport MRT entrance)

== Around the station ==
- New Taipei Industrial Park
- New Taipei Changping Elementary School
- New Taipei Touqian Junior High School
- Zhongshan Bridge
- Crown Plaza (300m north of the station)
- Fuji Park (300m southeast of the station)
- Changping Park (400m southwest of the station)
- Fumei Park (600m south of the station)
- Wenzidi Wetland Park (900m southwest of the station)
- Circular Line
