= Chang Gung Memorial Hospital metro station =

Metro station in Taoyuan, Taiwan

Chang Gung Memorial Hospital A8 長庚醫院
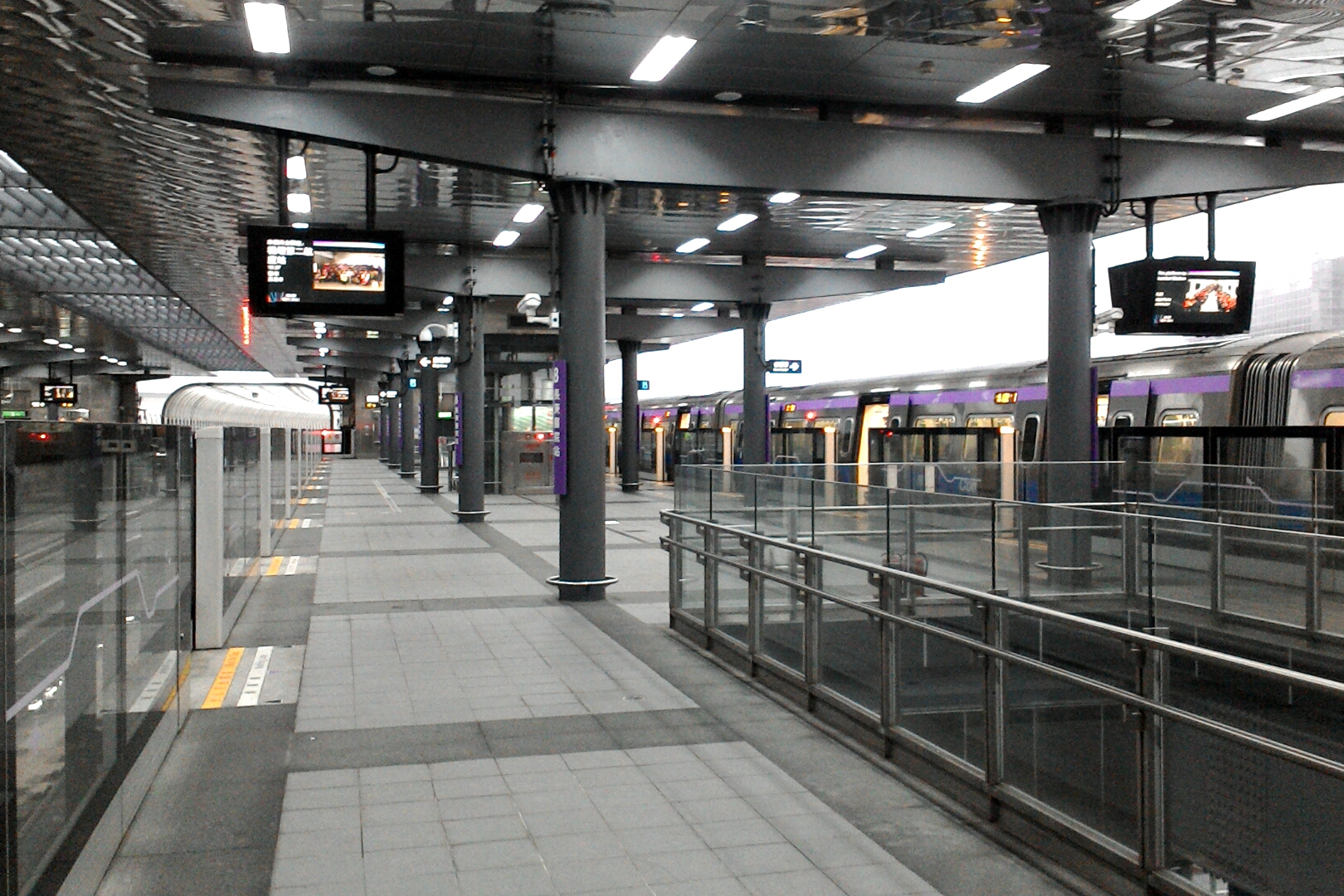
- Station platform

General information
- Location: 6 Wenhua 1st Rd; Guishan, Taoyuan City; Taiwan
- Coordinates: 25°3′37.8″N 121°22′14.7″E
- Operator: Taoyuan Metro Corporation
- Line: Taoyuan Airport MRT (A8)

Construction
- Structure type: Elevated

Other information
- Station code: A8

History
- Opened: 2017-03-02

Passengers
- Aug 2025: 20,709 (entries and exits, daily)
- Rank: 5/22

Services
| Preceding station | Taoyuan Metro | Following station |
|---|---|---|
| New Taipei Industrial Park towards Taipei Main Station | Taoyuan Airport MRT Express | Airport Terminal 1 towards Airport Terminal 2 or Huanbei |
| National Taiwan Sport University towards Taipei Main Station | Taoyuan Airport MRT Commuter | Linkou towards Laojie River |
Location

Chang Gung Memorial Hospital (Chinese: 長庚醫院站; pinyin: Chánggēng Yīyuàn Zhàn) is a station on the Taoyuan Airport MRT located in Guishan District, Taoyuan City, Taiwan. The station is served by both all-stop commuter services and limited-stop express services.

== Station overview ==
This elevated station has two island platforms with four tracks for both commuter and express services. The station is 92.3 metres (303 ft) long and 38.6 metres (127 ft) wide. It opened for trial service on 2 February 2017, and for commercial service on 2 March 2017.

Land adjacent to the station was developed as a joint development project between government and private enterprises. The project includes construction of a shopping district, hotel, and private residences, and encompasses an area of 12,011 square metres (2.968 acres).

=== History ===
- 2017-03-02: The station opened for commercial service with the opening of the Taipei-Huanbei section of the Airport MRT.

== Station layout ==
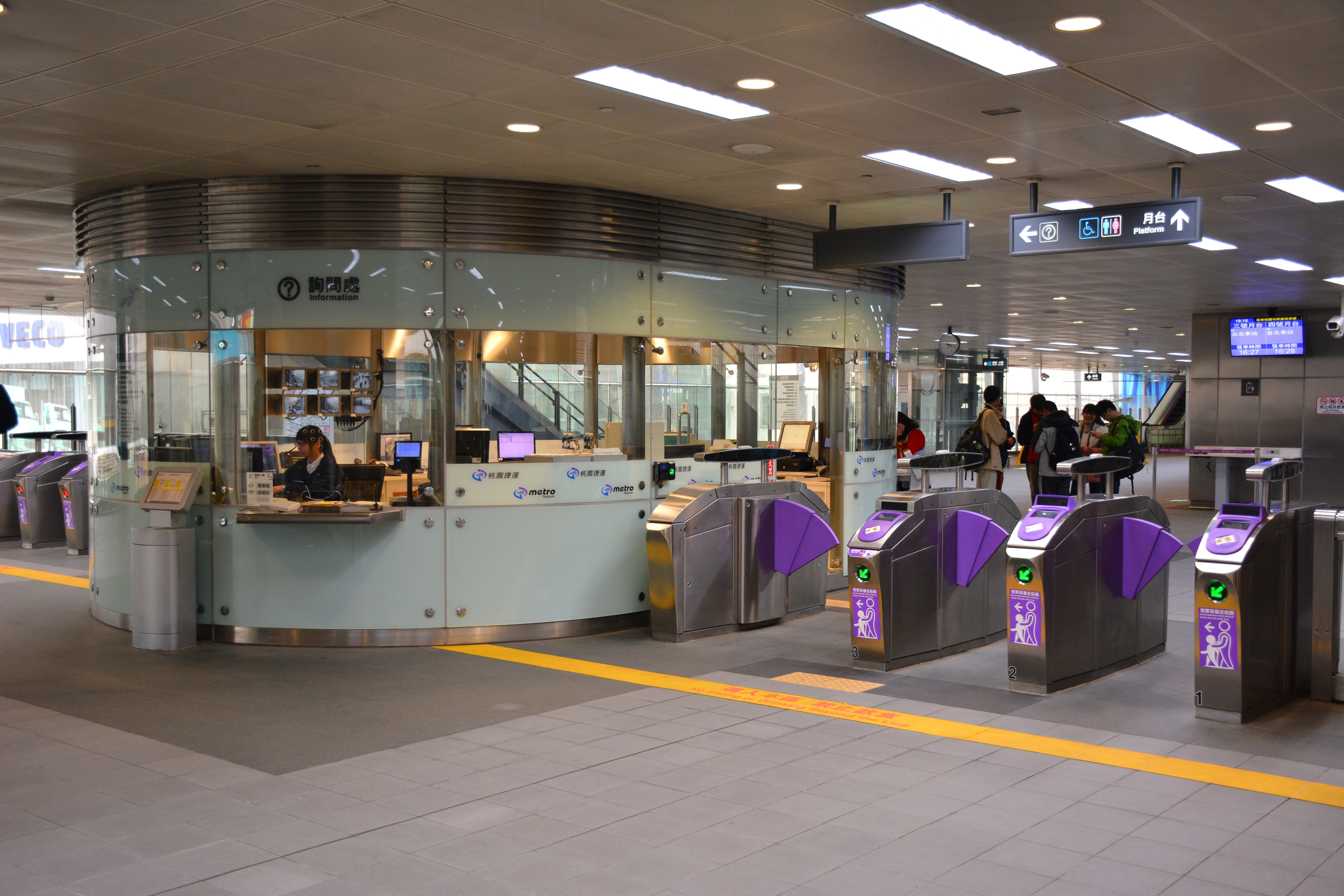
Information counter and faregates

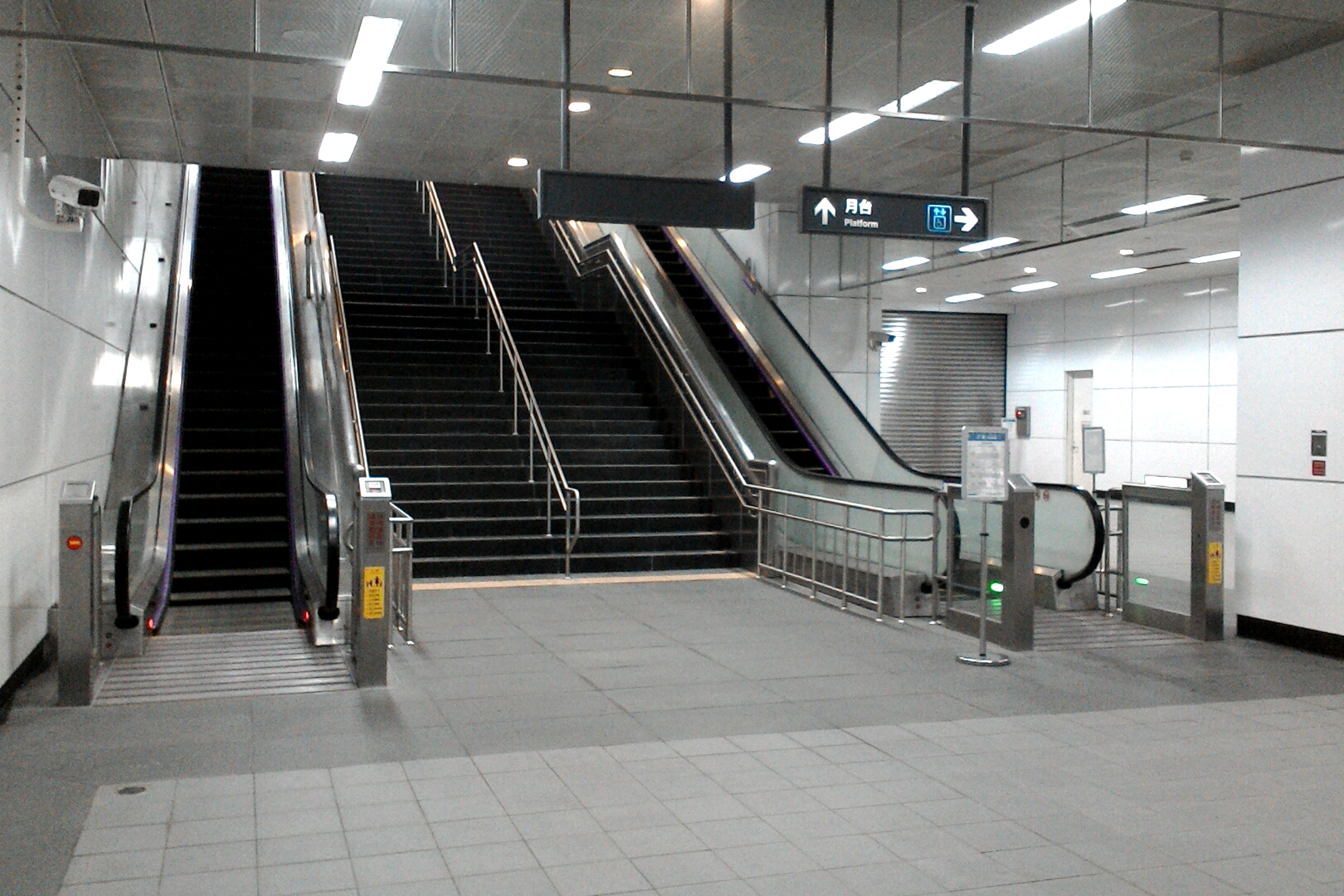
Entry escalators

| 3F | Platform 1 | ← Airport MRT commuter toward Laojie River (Linkou) |
| 3F | Island platform, doors will open on the right/left |
| 3F | Platform 2 | ← Airport MRT express toward Airport / Huanbei (Airport Terminal 1) |
| 3F | Platform 3 | → Airport MRT express toward Taipei (New Taipei Industrial Park) → |
| 3F | Island platform, doors will open on the right/left |
| 3F | Platform 4 | → Airport MRT commuter toward Taipei (National Taiwan Sport University) → |
| 2F | Connecting level | Station lobby, information counter, automatic ticket machines, faregates, restrooms |
| Street level | Lobby | Entrance/exit |

=== Exits ===
- Exit 1: Southeast side of intersection of Wenhua 1st Rd. and Fuxing 1st Rd.

== Around the station ==
- Chang Gung Memorial Hospital
- Wenxin Elementary School
- Da Gang Junior High School

== See also ==
- Taoyuan Metro
