= Wugu–Taishan LRT =

Planned railway system in New Taipei City, Taiwan

Overview
- Native name: 五股泰山輕軌
- Locale: New Taipei City, Taiwan
- Stations: 14
- Color on map: Fuchsia

Service
- Type: Light rail
- Operator: New Taipei Metro

Technical
- Line length: 11.48 km (7.13 mi)

The Wugu–Taishan LRT (Chinese: 五股泰山輕軌; pinyin: Wǔgǔtàishānqīngguǐ) is a planned light rail transit (LRT) system in the Sanchong, Luzhou, Wugu and Taishan Districts, New Taipei City, Taiwan. The route begins from Jixian Environmental Park, passing through Luzhou, Wugu, and Taishan, terminating at the location between Taishan metro station (A5) and Taishan Guihe metro station (A6) on the Taoyuan Airport MRT. A new station (tentative name: Wenzizun, station code: A5a) is also planned to be set up on Taoyuan Airport MRT to allow transfers between the light rail system. Wugu–Taishan LRT is known in the New Taipei Metro system as the Fuchsia line, or line F.

An extension to Banqiao District is also being planned, known as the Taishan–Banqiao light rail.

== See also ==
- Rail transport in Taiwan
- List of railway stations in Taiwan
