= Shanbi =

Shanbi may refer to:

- Shanb-i Ghazani, a Persian place name.
- Shanbi (山鼻里), Luzhu District, Taoyuan, Taiwan
- Shanbi metro station, a station of the Taoyuan Airport MRT
