= Xinzhuang Fuduxin metro station =

Metro station in New Taipei, Taiwan

Xinzhuang Fuduxin A4 新莊副都心
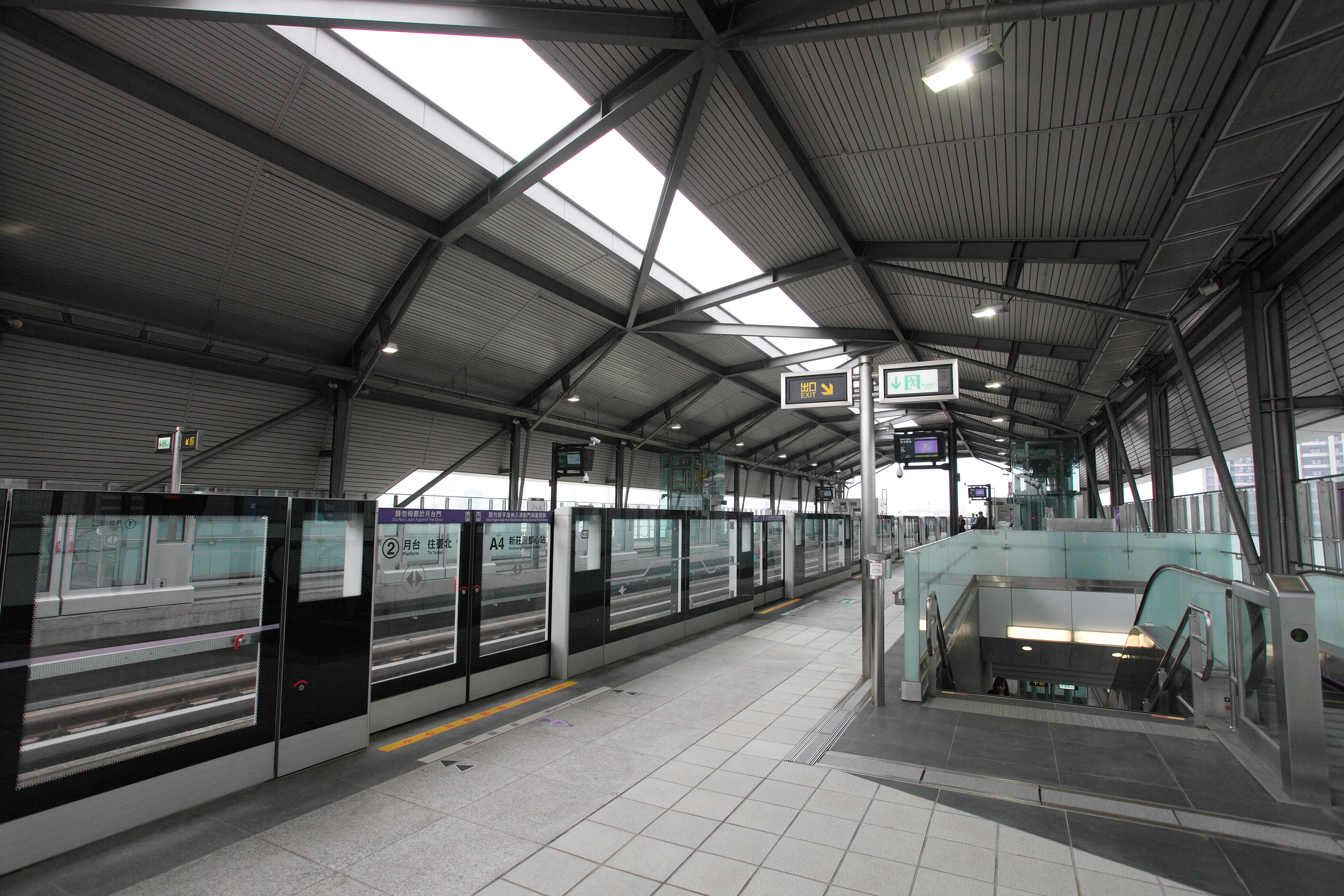
- Station platform

Chinese name
- Traditional Chinese: 新莊副都心
- Literal meaning: Xinzhuang Sub-city Center
Transcriptions
Standard Mandarin
- Hanyu Pinyin: Xīnzhuāng Fùdūxīn
- Bopomofo: ㄒㄧㄣ ㄓㄨㄤ ㄈㄨˋㄉㄨ ㄒㄧㄣ
- Wade–Giles: Hsin¹-chuang¹ Fu⁴-tu¹-hsin¹
Southern Min
- Tâi-lô: Sin-tsng Hù-too-sim

General information
- Location: 188 Sec 4 New Taipei Blvd; Xinzhuang, New Taipei; Taiwan
- Coordinates: 25.0589°N 121.4456°E
- Operated by: Taoyuan Metro Corporation
- Line: Taoyuan Airport MRT (A4)
- Connections: Bus stop

Construction
- Structure type: Elevated

Other information
- Station code: A4

History
- Opened: 2017-03-02

Passengers
- Aug 2025: 6,323 (entries and exits, daily)
- Rank: 12/22

Services
Preceding station	Taoyuan Metro	Following station
New Taipei Industrial Park towards Taipei Main Station	Taoyuan Airport MRT Commuter	Taishan towards Laojie River
Taoyuan Airport MRT does not stop here
Location

Xinzhuang Fuduxin (Chinese: 新莊副都心) is a station on the Taoyuan Airport MRT located on the border of Xinzhuang and Taishan, New Taipei, Taiwan.

== Station overview ==
This elevated station has two side platforms, and is 98 metres (322 ft) long and 26 metres (85 ft) wide. It is only served by Commuter trains; Express trains bypass this station.

=== History ===
It opened for trial service on 2 February 2017, and for commercial service on 2 March 2017 with the opening of the Taipei-Huanbei section of the Airport MRT.

== Station layout ==
4F	Platform level	Public telephone
4F	Side platform, doors will open on the right
4F	Platform 1	← Airport MRT Commuter toward Laojie River (Taishan) ← Airport MRT Express does not stop here
4F	Platform 2	Airport MRT Express does not stop here → Airport MRT Commuter toward Taipei (New Taipei Industrial Park) →
4F	Side platform, doors will open on the right
3F	Concourse level	Escalators, elevators and stairs toward platform level
3F	Concourse level	Restrooms
3F	Concourse level	Station faregates, information center, ticket machines, public telephone
3F	Concourse level	Escalators, elevators and stairs toward passage level
2F	Passage level	Escalators, elevators and stairs toward entrance/exit
1F	Street level	Exit 1
1F	Street level	Exit 2

== Around the station ==
- New Taipei City Exhibition Hall
- Honhui Plaza shopping mall
- Xinzhuang Joint Office Tower
  - Council of Indigenous Peoples
  - Hakka Affairs Council
  - Ministry of Culture
- Xinzhuang Sub-city Center (Xinzhuang Fuduxin)
- Zhongping Junior High School
- Zhongping Elementary School
