= Xinzhuang Culture and Arts Center =

Art and culture center in Xinzhuang, New Taipei, Taiwan

- 新莊文化藝術中心
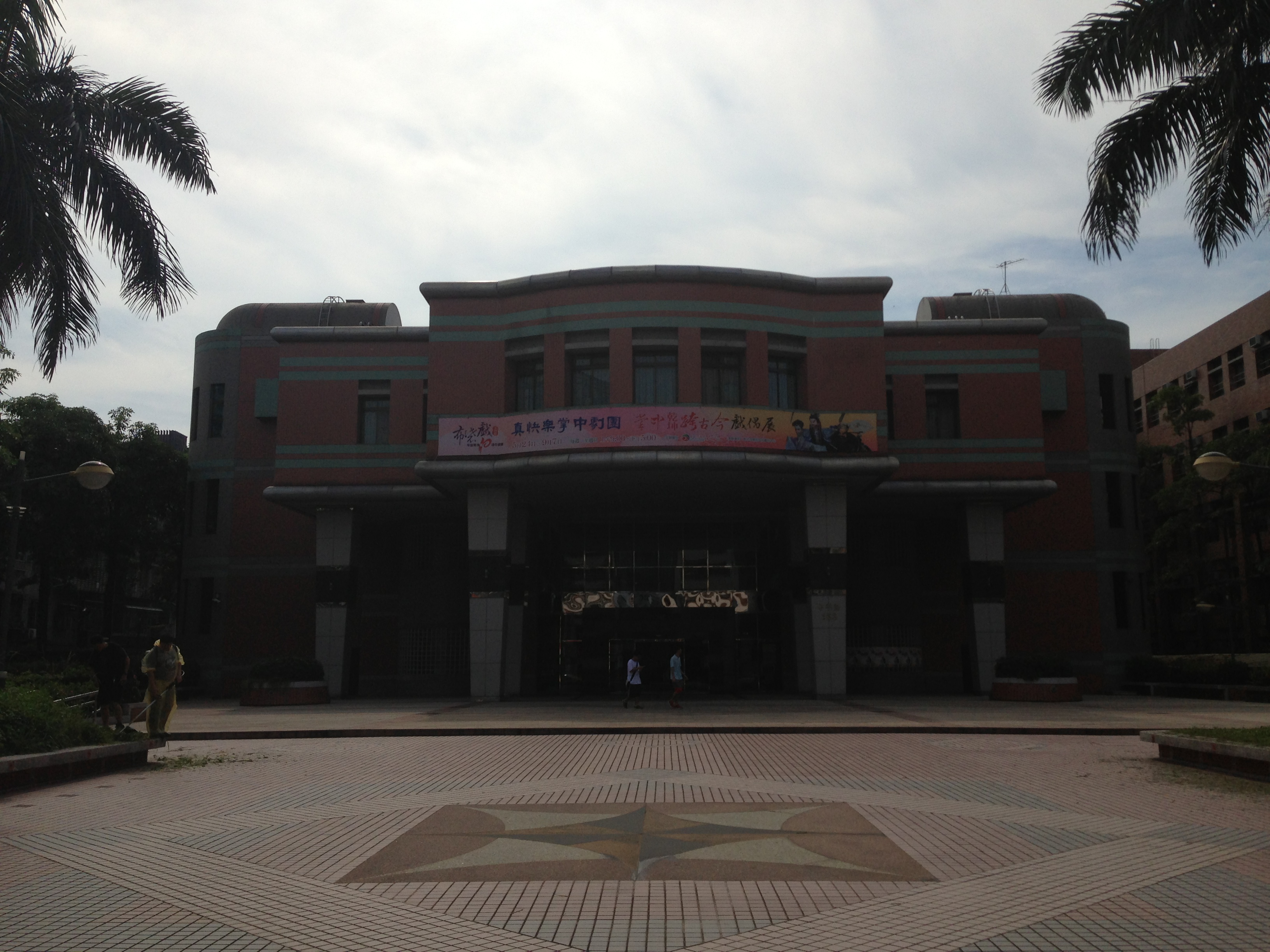
- Interactive map of the Xinzhuang Culture and Arts Center area

General information
- Type: art and cultural center
- Location: Xinzhuang, New Taipei, Taiwan
- Coordinates: 23°18′30.4″N 120°18′57.5″E
- Opened: 11 November 2005
- Cost: NT$300 million

Technical details
- Floor count: 4
- Floor area: 2,791 m^{2}

Website
- en.xzcac.ntpc.gov.tw

The Xinzhuang Culture and Arts Center (traditional Chinese: 新莊文化藝術中心; simplified Chinese: 新庄文化艺术中心; pinyin: Xīnzhuāng Wénhuà Yìshù Zhōngxīn) is an art and cultural center in Xinzhuang District, New Taipei, Taiwan.

== History ==
The preparation for the center started in 1990. In 1991–1992, the center committee observed features from various cultural centers around Taiwan to get the idea of the center features before starting the construction. The construction of the center took 1 year and 10 months and the center was opened on 11 November 2005.

== Architecture ==
Front side of the center features an open space for public. The building has 3 floors and 1 underground floor. The center is divided into the art hall, performing hall, periodical room, reading room and Xinzhuang hand puppet hall The center is equipped with information center and gift shop.

== Transportation ==
The center is accessible within walking distance southeast of Taishan Station of Taoyuan Airport MRT.

== See also ==
- List of tourist attractions in Taiwan
