= Linkou metro station =

Metro station in New Taipei, Taiwan

Linkou A9 林口
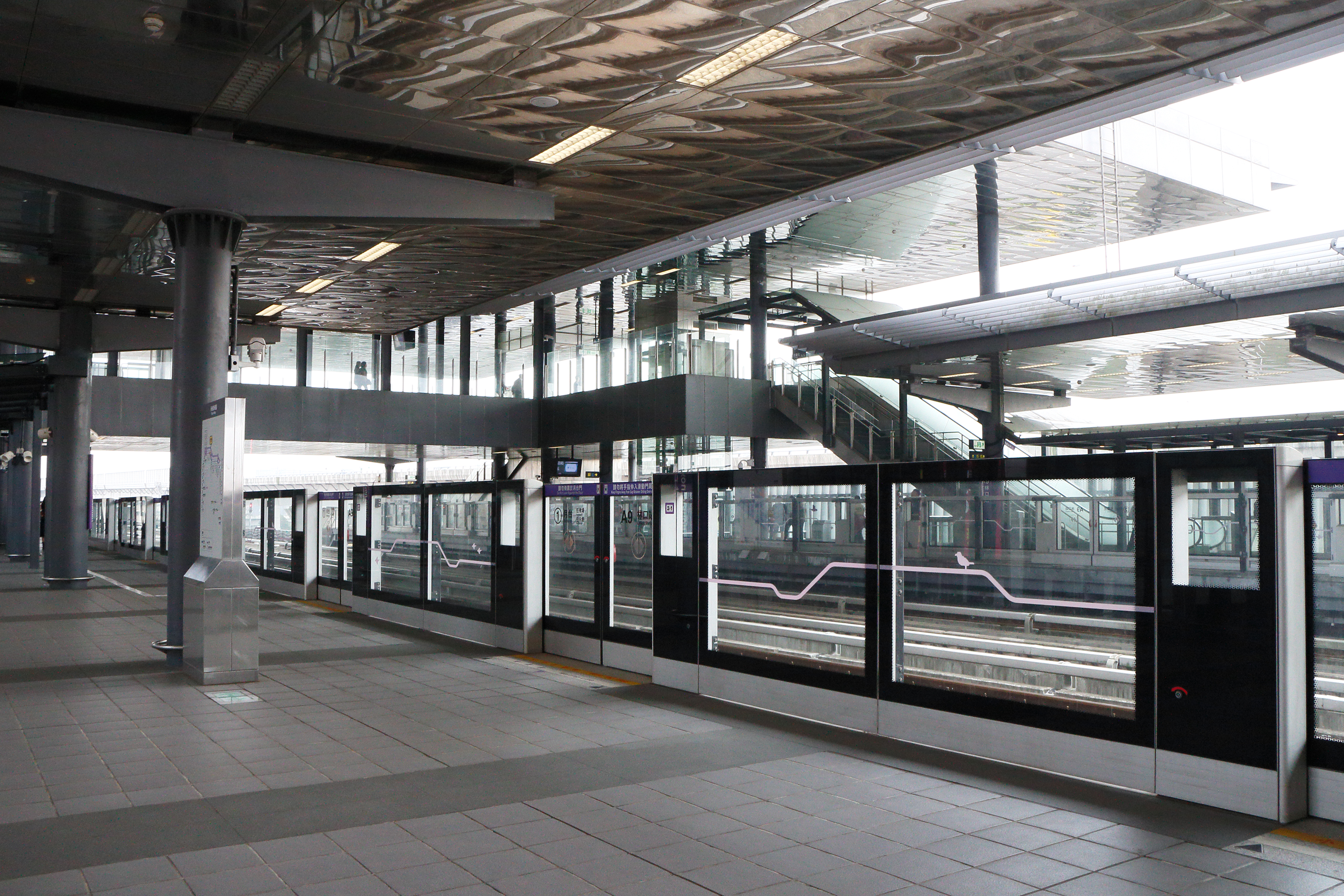
- Station platform

General information
- Location: 290 Bade Rd; Linkou, New Taipei; Taiwan
- Coordinates: 25°3′56.8″N 121°21′40.8″E
- Operated by: Taoyuan Metro Corporation
- Line: Taoyuan Airport MRT (A9)
- Platforms: Side

Construction
- Structure type: Elevated

Other information
- Station code: A9

History
- Opened: 2017-03-02

Passengers
- Aug 2025: 13,254 (entries and exits, daily)
- Rank: 7/22

Services
Preceding station	Taoyuan Metro	Following station
Chang Gung Memorial Hospital towards Taipei Main Station	Taoyuan Airport MRT Commuter	Shanbi towards Laojie River
Taoyuan Airport MRT does not stop here
Location

Linkou (Chinese: 林口站; pinyin: Línkǒu Zhàn) is a station on the Taoyuan International Airport MRT located in Linkou District, New Taipei, Taiwan. The station opened for commercial service on 2 March 2017.

== Station overview ==
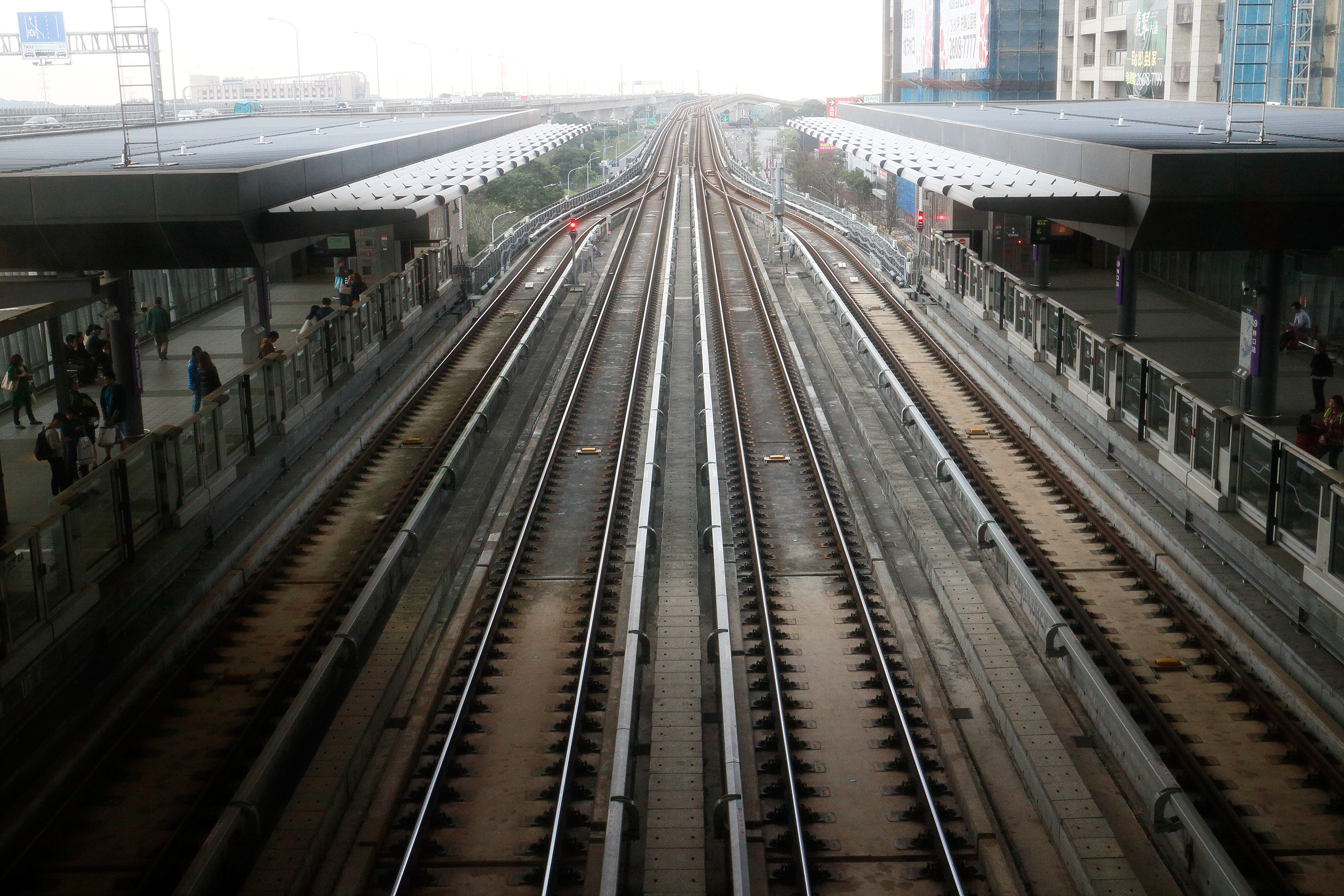
Through tracks for Express train bypass

This elevated station has two side platforms and four tracks, with the two middle tracks used for limited-stop Express services to pass through without stopping, making it the only station thought entire Airport MRT line with this type of track layout. The station is 90.4 metres (297 ft) long and 32.8 metres (108 ft) wide. It opened for trial service on 2 February 2017, and for commercial service 2 March 2017.

The station is located on the New Taipei side of the Linkou Plateau, near the border with Taoyuan. Both adjacent stations are in Taoyuan. Land nearby the station was developed as a joint development project between government and private enterprises. The project consists of a 16-story incorporating residential, commercial, hotel, and public transportation functions, and covers an area of 4,914 square metres (1.214 acres).

=== History ===
- 2017-03-02: The station opened for commercial service with the opening of the Taipei-Huanbei section of the Airport MRT.

== Station layout ==
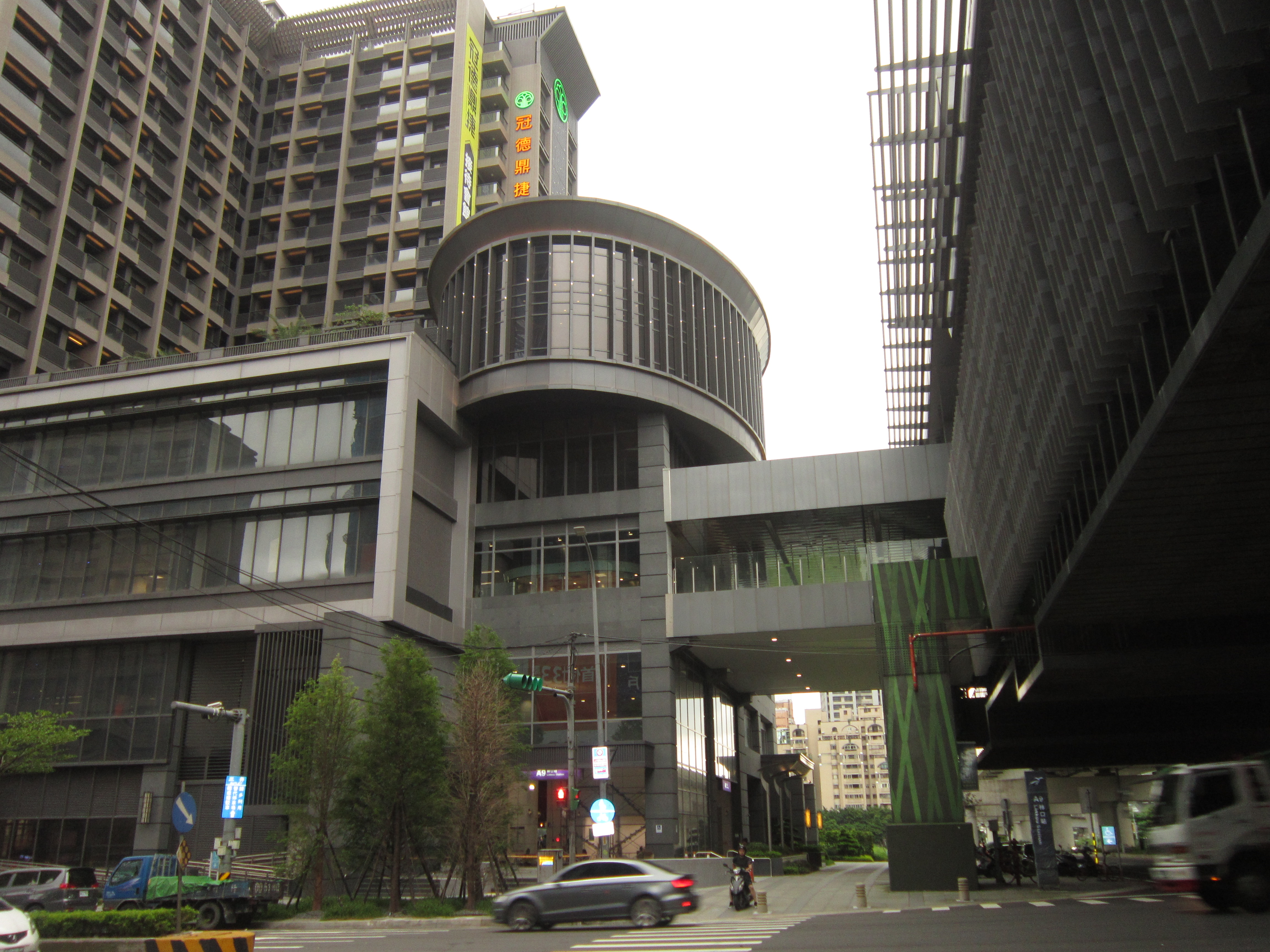
Skybridge to the adjacent joint development building

4F	Connecting Level	Bridge above platform
3F	Station lobby	Station lobby, information counter, automatic ticketing machines, faregates
3F	Side platform, doors will open on the right
3F	Platform 1	← Airport MRT toward Laojie River (Shanbi)
3F	Passing track	← Express Train through service
3F	Passing track	Express Train through service →
3F	Platform 2	→ Airport MRT toward Taipei (Chang Gung Memorial Hospital) →
3F	Side platform, doors will open on the right

2F	Connecting Level	Faregates, waiting area, nursing room

Street Level	Lobby	Entrance/Exit, information counter automatic ticketing machines, faregates, restrooms Tourism information counter, parking, bus stops, taxi stand

=== Exits ===
- Exit 1: Northwest side of intersection of Wenhua 3rd Rd and Bade Rd.

== Around the station ==
- Mitsui Outlet Park Linkou
- Carrefour (Linkou Branch)
- Hsing Wu University
- National Taiwan Normal University - Linkou Campus
- New Taipei Municipal Lin-kou High School
- Hsing Wu High School
- Linkou Zhulinshan Temple (林口竹林山寺)
- Global Mall Linkou A9

== See also ==
- Taoyuan Metro
