= National Taiwan Sport University metro station =

Subway station in Guishan District, Taoyuan City, Taiwan

National Taiwan Sport University (Guishan Leshan) A7 體育大學（龜山樂善）
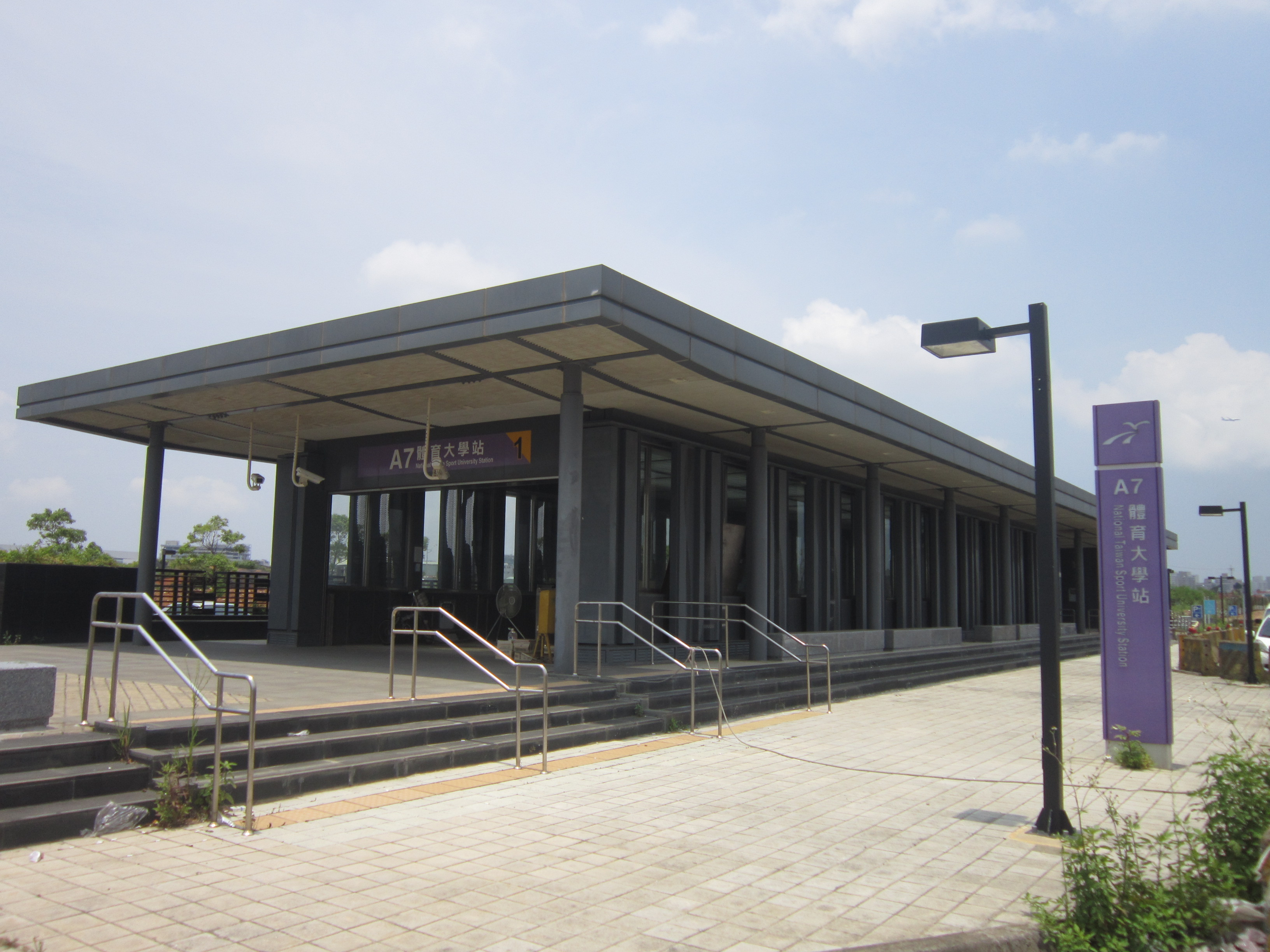

General information
- Location: 688 Wenhua 1st Rd, Guishan, Taoyuan City, Taiwan
- Coordinates: 25°2′28″N 121°23′7″E
- Operator: Taoyuan Metro Corporation
- Line: Taoyuan Airport MRT (A7)

Construction
- Structure type: Underground

Other information
- Station code: A7

History
- Opened: 2 March 2017

Passengers
- Aug 2025: 12,807 (entries and exits, daily)
- Rank: 8/22

Services
Preceding station	Taoyuan Metro	Following station
Taishan Guihe towards Taipei Main Station	Taoyuan Airport MRT Commuter	Chang Gung Memorial Hospital towards Laojie River
Taoyuan Airport MRT does not stop here
Location

National Taiwan Sport University (Chinese: 體育大學; pinyin: Tǐyù Dàxué), sub-station name Guishan Leshan (Chinese: 龜山樂善; pinyin: Guīshān Lèshàn), is a metro station on the Taoyuan Airport MRT located in Guishan District, Taoyuan City, Taiwan. The station opened for commercial service on 2 March 2017. The local place name is Niujiaopo.

== Station overview ==
This underground station has two side platforms. The station is 161.9 metres (531 ft) long and 20.9 metres (69 ft) wide. It opened for trial service on 2 February 2017, and for commercial service on 2 March 2017.

=== History ===
- 2 March 2017: The station opened for commercial service with the opening of the Taipei-Huanbei section of the Airport MRT.

== Around the station ==
- Chang Gung University
- Chang Gung University of Science and Technology
- Formosa Plastics Group Museum
- National Taiwan Sport University

== See also ==
- Taoyuan Metro
