= Taishan Guihe metro station =

Metro station in New Taipei, Taiwan

Taishan Guihe A6 泰山貴和
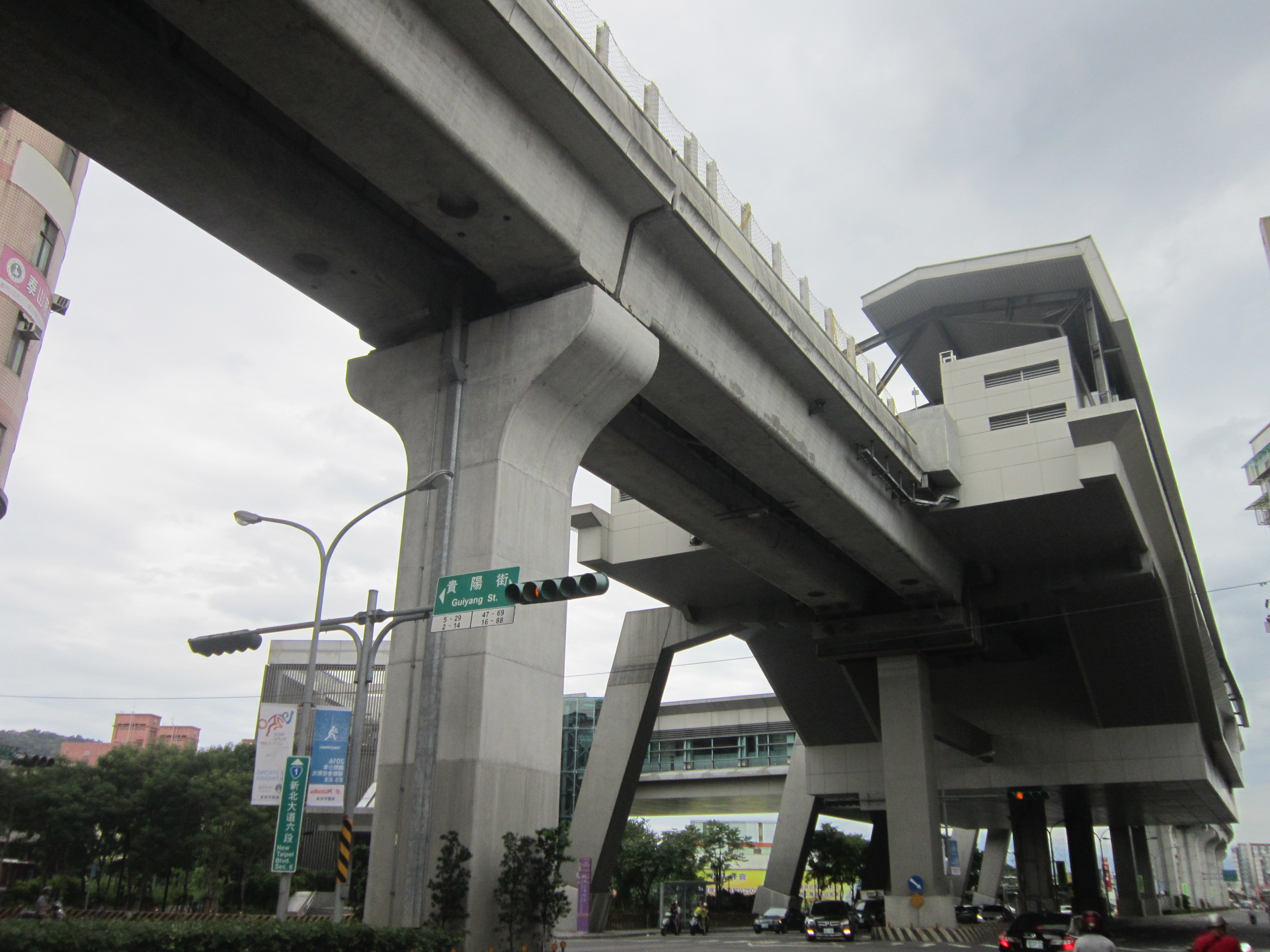

General information
- Location: 460 Sec 6 New Taipei Blvd; Taishan, New Taipei; Taiwan
- Coordinates: 25°1′59.4″N 121°25′21.6″E
- Operator: Taoyuan Metro Corporation
- Line: Taoyuan Airport MRT (A6)

Construction
- Structure type: Elevated

Other information
- Station code: A6

History
- Opened: 2017-03-02

Passengers
- Aug 2025: 5,463 (entries and exits, daily)
- Rank: 13/22

Services
Preceding station	Taoyuan Metro	Following station
Taishan towards Taipei Main Station	Taoyuan Airport MRT Commuter	National Taiwan Sport University towards Laojie River
Taoyuan Airport MRT does not stop here
Location

Taishan Guihe (Chinese: 泰山貴和站; pinyin: Tàishān Guìhé Zhàn) is a station on the Taoyuan Airport MRT located in Taishan District, New Taipei, Taiwan.

== Station overview ==
This elevated station has two side platforms. The station is 86 metres (282 ft) long and 22 metres (72 ft) wide. It opened for trial service on 2 February 2017, and for commercial service 2 March 2017.

The name of the station is derived from its location: Taishan District, Guihe Village.

=== History ===
- 2017-03-02: The station opened for commercial service with the opening of the Taipei-Huanbei section of the Airport MRT.

== Around the station ==
- Ming Chi University of Technology
