= Taishan metro station =

Metro station in New Taipei, Taiwan

Taishan A5 泰山
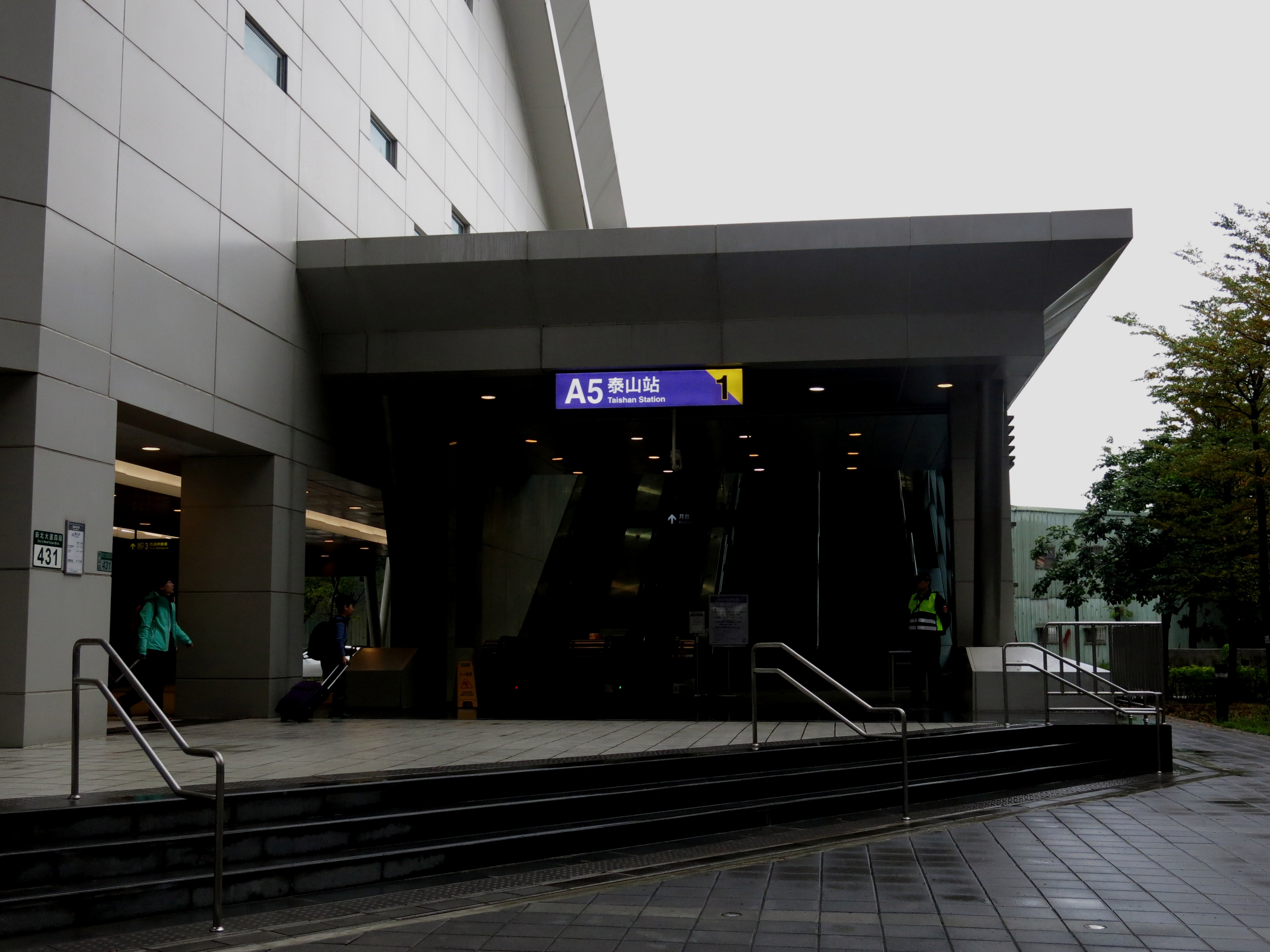

General information
- Location: 431 Sec 4 New Taipei Blvd; Taishan, New Taipei; Taiwan
- Coordinates: 25°3′11.4″N 121°26′21.9″E
- Operated by: Taoyuan Metro Corporation
- Line: Taoyuan Airport MRT (A5)

Construction
- Structure type: Elevated

Other information
- Station code: A5

History
- Opened: 2017-03-02

Passengers
- Aug 2025: 4,532 (entries and exits, daily)
- Rank: 17/22

Services
Preceding station	Taoyuan Metro	Following station
Xinzhuang Fuduxin towards Taipei Main Station	Taoyuan Airport MRT Commuter	Taishan Guihe towards Laojie River
Taoyuan Airport MRT does not stop here
Location

Taishan (Chinese: 泰山; pinyin: Tàishān) is a station on the Taoyuan Airport MRT located on the border of Taishan and Xinzhuang, New Taipei, Taiwan. The station opened for commercial service on 2 March 2017.

== Station overview ==
This elevated station has two side platforms. The station is 84 metres (276 ft) long and 24 metres (79 ft) wide. It opened for trial service on 2 February 2017, and for commercial service 2 March 2017.

=== History ===
- 2 March 2017: The station opened for commercial service with the opening of the Taipei-Huanbei section of the Airport MRT.

== Around the station ==
- Xinzhuang Culture and Arts Center
- Zhongping Junior High School
- Xinzhuang High School
- New Taipei City Xin Wu Tai Civil Sports Center
