= Airport Terminal 2 metro station (Taiwan) =

Metro station in Taoyuan, Taiwan

Airport Terminal 2 A13 機場第二航廈
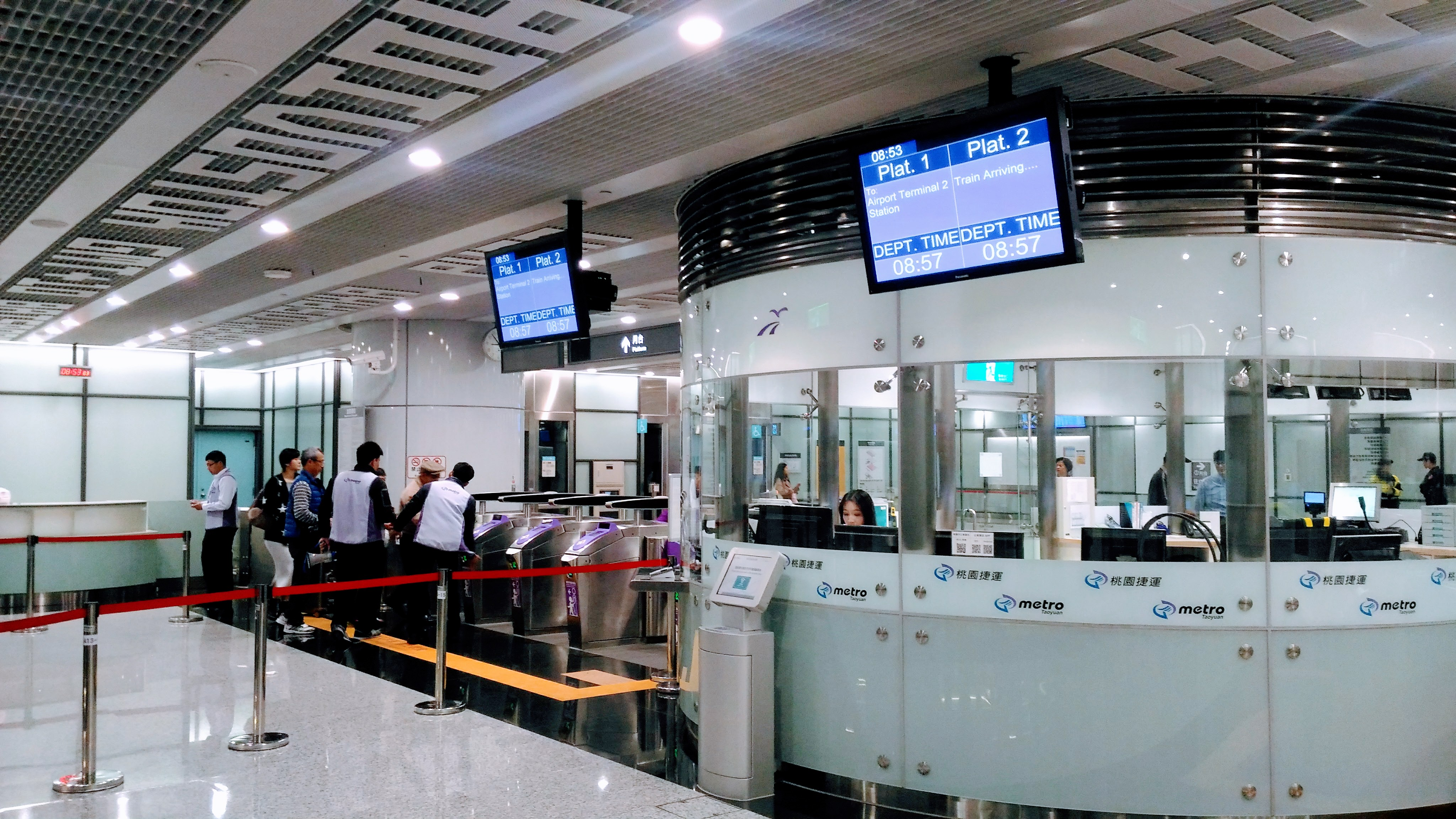
- Information counter and faregates

General information
- Location: Rm 1 B1F 9 Hangzhan S Rd; Dayuan, Taoyuan City; Taiwan
- Coordinates: 25°04′36″N 121°13′53″E
- Operated by: Taoyuan Metro Corporation
- Line: Taoyuan Airport MRT (A13)

Construction
- Structure type: Underground

Other information
- Station code: A13

History
- Opened: 2017-03-02

Passengers
- Aug 2025: 22,731 (entries and exits, daily)
- Rank: 4/22

Services
Preceding station	Taoyuan Metro	Following station
Airport Terminal 1 towards Taipei Main Station	Taoyuan Airport MRT Express	Terminus
Airport Terminal 1 towards Taipei Main Station	Taoyuan Airport MRT Express	Taoyuan HSR station towards Huanbei
Airport Terminal 1 towards Taipei Main Station	Taoyuan Airport MRT Commuter	Airport Hotel towards Laojie River
Location

Airport Terminal 2 (Chinese: 機場第二航廈站) is a station on the Taoyuan Airport MRT located in Dayuan, Taoyuan City, Taiwan. The station is located directly under Terminal 2 of Taoyuan International Airport and opened for commercial service on 2 March 2017.

This underground station has two side platforms and two tracks. Both the limited-stop Express services and all-stop Commuter services call at this station, with the station serving as the western terminus for regularly scheduled limited-stop Express services. The station is 228.0 metres (748.0 ft) long and 16.3 metres (53 ft) wide. It opened for trial service on 2 February 2017, and for commercial service 2 March 2017.

Station construction was overseen by the Bureau of High Speed Rail (under the Ministry of Transportation and Communications). Space was reserved during construction of Taoyuan International Airport Terminal 2 for a medium-capacity rubber-tired system.

== History ==
- 2017-03-02: The station opened for commercial service with the opening of the Taipei-Huanbei section of the Airport MRT.

== See also ==
- Taoyuan Metro
