= New Taipei City Exhibition Hall =

Convention center in Wugu, New Taipei, Taiwan

New Taipei City Exhibition Hall 新北市工商展覽中心
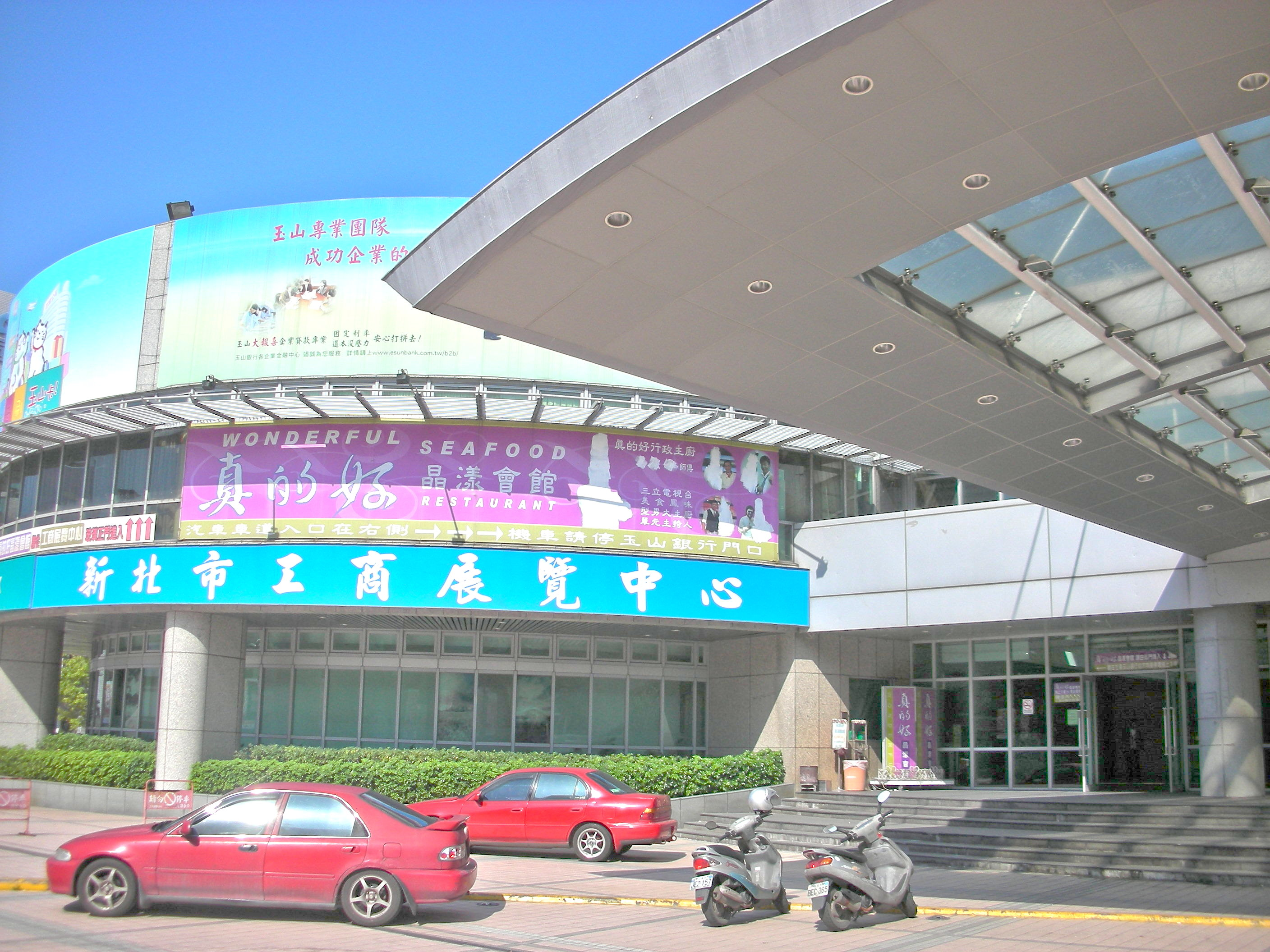
- Interactive map of New Taipei City Exhibition Hall 新北市工商展覽中心
- Location: Wugu, New Taipei, Taiwan
- Coordinates: 25°03′53.8″N 121°26′51.5″E
- Owner: New Taipei City Government
- Operator: Jhan-Sheng Co., Ltd.
- Public transit: Xinzhuang Fuduxin Station

Construction
- Opened: 2001

Website
- Official website (in Chinese)

The New Taipei City Exhibition Hall (traditional Chinese: 新北市工商展覽中心; simplified Chinese: 新北市工商展览中心; pinyin: Xīnběi Shì Gōngshāng Zhǎnlǎn Zhōngxīn) is a convention center in Wugu District, New Taipei, Taiwan.

== Architecture ==
The exhibition hall is a three-story building with two-story parking space.

== Transportation ==
The hall is accessible within walking distance north of Xinzhuang Fuduxin Station of Taoyuan Metro.

== See also ==
- List of convention centers in Taiwan
- List of tourist attractions in Taiwan
