= Shanbi metro station =

Metro station in Luzhu, Taoyuan City, Taiwan

Shanbi A10 山鼻
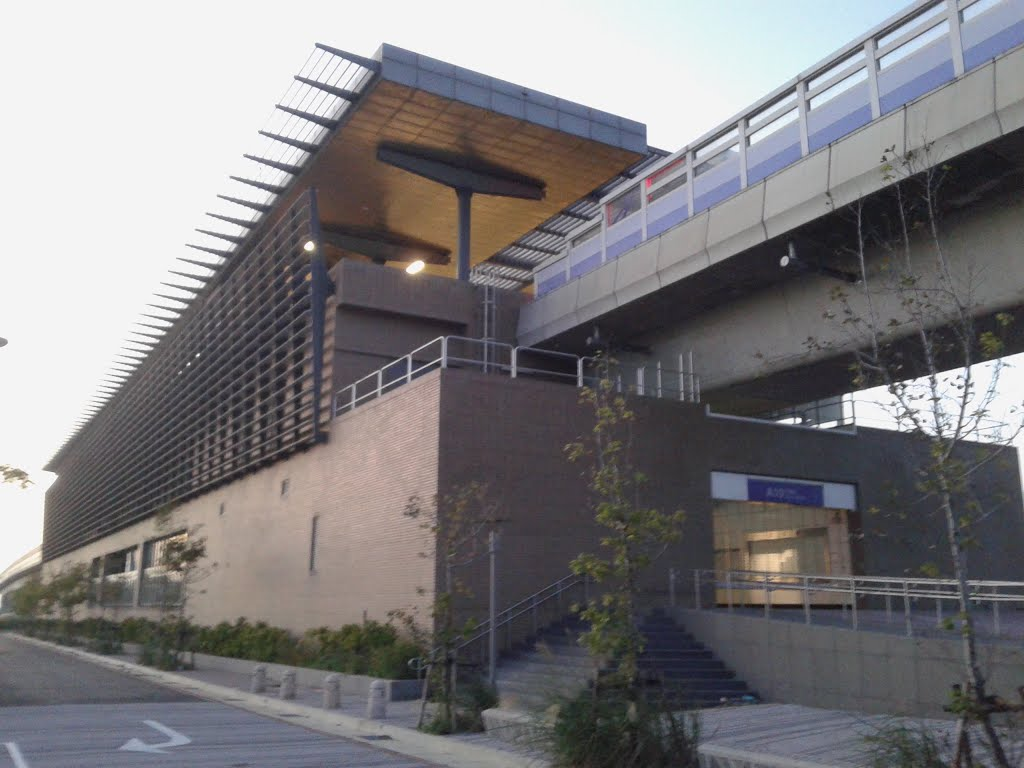

General information
- Location: Luzhu, Taoyuan City, Taiwan
- Coordinates: 25°4′50.9″N 121°17′5.4″E
- Operator: Taoyuan Metro Corporation
- Line: Taoyuan Airport MRT (A10)

Construction
- Structure type: Elevated

Other information
- Station code: A10

History
- Opened: 2 March 2017

Passengers
- Aug 2025: 6,974 (entries and exits, daily)
- Rank: 11/22

Services
Preceding station	Taoyuan Metro	Following station
Linkou towards Taipei Main Station	Taoyuan Airport MRT Commuter	Kengkou towards Laojie River
Taoyuan Airport MRT does not stop here
Location

Shanbi (Chinese: 山鼻站; pinyin: Shānbí Zhàn) is a station on the Taoyuan Airport MRT located in Luzhu District, Taoyuan City, Taiwan. The station opened for commercial service on 2 March 2017.

This elevated station has two side platforms and two tracks. The station is 108.7 metres (357 ft) long and 24.4 metres (80 ft) wide. It opened for trial service on 2 February 2017, and for commercial service 2 March 2017.

== History ==
- 2017-03-02: The station opened for commercial service with the opening of the Taipei-Huanbei section of the Airport MRT.

== Around the station ==
- Shanjiao Elementary School
- Shanjiao Junior High School
- Shanjiao Night Market (600m northeast of the station)
- Linkou Power Plant
- Wu-jiou-tung Mountain Trail (2.4km southeast of the station)

== Exits ==
Exit 1: Section 3, Nanshan Rd

== See also ==
- Taoyuan Metro
