= Taoyuan Airport MRT =

Rapid transit line in northern Taiwan

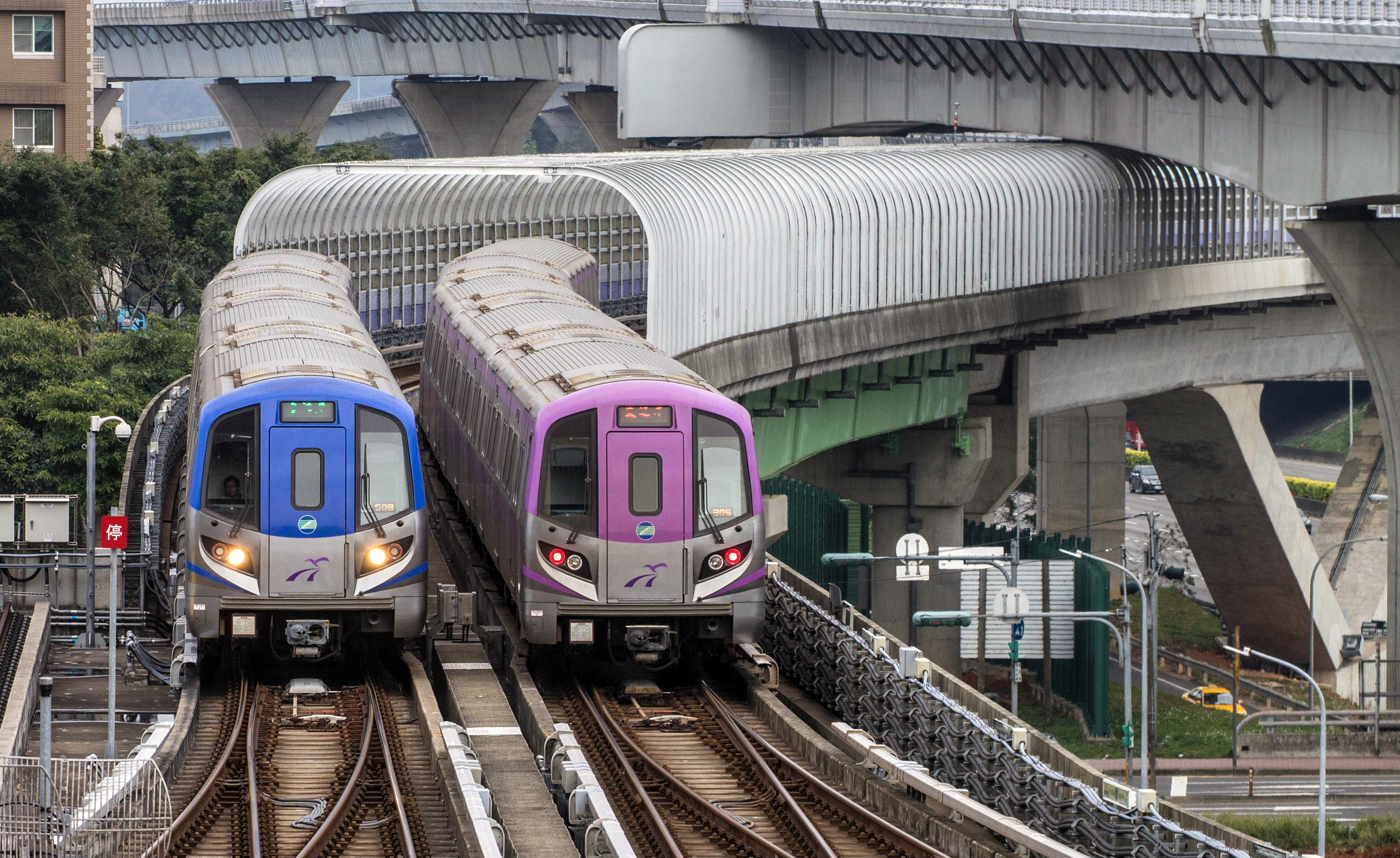
- Taoyuan Metro Commuter train (left) and Express train (right)

Overview
- Other name: Taiwan Taoyuan International Airport Access MRT System (臺灣桃園國際機場聯外捷運系統)
- Native name: 桃園機場捷運
- Status: In service
- Owner: Railway Bureau, MOTC; Taoyuan DORTS
- Line number: A
- Locale: Taipei, New Taipei, and Taoyuan
- Termini: Taipei Main Station; Laojie River (Commuter) Airport Terminal 2 (Express)
- Stations: 22
- Color on map: Commuter: Blue; Express: Purple

Service
- Type: Rapid transit
- System: Taoyuan Metro
- Services: Commuter: Taipei Main Station–Laojie River; Express: Taipei Main Station–Airport Terminal 2
- Operator: Taoyuan Metro Corporation
- Depot(s): Qingpu Depot, Luzhu Depot
- Rolling stock: Commuter: Kawasaki–TRSC 1000 series; Express: Kawasaki 2000 series
- Daily ridership: 127,509 (August 2025)

History
- Opened: 2 March 2017; 9 years ago
- Last extension: 2023

Technical
- Line length: 52.0 km (32.3 mi)
- Character: Elevated and Underground
- Track gauge: 1,435 mm (4 ft 8 1/2 in) standard gauge
- Electrification: 750 V DC third rail
- Operating speed: 100 km/h (62 mph)
- Signalling: Siemens Trainguard MT CBTC (ATC, ATO, ATP)
Route map

Taiwan Taoyuan International Airport MRT
- Traditional Chinese: 臺灣桃園國際機場聯外捷運系統
- Simplified Chinese: 台湾桃园国际机场联外捷运系统
Transcriptions
Standard Mandarin
- Hanyu Pinyin: Táiwān Táoyuán Guójì Jīchǎng Liánwài Jiéyùn Xìtǒng
- Bopomofo: ㄊㄞˊ ㄨㄢ ㄊㄠˊ ㄩㄢˊ ㄍㄨㄛˊ ㄐㄧˋ ㄐㄧ ㄔㄤˇ ㄌㄧㄢˊㄨㄞˋ ㄐㄧㄝˊ ㄩㄣˋ ㄒㄧˋ ㄊㄨㄥˇ
- Wade–Giles: T'ai^{2}-wan^{1} T'ao^{2}-yüan^{2} Kuo^{2}-chi^{4} Chi^{1}-ch'ang^{3} Lien^{2}-wai^{4} Chieh^{2}-yün^{4} Hsi^{4}-t'ung^{3}
- Tongyong Pinyin: Táiwan Táoyuán Guójì Jichǎng Liánwài Jiéyùn Sìtǒng
Hakka
- Pha̍k-fa-sṳ: Thòi-vân Thò-yèn Koet-chi Kî-chhòng Lièn-ngoi Chhia̍p-yun Ne-thúng
Southern Min
- Hokkien POJ: Tâi-oân Thô-hn̂g Kok-chè Ki-tiûⁿ Liân-gōa Chia̍t-ūn Hē-thóng

Taoyuan Airport MRT
- Traditional Chinese: 桃園機場捷運
- Simplified Chinese: 桃园机场捷运
Transcriptions
Standard Mandarin
- Hanyu Pinyin: Táoyuán Jīchǎng Jiéyùn
- Bopomofo: ㄊㄠˊ ㄩㄢˊ ㄐㄧ ㄔㄤˇ ㄐㄧㄝˊ ㄩㄣˋ
- Wade–Giles: T'ao^{2}-yüan^{2} Chi^{1}-ch'ang^{3} Chieh^{2}-yün^{4}
- Tongyong Pinyin: Táoyuán Jichǎng Jiéyùn
Hakka
- Pha̍k-fa-sṳ: Thò-yèn Kî-chhòng Chhia̍p-yun
Southern Min
- Hokkien POJ: Thô-hn̂g Ki-tiûⁿ Chia̍t-ūn

The Taoyuan Airport MRT (Chinese: 桃園機場捷運) is a rapid transit line of the Taoyuan Metro that connects Taipei, Taoyuan and New Taipei with Taoyuan International Airport in northern Taiwan. The 51.33 km (31.89 mi) line has 22 stations, from Taipei Main Station to Laojie River, and began commercial service on 2 March 2017.

Commuter and Express services operate on the line, which features in-town check-in and baggage check at Taipei Main Station and at New Taipei Industrial Park.

An extension to Zhongli railway station via Laojie River from the current terminus at Huanbei is under construction. The Laojie River metro station opened in July 2023, and the full extension is scheduled for completion in 2028.

== Route ==
The Taoyuan Airport MRT route starts from Taipei Main Station and heads west, passing through Sanchong, Taishan, Xinzhuang, Guishan, Linkou, and Luzhu before reaching Taoyuan International Airport, after which the route turns south to Taoyuan HSR station before terminating at Laojie River in Zhongli. The route is currently 53.07 km (32.98 mi) long with 22 total stations, of which 7 are underground and 15 are elevated; (Note: including the soon to be opened underground station for Airport Terminal 3.) approximately 12.96 km (8.05 mi) of the line is underground while the remaining 40.11 km (24.92 mi) is elevated. There are two maintenance depots along the line: Qingpu Depot (near Linghang) and Luzhu Depot (near Kengkou).

== Operations ==
Two types of services are offered: Commuter and Express. Commuter trains have a blue livery and stop at all stations, while Express trains have a purple livery and focus on serving passengers using Taoyuan International Airport (TPE), stopping at just two stations between Taipei Main Station and the airport, they are New Taipei Industrial Park and Chang Gung Memorial Hospital. Express trains reach TPE from Taipei Main Station in 35 to 37 minutes depending on the terminal, with a 15-minute headway at all times. While nearly all Express train services only run between Taipei Main Station and TPE, a few services during weekday rush hours and weekend afternoons (Note: Express bound for Huanbei Service July 2020 schedule: From Chang Gung Memorial Hospital, 1 journey only: Weekday, 0606, From Taipei, 5-6 daily services: weekday, 0700, 0800, 1600, 1700, 1800; weekend, 1300, 1400, 1500, 1600, 1700, 1800. From Huanbei, six daily services: weekday, 0729, 0814, 0914, 1714, 1814, 1914; weekend, 1414, 1514, 1614, 1714, 1814, 1914.) run to Huanbei with only one additional stop at Taoyuan HSR station, with an end-to-end travel time of 64 minutes. Commuter trains have a 15-minute headway at all times and serve the full route to Laojie River in 82 minutes.

Express trains have transverse row seating with underseat storage for luggage as well as three luggage racks per car; Commuter trains have longitudinal seating without underseat storage and only have two luggage racks per car. Both services feature free wi-fi as well as flight information display systems showing status of departing flights at TPE, although there are more displays on Express trains. Express trains also offer wireless charging stations.

=== In-town check-in ===
In-town check-in and baggage check services are available at Taipei Main Station and New Taipei Industrial Park. Baggage handling equipment is installed, including check-in counters, conveyor belts, container handling equipment, container elevators, and control systems. Baggage is transported from the check-in counter into containers, which are loaded onto Express trains. Checked baggage is delivered to Terminal Two, where it is scanned and directed to the appropriate airline.

=== Flight information ===
Flight information display systems, which also carry information on Taiwan Railway and THSR services from transfer stations, are installed at all stations served by Express trains from Taipei Main Station to TPE, as well as at Taoyuan HSR station.

=== Fares ===
Fares on the Taoyuan Airport MRT are based on distance traveled and there is no fare difference between Commuter and Express services. Published one-way fares range from NT$30 to NT$160, with fares from Taipei Main Station to TPE priced at NT$160 and fares from Taoyuan HSR station to TPE priced at NT$30. Since October 2018, a NT$10 promotional discount on all published one-way fares has been applied due to the operational profitability of the line since service began.

30, 60, 90, and 120-day periodic tickets allowing unlimited rides on the Taoyuan Airport MRT within specified station pairs are available, priced at a 30, 35, 40, or 50% discount, respectively, on the price of 21 published round-trip fares between the specified station pairs per 30-day period (21 being the approximate average number of weekdays per month).

Trips between airport stations, and between the airport stations and the airport hotel station, are free when using an IC card at the automatic gates.

== Rolling stock ==
=== Passenger electric multiple units ===
Kawasaki manufactured all Express trains and seven Commuter train sets in Japan, while Taiwan Rolling Stock Company (TRSC) manufactured the remaining Commuter train sets. The car body is constructed from stainless steel and each car is supplied with 750 V DC electricity from a third rail, powered by IGBT–VVVF inverters and conventional 3-phase AC induction motors provided by Mitsubishi Electric, and controlled with Siemens Mobility's Trainguard MT communications-based train control (CBTC) system, which has subsystems of automatic train control (ATC), automatic train operation (ATO) and automatic train protection (ATP).

Of the 41 train sets, 18 are Express trains while 23 are Commuter trains. Four-car configurations are used for Commuter trains, while Express trains have five-car configurations due to an extra baggage car. Commuter train cars have 50 longitudinal seats with two wheelchair areas and two luggage racks. Express train cars are equipped with 54 seats with one wheelchair area and three luggage racks. Each train car has three doors per side except for baggage cars which have five doors per side; baggage cars have an onboard baggage handling system including control equipment.

=== Fleet roster ===
All trains have open-gangway connections.

Class	Image	Year built	Builder	Capacity	Routes operated	Formation	Top speed (km/h)		Fleet total	Set numbers
Class	Image	Year built	Builder	Capacity	Routes operated	Formation	Design	Service	Fleet total	Set numbers
1000		2011–	Kawasaki; TRSC (Note: 1002~1017 only)	1116	Commuter	4-car sets DM1-M1-M2-DM2	110	100	23 (Note: 3 constructing)	1001~1023 (Note: 1021~1023 under construction)
2000		2011–	Kawasaki	855	Express	5-car sets DM1-M1-M2-M3-DM2	110	100	18 (Note: 7 constructing)	2001~2018 (Note: 2012~2018 under construction)

=== Engineering trains ===
Taoyuan Metro uses a specialized fleet of engineering trains supplied by Hokuriku Heavy Industries for maintenance of way. Some of these trains include rail crane wagons, rail inspection vehicles, and 60-ton rescue locomotives.

In April 2017, Taoyuan Metro borrowed an ultrasonic flaw detection vehicle from Taipei Metro to conduct comprehensive inspections on its rail tracks after a crack was discovered on a track point at the emergency halt between Linkou and Shanbi. At that time, Taoyuan Metro only had a hand-pushed ultrasonic inspection device for such purposes.

== History ==
A rail system to connect Taoyuan International Airport with existing transportation hubs was proposed as early as the 1980s and reemphasized over the years in government proclamations such as the New Ten Major Construction Projects.

The metro route was originally planned to be constructed as a BOT project; in 1998, the project was auctioned to Evertransit International Development Corp. (長生國際開發), a subsidiary of Ever Fortune Industrial Co. (長億實業). However, the company failed to begin the construction, and in 2003, the government cancelled the contract. After the BOT project failed to go through, the Ministry of Transportation and Communications (MOTC) decided to build the line directly from the government budget.

MOTC originally planned for the line to be transferred to the Taiwan Railway Administration (TRA) to operate; President Ma Ying-jeou had also proposed the Bureau of High Speed Rail (BOHSR) (Note: BOHSR later merged into the MOTC Railway Bureau.) to operate the line with the Taipei Rapid Transit Corporation (TRTC) and the TRA. Later, the TRA announced they would not be able to operate the line so the MOTC asked TRTC to operate the line or have the Taoyuan City Government create the Taoyuan Rapid Transit Corporation to operate the line.

=== Taipei terminus change and design ===
The terminus in Taipei was originally planned for Ximen but was changed to Taipei Main Station to facilitate transfers to TRA, THSR, and Taipei Metro, as well as other transportation modes including bus services at the adjacent Taipei Bus Station. However, there were disagreements between MOTC and the Taipei City Government over the precise location of the station platform within the Taipei Main Station area; MOTC preferred an elevated platform just north of Taipei Main Station while the city wanted an underground platform just west of the main station, across Chengde Road. The MOTC's elevated platform proposal was less expensive and faster to construct, but the city objected as the platform and track would have obstructed the scenery of the surrounding area. The two sides eventually compromised, agreeing to the underground platform proposal but with the Taipei City Government covering the additional cost. The revised project was approved in September 2004.

The Taipei Main Station terminus of the Taoyuan Airport MRT was built under the future Taipei Towers development and was designed by architect Fumihiko Maki. The station itself extends five stories underground. The diaphragm wall is 53 metres (173 ft 11 in) deep and excavation depth was around 27 metres (88 ft 7 in). Four underground levels were constructed: three for the terminus of the station and one for a parking lot. China Engineering Consultants, Inc. (CECI) won the contract for construction of the Taipei City section of the Taoyuan Airport MRT, including construction of the station and platform at the Taipei terminus, through public appraisal on 8 July 2005. Redevelopment of the 47 hectares (116 acres) area will consist of retail, office, and hotel components.

=== Construction and development ===
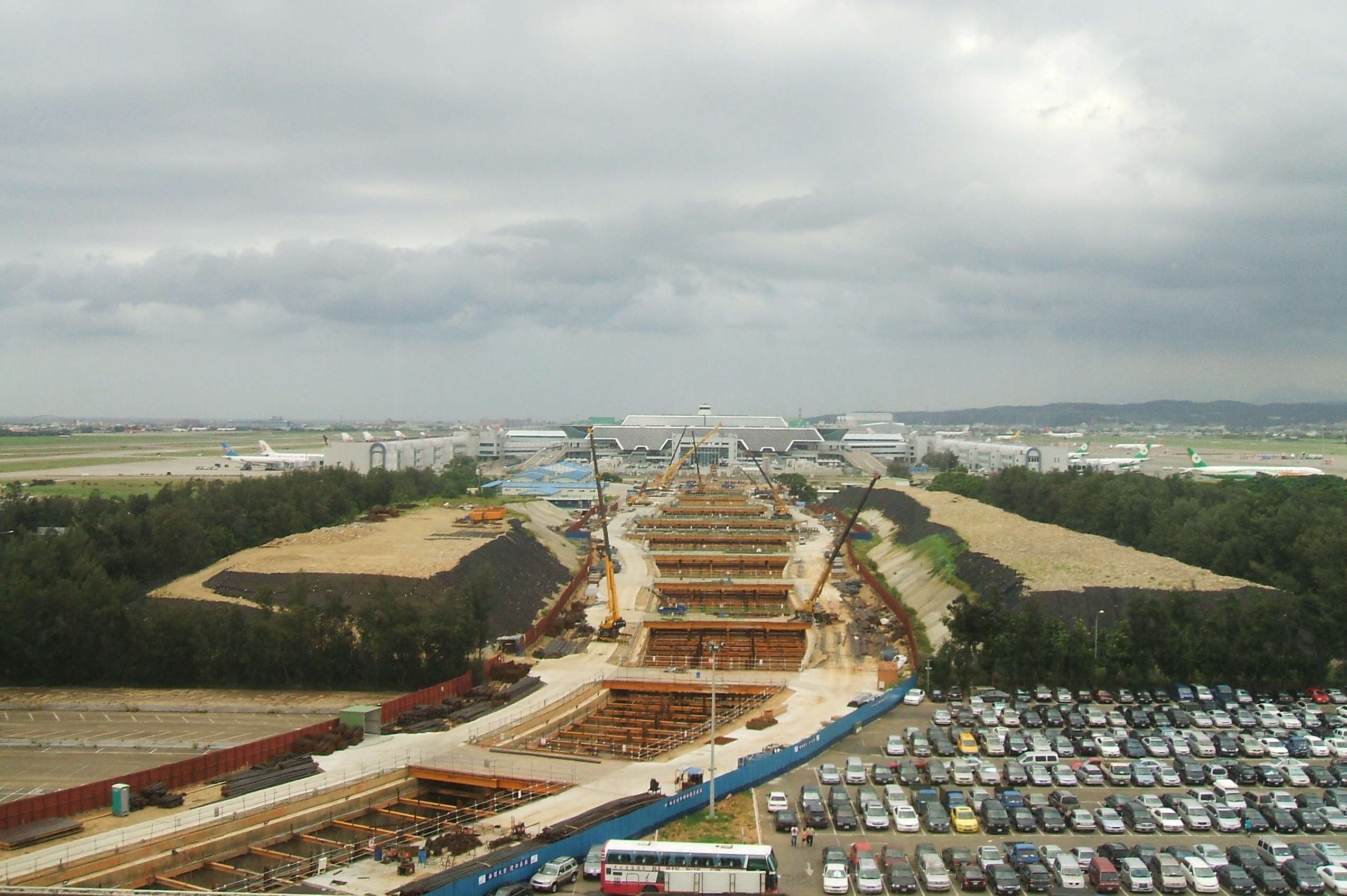
Airport MRT under construction under the future site of Taoyuan Airport Terminal 3 (2009)

The BOHSR of the MOTC oversaw construction, which began in 2006 and was scheduled for completion in 2013 but was plagued by multiple delays. The entire system was budgeted at NT$113.85 billion.

Land acquisition for the Sanchong City section totaled 2.07 ha (5.12 acres) and cost NT$1.4 billion, including land and buildings.

In addition to tracks and stations, joint development projects have been constructed to boost development around stations. A special industrial zone was planned around the THSR Taoyuan Station area. In April 2011, Kingdom Construction Corp. signed a contract to construct a 16-story residential and commercial building near Linkou Station.

==== Civil engineering ====
The design of core E&M systems (including rolling stock, power supply, signaling, communications, depot equipment, platform screen doors, etc.) and the design and construction of two depots (Qingpu and Luzhu) were awarded as part of a contract worth NT$25.5 billion. Hitachi, in cooperation with Marubeni Corporation and Kawasaki Heavy Industries, won the bid for the E&M systems and signed the contract on 12 January 2006. The groundbreaking ceremony for the power supply system was held on 1 October 2010 on behalf of five contractor companies including Hitachi. Motorola supplied the digital radio communications system for the line.

The power supply for the system is drawn from two Taiwan Power Company 161 kV supplies at three Bulk Supply Substations (BSS); one incoming line serves as the main power supply while the other serves a backup. One substation (A8) is located between Chang Gung Memorial Hospital and Linkou. The main RC structure was completed in March 2011, while civil engineering was finished at the end of October. The automatic fare collection system contract was awarded to Mercuries Data Systems (MDS) on 22 October 2010 for NT$355 million.

Platform screen doors are installed at all underground stations, while elevated stations are equipped with automatic platform gates.

==== Track ====
A large portion (78.6%) of the route length is constructed on 9.3 m (30 ft 6 in)-wide viaducts, which is used in both dense urban districts as well as rural areas with steep slopes. The route features both single-tracked and double-tracked viaducts; single-tracked viaducts were constructed with a standard span of 30 m (98 ft 5 in) with mobile cranes while double-tracked viaducts were constructed using an advanced shoring technique for either 35 m (114 ft 10 in) or 60 m (196 ft 10 in) spans. A 4 m (13 ft 1 in) noise barrier wall is used on all viaducts, and floating track beds are used for environmentally-sensitive zones. During construction, some residents in Xinzhuang expressed concern over the 7 to 9-story high elevated track and its stability during potential earthquakes. The Bureau of High Speed Rail responded that due to a base that penetrates 20–30 m (65 ft 7 in – 98 ft 5 in) into the ground, the tracks could withstand earthquake shake intensity over 5 without a problem. By July 2011, the last of the line's elevated support pillars were erected and by August 2011, construction of the elevated viaducts were completed.

RAIL.ONE Group provided the ballastless track system for the line. 150,000 modified bi-block type B 355 ties were delivered for the line. The first set arrived between July and December 2010, while the last set began production in March 2011.

A section crossing over National Highway No. 1 employs a V-shaped support system (instead of the usual vertical supports) and began construction in July 2009.

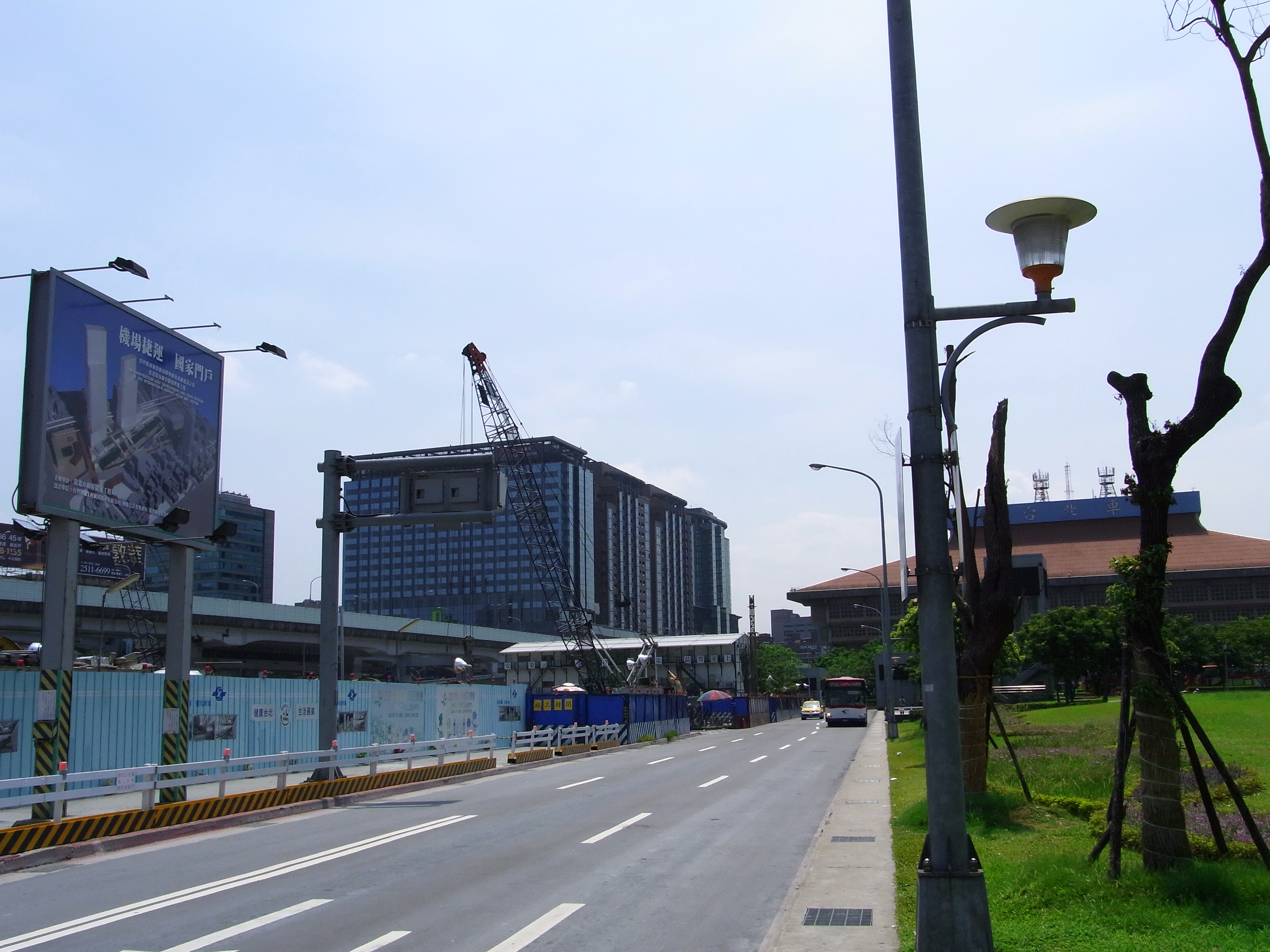
Construction near A1 Taipei Main Station (2009)

==== Taoyuan Airport section ====
The airport section consists of four underground stations (Airport Terminal 1, Airport Terminal 2, Airport Hotel, and the future Airport Terminal 3 station) and is 6.85 km (4.26 mi) long. Both cut-and-cover and shield tunneling were used for tunnel construction. Since shield tunnels were constructed underneath existing taxiways and the control tower area, an automatic system was integrated to monitor any soil and structure impact in real-time so that immediate response could be taken to any disruption. In the same section, secondary grouting and a micro-pile cut-off wall was used to reinforce the tunnels. In addition, a floating track bed was used for the tracks crossing these areas to reduce vibrations. Continental Engineering Corporation constructed the underground stations and the tunnels in this section.

Five shield tunneling sections totaling 3,600 m (11,811 ft 0 in) and 1,630 m (5,347 ft 9 in) of cut-and-cover sections were excavated. Arrival areas near the MRT departure areas were constructed.

==== Tunneling under the Tamsui River ====
The section passing below Tamsui River (about 1 km (0.62 mi) in length) employed the shield-tunneling method. The double-O-tube (DOT) shield tunnel machine was used for the first time in Taiwan. The 1.58 km (0.98 mi)-long tunnels took 1 year to dig, and were completed in December 2010.

==== Chingshan Road section ====
This section was built along a steep roadside slope. Traditional construction methods would greatly increase the difficulty, cost, and excavation area necessary to build an elevated line through the area. In order to reduce environmental impact and cut construction time, a bamboo-cut treatment was used in construction to keep the slope intact. Top ring girders 11.4 m (37 ft 5 in) in diameter were used to gradually excavate the area, after which a 10 m (32 ft 10 in) diameter foundation can be placed. A total of 15 bamboo-cut foundations were constructed, ranging from a height of 5.88 to 16.35 m (19 ft 3 in to 53 ft 8 in). By June 2010, the contractor (Fu Tsu Corporation) had completed 13 of the 15 bases, with the additional two under construction.

=== Trial operations ===
Trial operations between Taipei and Huanbei began on 2 February 2017. 1.4 million passengers used the system during this period, double the expected 700,000 passengers.

== Route extension and future stations ==
=== Zhongli railway station extension ===
In December 2008, the MOTC announced that the system would be extended to Zhongli Sports Park, but was later changed to Zhongli Station in order to facilitate transfers to TRA services. After the Zhongli Sports Park station was canceled, MOTC changed it to having the Taoyuan Metro Green Line to extend to Zhongli Station via Zhongli Sports Park. The extension also includes one intermediate station, Laojie River, which opened in July 2023. The full extension to Zhongli Station is scheduled for completion in 2028. A 2011 report by the Council for Economic Planning and Development estimated the total project cost at NT$13.801 billion, including the extension as well as development of the surrounding areas.

=== Erchong station (A2a) ===
Erchong station is a planned station along the existing Taoyuan Airport MRT line between the Sanchong and New Taipei Industrial Park stations, near Erchong Riverside Park. While the Taoyuan Airport MRT was in proposal stages, Sanchong residents living in the Boai New Community requested an additional station be added to the route, at the time presumptively named Boai (station code A2a). In order not to delay opening of the rest of the Taoyuan Airport MRT, space along the line was reserved for future construction of the proposed station. The total cost of the station has been estimated at NT$2.24 billion, with NT$1.94 billion for the station itself and NT$300 million for a necessary extension to the Erchong flood diversion wall, with an estimated completion in 2016. As of 2020, the planned station is named Erchong and is in the final approval stages with the Taoyuan City Government.

=== Fu Jen University Hospital station (A5a) ===
Fu Jen University Hospital station is a planned station along the existing line between the Taishan and Taishan Guihe stations. While the Taoyuan Airport MRT track passes just by Fu Jen Catholic University Hospital, the location of the proposed eponymous station is approximately a half-mile from the hospital. The station was proposed by MOTC in 2006 following public demands, and space along the line was reserved for the station during construction while feasibility studies were conducted. As of 2020, the project is in the final approval stages at the Taoyuan City Government.

This station could also transfer to Wugu–Taishan light rail in the future.

== Stations ==
Several stations were selected for public art installations.

Code	Station name	Station type		Locale		Sta. distance (km)		Opened date	Transfer
Code	Station name	Structure	Platform	Locale		Previous	Total	Opened date	Transfer
Taoyuan Airport MRT
A1	Taipei Main Station 台北車站	Underground	Double Island	Zhongzheng	Taipei	—N/a	0.00	2017–3–2	Taiwan High Speed Rail (Taipei); Western Trunk line (Taipei); Tamsui–Xinyi Line (R10); Bannan Line (BL12); Songshan–Xindian Line (G13)
A2	Sanchong 三重	Elevated	Island	Sanchong	New Taipei	4.236	4.236	2017–3–2	Zhonghe–Xinlu Line
A2a	Unreleased	Elevated	Unreleased	Sanchong	New Taipei	1.600	5.836	Planning	—N/a
A3	New Taipei Industrial Park 新北產業園區	Elevated	Double island	Xinzhuang	New Taipei	2.193	7.729	2017–3–2	Circular Line
A4	Xinzhuang Fuduxin 新莊副都心	Elevated	Side	Xinzhuang	New Taipei	1.369	9.098	2017–3–2	—N/a
A5	Taishan 泰山	Elevated	Side	Taishan	New Taipei	0.931	10.029	2017–3–2	—N/a
A5a	Unreleased	Elevated	Side	Taishan	New Taipei	1.100	11.129	Planning	Wugu-Taishan LRT; Taishan-Banqiao LRT
A6	Taishan Guihe 泰山貴和	Elevated	Side	Taishan	New Taipei	1.704	12.833	2017–3–2	—N/a
A7	National Taiwan Sport University 體育大學	Underground	Side	Guishan	Taoyuan	4.570	17.403	2017–3–2	—N/a
A8	Chang Gung Memorial Hospital 長庚醫院	Elevated	Double island	Guishan	Taoyuan	2.742	20.145	2017–3–2	—N/a
A9	Linkou 林口	Elevated	Side	Linkou	New Taipei	1.205	21.350	2017–3–2	—N/a
A10	Shanbi 山鼻	Elevated	Side	Luzhu	Taoyuan	8.395	29.745	2017–3–2	—N/a
A11	Kengkou 坑口	Elevated	Double island	Luzhu	Taoyuan	1.976	31.721	2017–3–2	Green line
A12	Airport Terminal 1 機場第一航廈	Underground	Island	Dayuan	Taoyuan	3.155	34.876	2017–3–2	—N/a
A13	Airport Terminal 2 機場第二航廈	Underground	Side	Dayuan	Taoyuan	1.020	35.896	2017–3–2	—N/a
A14	Airport Terminal 3 機場第三航廈	Underground	Hybrid	Dayuan	Taoyuan	1.336	Unreleased	Est. 2027	—N/a
A14a	Airport Hotel 機場旅館	Underground	Island	Dayuan	Taoyuan	1.336	37.232	2017–3–2	—N/a
A15	Dayuan 大園	Elevated	Side	Dayuan	Taoyuan	1.898	39.130	2017–3–2	—N/a
A16	Hengshan 橫山	Elevated	Side	Dayuan	Taoyuan	2.250	41.380	2017–3–2	Green line
A17	Linghang 領航	Elevated	Double island	Dayuan	Taoyuan	1.580	42.960	2017–3–2	—N/a
A18	Taoyuan HSR Station 高鐵桃園站	Elevated	Side	Zhongli	Taoyuan	1.610	44.570	2017–3–2	Taiwan High Speed Rail
A19	Taoyuan Sports Park 桃園體育園區	Elevated	Side	Zhongli	Taoyuan	1.740	46.310	2017–3–2	—N/a
A20	Xingnan 興南	Elevated	Side	Zhongli	Taoyuan	2.960	49.270	2017–3–2	—N/a
A21	Huanbei 環北	Underground	Island	Zhongli	Taoyuan	1.540	50.810	2017–3–2	Orange line
A22	Laojie River 老街溪	Underground	Island	Zhongli	Taoyuan	0.950	51.760	2023–7–31	—N/a
A23	Zhongli Railway Station 中壢車站	Underground	Island	Zhongli	Taoyuan	Unreleased		Est. 2028–7	Zhongli extension line Western Trunk line

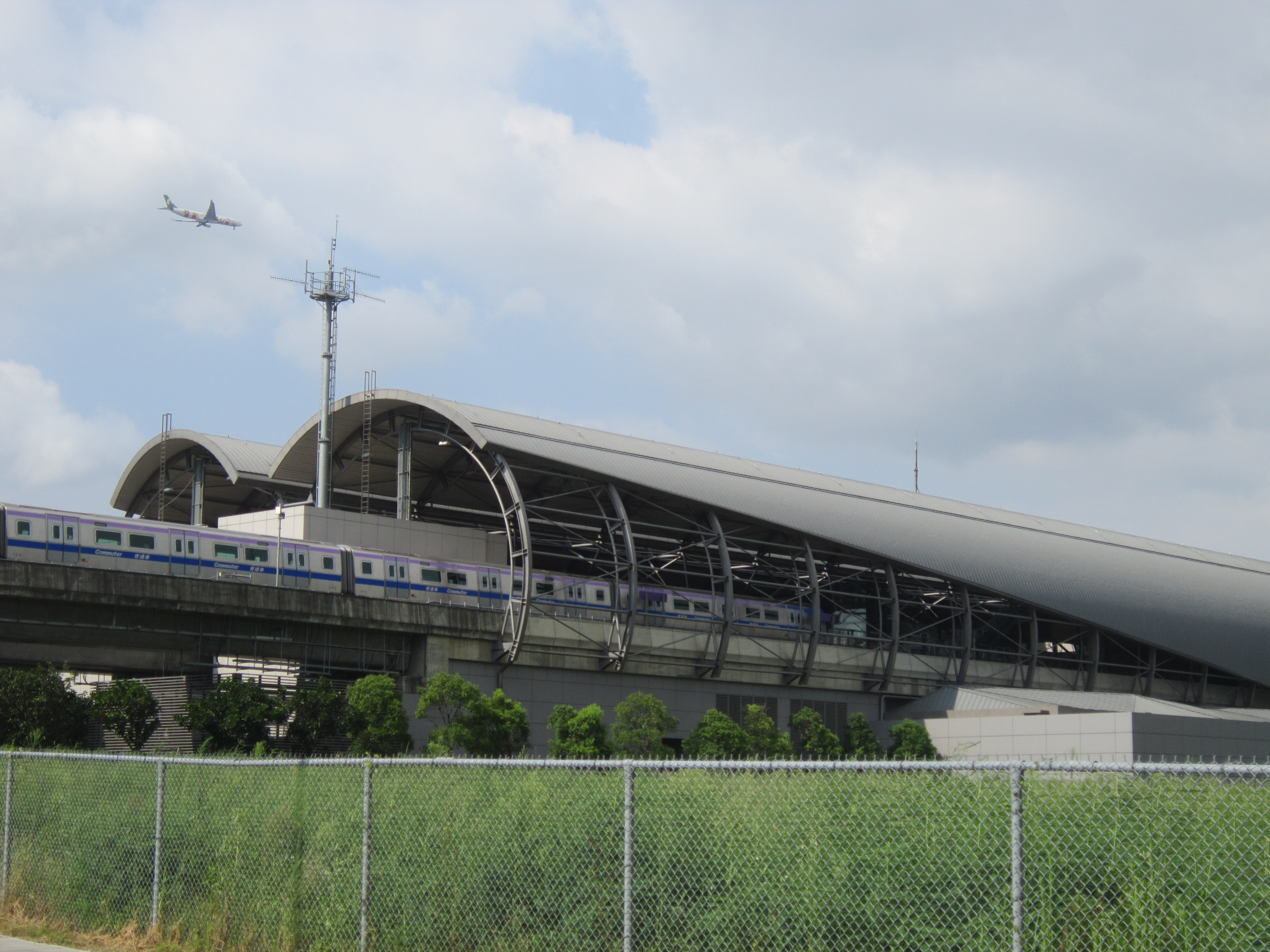
A Commuter train leaving New Taipei Industrial Park

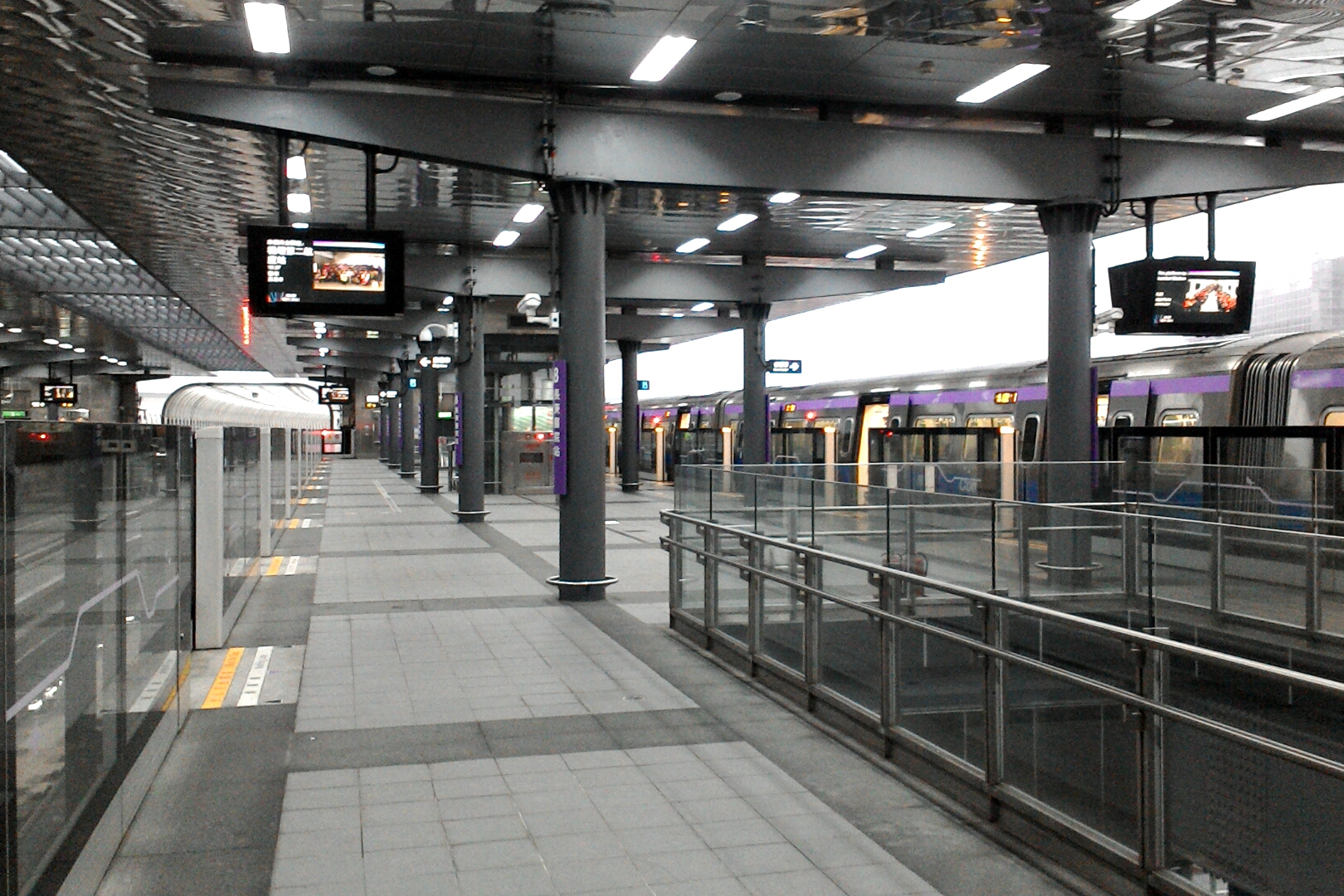
Chang Gung Memorial Hospital platform

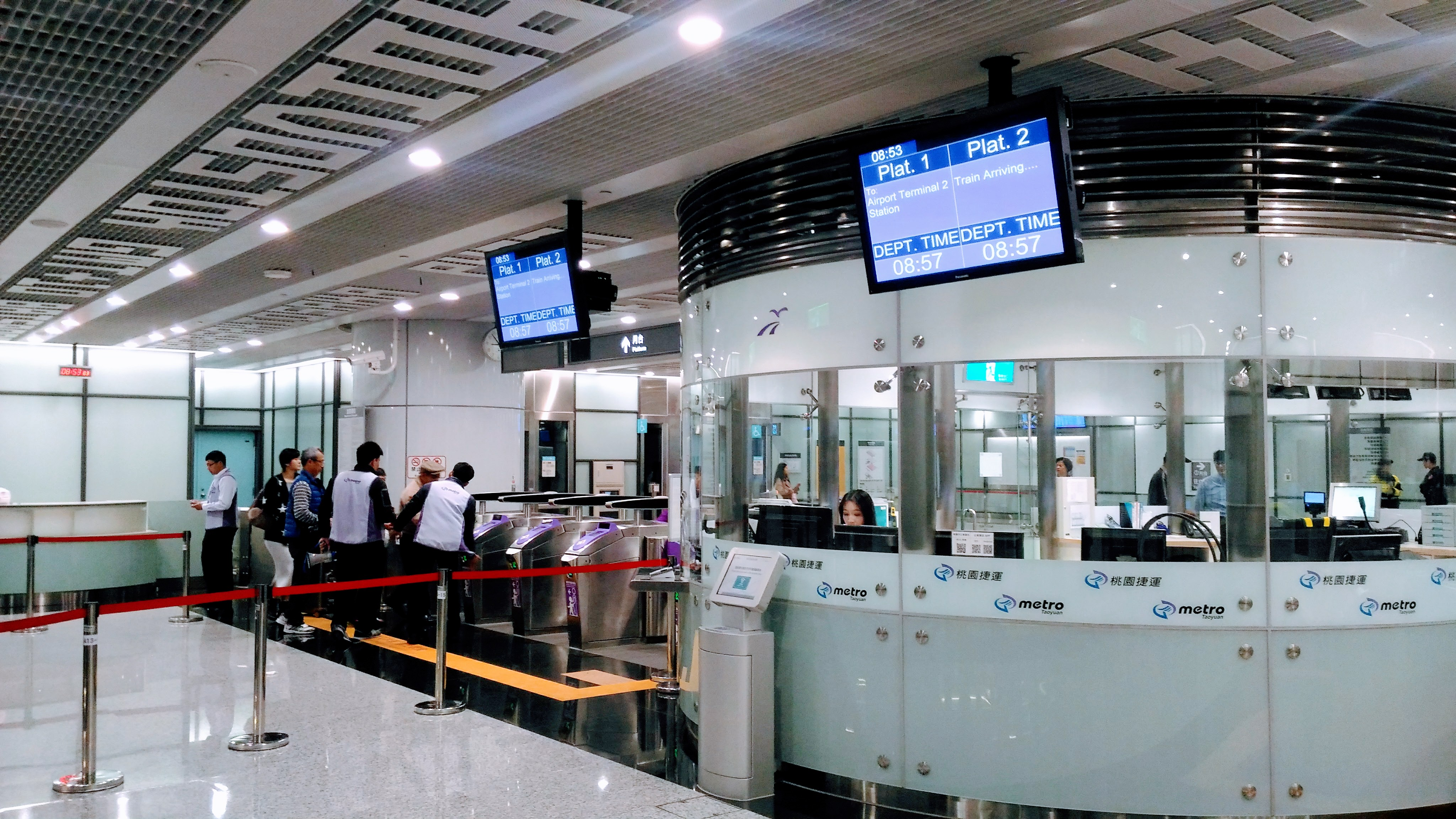
Airport Terminal 2 faregates and information booth

== Ridership ==
The table below shows the average daily ridership per month.

	Jan	Feb	Mar	Apr	May	Jun	Jul	Aug	Sep	Oct	Nov	Dec	Year
2017	－	－	66,715 (Note: Ticket price 50% off during the first month of operation)	57,431	53,075	52,485	53,358	57,981	52,379	57,652	53,890	63,706	56,867
2018	57,791	60,313	60,643	60,929	58,498	61,665	62,701	67,357	64,353	65,941	67,647	75,058	63,575
2019	69,360	71,525	70,824	72,810	72,080	75,929	77,830	79,805	76,235	83,208	79,969	89,204	76,565
2020	82,810	58,868	40,737	33,621	37,933	43,162	48,160	53,257	51,550	51,720	51,668	53,423	50,576
2021	46,793	41,855	49,168	50,673	27,172	14,197	18,872	29,476	33,598	42,215	46,668	51,258	37,662
2022	40,012	39,098	47,692	39,609	30,877	36,888	44,951	48,921	48,863	53,097	61,492	72,154	46,971
2023	69,207	74,697	78,160	79,755	80,102	84,347	92,396	100,574	100,648	104,648	107,033	109,808	90,115
2024	107,359	107,957	113,774	109,348	111,176	112,685	108,788	117,122	115,527	113,230	125,923	130,532	114,418
2025	117,976	148,634	125,347	125,655	122,382	123,543	122,431	127,509					

== See also ==
- Taipei Metro
- Taoyuan Metro
- Rail transport in Taiwan
