= Huanbei metro station =

Rapid transit stop in Taiwan

Huanbei A21 環北
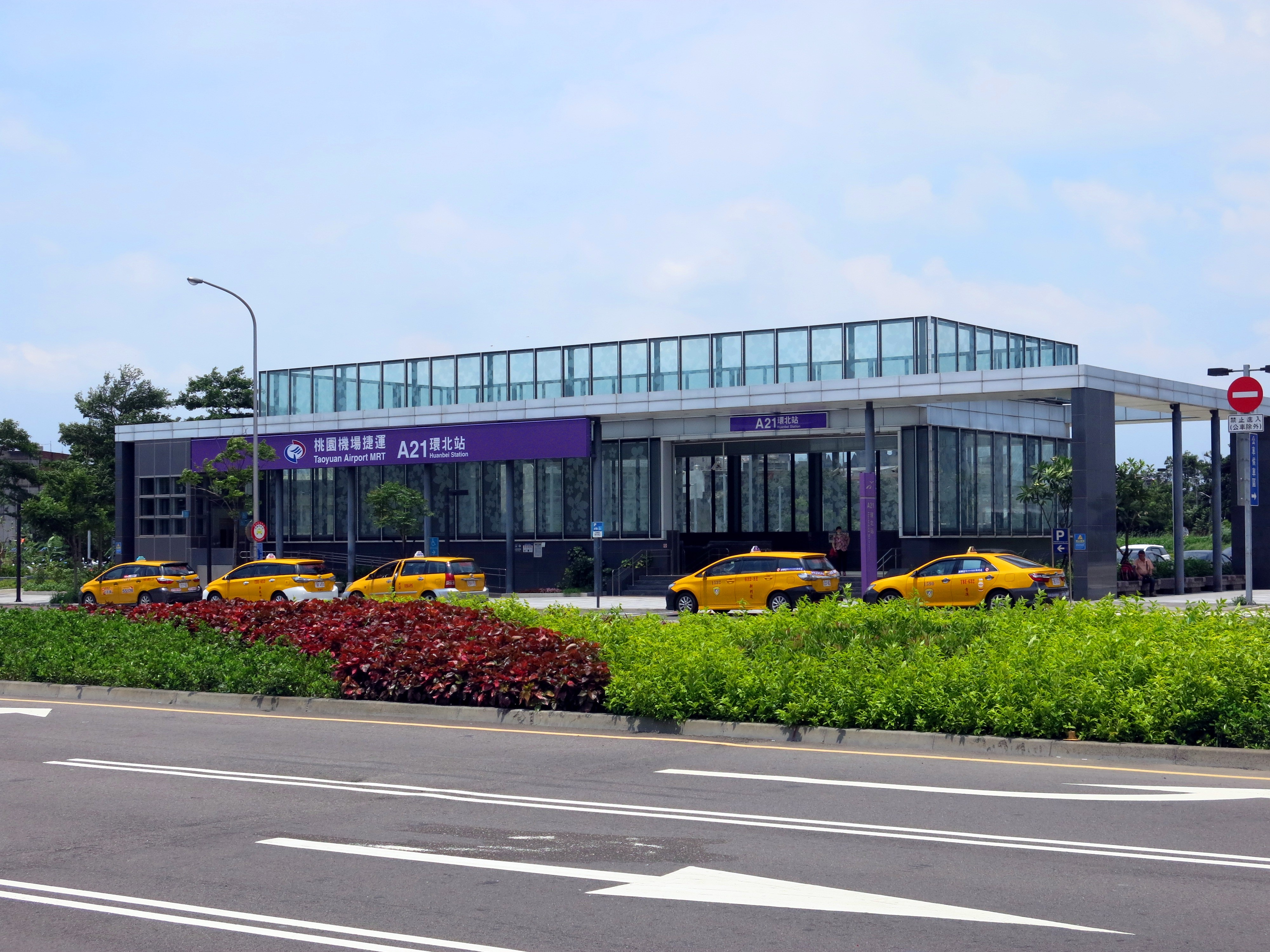
- Station entrance

General information
- Location: 26 Sec 1 Zhongfeng N Rd; Zhongli, Taoyuan City; Taiwan
- Coordinates: 24°58′1.41″N 121°13′15.75″E
- Operated by: Taoyuan Metro Corporation
- Line: Taoyuan Airport MRT (A21)

Construction
- Structure type: Underground

Other information
- Station code: A21

History
- Opened: 2017-03-02

Passengers
- Aug 2025: 4,617 (entries and exits, daily)
- Rank: 16/22

Services
Preceding station	Taoyuan Metro	Following station
Xingnan towards Taipei Main Station	Taoyuan Airport MRT Commuter	Laojie River Terminus
Taoyuan HSR station towards Taipei Main Station	Taoyuan Airport MRT Express	Terminus
Location

Huanbei (Chinese: 環北) is a station on the Taoyuan Airport MRT located in Zhongli, Taoyuan City, Taiwan. It opened for commercial service on 2 March 2017.

== Overview ==
This underground station has one island platform with two tracks. Commuter trains stop at this station, with some limited peak-hour express trains terminating here. The station is 182 metres (597 ft) long and 16.4 metres (54 ft) wide. It opened for trial service on 2 February 2017, and for commercial service on 2 March 2017. It is a planned transfer station with the Taoyuan Metro Orange Line (O09).

Construction on the station began on 12 December 2007, and it opened for commercial service on 2 March 2017 with the opening of the Taipei-Huanbei section of the Airport MRT.

== Around the station ==
- Laojie River (160m southwest of the station)
- SOGO Zhongli Store (850m southeast of the station)
- Zhongli Tourist Night Market (1.1km southwest of the station)

== Exits ==
- Exit 1: Section 1, Zhongfeng North Road

== See also ==
- Taoyuan Metro
