= Laojie River metro station =

Rapid transit stop in Taiwan

Laojie River A22 老街溪
- Platform

General information
- Location: Zhongli District, Taoyuan City; Taiwan
- Coordinates: 24.9584°N 121.2195°E
- Operator: Taoyuan Metro Corporation
- Line: Taoyuan Airport MRT (A22)
- Platforms: 2

Construction
- Structure type: Underground

Other information
- Station code: A22

History
- Opened: 2023-07-31

Passengers
- Aug 2025: 7,909 (entries and exits, daily)
- Rank: 10/22

Services
Preceding station	Taoyuan Metro	Following station
Huanbei towards Taipei Main Station	Taoyuan Airport MRT Commuter	Terminus
Location

Laojie River (Chinese: 老街溪) is a station on the Taoyuan Airport MRT located in Zhongli District, Taoyuan City, Taiwan. The station opened for commercial service on 31 July 2023. It is the current western terminus of the line.

== Overview ==
This underground station has one island platform with two tracks, and is served by all-stop commuter services. It is a planned transfer station with the Taoyuan Metro Yellow line (Y01).

Construction on the station began in March 2013, and it opened for commercial service on 31 July 2023 with the opening of the Huanbei-Laojie River section of the Airport MRT.

== Exits ==
- Exit 1: Laojie River Riverside Park
- Exit 2: Zhongfeng Road and Sec. 1 Jungyang West Road intersection

== Gallery ==
Exit 1

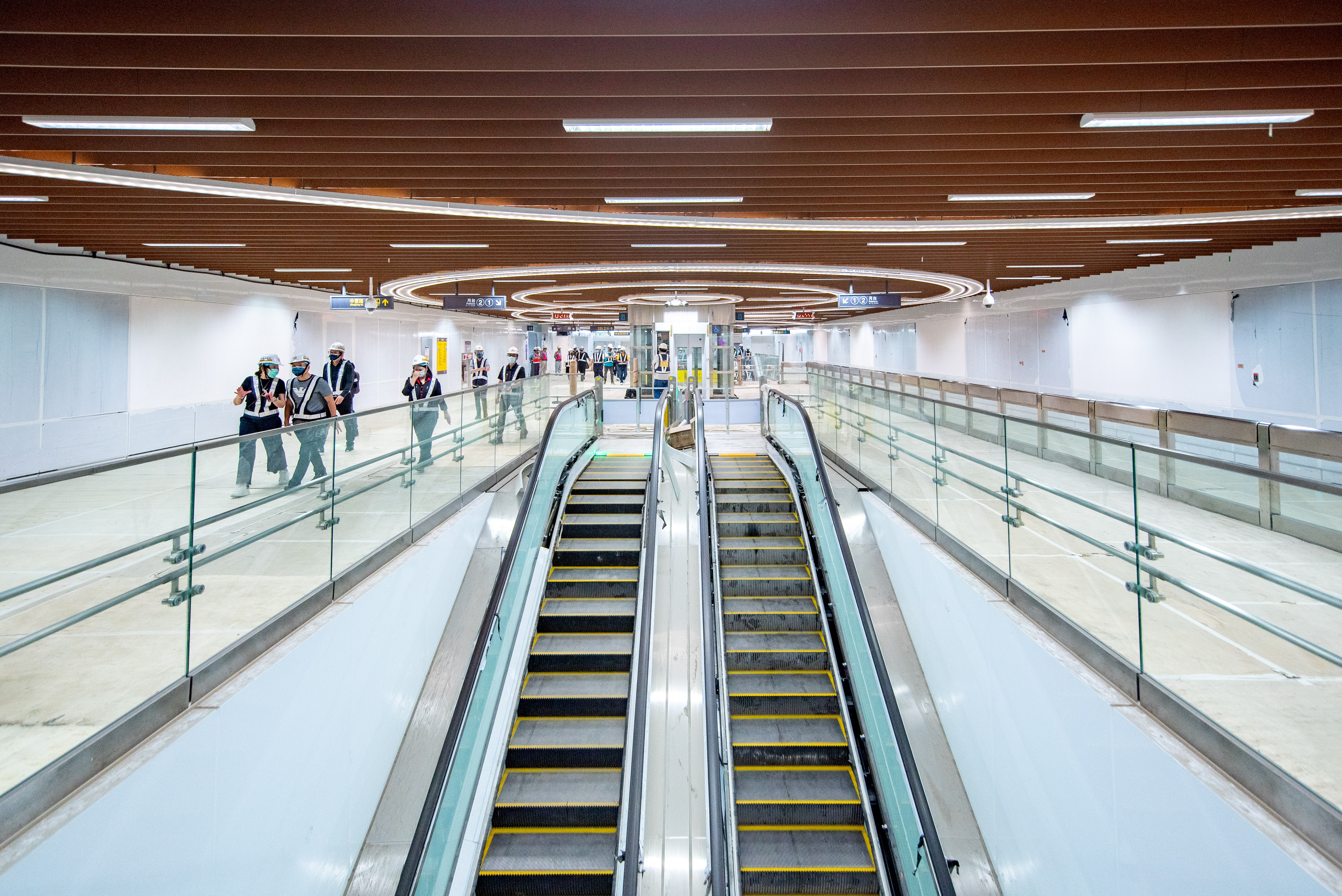
Station concourse

== See also ==
- Taoyuan Metro
