= Hengshan metro station =

Metro station in Taoyuan, Taiwan

Hengshan A16/G18 橫山
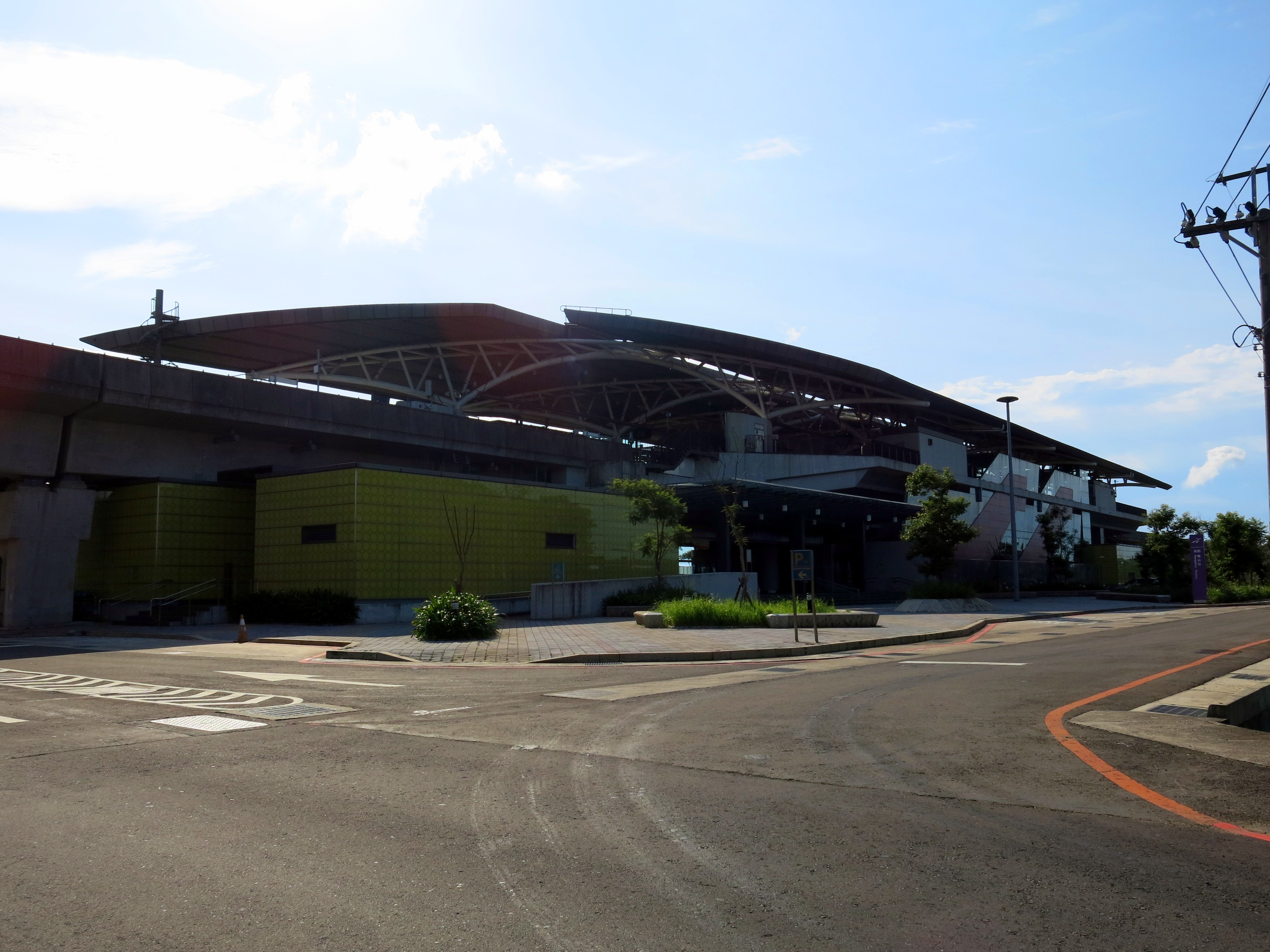

General information
- Location: 1180 Dazhu S Rd; Dayuan, Taoyuan City; Taiwan
- Coordinates: 25.0367°N 121.2157°E
- Operated by: Taoyuan Metro Corporation
- Line: Taoyuan Airport MRT

Construction
- Structure type: Elevated

Other information
- Station code: A16

History
- Opened: 2017-03-02

Passengers
- Aug 2025: 832 (entries and exits, daily)
- Rank: 21/22

Services
Preceding station	Taoyuan Metro	Following station
Dayuan towards Taipei Main Station	Taoyuan Airport MRT Commuter	Linghang towards Laojie River
Taoyuan Airport MRT does not stop here
Location

Hengshan (Chinese: 橫山) is a station on the Taoyuan Airport MRT located in Dayuan District, Taoyuan City, Taiwan. It opened for commercial service on 2 March 2017.

This elevated station has two side platforms and two tracks. Only commuter trains stop at this station. The station is 153.6 metres (504 ft) long and 26.4 metres (87 ft) wide. It opened for trial service on February 2, 2017, and for commercial service on March 2, 2017.

In 2032, the Green line of the Taoyuan Metro will be extended to this station (station code G18), providing a transfer with the Airport MRT.

Construction on the station began on September 18, 2008, and it opened for commercial service on March 2, 2017 with the opening of the Taipei-Huanbei section of the Airport MRT.

== Around the station ==
- Kaguo Ranch (卡果牧場) (1km northeast of the station)
- Haifeng Park (1km southwest of the station)
- Dayuan Da-Hai Park (2.4km northeast of the station)
- Taoyuan Calla Lily Festival (2.4km southwest of the station)
- Xihai Pond Ecology Park (2.8km southwest of the station)

== Exits ==
- Exit 1: Dazhu South Road

== See also ==
- Taoyuan Metro
