= Dayuan metro station =

Metro station in Taoyuan, Taiwan

Dayuan A15 大園
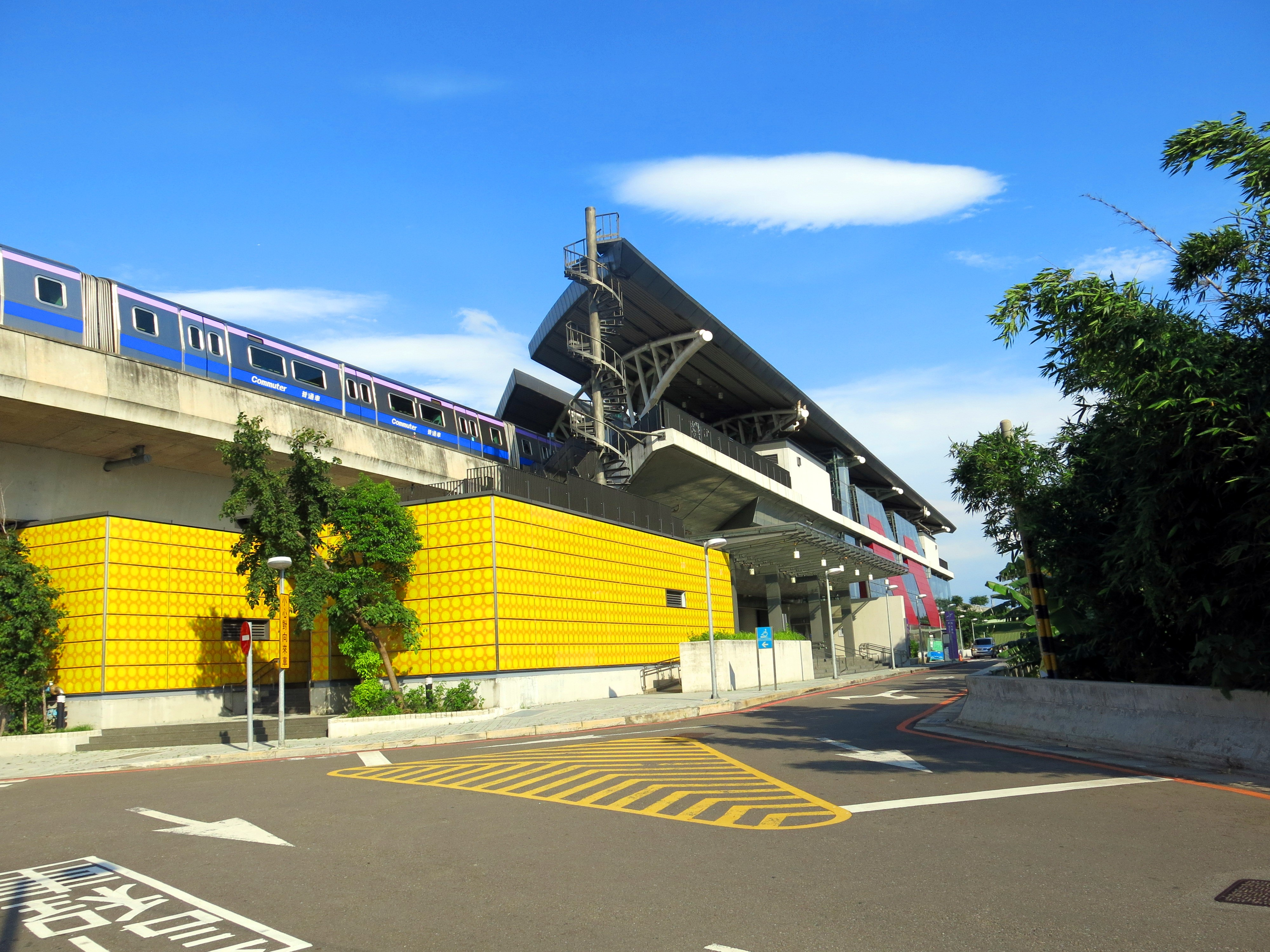

General information
- Location: 50 Hengnan 1st Rd; Dayuan, Taoyuan City; Taiwan
- Coordinates: 25°3′21.7″N 121°12′37.8″E
- Operated by: Taoyuan Metro Corporation
- Line: Taoyuan Airport MRT (A15)

Construction
- Structure type: Elevated

Other information
- Station code: A15

History
- Opened: 2017-03-02

Passengers
- Aug 2025: 4,690 (entries and exits, daily)
- Rank: 15/22

Services
Preceding station	Taoyuan Metro	Following station
Airport Hotel towards Taipei Main Station	Taoyuan Airport MRT Commuter	Hengshan towards Laojie River
Taoyuan Airport MRT does not stop here
Location

Dayuan (Chinese: 大園) is a station on the Taoyuan Airport MRT located in Dayuan District, Taoyuan City, Taiwan. It opened for commercial service on 2 March 2017.

This elevated station has two side platforms and two tracks. Only commuter trains stop at this station. The station is 170.0 metres (557.7 ft) long and 26.4 metres (87 ft) wide. It opened for trial service on 2 February 2017, and for commercial service on 2 March 2017.

== History ==
Construction on the station began on 18 September 2008. The station opened for commercial service on 2 March 2017 with the opening of the Taipei-Huanbei section of the Airport MRT.

== Around the station ==
- Hengfeng Riverside Park (850m north of the station)
- Dayuan Night Market (1.9km northwest of the station)
- Guojuyang Umbrella Cultural and Creative Park (國巨洋傘文創園區) (3.2km northwest of the station)
- Yangrong Leisure Farm (陽榮休閒農場) (3.4km southwest of the station)

== Exits ==
- Exit 1: Hengnan 1st Road

== See also ==
- Taoyuan Metro
