= Airport Terminal 1 metro station (Taiwan) =

Metro station in Taoyuan, Taiwan

Airport Terminal 1 A12 機場第一航廈
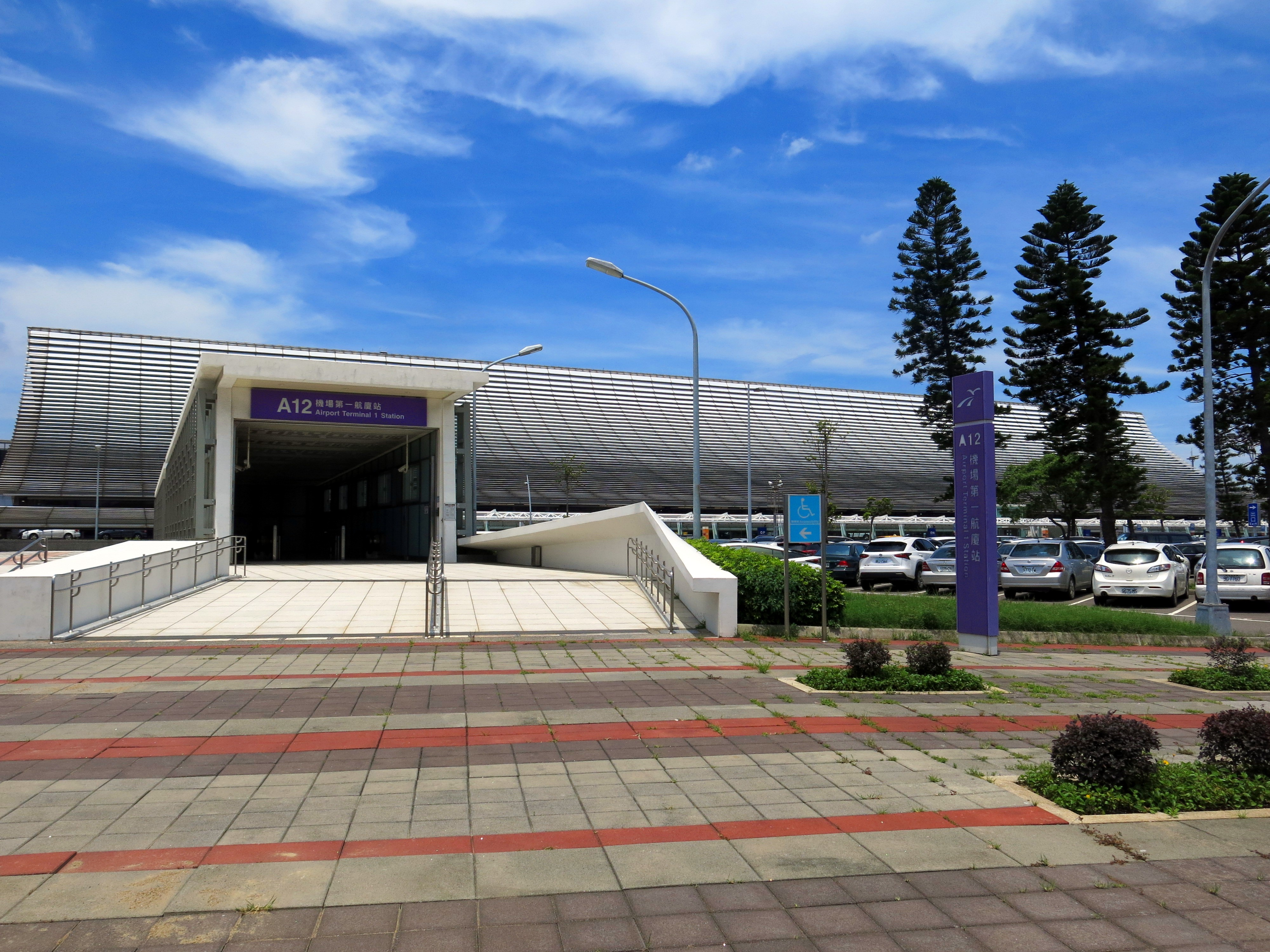

General information
- Location: 17-1 Hangzhan S Rd; Dayuan, Taoyuan City; Taiwan
- Coordinates: 25°04′49″N 121°14′17″E
- Operated by: Taoyuan Metro Corporation
- Line: Taoyuan Airport MRT (A12)

Construction
- Structure type: Underground

Other information
- Station code: A12

History
- Opened: 2017-03-02

Passengers
- Aug 2025: 24,372 (entries and exits, daily)
- Rank: 2/22

Services
Preceding station	Taoyuan Metro	Following station
Chang Gung Memorial Hospital towards Taipei Main Station	Taoyuan Airport MRT Express	Airport Terminal 2 Terminus
Chang Gung Memorial Hospital towards Taipei Main Station	Taoyuan Airport MRT Express	Airport Terminal 2 towards Huanbei
Kengkou towards Taipei Main Station	Taoyuan Airport MRT Commuter	Airport Terminal 2 towards Laojie River
Location

Airport Terminal 1 (Chinese: 機場第一航廈站) is a station on the Taoyuan Airport MRT located in Dayuan, Taoyuan City, Taiwan. The station is located under Terminal 1 of Taoyuan International Airport and opened for commercial service on 2 March 2017.

This underground station has one island platform and two tracks. Both Express and Commuter trains stop at this station. The station is 171.4 metres (562 ft) long and 17.3 metres (57 ft) wide. It opened for trial service on 2 February 2017, and for commercial service 2 March 2017.

Station construction was overseen by the Bureau of High Speed Rail (under the Ministry of Transportation and Communications).

== History ==
- 2017-03-02: The station opened for commercial service with the opening of the Taipei-Huanbei section of the Airport MRT.

== Gallery ==
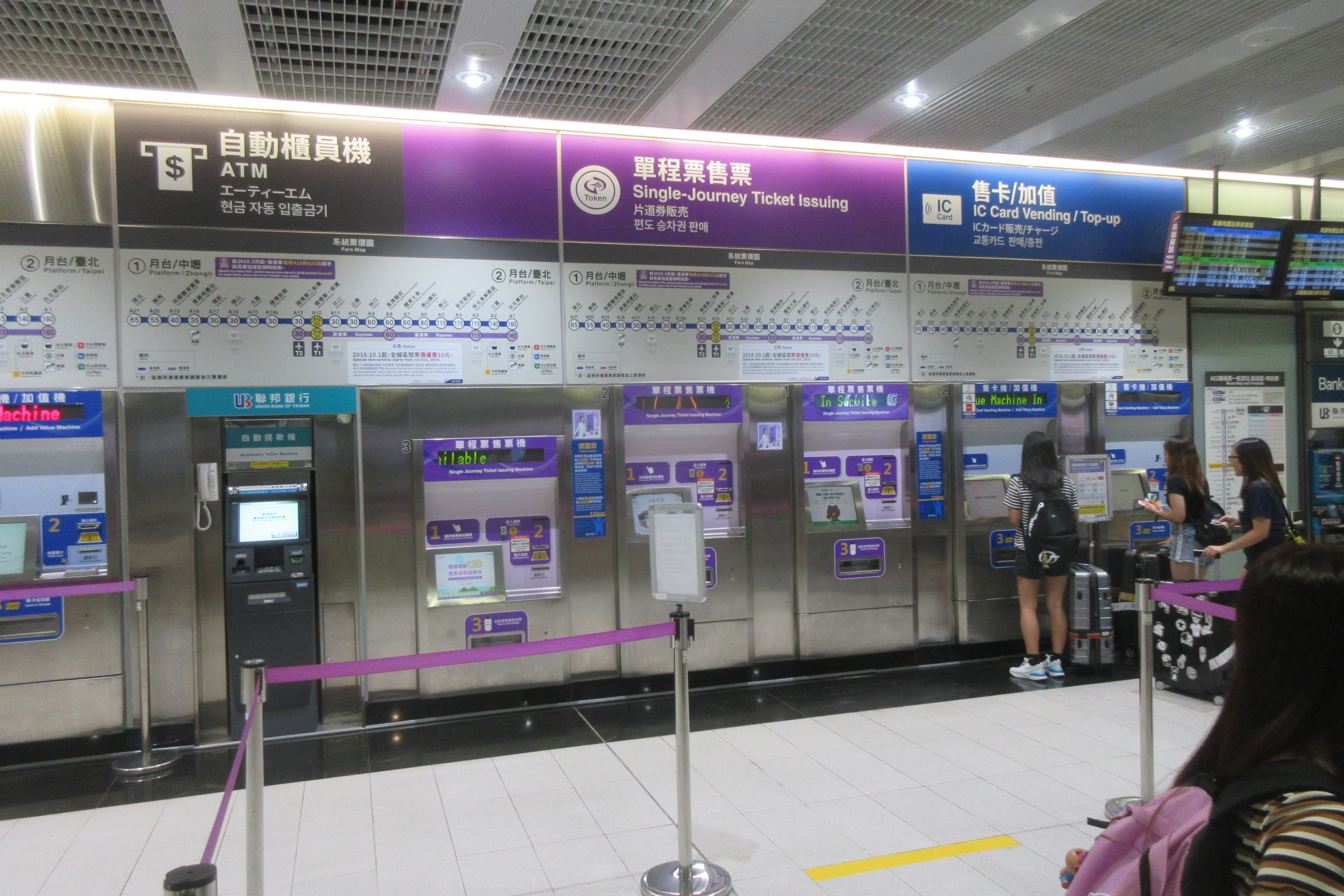
Taoyuan Airport Terminal 1 station ticket machines

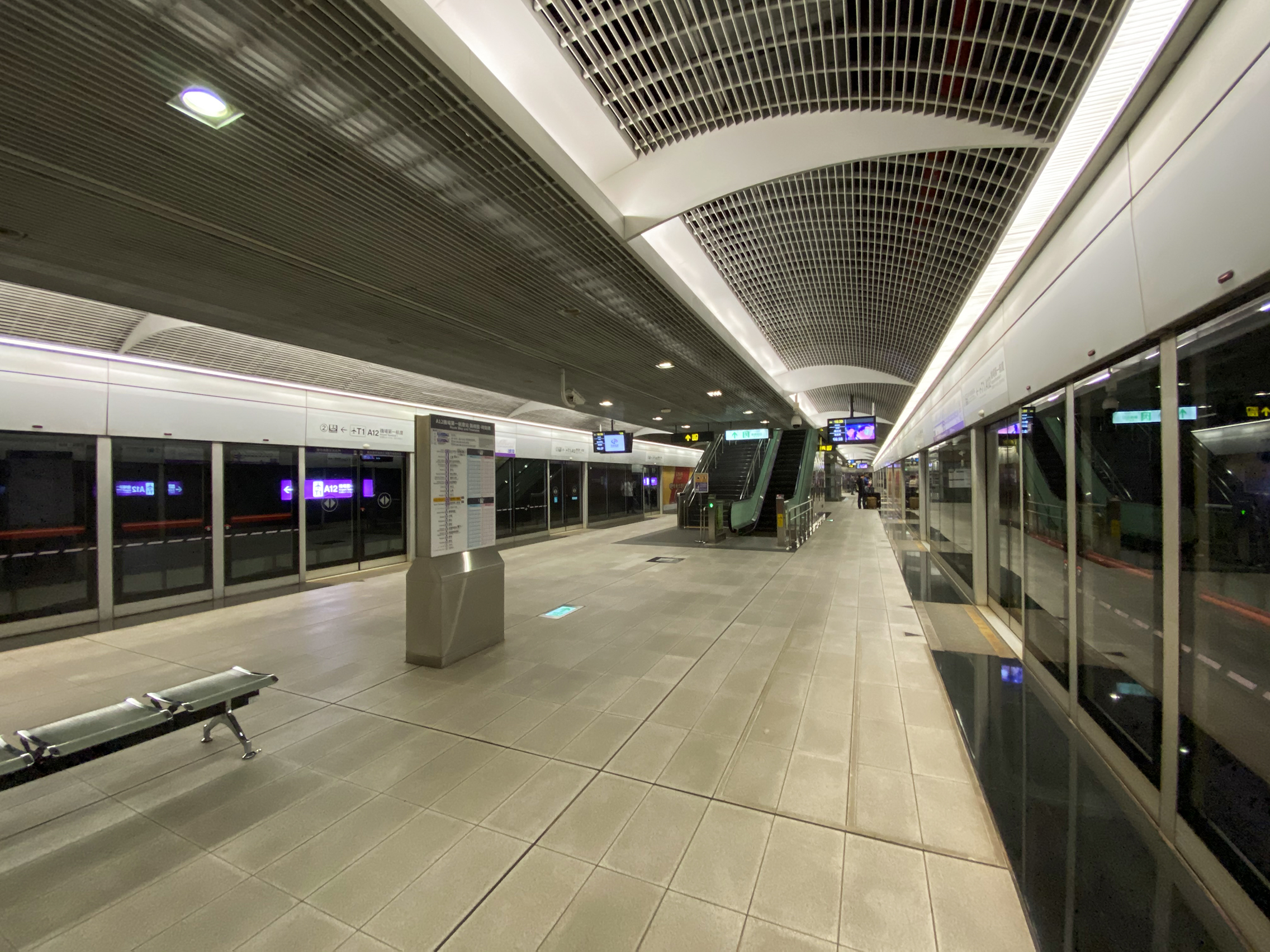
Airport Terminal 1 station platform

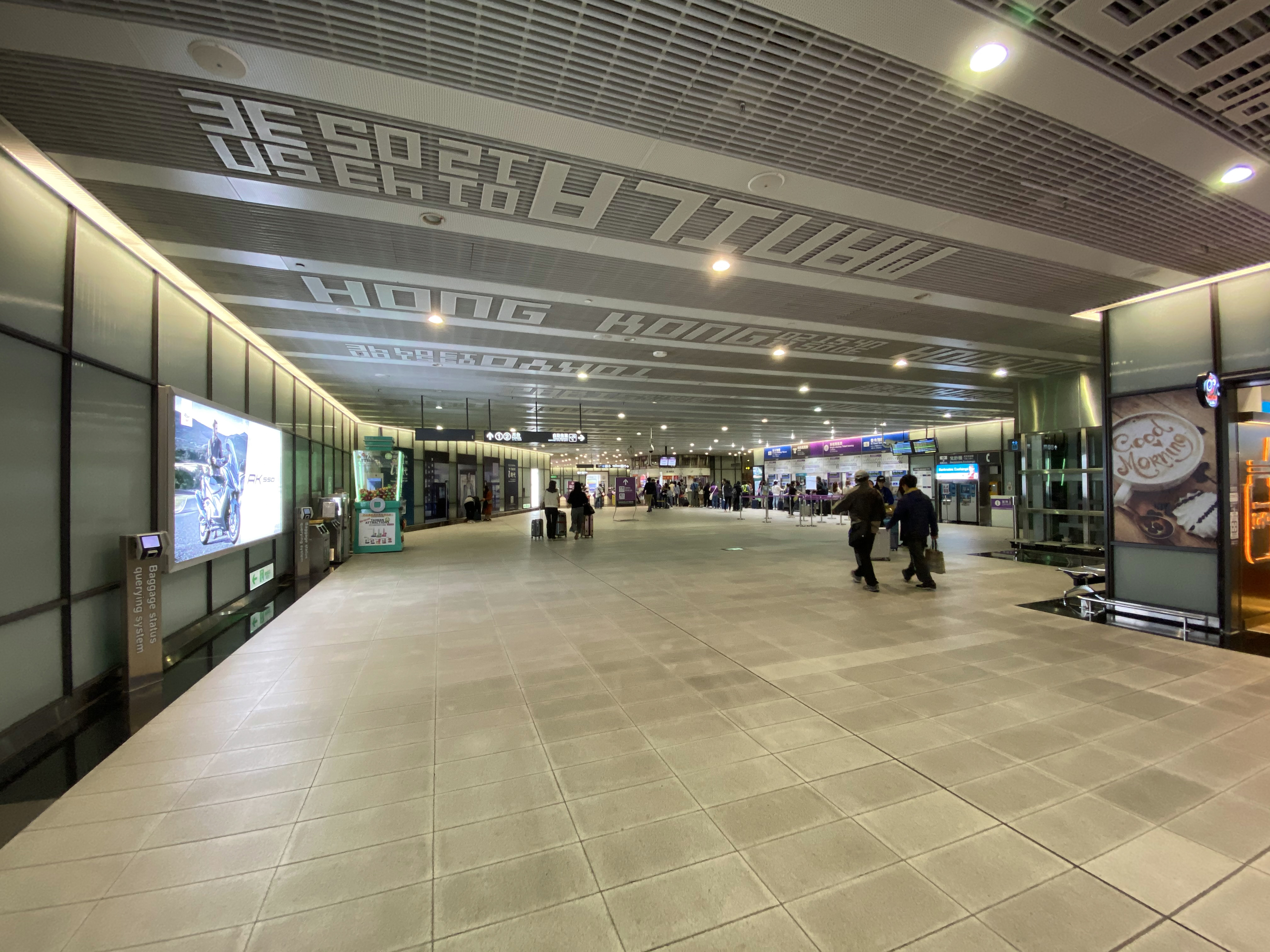
Airport Terminal 1 station concourse

== See also ==
- Taoyuan Metro
