= Kengkou metro station =

Metro station in Taoyuan City, Taiwan

Kengkou A11/G32 坑口
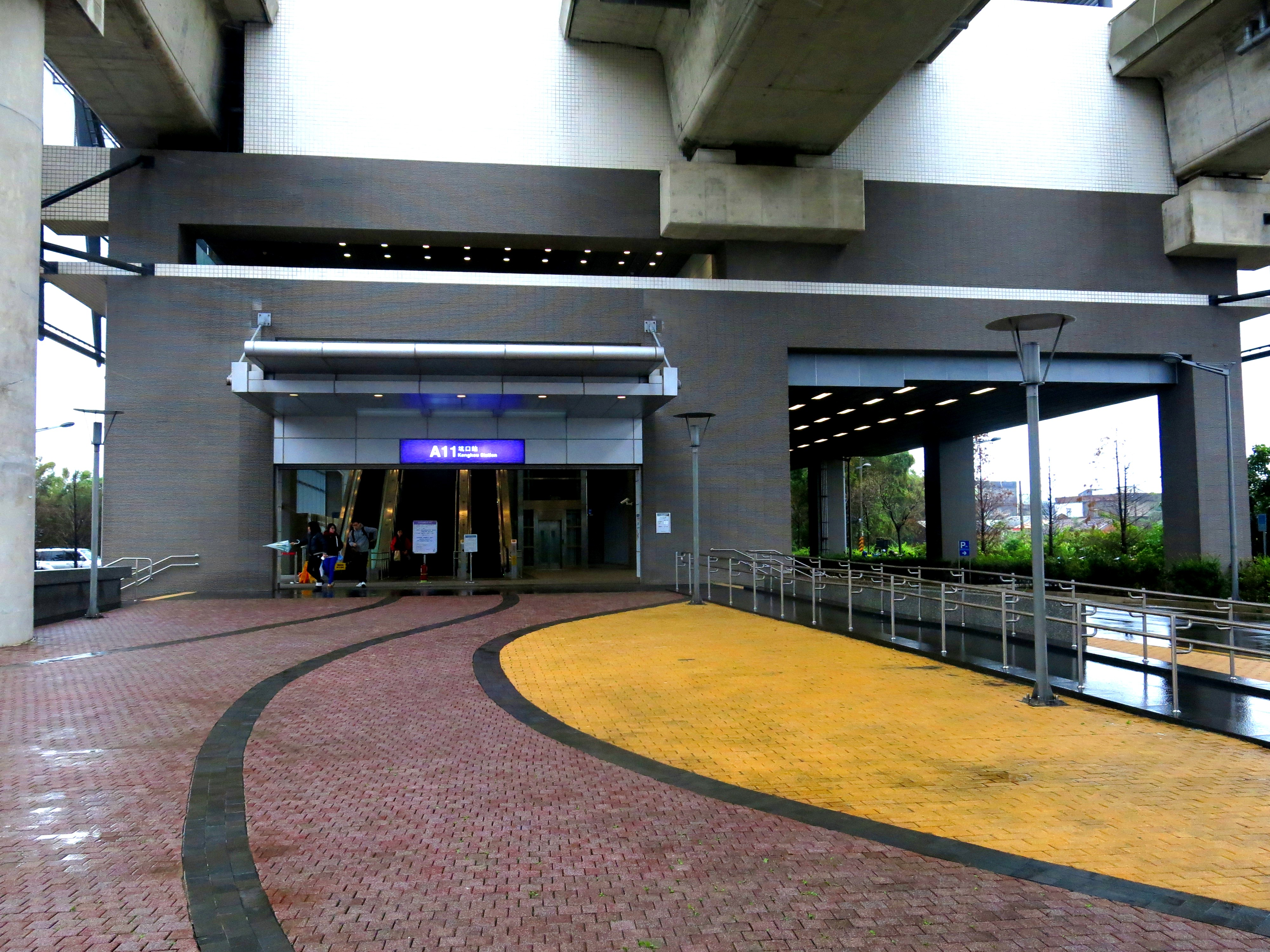
- Station entrance

General information
- Location: 460 Kengguo Rd; Luzhu, Taoyuan City; Taiwan
- Coordinates: 25°5′11.5″N 121°15′59.1″E
- Operator: Taoyuan Metro Corporation
- Line: Taoyuan Airport MRT (A11)

Construction
- Structure type: Elevated

Other information
- Station code: A11

History
- Opened: 2017-03-02

Passengers
- Aug 2025: 2,630 (entries and exits, daily)
- Rank: 18/22

Services
Preceding station	Taoyuan Metro	Following station
Shanbi towards Taipei Main Station	Taoyuan Airport MRT Commuter	Airport Terminal 1 towards Laojie River
Taoyuan Airport MRT does not stop here
Location

Kengkou (Chinese: 坑口站; pinyin: Kēngkǒu Zhàn) is a station on the Taoyuan Airport MRT located in Luzhu District, Taoyuan City, Taiwan. The station opened for commercial service on 2 March 2017.

== Station overview ==
This elevated station has two island platforms and four tracks, although Express trains do not currently stop at this station. The station is 108.0 metres (354.3 ft) long and 35.8 metres (117 ft) wide. It opened for trial service on 2 February 2017, and for commercial service on 2 March 2017.

In 2026, the Green line of the Taoyuan Metro will open, with an interchange to the Airport MRT provided at this station (code name G32).

=== History ===
- 2017-03-02: The station opened for commercial service with the opening of the Taipei-Huanbei section of the Airport MRT.

== Station overview ==
2F	Platform 1	Reserved for Luchu Depot (not in service)
2F	Island platform, doors open on the right
2F	Platform 2	← Airport MRT toward Laojie River (Airport Terminal 1)
2F	Platform 3	→ Airport MRT toward Taipei (Shanbi) →
2F	Island platform, doors open on the right
2F	Platform 4	Reserved for Luchu Depot (not in service)
Street level	Station lobby, connecting concourse	Entrance/exit, information counter Automatic ticket machines, faregates, restrooms

== Around the station ==
- Kengkou Painted Village (坑口彩繪村) (about 850 meters north of the station)

=== Exits ===
- Exit 1: Southwest of Kengguo Rd.

== See also ==
- Taoyuan Metro
