= Green line (Taoyuan Metro) =

Light metro line in northern Taiwan

Green Line

Overview
- Other name: Aerotropolis line (航空城線)
- Native name: 桃園捷運綠線
- Status: Under construction
- Owner: Taoyuan DORTS
- Locale: Taoyuan
- Termini: Jiande Xinfeng; Hengshan, Kengkou
- Stations: 29
- Color on map: Green

Service
- Type: Rapid transit
- System: Taoyuan Metro
- Operator: Taoyuan Metro Corporation
- Depots: North; South
- Rolling stock: Hyundai Rotem (2M)

History
- Planned opening: December 2026 (Phase 1A - Kengkou to Arts and Cultural Business District); 2028 (Phase 1B - Arts and Cultural Business District to Jingfu Temple); 2030 (Phase 2 - Jingfu Temple to Jiande Xingfeng); 2031 (Zhongli extension); 2032 (Aerotropolis branch to Hengshan)

Technical
- Line length: Main line: 27.8 km (17.3 mi); Zhongli extension: 7.2 km (4.5 mi); Daxi extension: 4.33 km (2.69 mi)
- Character: Elevated and underground
- Track gauge: 1,435 mm (4 ft 8 1/2 in) standard gauge
- Electrification: 750 V DC third rail

The Green line, also known as Aerotropolis line (Chinese: 航空城線), is a light metro line of the Taoyuan Metro that is under construction. It will join with the Taoyuan Airport MRT at Kengkou and Hengshan.

Construction on the Green line began in Bade District, Taoyuan on 15 October 2018. A groundbreaking ceremony was held on 11 October 2019, and the first phase of the line between Kengkou and Arts and Cultural Business District is projected to open in December 2026. This will then be followed by a 3-station extension to Jingfu Temple in 2028, before the full mainline opens to Jiande Xingfeng in 2030. The Zhongli and Hengshan branch lines will open in 2031 and 2032 respectively.

== Station list ==
Code (Note: Italic for constructing or planning stations)	Station name	Station type		Locale		Sta. distance (km)		Opened date	Transfer
Code	Station name	Structure	Platform	Locale		Previous	Total	Opened date	Transfer
Green line Main route (Jiande Xingfeng–Shuiwei–Hengshan)
G01	Jiande Xingfeng 建德興豐	Elevated	Island	Bade	Taoyuan	—N/a	0.000	Est. 2030	Zhongli extension line Daxi extension line
G02	Rende Park 仁德公園 (Note: Temporary name)	Elevated	Side	Bade	Taoyuan	1.501	1.501	Est. 2030	—N/a
G03	Chocolate 巧克力	Underground	Island	Bade	Taoyuan	1.282	2.783	Est. 2030	—N/a
G04	Danan 大湳	Underground	Island	Bade	Taoyuan	1.514	4.297	Est. 2030	Sanying line
G05	Xiaodanan 小大湳	Underground	Island	Bade	Taoyuan	1.387	5.684	Est. 2030	—N/a
G06	Yangming Sports Park 陽明運動公園	Underground	Island	Taoyuan	Taoyuan	1.452	7.136	Est. 2030	—N/a
G07	Taoyuan Railway Station 桃園車站	Underground	Split	Taoyuan	Taoyuan	1.448	8.584	Est. 2030	Brown line Western Trunk line
G08	Jingfu Temple 景福宮	Underground	Split	Taoyuan	Taoyuan	0.960	9.544	Est. 2028	—N/a
G09	Zhongzheng Lixing 中正力行	Underground	Split	Taoyuan	Taoyuan	0.865	10.409	Est. 2028	—N/a
G10	Zhongzheng Daxing 中正大興	Underground	Island	Taoyuan	Taoyuan	1.092	11.501	Est. 2028	Orange line
G11	Arts and Cultural Business District 藝文特區	Underground	Island	Taoyuan	Taoyuan	0.568	12.069	Est. 2026	—N/a
G12	Luxingpi 蘆興埤	Underground	Island	Taoyuan	Taoyuan	1.319	13.388	Est. 2026	—N/a
G13	Nanzhu Zhongzheng North 南竹中正北	Elevated	Side	Luzhu	Taoyuan	1.642	15.030	Est. 2026	—N/a
G14	Luzhu Zhongzheng North 蘆竹中正北	Elevated	Island	Luzhu	Taoyuan	1.349	16.379	Est. 2026	—N/a
G15	Shuiwei 水尾	Elevated	Island	Luzhu	Taoyuan	2.139	18.518	Est. 2026	For Kengkou
G16	Unreleased	Elevated	Side	Dayuan	Taoyuan	2.452	20.970	Est. 2032	—N/a
G17	Unreleased	Elevated	Side	Dayuan	Taoyuan	1.394	22.364	Est. 2032	—N/a
G18	Unreleased	Elevated	Side	Dayuan	Taoyuan	1.379	23.743	Est. 2032	—N/a
G19	Hengshan 橫山	Elevated	Island	Dayuan	Taoyuan	1.529	25.272	Est. 2032	Taoyuan Airport MRT
Green line Main route (Shuiwei–Kengkou)
G15	Shuiwei 水尾	Elevated	Island	Luzhu	Taoyuan	—N/a	0.000	Est. 2026	For Hengshan
G15a	Guolin 菓林	Elevated	Side	Dayuan	Taoyuan	1.873	1.873	Est. 2026	—N/a
G15b	Kengkou 坑口	Elevated	Island	Luzhu	Taoyuan	1.184	3.057	Est. 2026	Taoyuan Airport MRT
Green line Zhongli extension line (Jiande Xingfeng–Zhongli Railway Station)
G01	Jiande Xingfeng 建德興豐	Elevated	Island	Bade	Taoyuan	—N/a	0.000	Est. 2030	Green line Daxi extension line
G30	Unreleased	Elevated	Side	Bade	Taoyuan	1.106	1.106	Unreleased	—N/a
G29	Unreleased	Underground	Island	Zhongli	Taoyuan	1.470	2.576	Unreleased	—N/a
G28	Unreleased	Underground	Island	Zhongli	Taoyuan	1.030	3.606	Unreleased	—N/a
G27	Unreleased	Underground	Island	Zhongli	Taoyuan	0.980	4.586	Unreleased	—N/a
G26	Unreleased	Underground	Island	Zhongli	Taoyuan	1.171	5.757	Unreleased	—N/a
G25	Zhongli Railway Station 中壢車站	Underground	Island	Zhongli	Taoyuan	1.581	7.338	Unreleased	Taoyuan Airport MRT; Western Trunk line
Green line Daxi extension line (Jiande Xingfeng–Daxi)
G01	Jiande Xingfeng 建德興豐	Elevated	Island	Bade	Taoyuan	—N/a	0.000	Est. 2030	Green line Zhongli extension line
GA01	Unreleased	Elevated	Unreleased	Daxi	Taoyuan	Unreleased		Planning	—N/a
GA02	Unreleased	Elevated	Unreleased	Daxi	Taoyuan	Unreleased		Planning	—N/a
GA03	Unreleased	Elevated	Unreleased	Daxi	Taoyuan	Unreleased		Planning	—N/a

== Rolling stock ==
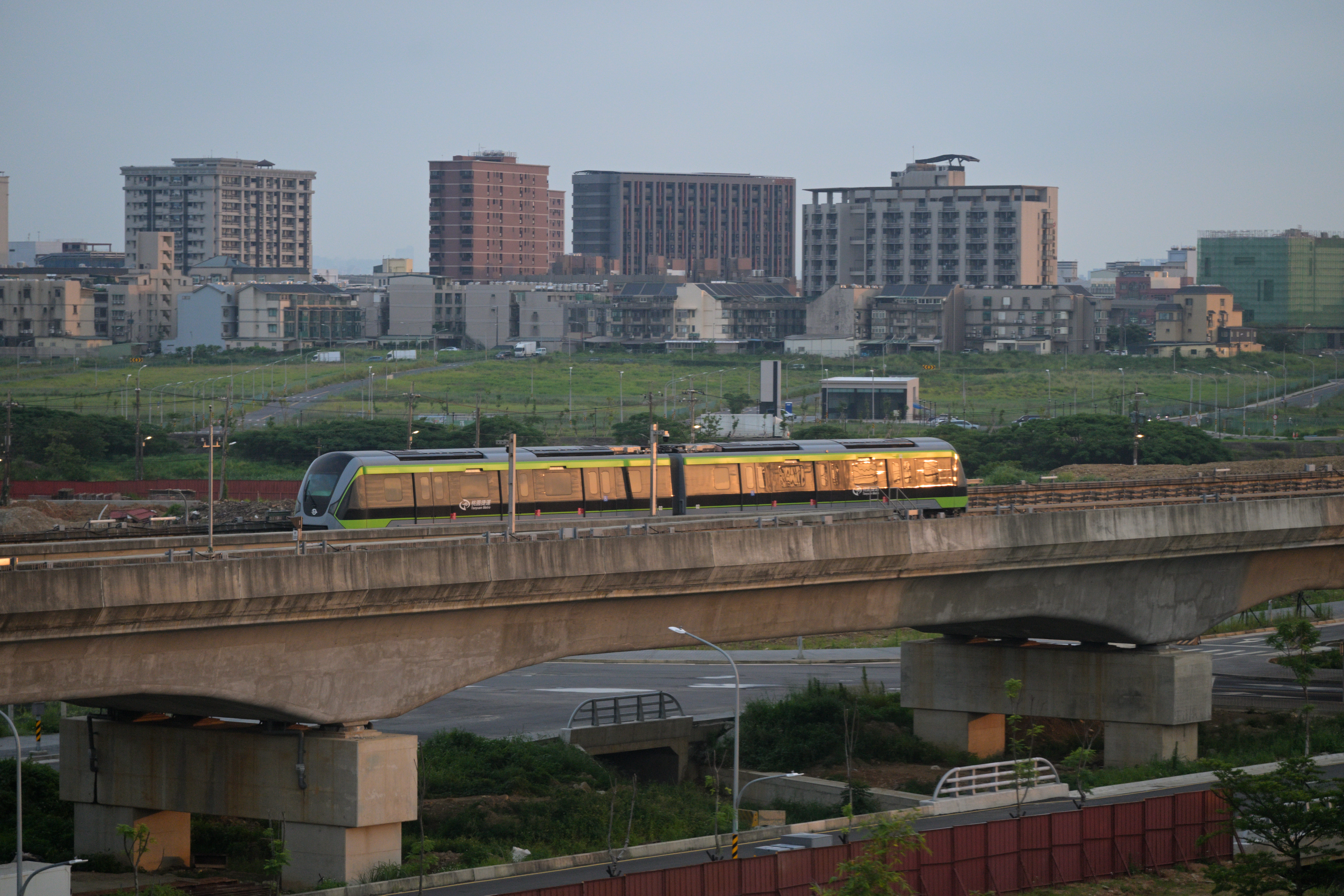
A Green line train testing on the rail

The green line uses 40 two-car fully automated EMUs manufactured by Hyundai Rotem with CBTC system provided by Siemens.
