= Taipei Twin Towers corruption scandal =

2013 Taiwan scandal

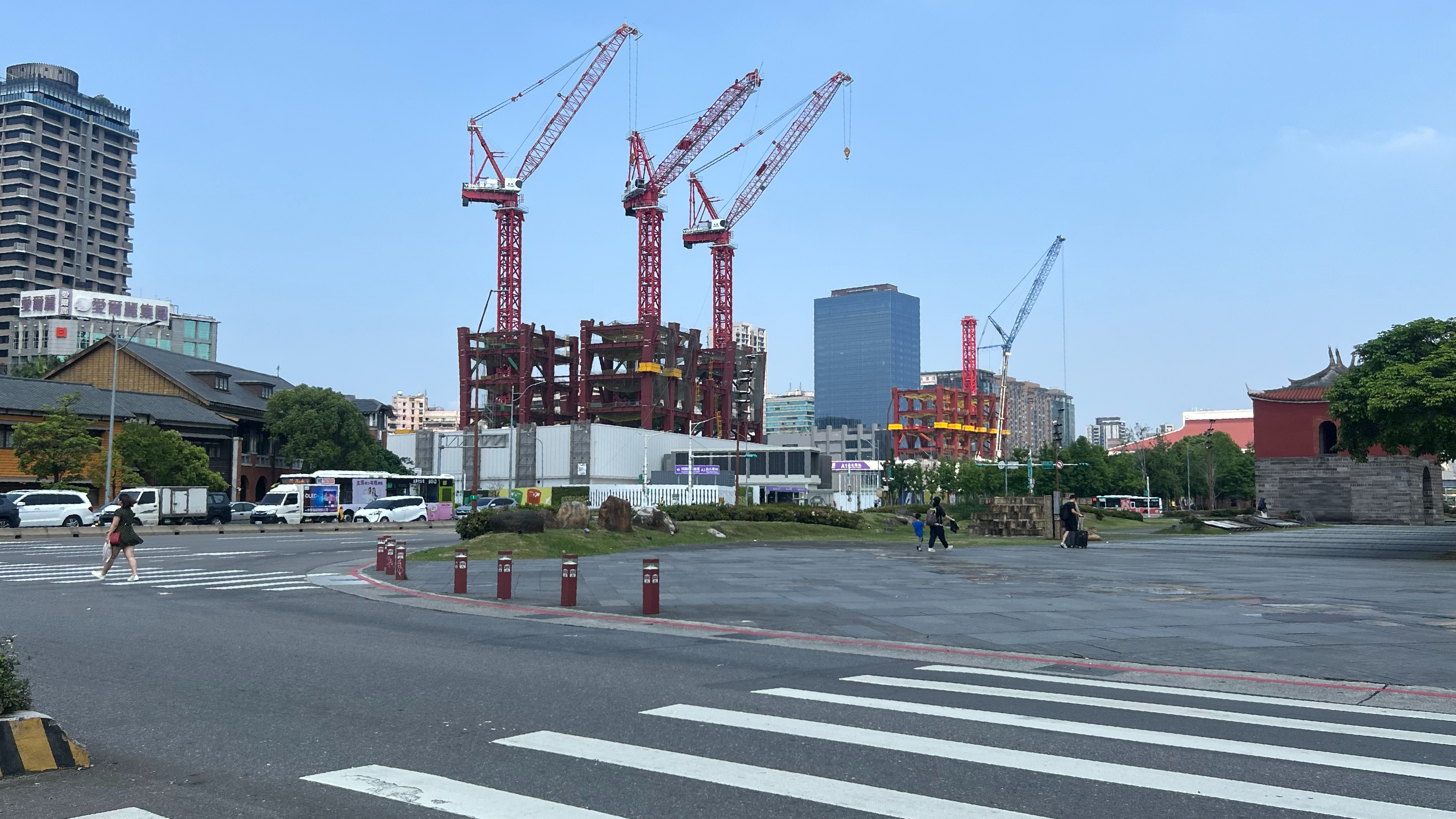
- A view of the Taipei Twin Towers (currently named Taipei Twin Star) construction site, seen from the intersection of Section 1, Zhonghua Road and Section 1, Zhongxiao West Road in Taipei City.
- Date: 2013–
- Location: Zhongxiao West Road, Zhongzheng District, Taipei, Taiwan
- Participants: Lai Su-ju, Cheng Hung-tao, Chia Er-ching, Chen Chuang-liang, Chiu Ta-chan, Peng Hung-ming, Peng Ya, and others
- Outcome: Several elected officials and government officials were indicted and convicted on corruption-related charges.; Resignations of implicated officials.

The Taipei Twin Towers corruption scandal was a corruption case involving the Taipei Twin Towers development project. In 2013, then KMT Taipei City councilor and director of President Ma Ying-jeou's office, Lai Su-ju, together with several other elected representatives and Taipei City Government officials, was accused of soliciting bribes related to the project. The Taipei District Prosecutors Office indicted them on corruption charges. Lai was ultimately sentenced to seven years and six months in prison, deprived of civil rights for four years, and ordered to forfeit NT$1 million in illicit gains.

Following the scandal, then Taipei Mayor Hau Lung-pin decided to cancel the tender for the Taipei Twin Towers project and planned to have the Department of Rapid Transit Systems undertake the construction itself. Subsequently, Mayor Ko Wen-je reopened the bidding process while continuing to investigate the case. The project was eventually awarded to a consortium led by CLEVO Co. and the HongWell Group, with construction beginning in 2022 and completion expected in 2027 at the earliest.

== Overview ==
The Taipei Twin Towers project, associated with the Taoyuan Airport MRT, was one of the major infrastructure projects initiated during the administration of Hau Lung-pin, Mayor of Taipei, and ranked first among his "Top Ten Construction Projects".Together with the redevelopment of Taipei Songshan Airport, it was referred to as Taipei's "Twin Gateways".

After five failed tenders, the project was awarded to Tai Chi Twin Star Corporation on 28 October 2012. On the day the bid security deposit was due, the Taipei City Government unusually extended the deadline from 5 p.m. to midnight. Officials announced that they had received a faxed remittance slip from Tai Chi Twin Star, but it was later discovered that the payment was unfunded. The incident raised doubts about the company's qualifications and prompted allegations that officials and members of the selection committee had favored the bidder.

In mid-February 2013, Chen Chuang-liang, Director of the Department of Rapid Transit Systems resigned over the controversy, and his resignation was approved by Hau Lung-pin.

In March, Taipei City councilor Chung Hsiao-ping reported Finance Bureau Director Chiu Ta-chan and Chen to the Taipei District Prosecutors Office, alleging that they had improperly benefited contractors involved in the project. Prosecutors subsequently searched the Taipei City Government Finance Bureau, Lai Su-ju's law office, and her city council office. The Taipei District Court ordered Lai Su-ju and Cheng Hung-tao detained.

In April, the Taipei City Investigation Division of the Ministry of Justice Investigation Bureau questioned former Rapid Transit Systems Department Director Chen Chuang-liang as a criminal suspect. Media reports later revealed that Tai Chi Twin Star was effectively a shell company that had falsely claimed investment from Malaysia's Ipoh Garden Berhad and Japan's Mori Group (unrelated to Mori Building Company). A number of former and current Taipei officials were subsequently implicated in the case.

On 25 July 2013, the Taipei District Prosecutors Office determined that Lai Su-ju had accepted NT$1 million in bribes and indicted her and three others on corruption charges. In October 2014, the Taipei District Court sentenced Lai to ten years' imprisonment for bribery. On 31 August 2016, the Taiwan High Court reduced the sentence to nine years and revoked her civil rights for nine years. In January 2018, the Supreme Court overturned the second-instance ruling and remanded the case for retrial.

In April 2020, the Taiwan High Court, in its retrial, sentenced Lai to seven years and six months in prison, deprived her of civil rights for four years, and ordered the confiscation of NT$1 million in illegal gains, subject to appeal. In December 2020, the Supreme Court dismissed the appeal, making the judgment final.

== Details ==
On 27 March 2013, prosecutors alleged that Lai Su-ju had demanded NT$15 million in bribes from a bidder involved in the Taipei Twin Towers project, claiming that NT$5 million of the amount was intended to bribe fellow KMT councilors. She was alleged to have already received NT$1 million, prompting prosecutors to seek her detention.

Unaware that the Ministry of Justice Investigation Bureau had been wiretapping her for an extended period and had employed paparazzi-style surveillance to photograph her meetings with contractors, Lai initially denied all allegations. After prosecutors presented evidence, she claimed that she had returned the NT$1 million. Legal experts, however, argued that once an agreement to accept money in exchange for official action had been reached, the crime of agreeing to accept a bribe under the Anti-Corruption Act had already been completed, regardless of whether the money was later returned, and that the offense carried a minimum sentence of seven years' imprisonment.

On 28 March, Lai, through her lawyer, announced that she was resigning from all party positions.

On 29 March, the Taipei District Court granted Lai bail of NT$1.2 million and restricted her residence. On the same day, President and KMT chairman Ma Ying-jeou, after attending a ceremony commemorating revolutionary martyrs, stated that he was shocked by the allegations against Lai and that the KMT needed to undertake serious self-reflection and reforms. He also issued a statement expressing his shock and regret and apologized to party members and the public.

Later that evening, the Taiwan High Court overturned the bail ruling and remanded the case to the Taipei District Court.

At 10:00 a.m. on 30 March, the Taipei District Court convened another detention hearing.At 6:00 p.m., the court ordered Lai Su-ju detained incommunicado and transferred her to the Tucheng Women's Detention Center, where she was assigned inmate number 0224.

On 1 April, the KMT suspended Lai's party membership.

On 2 April, the Taiwan High Court rejected Lai's appeal against her detention.

On 4 April, investigators discovered through wiretaps that Cheng Hung-tao, a principal investor in Tai Chi Twin Star, and his business partner Chia Er-ching had referred to Lai Su-ju by the codename "Little Flower" while discussing bribery. Each "flower" represented NT$1 million, and intercepted conversations revealed that "the eldest lady" (referring to Lai) had demanded "ten flowers".

On 25 July, prosecutors concluded their investigation and determined that Lai had accepted NT$1 million in bribes. She was indicted on charges of accepting bribes in connection with official duties, concealing proceeds of corruption, and possessing unexplained assets. Prosecutors sought a heavy sentence. Lai maintained that the money was a lawful political donation and pleaded not guilty.

On 26 July, the case was transferred to the Taipei District Court. Following a random assignment to a judicial panel, a detention hearing was held immediately. At 7:15 p.m., the panel ruled that the charge of accepting bribes in connection with official duties under Article 5, Paragraph 1, Subparagraph 3 of the Anti-Corruption Act carried a minimum sentence of five years' imprisonment. Given discrepancies between Lai's statements and those of co-defendant Peng-ming and witness Peng-ya, the court found reason to believe she might collude with witnesses. Accordingly, it ordered her detention and prohibited visits and communications pursuant to Article 101, Paragraph 1, Subparagraphs 2 and 3 of the Code of Criminal Procedure.

On 23 August, the Taipei District Court granted Lai bail of NT$15 million and imposed restrictions on her residence, overseas travel, and sea travel.

On 31 October 2014, the Taipei District Court handed down its first-instance verdict. Finding that Lai Su-ju had solicited NT$15 million in bribes, accepted an advance payment of NT$1 million, and used her authority as a Taipei City Council councilor to shield the Tai Chi Twin Star consortium and eliminate competitors, the court sentenced her to ten years' imprisonment and deprivation of civil rights (disfranchisement) for five years. Former Taipei Finance Bureau Director Chiu Ta-chan, who had been indicted in the same case, was acquitted.

On 18 February 2016, the Taiwan High Court upheld Chiu Ta-chan's acquittal, making it final.

On 31 August 2016, the Taiwan High Court sentenced Lai to nine years in prison and deprived her of civil rights for nine years for accepting bribes in connection with official duties.

In January 2018, the Supreme Court overturned the second-instance ruling and remanded the case for retrial.

In April 2020, the Taiwan High Court, in its retrial, sentenced Lai to seven years and six months in prison, deprived her of civil rights for four years, and ordered the confiscation of NT$1 million in illicit gains. In December 2020, the Supreme Court dismissed the appeal, making the verdict final.

== Impact ==
As a result of the case, Lai Su-ju was handcuffed and transported by prison vehicle to the Tucheng Women's Detention Center, where she was assigned inmate number 0224. Cheng Hung-tao was also detained.

Meanwhile, Chen Chuang-liang and Chiu Ta-chan stepped down from their posts. Chiu was indicted for breach of trust and later became chairman of EasyCard Corporation. He was acquitted in 2016.

The Taipei Twin Towers scandal was regarded as a blow to the clean-government image promoted by the Presidency of Ma Ying-jeou, following the Lin Yi-shih bribery scandal. At the time, internet users circulated satirical images mocking the KMT government with the phrase, "Su-ju in the north, Chao-ching in the center, Yi-shih in the south, Po-yuan in the west, and Li-chen in the east".[1].

In 2020, journalist Chen Chia-hung recalled both the Lin Yi-shih and Lai Su-ju scandals as marking the beginning of the Ma administration's loss of public support, comparing them to the Kaohsiung MRT foreign workers scandal during the Chen Shui-bian administration.

During the investigation, Lai's defense attorneys were denied access to case files and subsequently petitioned for a constitutional interpretation. In 2016, the Constitutional Court issued Interpretation No. 737, ruling that denying defense counsel access to investigation files was unconstitutional. In 2017, the Legislative Yuan amended the Code of Criminal Procedure to allow defendants and their attorneys to review investigation files unless otherwise restricted by the courts. Because the amendment originated from Lai's constitutional petition, it became colloquially known as the "Lai Su-ju Clause".
