= Taipei Twins =

Skyscrapers in Taipei, Taiwan

Coordinates: 25.0487°N 121.5127°E

- 台北雙星
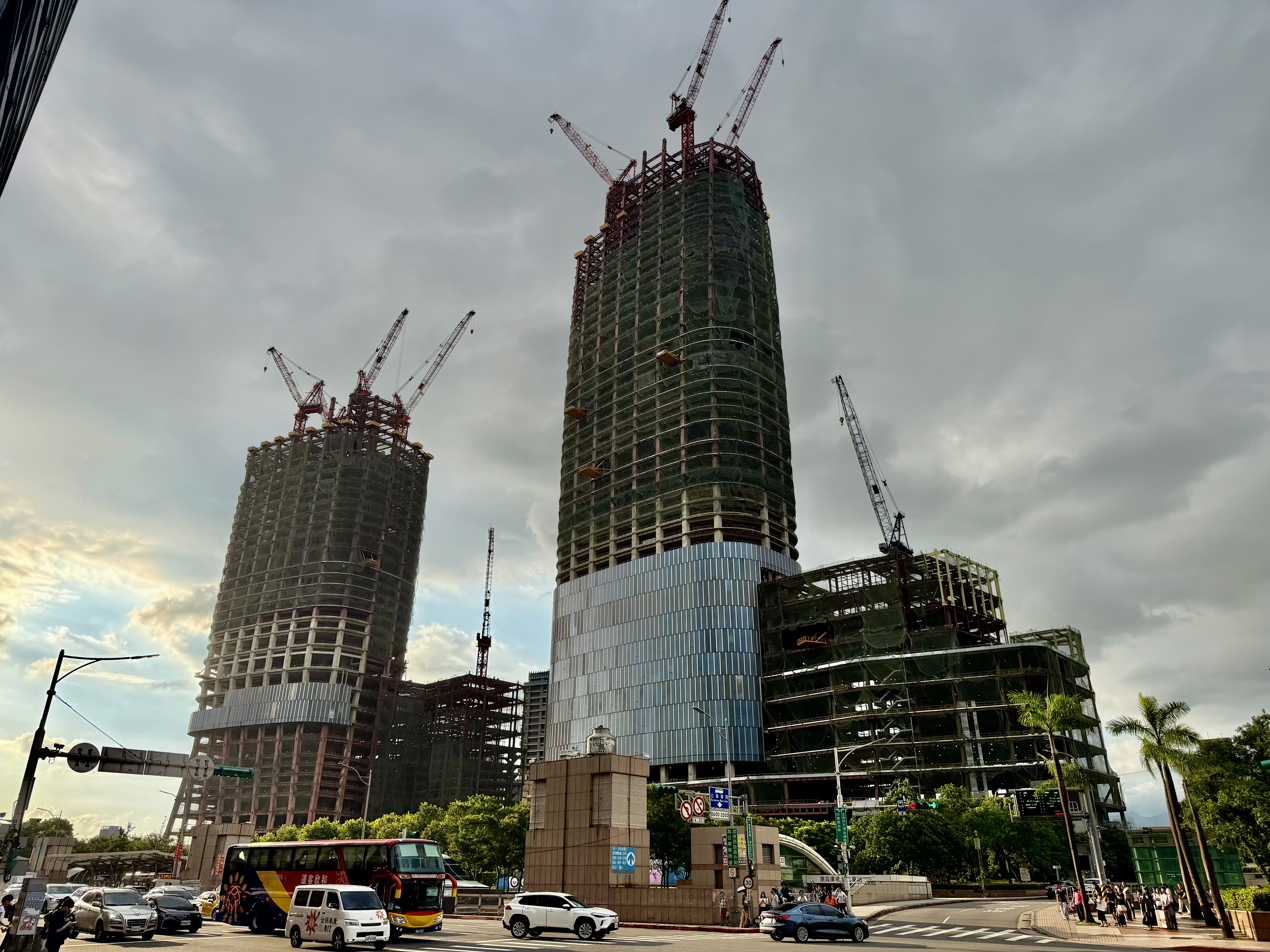
- Taipei Twins under construction
- Alternative names: Táiběi Shuāngxīng

General information
- Status: Under construction
- Location: Taipei, Taiwan
- Construction started: November 11, 2022
- Completed: 2028; 2 years' time

Height
- Height: 360 metres (1,181 ft); 280 metres (919 ft)

Technical details
- Floor count: 70 and 53
- Grounds: 434,000 square metres (4,670,000 sq ft)

Design and construction
- Architect: Skidmore, Owings & Merrill LLP

The Taipei Twins (Chinese: 台北雙星; pinyin: Táiběi Shuāngxīng) is a supertall skyscraper development in Taipei, Taiwan. Scheduled to be completed in 2028, it will include two skyscrapers, the taller of which is 360 metres (1,181 ft 1 in) with 70 floors and the shorter of which is 280 metres (918 ft 8 in) with 53 floors. It is located near Taipei Station, Shin Kong Life Tower, and Taipei Bus Station. When the complex is complete, the taller tower will be the second tallest building in Taiwan, surpassing the 347.5 metres (1,140 ft 1 in) 85 Sky Tower in Kaohsiung, which was completed in 1997. It is estimated to cost NT$60.6 billion (US$1.95 billion).

== History ==
The project was originally designed by Japanese architect Fumihiko Maki for the initial 2005 bid that planned to finish constructing the skyscrapers by 2011. However, it was delayed multiple times due to a series of complications in the bidding process, including the Taipei Twin Towers corruption scandal. The efforts were restarted in 2018 again for the sixth time.

In the latest round of bids, two proposals were submitted. In December 2018 the bid submitted by a consortium led by Hong Kong–based Nan Hai Development Ltd and Malaysian property developer Malton Berhad was named the most favored bidder. The skyscrapers were designed by MVRDV in collaboration with CHY Architecture Urban Landscape to revitalise the central station area in the capital's Zhongzheng District and was to be constructed as a pile of blocks, each fronted by screens that will display "major cultural spectacles, sporting events, and advertising", establishing the area as "a Times Square for Taiwan".

In June 2019, the most favored bidder status was revoked by Taiwan's Investment Commission under the Ministry of Economic Affairs due to national security concerns because it found Nan Hai to be Chinese-funded and the majority of its board members hailing from China. The bid was subsequently awarded in December 2019 to the runner-up, a consortium led by Taiwanese computer maker Clevo and its property development affiliate Hongwell Group with designs by American architectural firm Skidmore, Owings & Merrill LLP. The basement of building C1 is the terminus for the Taoyuan Airport MRT.

The construction of the towers officially began on November 11, 2022, with the ground breaking ceremony attended by the Taipei mayor Ko Wen-je.

== Gallery ==
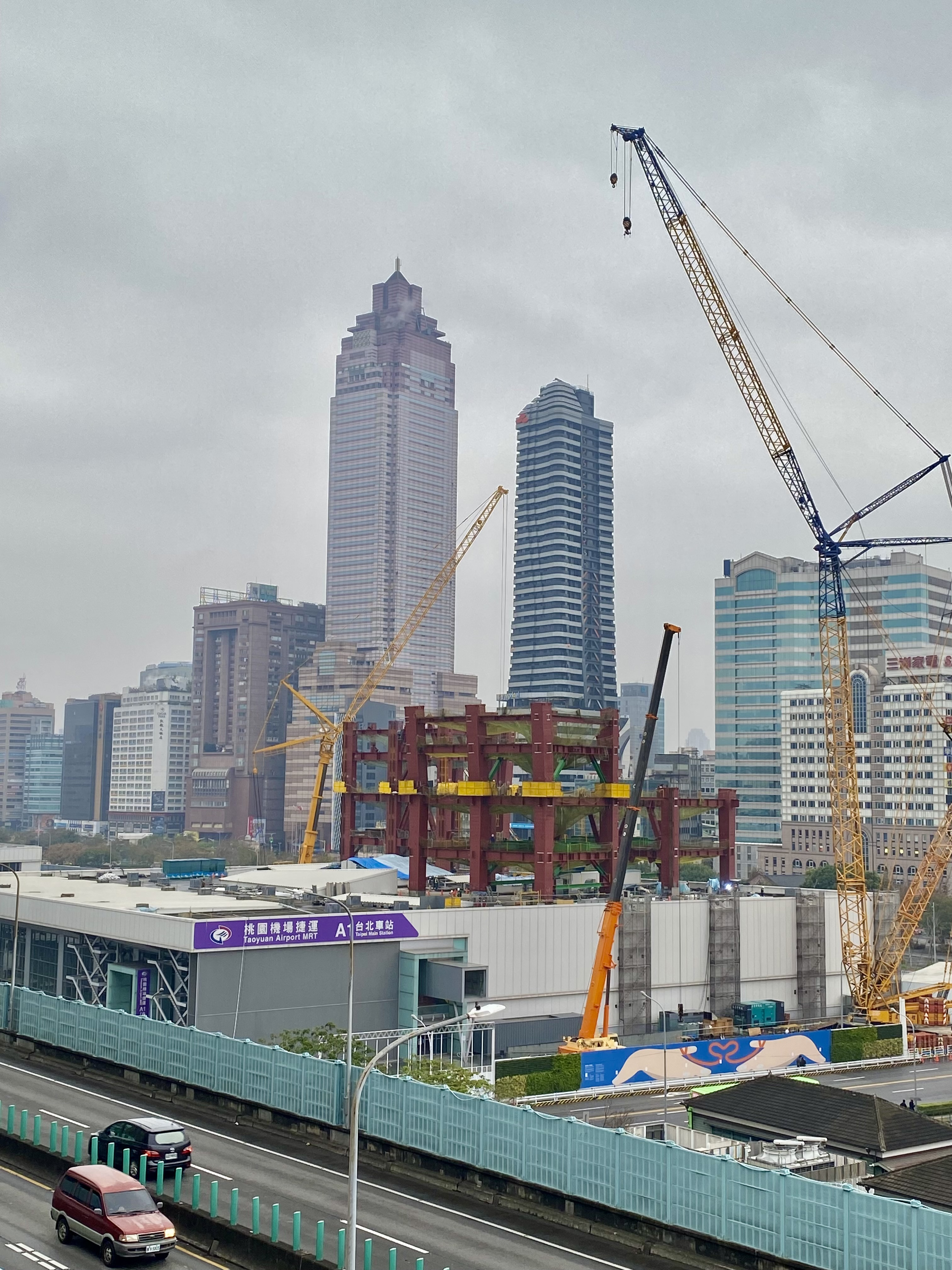
Construction progress February 2024

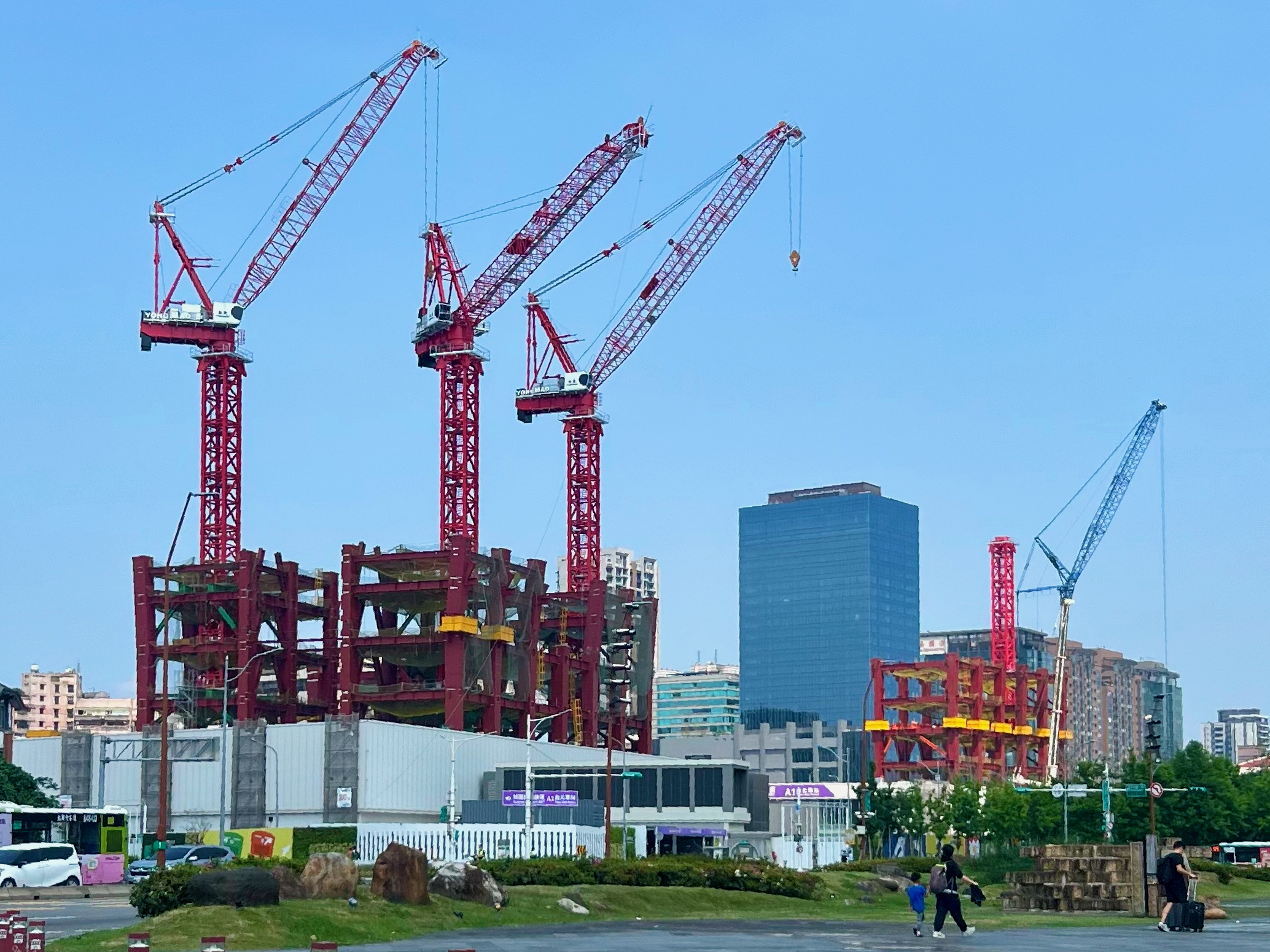
Construction progress April 2024

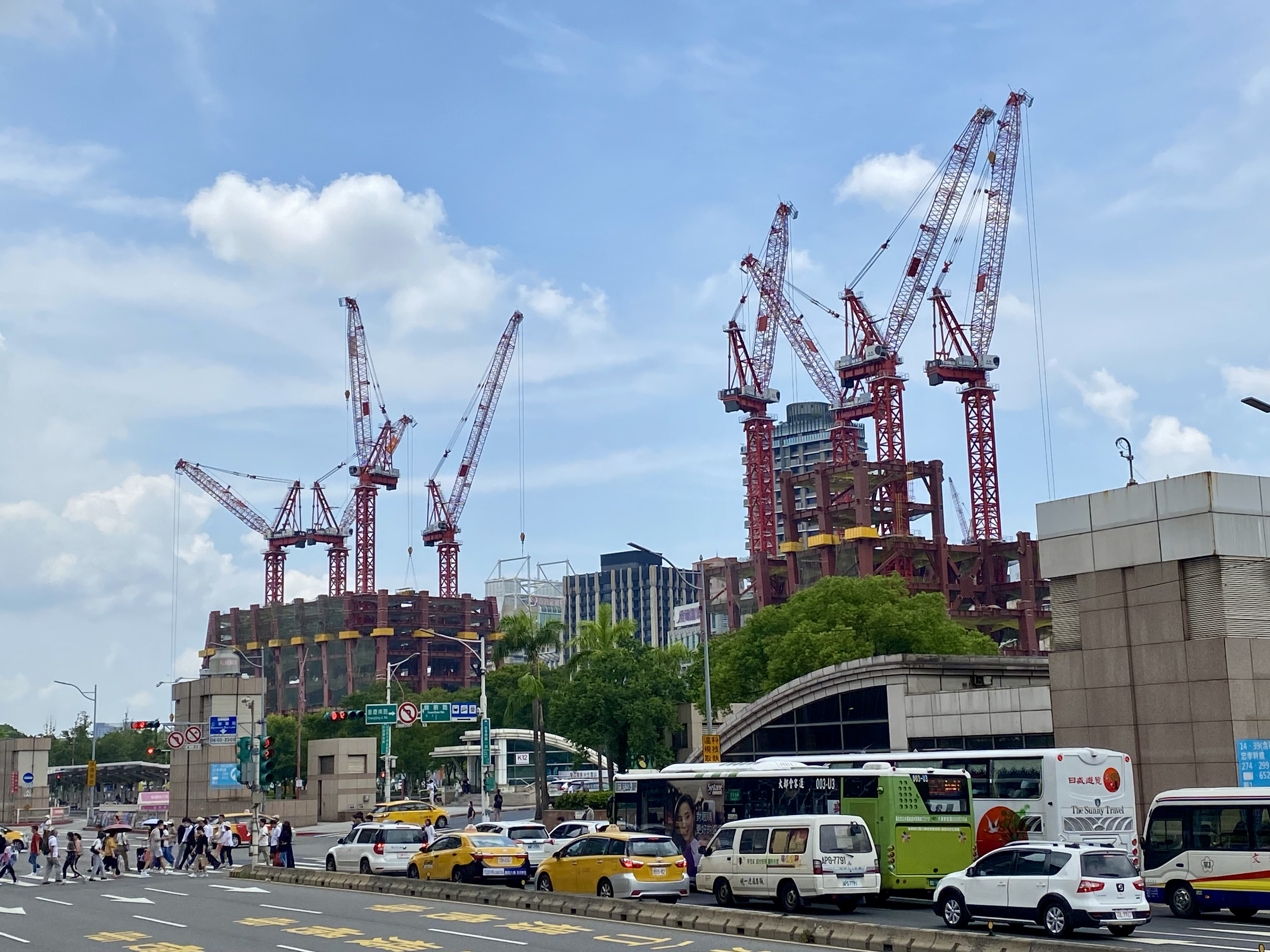
Construction progress August 2024

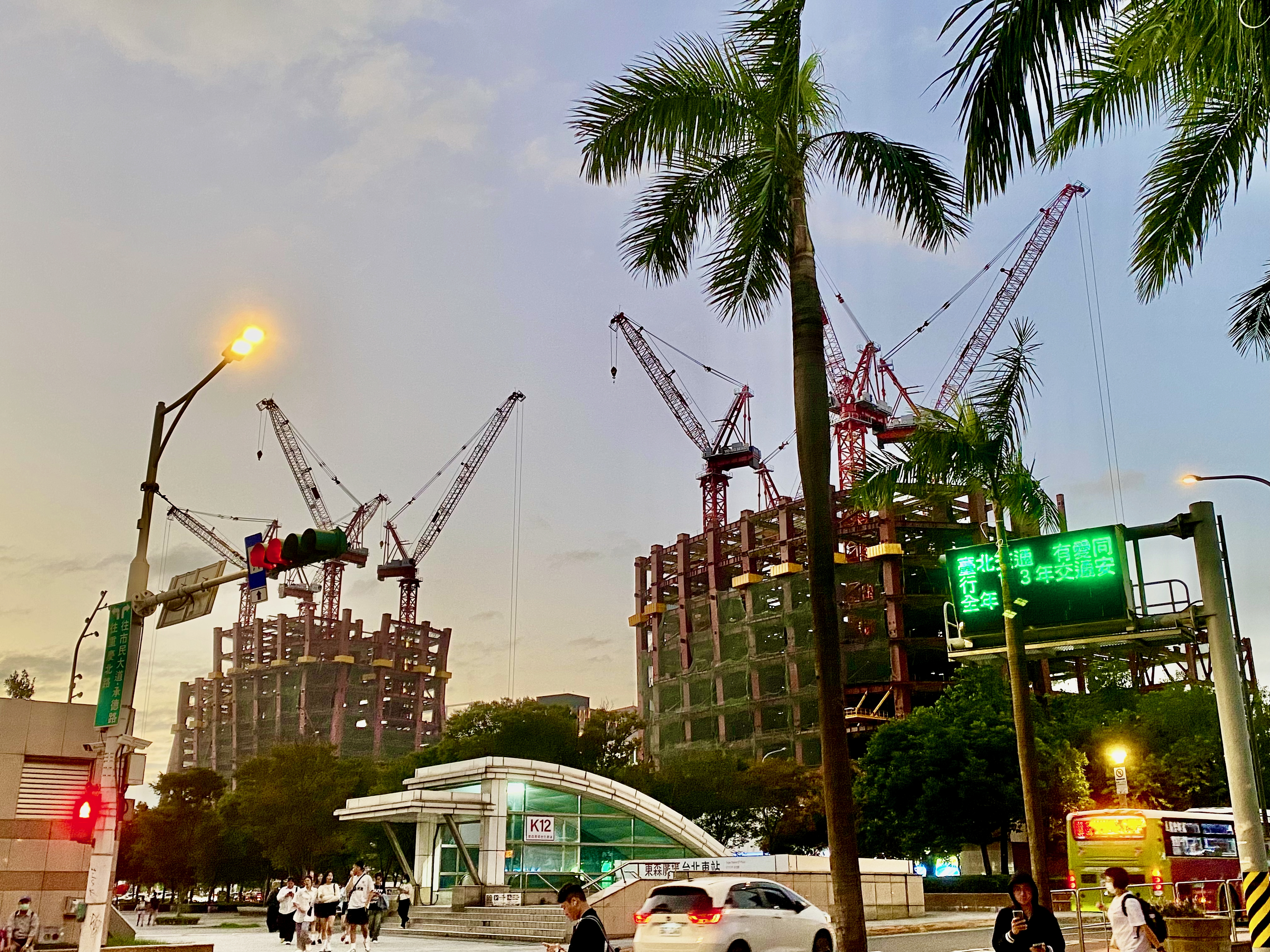
Construction progress November 2024

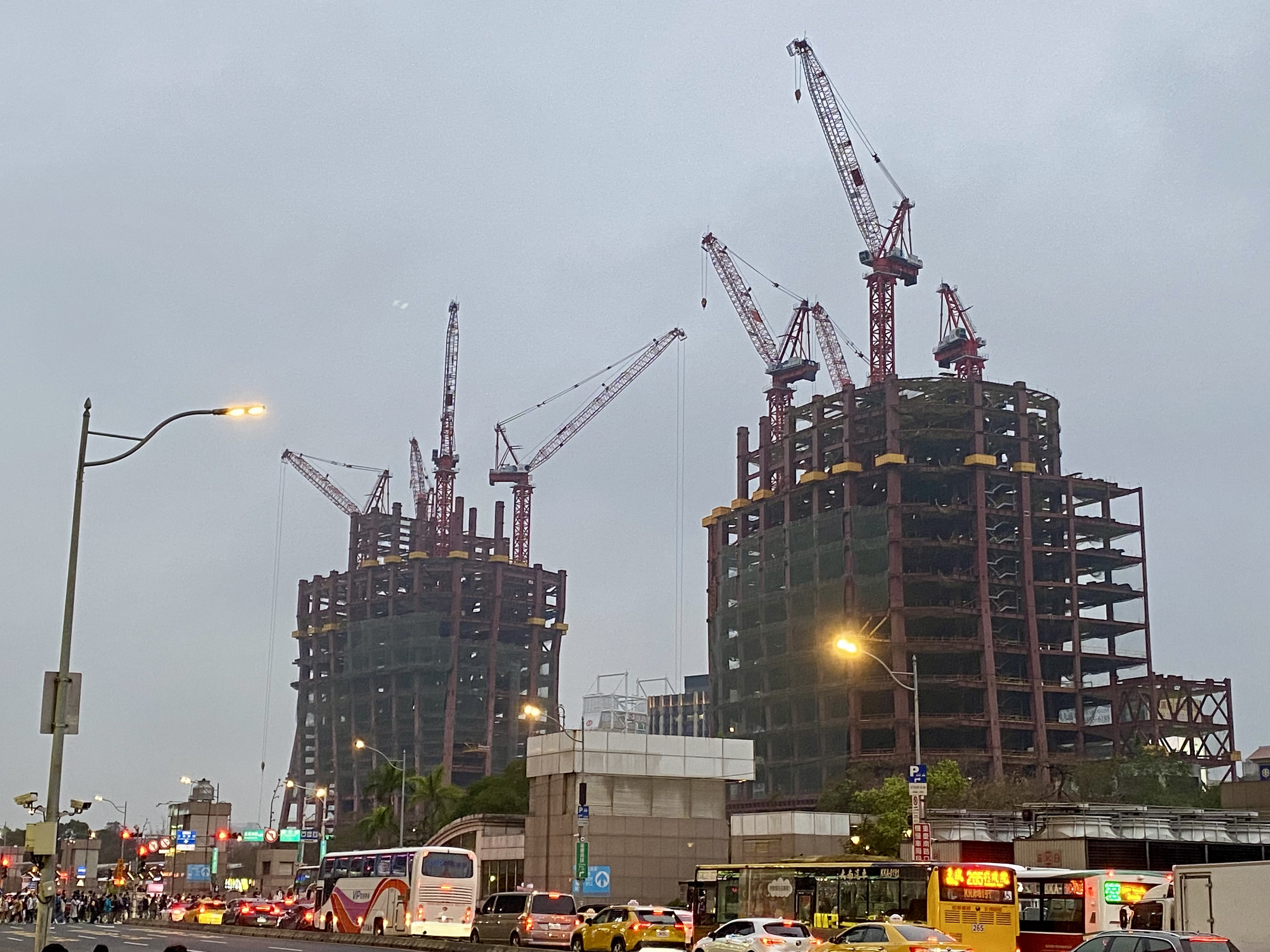
Construction progress February 2025

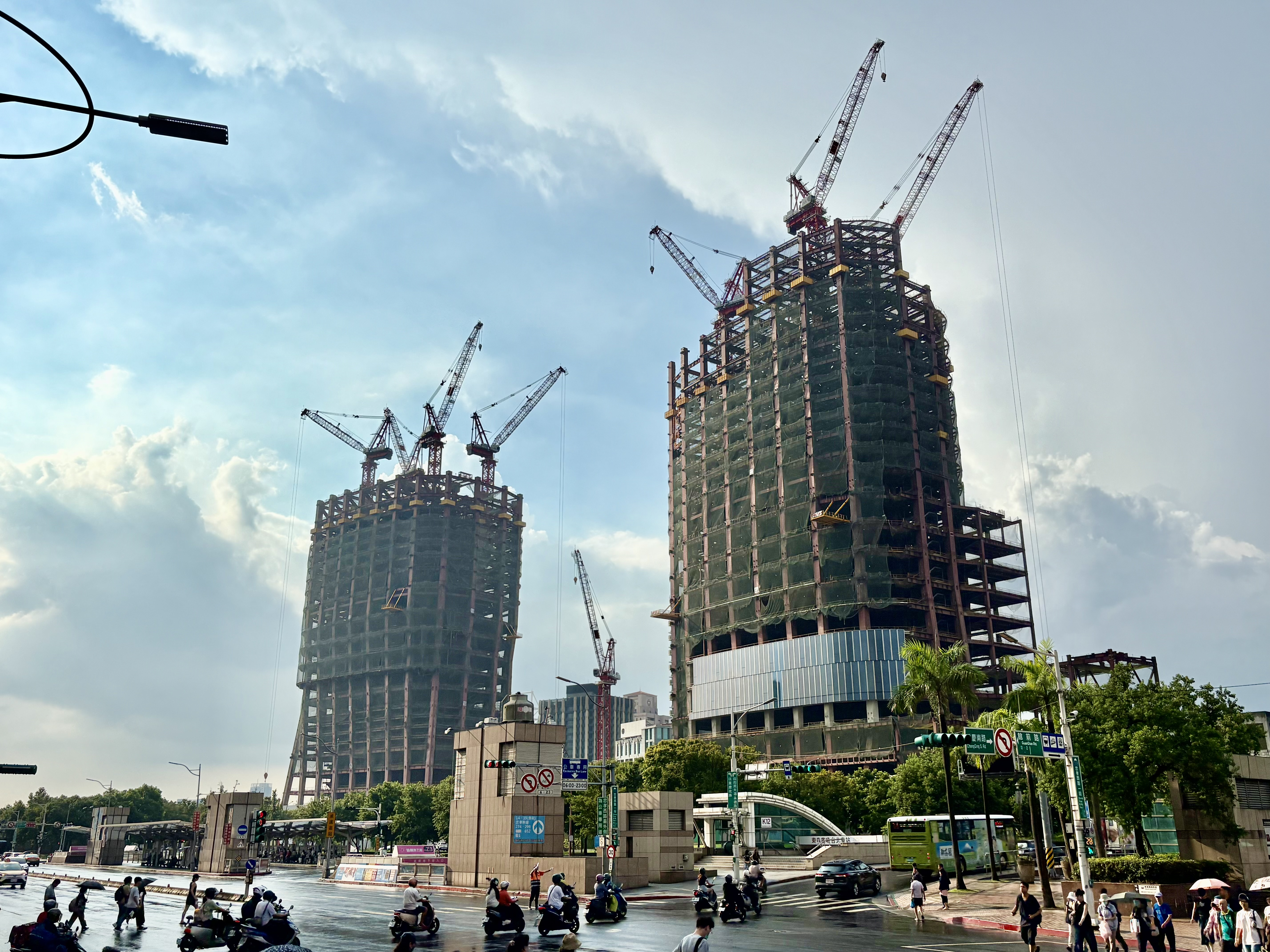
Construction progress August 2025

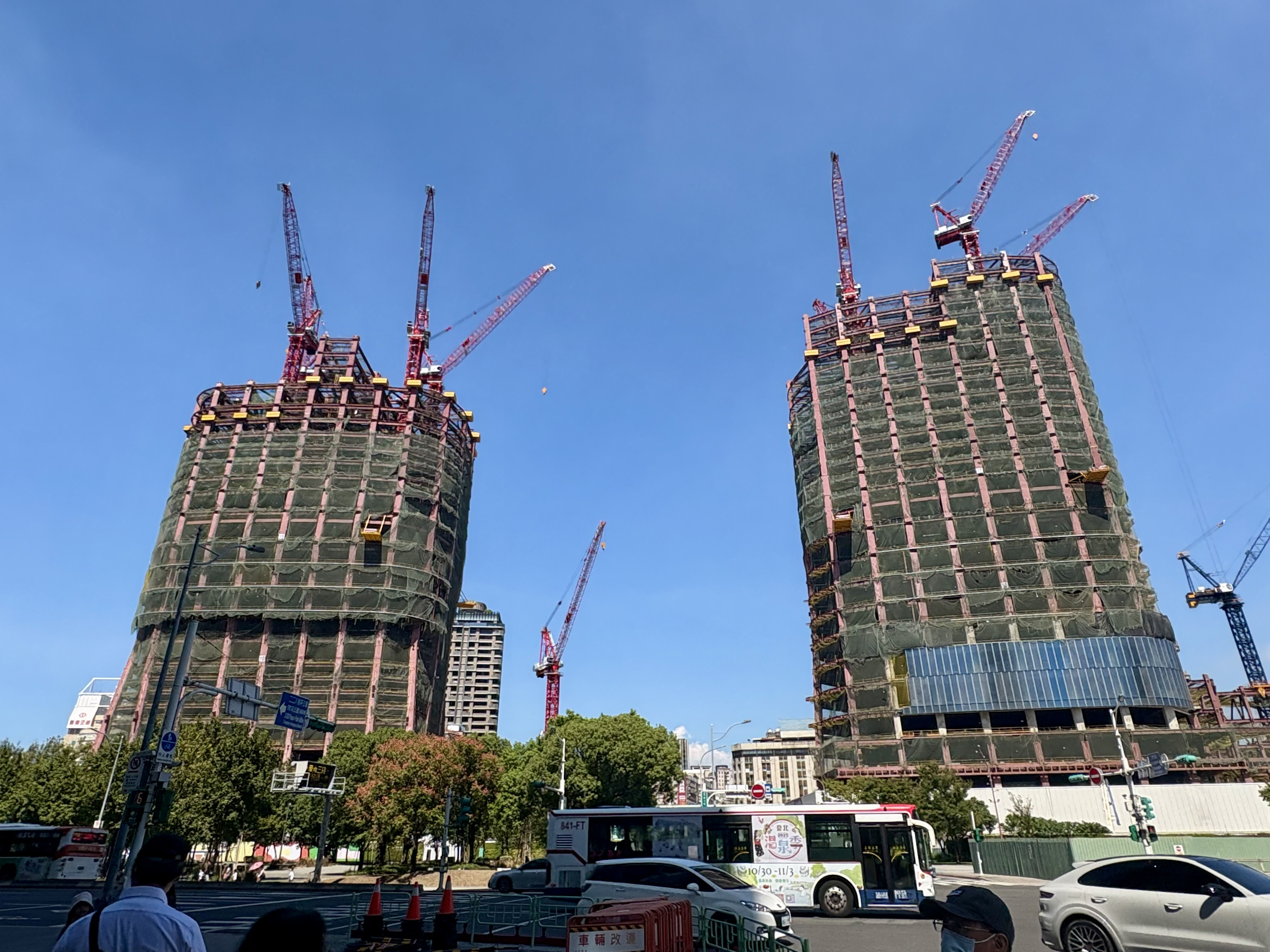
Construction progress October 2025

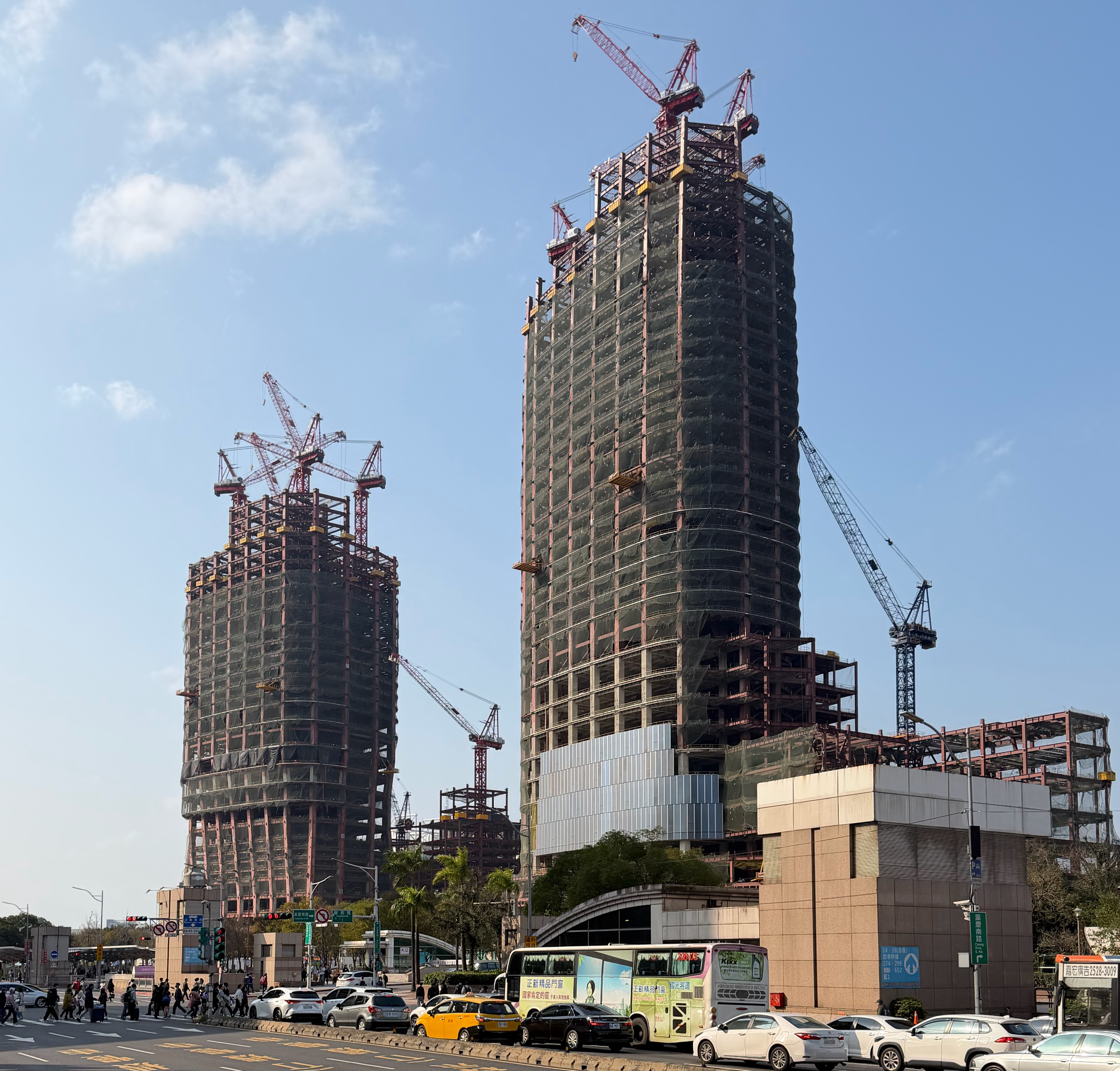
Construction progress February 2026

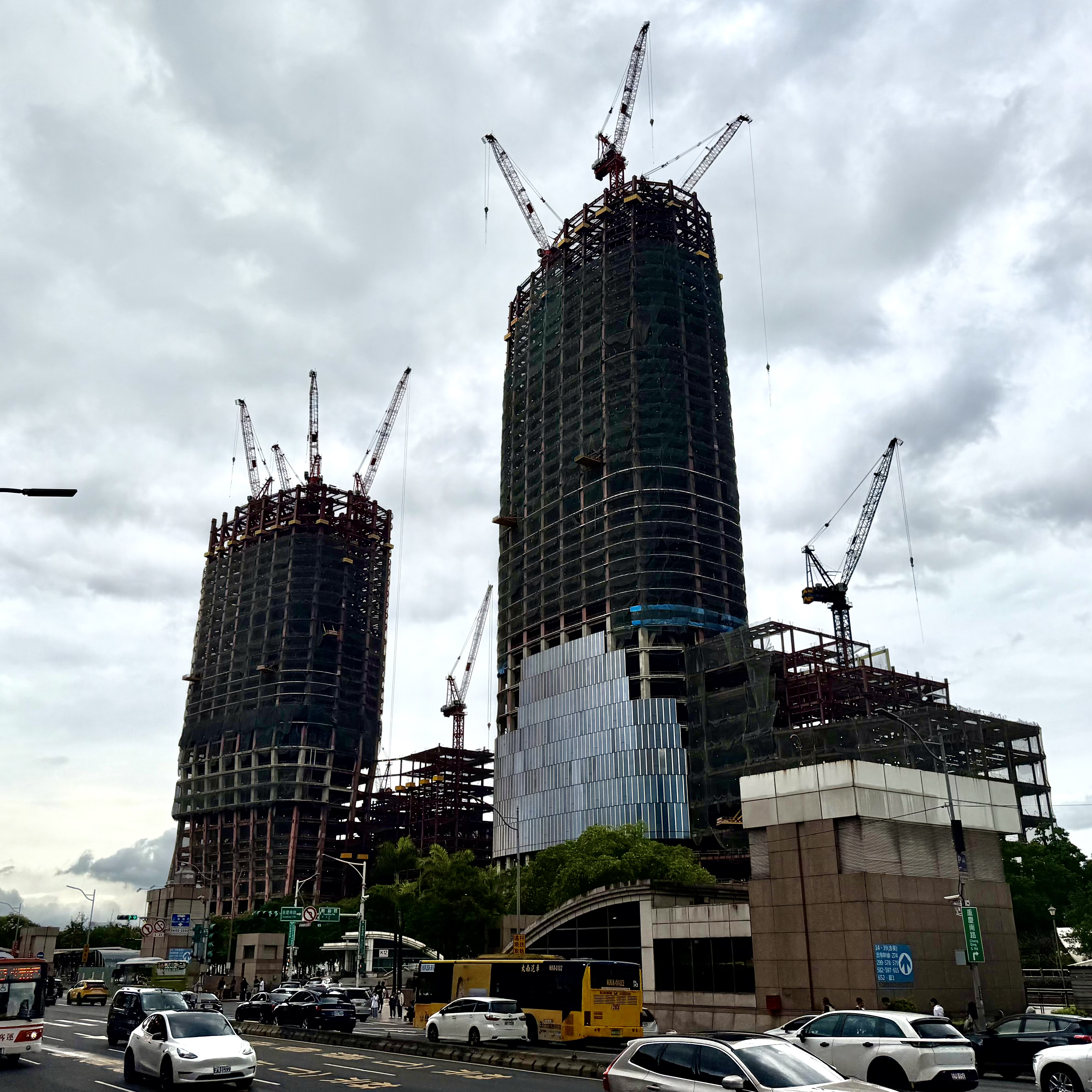
Construction progress May 2026

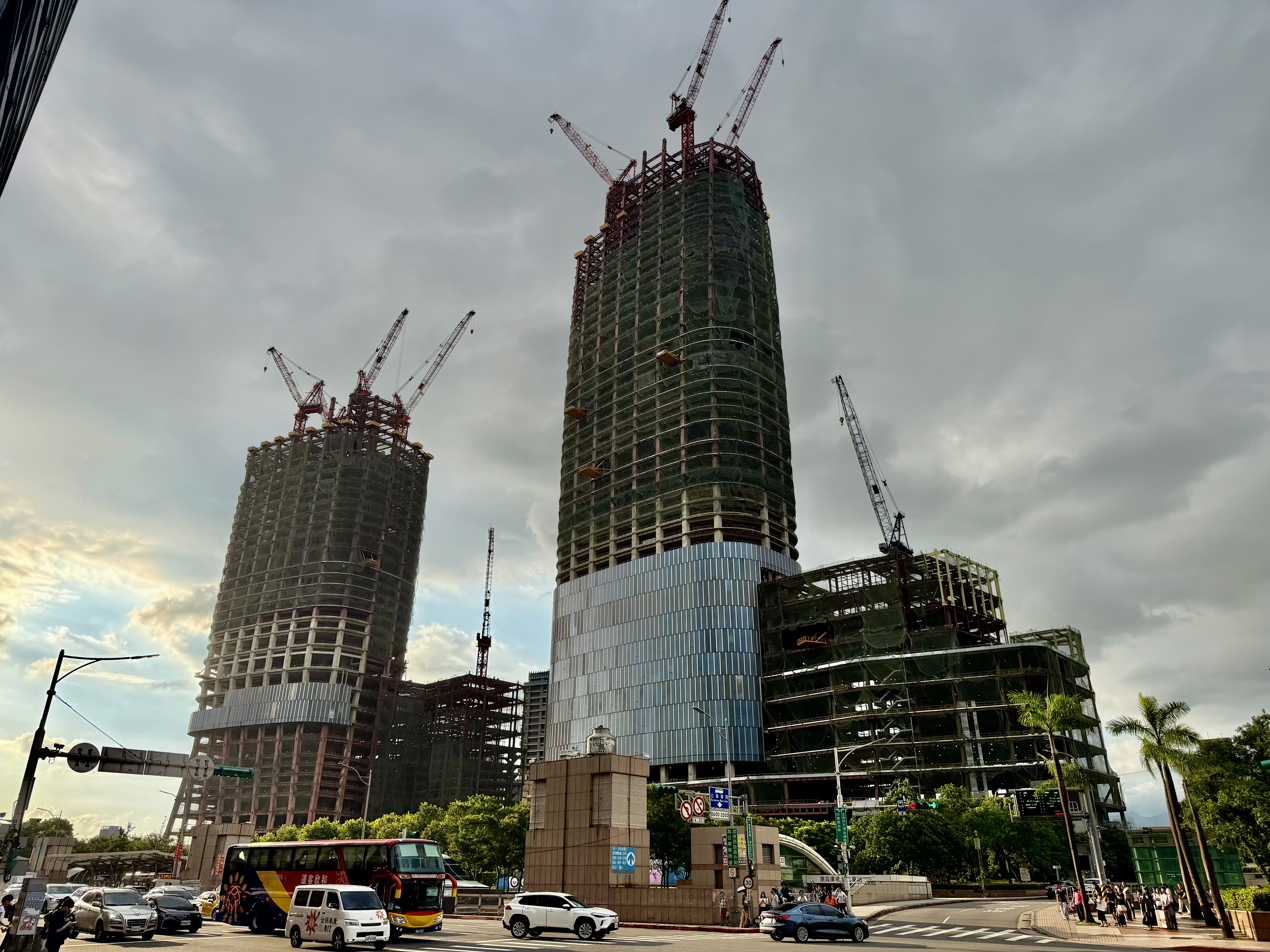
Construction progress July 2026

== See also ==
- List of tallest buildings in Taiwan
- List of tallest buildings in Taipei
- List of tallest buildings in the world
- Taipei 101
- Tuntex Sky Tower
- Shin Kong Life Tower
- Taipei West District Gateway Project
