= Taoyuan Metro =

Rapid transit system in northern Taiwan

Overview
- Native name

Chinese name
- Traditional Chinese: 桃園捷運
- Simplified Chinese: 桃园捷运
Transcriptions
Standard Mandarin
- Hanyu Pinyin: Táoyuán Jiéyùn
- Bopomofo: ㄊㄠˊ ㄩㄢˊ ㄐㄧㄝˊ ㄩㄣˋ
Hakka
- Romanization: Thò-yèn Chhia̍p-yun
Southern Min
- Hokkien POJ: Thô-hn̂g Chia̍t-ūn
- Owner: Taoyuan City Government; Department of Rapid Transit Systems
- Locale: Taoyuan and New Taipei, Taiwan
- Transit type: Rapid transit
- Number of lines: 1
- Number of stations: 22
- Daily ridership: 127,668 (2025)
- Annual ridership: 46,598,881 (2025)
- Website: Taoyuan Metro Corp.

Operation
- Began operation: 2 March 2017; 9 years ago
- Operator: Taoyuan Metro Corporation

Technical
- System length: 51.33 km (31.89 mi)
- Track gauge: 1,435 mm (4 ft 8 1/2 in)
- Electrification: 750 V DC third rail
Planned network
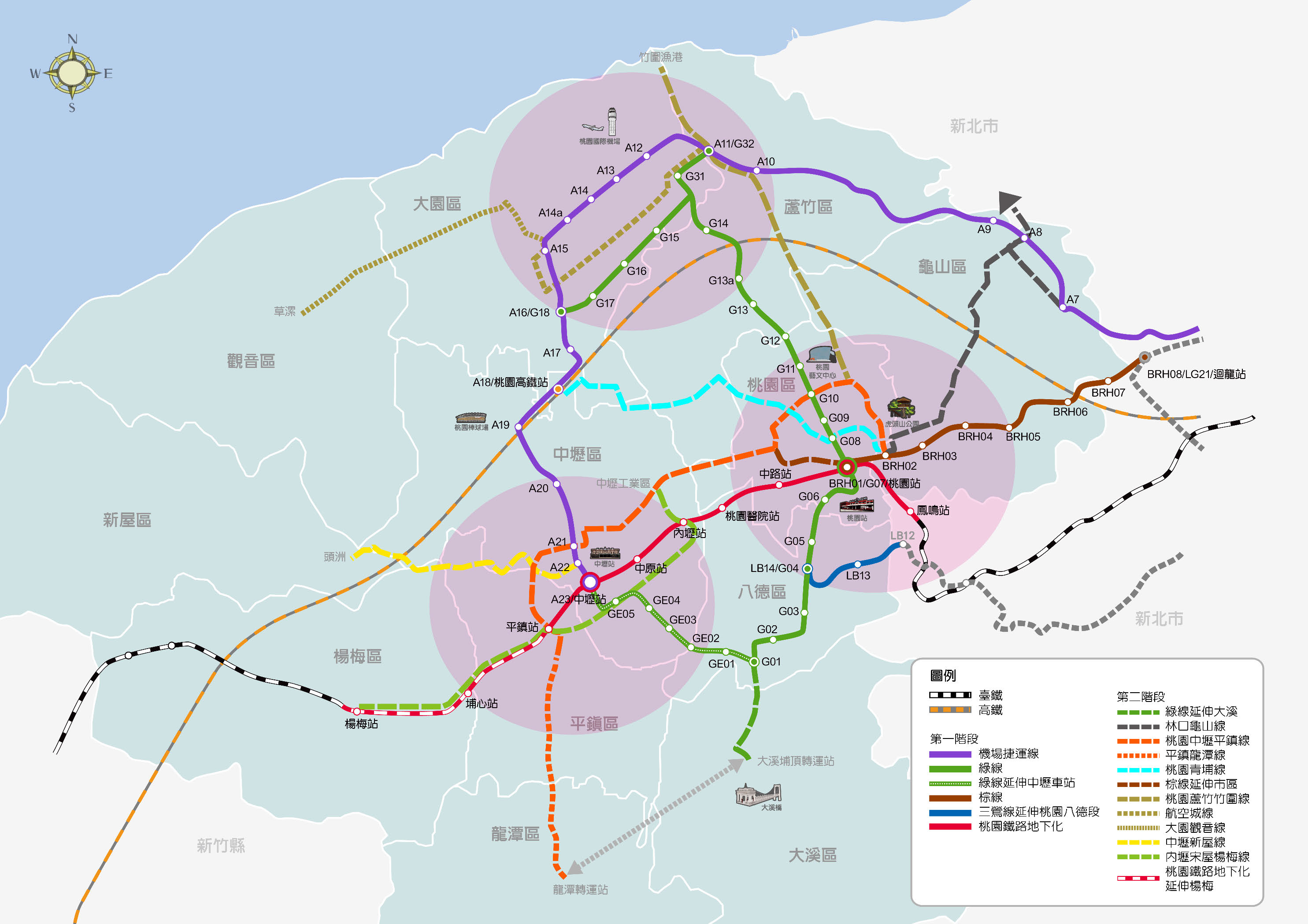

The Taoyuan Metro (formerly Taoyuan Rail Transit and officially Taoyuan Mass Rapid Transit System) is a rapid transit system serving Taoyuan City, as well as parts of New Taipei City and Taipei City, in Taiwan. The most recently proposed network includes 11 lines and extensions, of which two are now under construction. The Taoyuan Airport MRT (Taipei Main Station - Laojie River) is the only line currently in operation. The system opened with the opening of the first line in the system, Taoyuan Airport MRT, for trial passenger service on 2 February 2017 and revenue passenger service on 2 March 2017.

== History ==
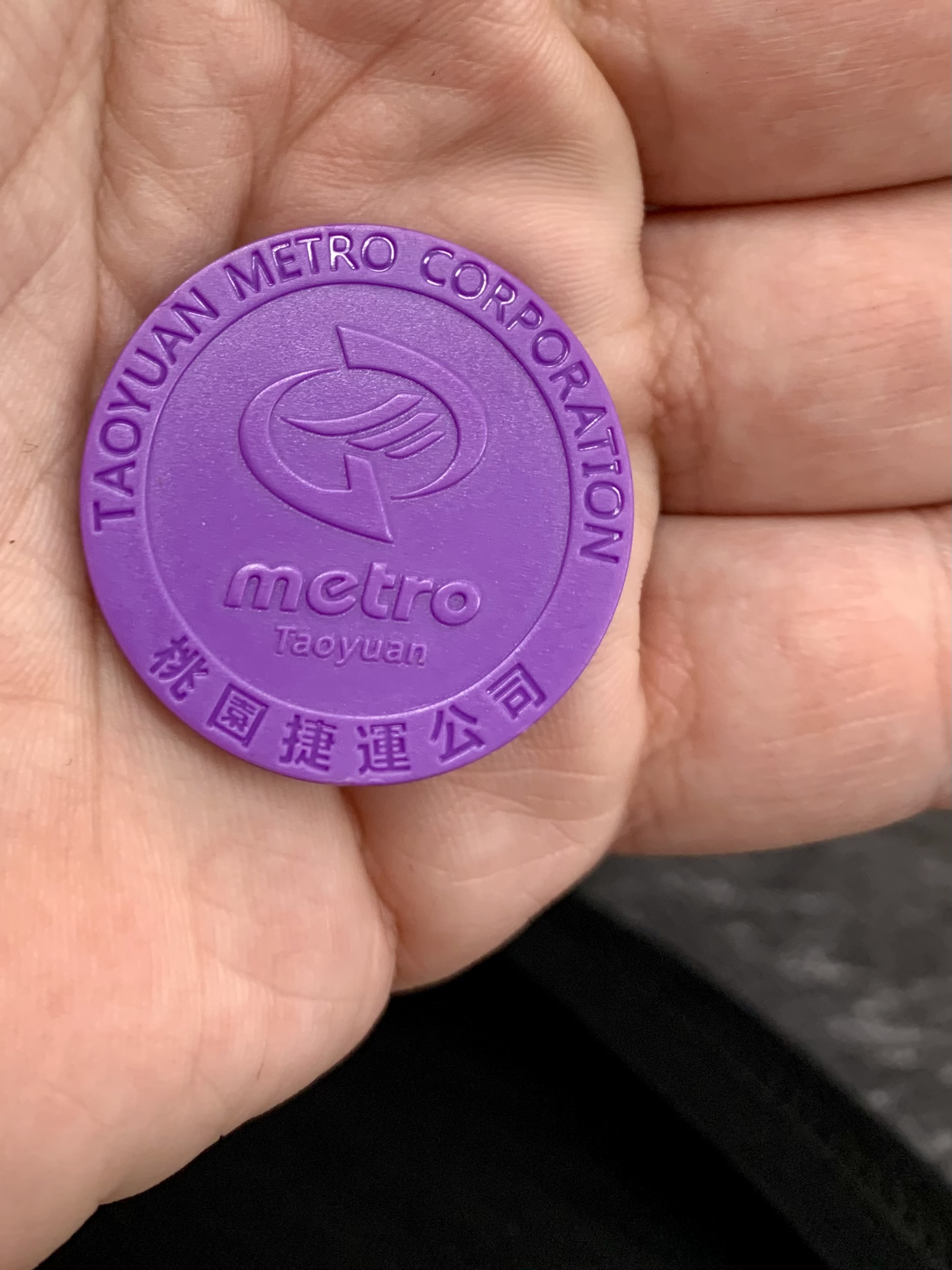
- Taoyuan Metro token
  2 March 2017: The Airport line, officially the Taoyuan Airport MRT, opened for service.

== Network and operations ==
=== Lines ===
Line	Termini (district, city)		Stations	Length (km)	Depot
Taoyuan Airport MRT (Note: The Airport MRT is also known as the Purple line for the color scheme, and is occasionally known as Blue line, as it was partially designated as such.)	Taipei Main Station (Zhongzheng, Taipei)	Laojie River (Zhongli, Taoyuan)	22	51.33	Luchu, Chingpu

== Infrastructure ==
=== Taoyuan Airport MRT ===
==== Services ====
There are two types of Airport MRT services, Commuter and Express. Express trains stop at Taipei Main Station, New Taipei Industrial Park, Chang Gung Memorial Hospital, Airport Terminal 1, and Airport Terminal 2. During peak hours, some Express services continue further, stopping at Taoyuan HSR and Huanbei. Commuter trains stop at every station.

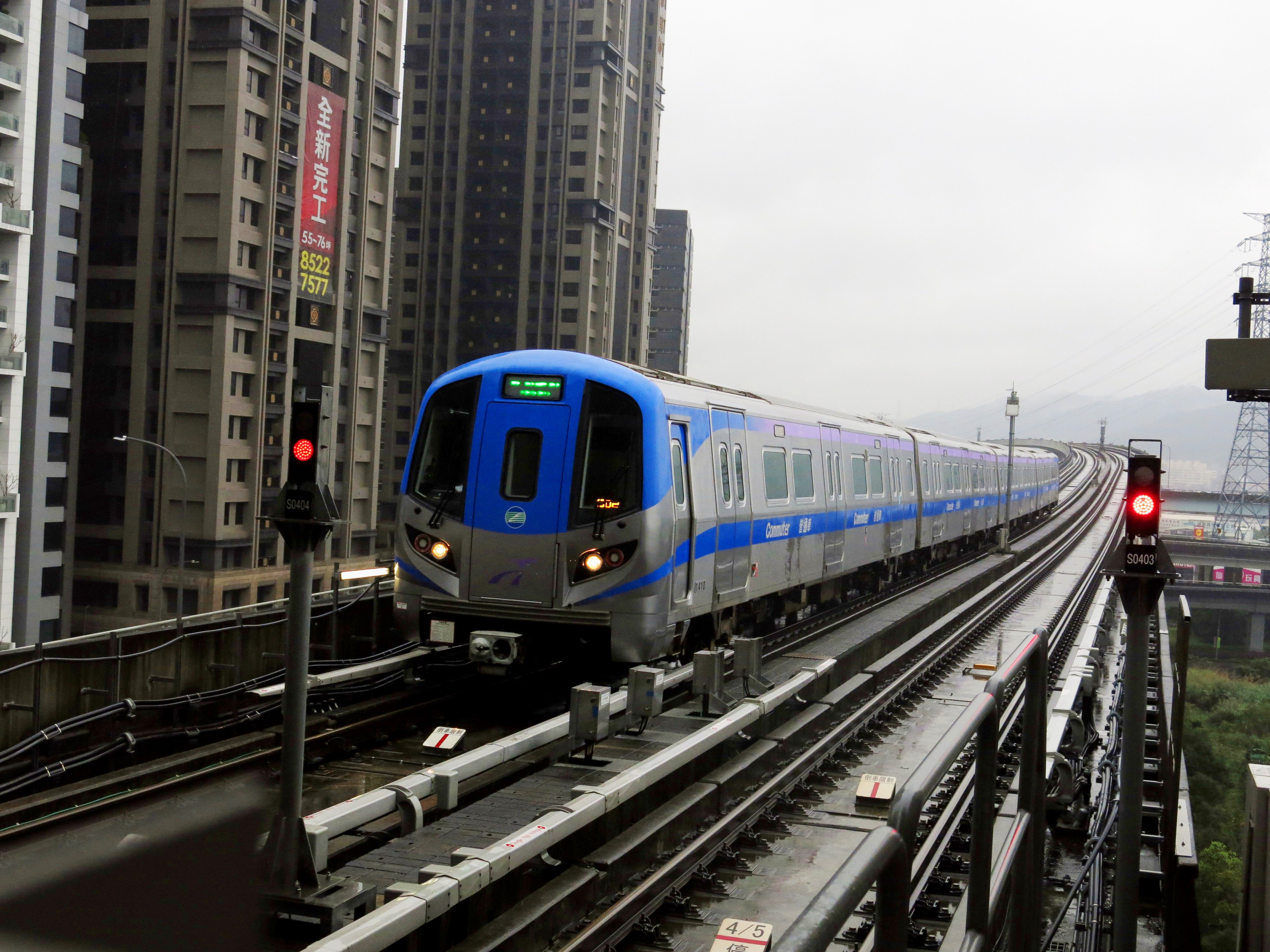
Commuter train

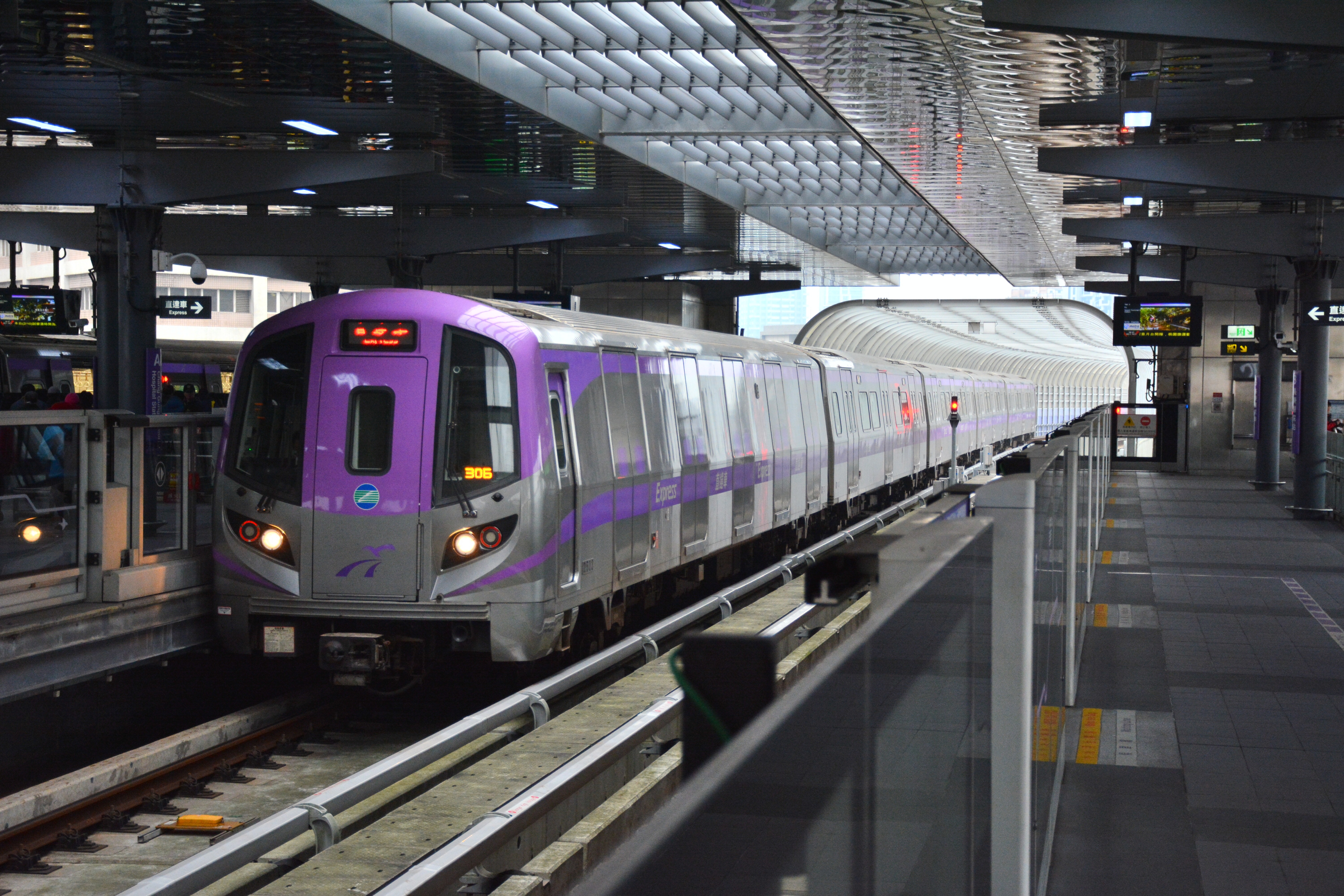
Express train

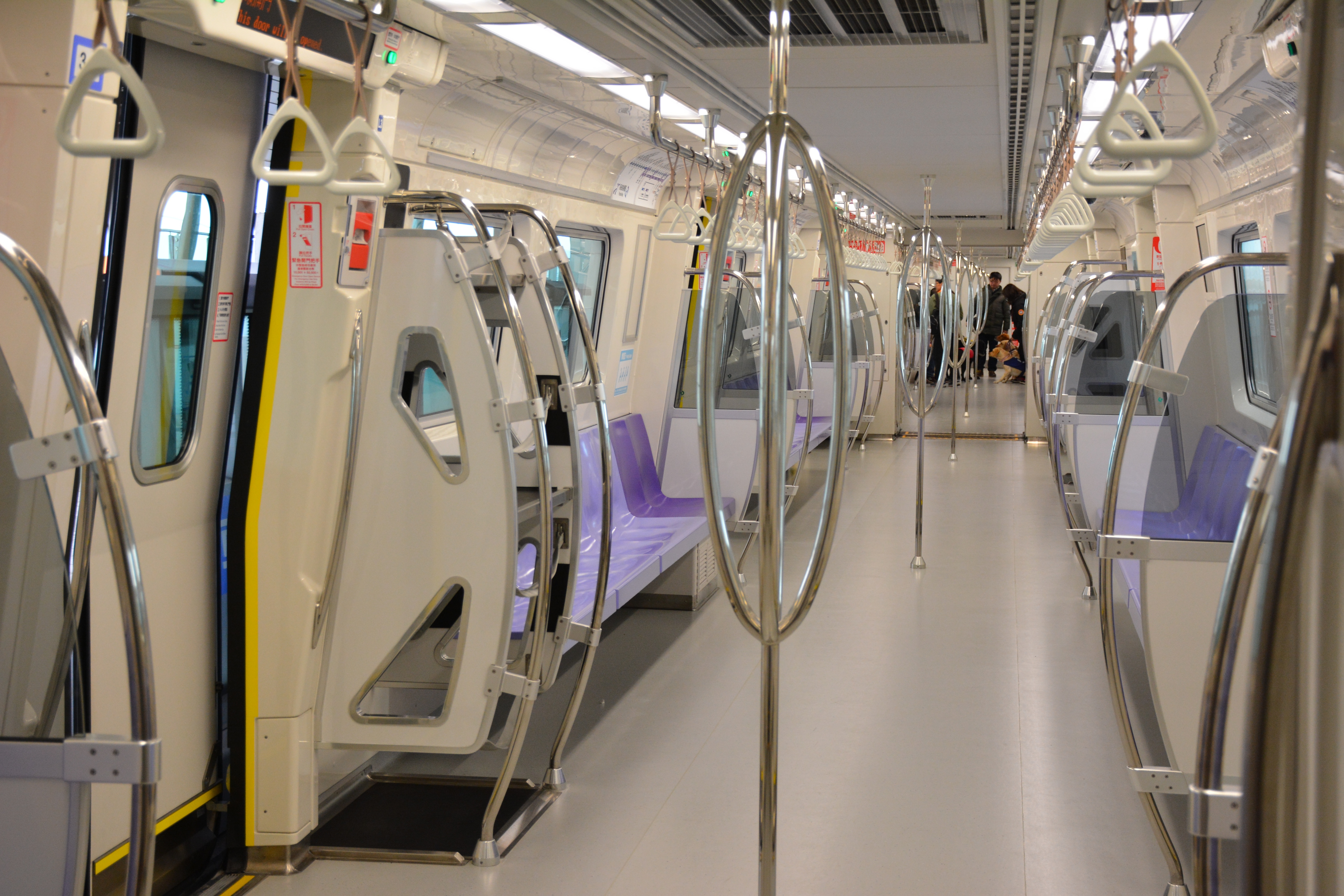
Interior of a Commuter train

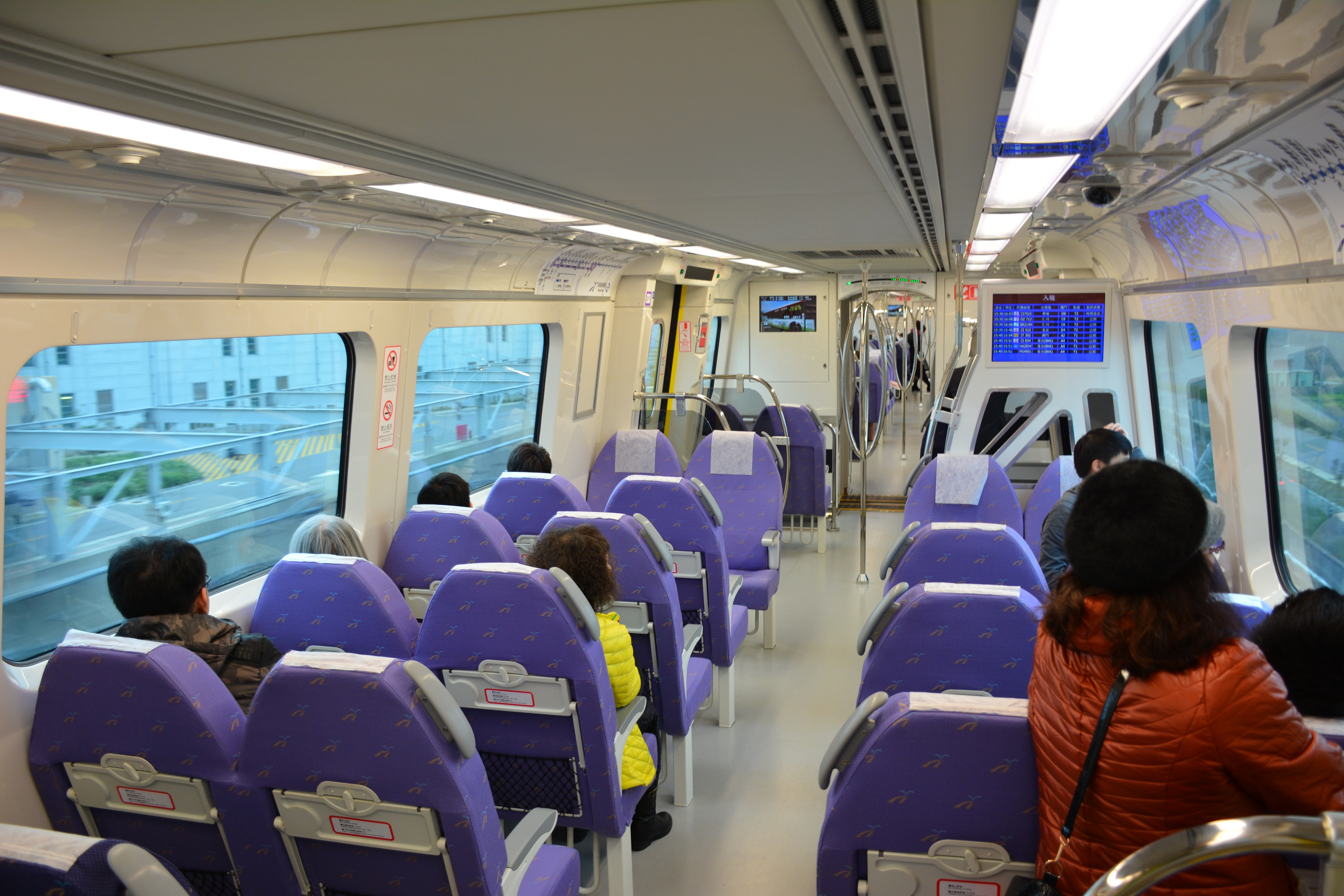
Interior of an Express train

=== Free Wi-Fi ===
Free Wi-Fi is available throughout the system.

== Future expansion ==
All Taoyuan Metro lines will use standard gauge track.

The Taoyuan portion of the TRA Western Line, which runs on 3 ft 6 in (1,067 mm) narrow-gauge tracks (along with the rest of the Taiwan Railway network), will be reconstructed as an underground railway tunnel, with infill stations added at Pingzhen, Zhongyuan, Taoyuan General Hospital, and Zhonglu. It is intended to provide more frequent, rapid transit-style local rail services (similar to TRA grade separation projects in Greater Taipei, Taichung and Kaohsiung).

Line		Section	Termini		Length (km)	Status	Opening date
	Taoyuan Airport MRT	Zhongli extension	Laojie River Railway Station	Zhongli Railway Station	2.06	Under construction	2029
Green line (Taoyuan Metro)	Green line	Main line	Bade	Kengkou	27.8	Under construction	2026–2030
Green line (Taoyuan Metro)	Green line	Aerotropolis Branch line	Shuiwei	Hengshan	27.8	Bidding process	2032
Green line (Taoyuan Metro)	Green line	Zhongli extension	Bade	Zhongli Railway Station	7.2	Bidding process	2031
Green line (Taoyuan Metro)	Green line	Daxi extension	Bade	Daxi	4.33	Feasibility study	TBD
Brown line (Taoyuan Metro)	Brown line	Main line	Taoyuan Main Station	Huilong	11.38	Bidding process	2032
Orange line (Taoyuan Metro)	Orange line	Zhongli-Pingzhen line	Taoyuan Arena	Pingzhen	21	Feasibility study	2040s
Orange line (Taoyuan Metro)	Orange line	Pingzhen-Longtan line	Pingzhen	Longtan Bus Station	9	Feasibility study	2040s

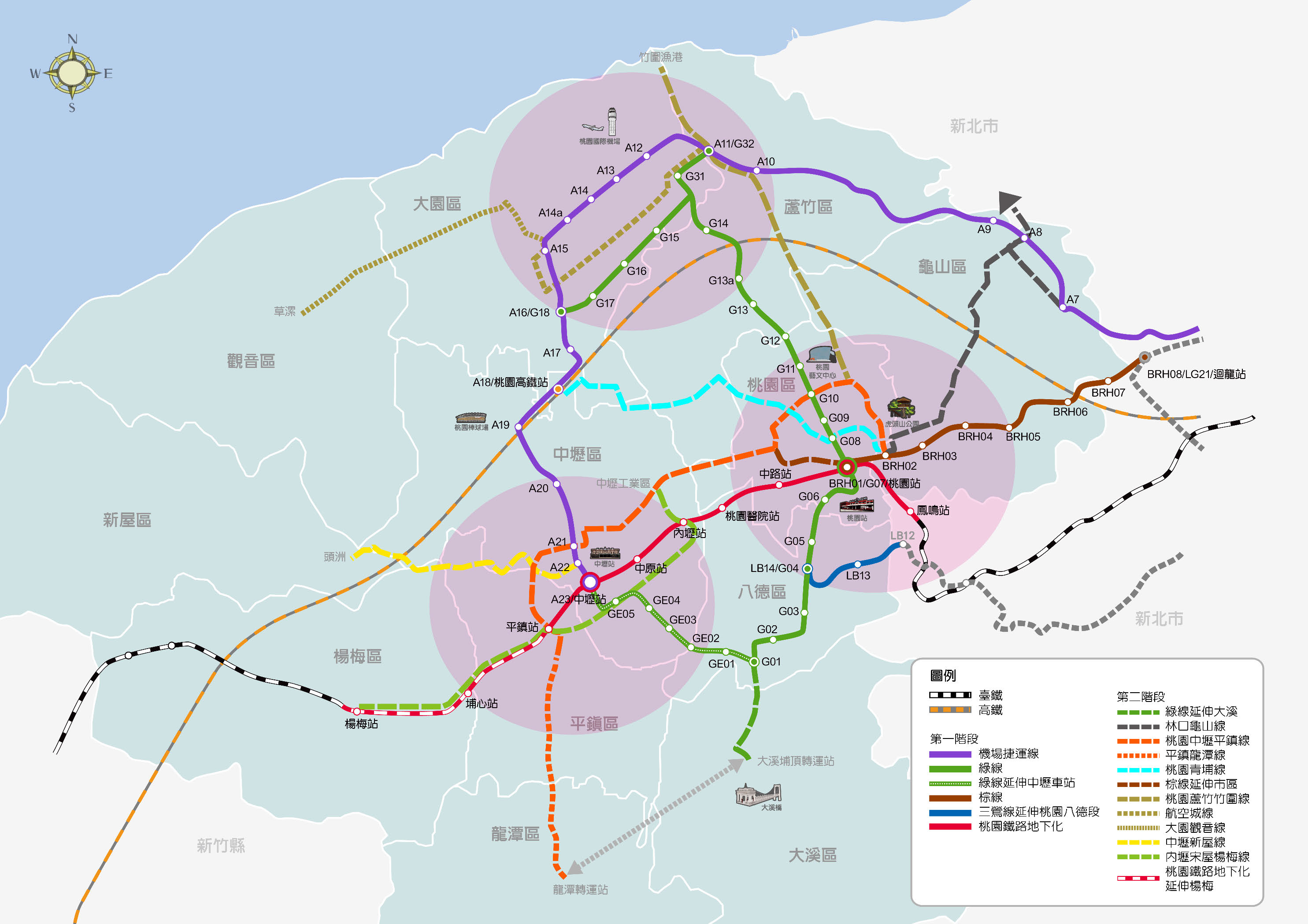
Map of planned network

=== Construction ===
The Green line passed an environmental impact assessment in July 2014. Construction of the Green line started in October 2018, and is expected to open in three phases, in 2026, 2028, and 2030. Construction of the Brown line was expected to commence in late 2025, and is expected to be completed by 2032.

== See also ==
- Rail transport in Taiwan
- Transportation in Taiwan
