= Taipei Main Station (Taoyuan Metro) =

Terminus of the Taiwanese airport rail link

Taipei Main Station A1 台北車站
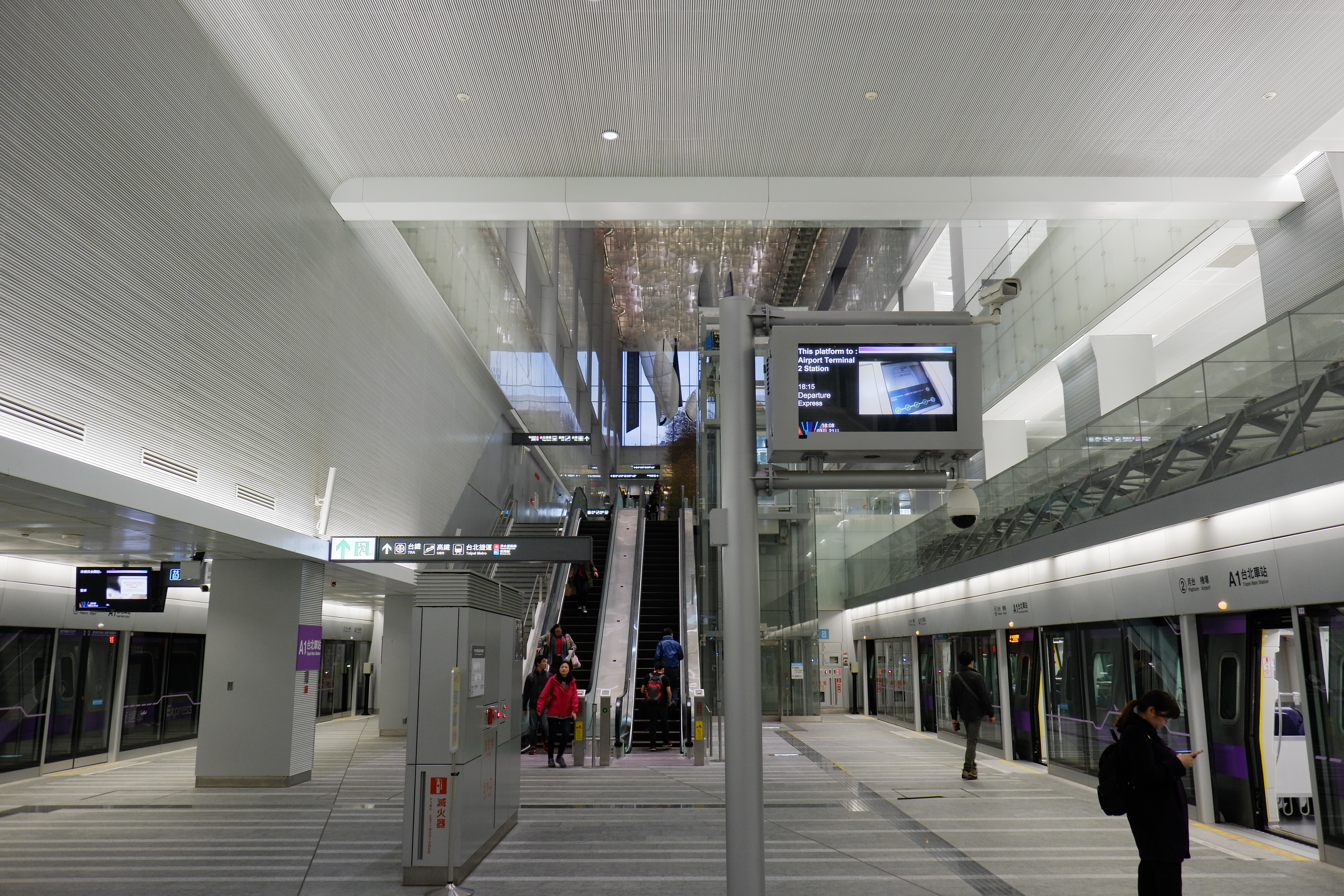
- Express platform

General information
- Location: 8 Zhengzhou Rd; Zhongzheng District, Taipei; Taiwan
- Coordinates: 25°02′55″N 121°30′51″E
- Operator: Taoyuan Metro Corporation
- Line: Taoyuan Airport MRT
- Connections: Taipei Main Station: Tamsui–Xinyi line Bannan line Western Trunk line (100) Taiwan High Speed Rail (02/TPE): Beimen: Songshan–Xindian line

Construction
- Structure type: Underground

Other information
- Station code: A1

History
- Opened: 2017-03-02

Passengers
- Aug 2025: 57,977 (entries and exits, daily)
- Rank: 1/22

Services
Preceding station	Taoyuan Metro	Following station
Terminus	Taoyuan Airport MRT Express	New Taipei Industrial Park towards Airport Terminal 2 or Huanbei
Terminus	Taoyuan Airport MRT Commuter	Sanchong towards Laojie River
Preceding station	Taipei Metro	Following station
Zhongshan towards Songshan	Songshan–Xindian line transfer at Beimen	Ximen towards Taipower Building or Xindian
Location

Taipei Main Station is the eastern terminus of the Taoyuan Airport MRT in Zhongzheng District, Taipei, Taiwan. Located roughly 250 metres (820 ft) west of Taipei railway station and 200 metres (660 ft) east of Beimen metro station, it is connected to the Taipei railway station through a 115 metres (377 ft) long underground walkway, and to Beimen station through another underground walkway. It is the busiest station of the Taoyuan Airport MRT. The station is served by both express and commuter trains, and provides in-town check in services for outbound flights. Currently, four airlines offer this service.

== Overview ==
This three-level, underground station has two island platforms with four tracks. It is equipped with eight accessible elevators and seven exits. The station is 328 metres (1,076 ft 1 in) long and 44 metres (144 ft 4 in) to 102 metres (334 ft 8 in) wide. It opened for trial service on February 2, 2017, and for commercial service on March 2, 2017. It is located directly underneath the future Taipei Twin Towers.

== Layout ==
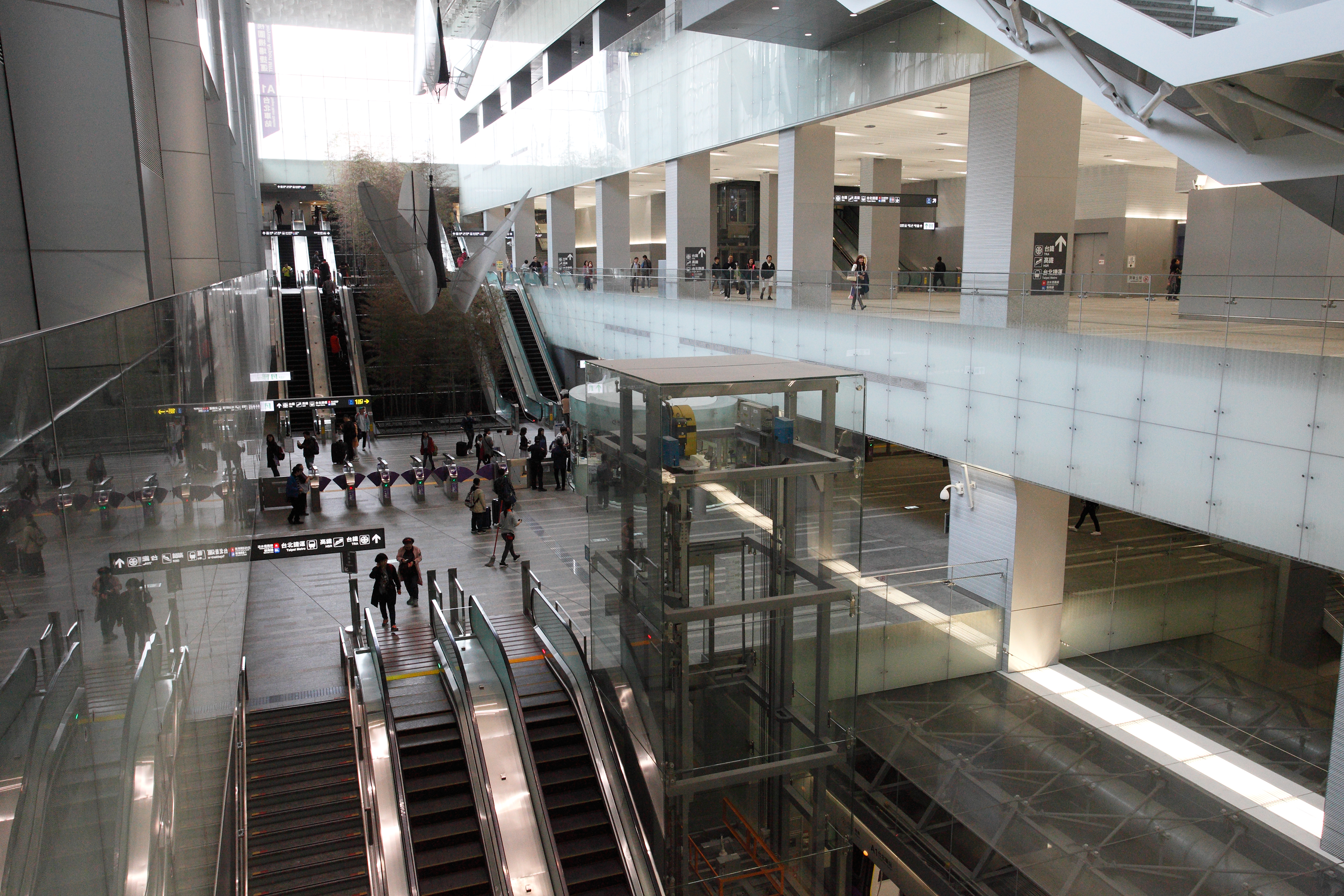
Entrance hall

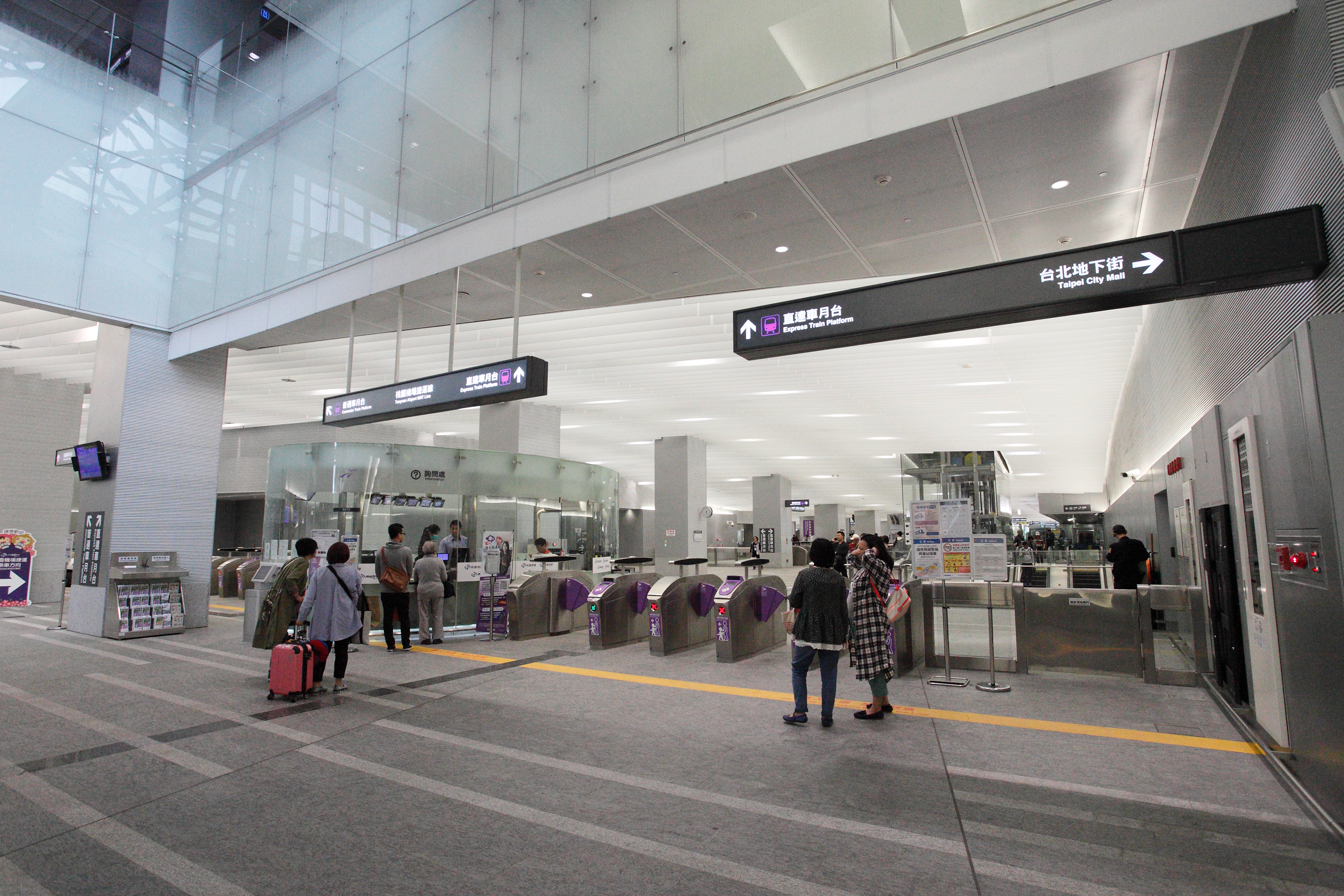
Faregates and information desk

Street level	Entrance/exit	Station entrance
B1	Lobby	Station lobby, information counter, automatic ticket machines, faregates, airline check-in
B2	Platform 1	← Airport MRT Express toward Airport / Huanbei (New Taipei Industrial Park)
B2	Island platform, doors will open on the right/left
B2	Platform 2	← Airport MRT Express toward Airport / Huanbei (New Taipei Industrial Park)
B2	Platform 3	← Airport MRT Commuter toward Laojie River (Sanchong)
B2	Island platform, doors will open on the right/left
B2	Platform 4	← Airport MRT Commuter toward Laojie River (Sanchong)

== Around the station ==
- Taipei City Mall
- Taipei Travel Plaza
- Shin Kong Life Tower
- Taipei Twin Towers (under construction)
- National Taiwan Museum

== See also ==
- Gate of Taipei
- Taipei Bus Station
- Taipei Main Station
- Beimen Station
