= Qingpu Special District =

District of Taoyuan, Taiwan

Coordinates: 25°00′48″N 121°12′54″E

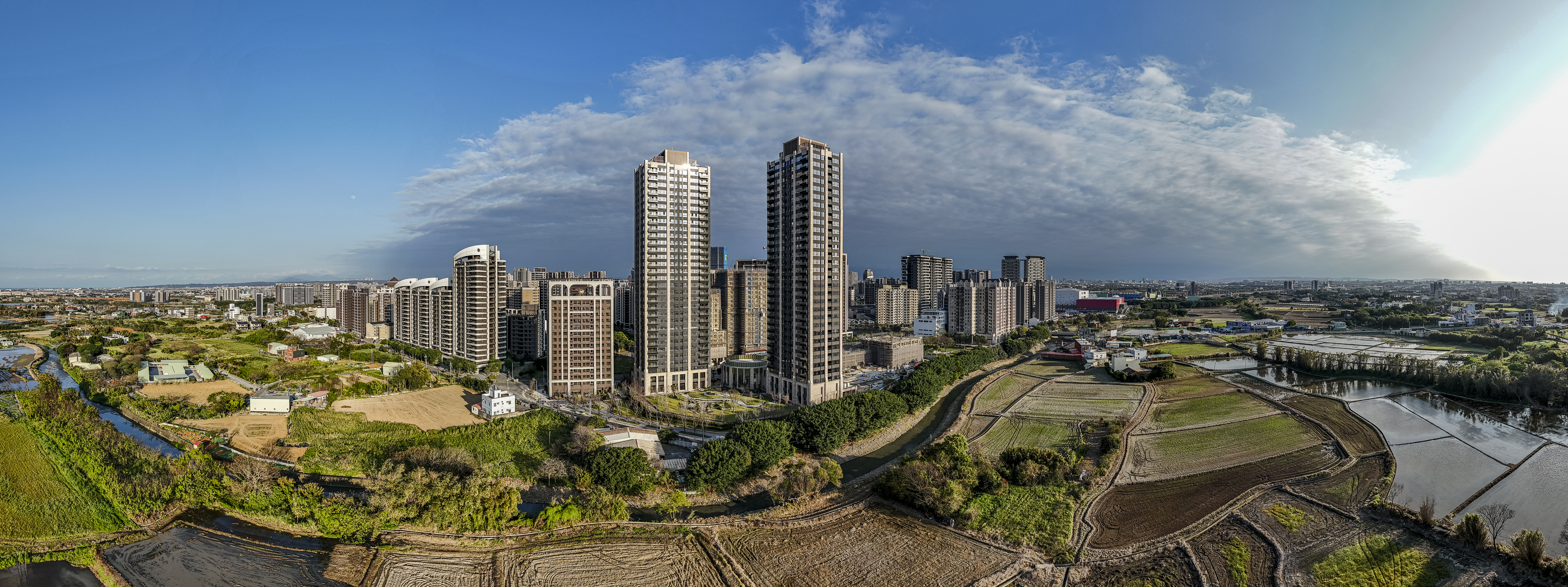
Skyline of Qingpu Special District.

Qingpu Special District (Chinese: 青埔特區), also known as Taoyuan Qingpu HSR Special Area, is located at the border of Zhongli District and Dayuan District in Taoyuan, Taiwan. The total area of Qingpu Special District is 490 hectares. It was designed in the 2000s after the Taoyuan HSR station opened in 2007 and developed from the 2010s onward, before the city was upgraded from county to special municipality. Qingpu Special District was designated as the new prime central business district, administration center, shopping center, and transport hub of Taoyuan City, replacing the old city center around Taoyuan railway station. Important infrastructure, such as Taoyuan HSR station, Rakuten Taoyuan Baseball Stadium, Taoyuan Sunlight Arena and Hengshan Calligraphy Art Center, is located within this area. The decision to earmark Qingpu as the new prime center reflects its location: it is close to Taoyuan International Airport and is only one or two stops away from cities such as Hsinchu and Taipei by high-speed rail. In 2016, Qingpu hosted the Taiwan Lantern Festival.

== Future developments ==
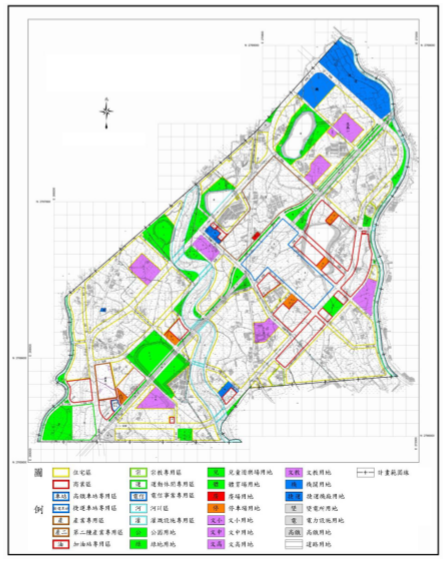
Plan of Qingpu Special District.

Qingpu Special District and Taoyuan Aerotropolis will be the demonstration sites for IoT-related industries such as 5G, autonomous cars, and smart traffic, linked to the Asia Silicon Valley Development Plan, which plans to establish an Innovation and Research and Development Center, and the Taoyuan Convention and Exhibition Center in Qingpu. Qingpu is often said to be the Xinyi Planning District of Taoyuan.

Despite its recent rapid progress in development, Qingpu still lacks many fundamental facilities, such as medical facilities and higher education institutes, as a self-contained planned district. National Tsinghua University has planned to open its own hospital Tsinghua University Taoyuan Hospital, which was approved by the Medical Affairs Review Committee of the Ministry of Health and Welfare on March 14, 2022, and is planned to start operations in 2027. It plans to serve residents from the surrounding districts of Luzhu, Dayuan, and Guanyin, which currently lack large hospitals. The general acute hospital beds will be expanded to reach the 499 beds approved by the Taoyuan Municipal Health Bureau before the medical review meeting to fully meet the local medical needs.

== Transportation ==
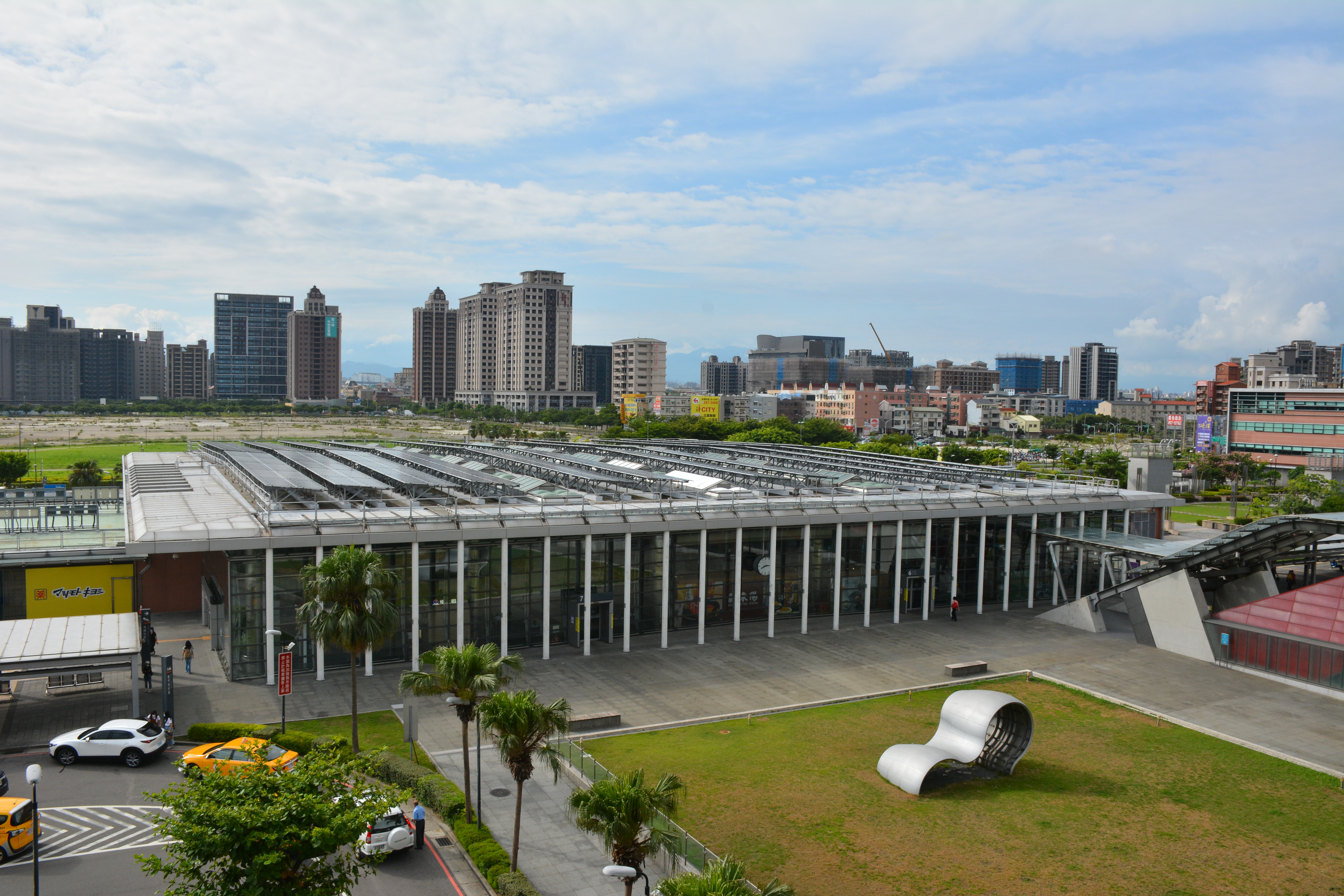
Taoyuan HSR station

=== Rail ===
==== High Speed Rail ====
- Taoyuan HSR station

==== Metro ====
- Taoyuan Airport MRT
  - Linghang metro station
  - Taoyuan HSR station
  - Taoyuan Sports Park metro station

=== Road ===
- National Freeway 1
- National Freeway 2
- Provincial Highway 31

== Public Facilities ==
- Taoyuan Convention and Exhibition Center

=== Sports ===
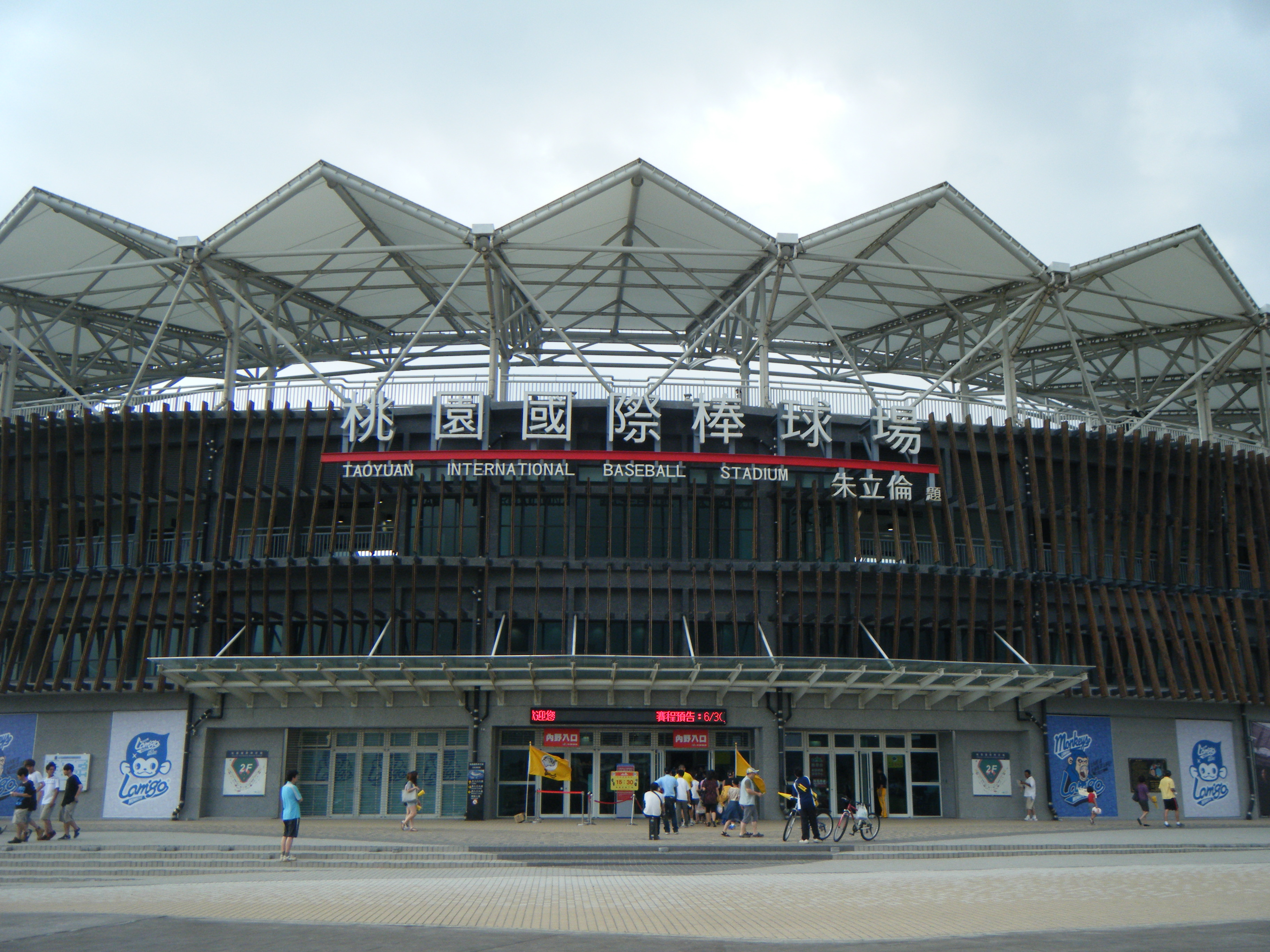
Taoyuan International Baseball Stadium

- Taoyuan International Baseball Stadium
- Qingpu Sports Park

=== Parks ===
- Qingtang Park

=== Education ===
- Taoyuan Municipal Dayuan International Senior High School

=== Commercial Facilities ===
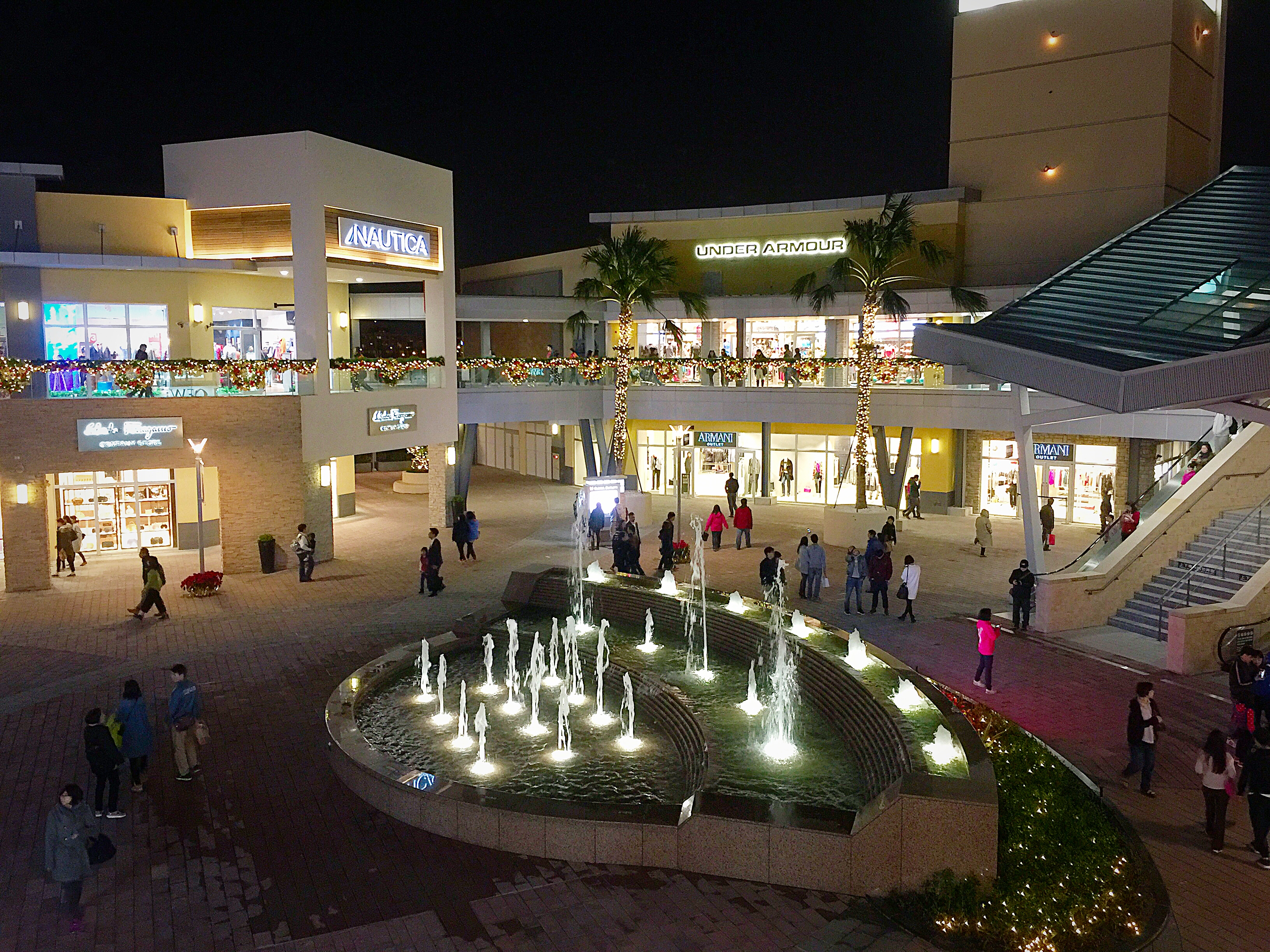
Gloria Outlets

- Gloria Outlets
- Global Mall Taoyuan A19
- IKEA Taoyuan Store
- Shin Kong Cinemas Taoyuan Qingpu Store
- Xpark

==== Supermarkets ====
- Carrefour Qingpu Store
- Funcom Supermarket Qingpu Store
- PX Mart Zhongli Linghang & Dayuan Chunde Stores

== Gallery ==
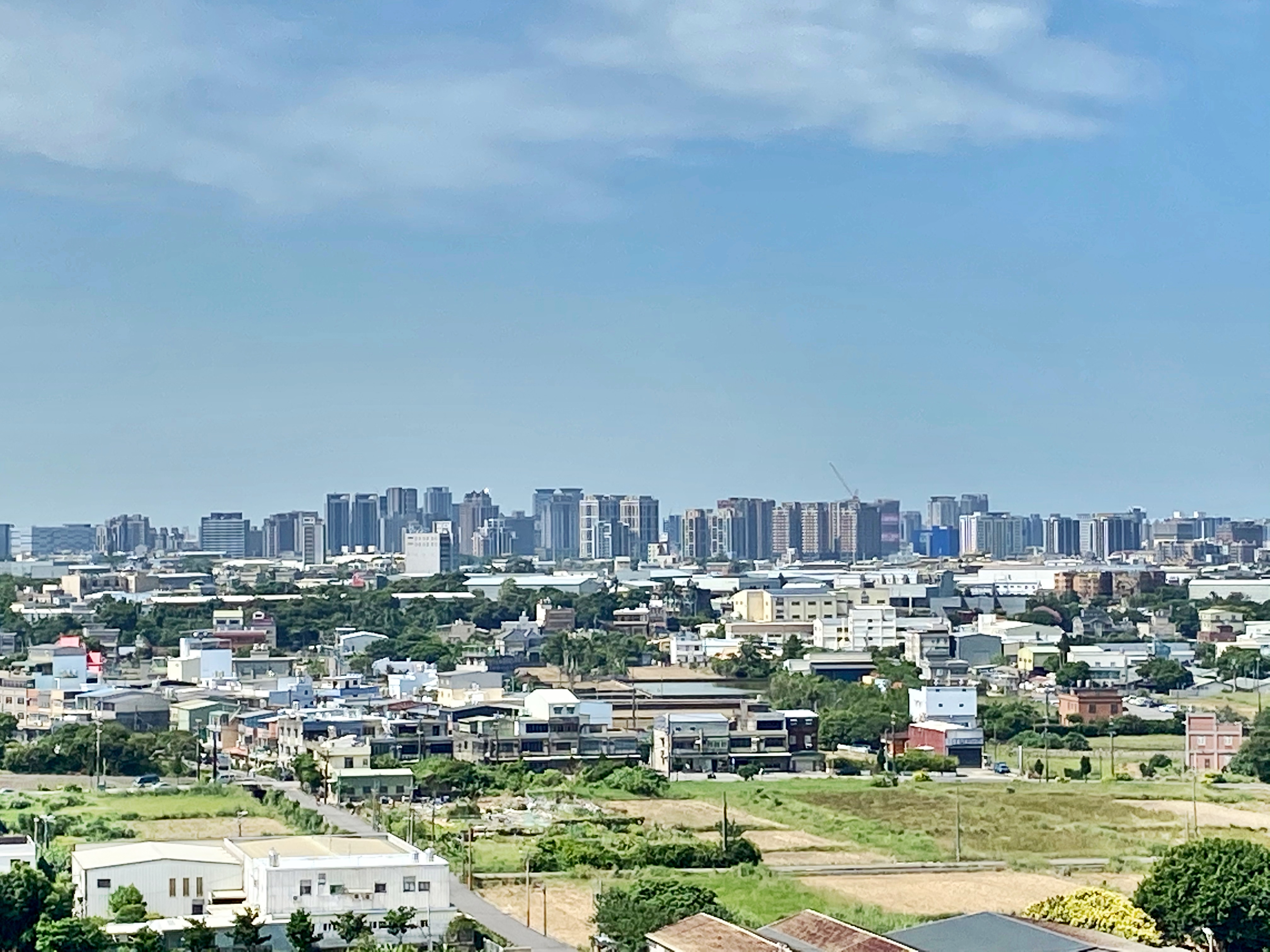
Skyline of Qingpu

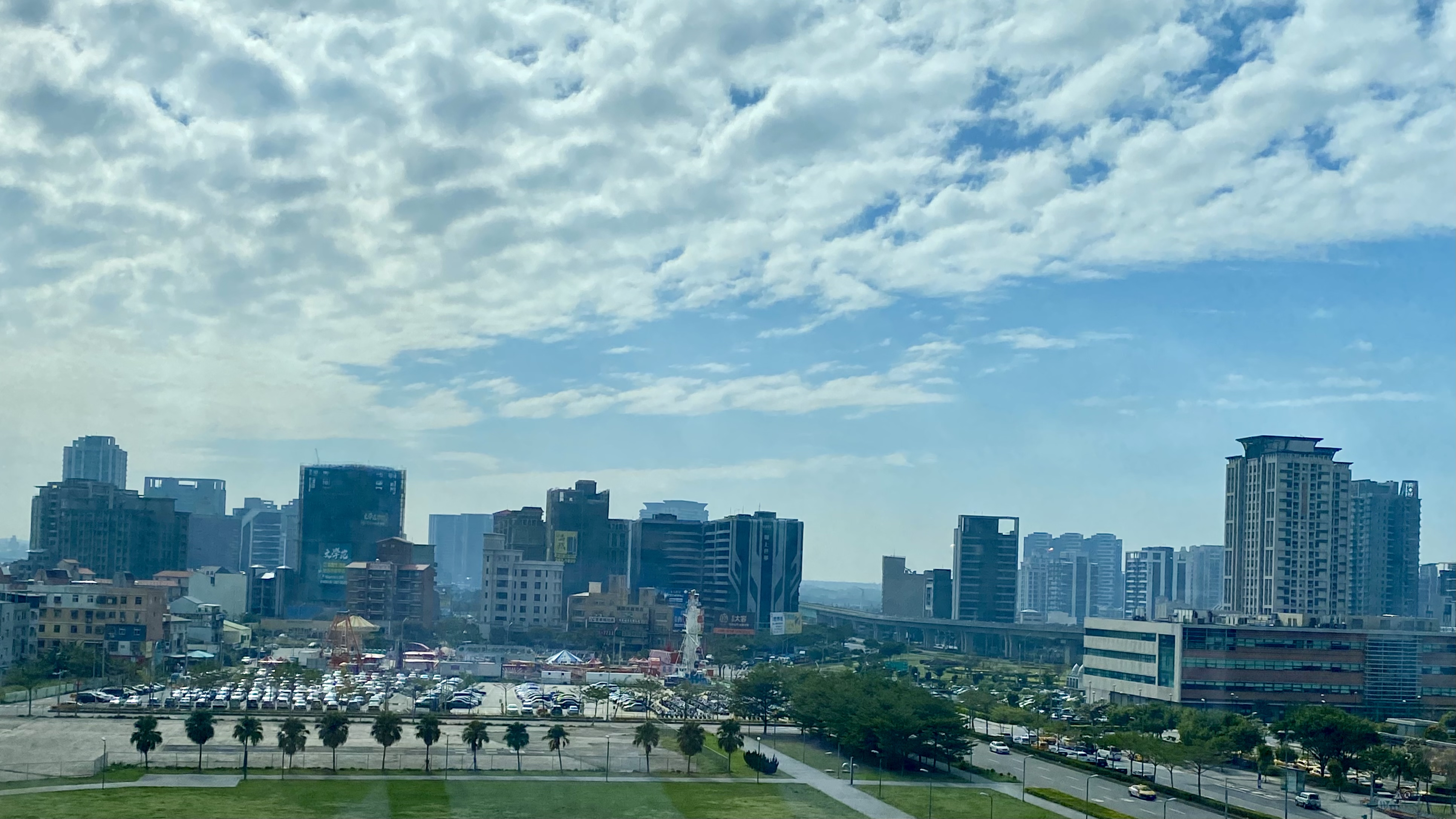
View from IKEA Taoyuan Store

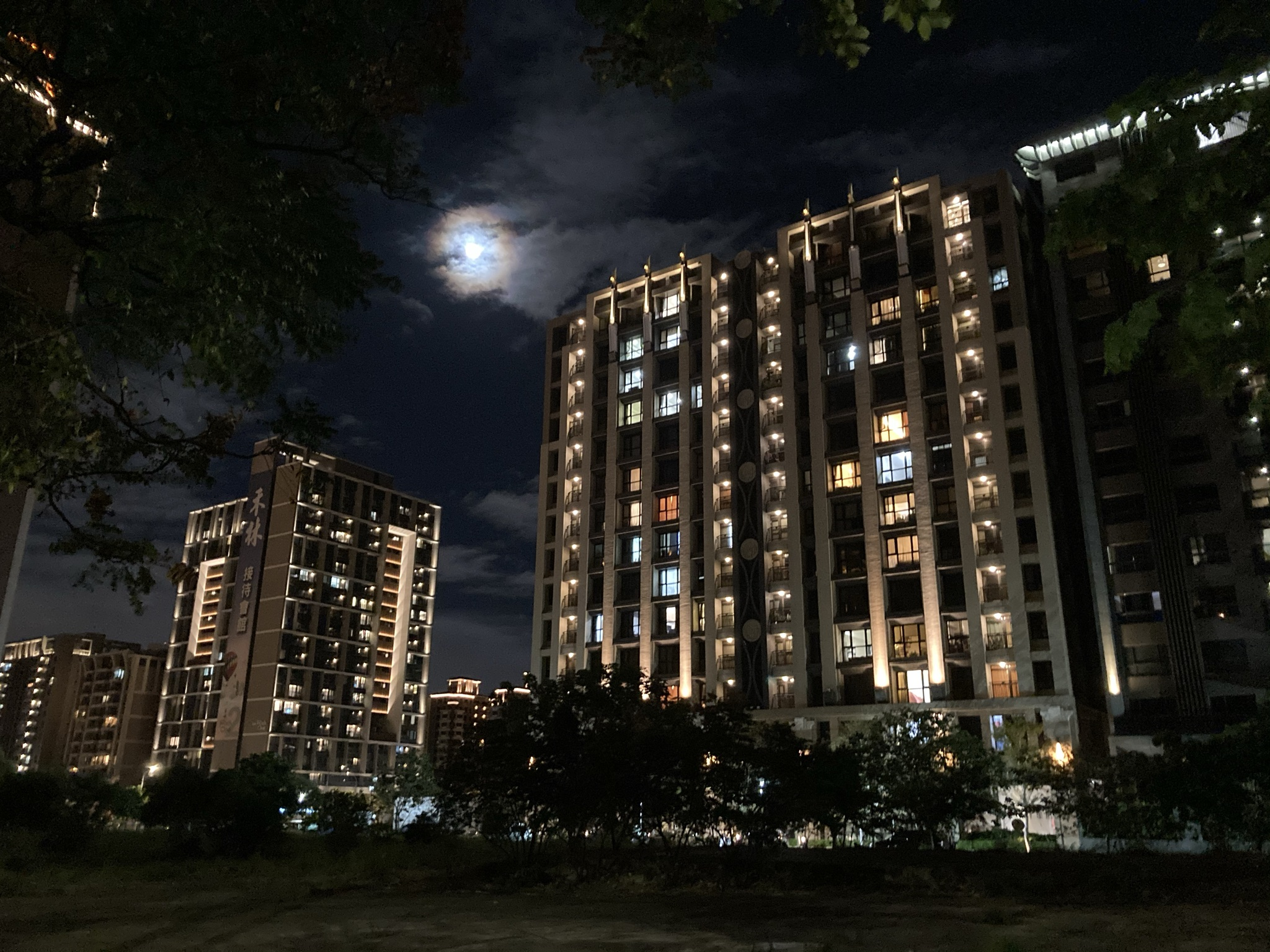
The district at night

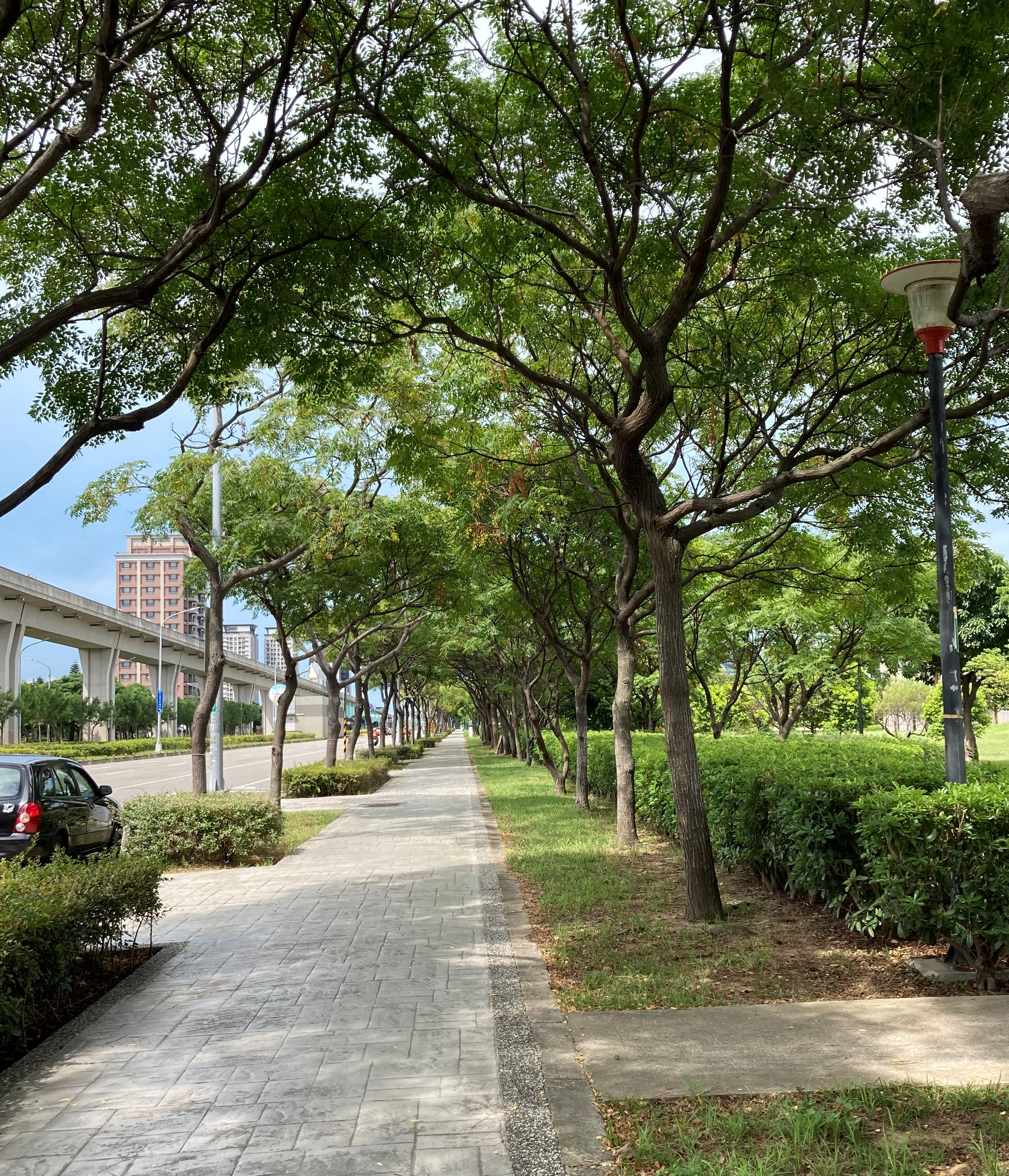
Pedestrian walkways

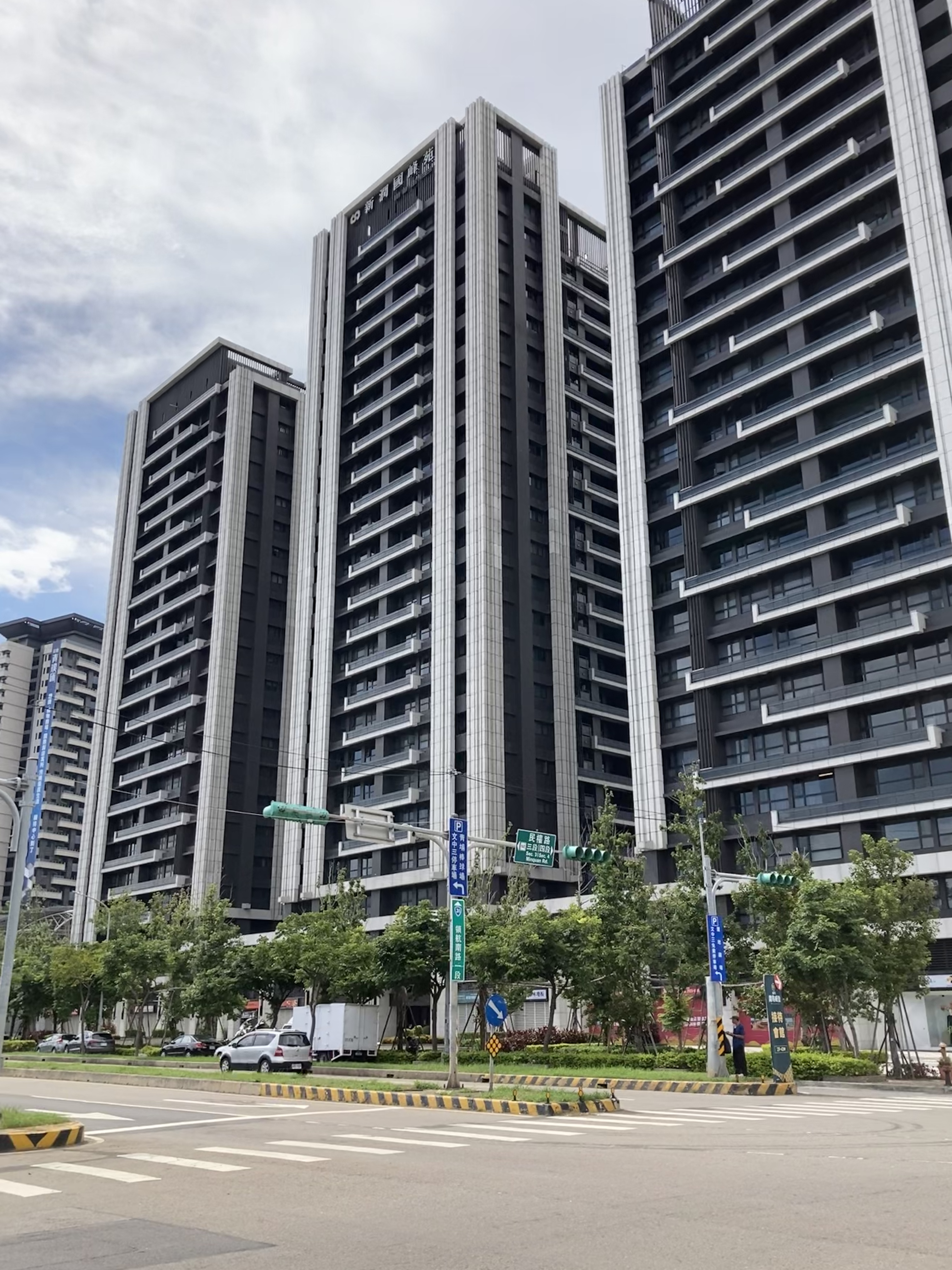
Apartment buildings in Qingpu

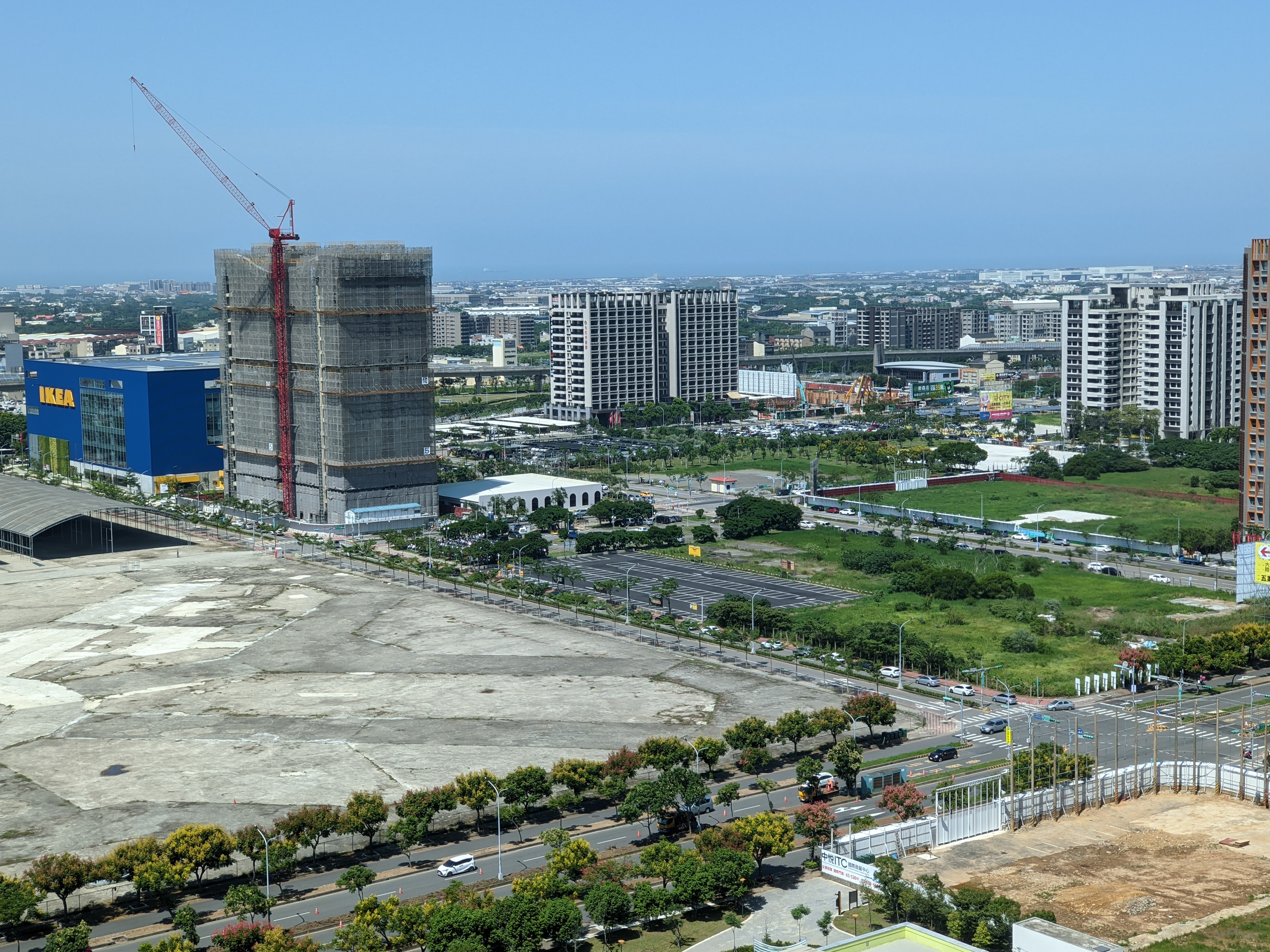

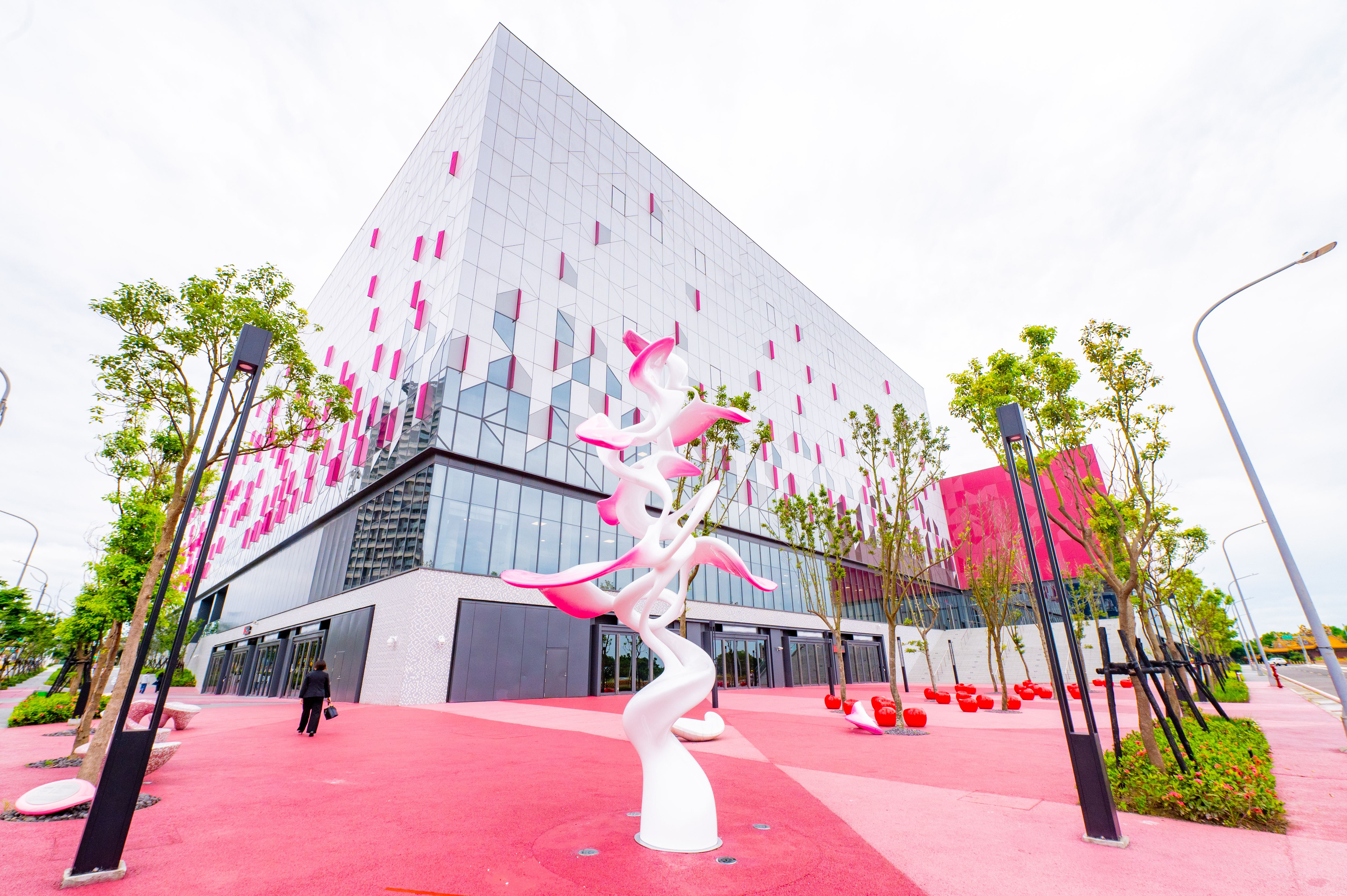
Taoyuan Convention and Exhibition Center

== See also ==
- Xinyi Planning District
- Xinban Special District
- Xinzhuang Sub-city Center
- Taoyuan Zhongzheng Arts and Cultural Business District
- Urban planning in Taiwan
- Taoyuan Aerotropolis
