= Qingpu =

Qingpu may refer to:

- Qingpu (青埔), Zhongli District, Taoyuan, Taiwan
- Qingpu, Shanghai, China
- Qingpu District, Huai'an, Jiangsu province, China
- Qingpu Line
- Qingpu Prison
- Qingpu Special District, Zhongli District and Dayuan District, Taoyuan, Taiwan

== See also ==
- Qingpu station (disambiguation)
