= Taoyuan International Airport Corporation =

Republic of China government corporation

Taoyuan International Airport Corporation 桃園國際機場股份有限公司
- Industry: Transportation
- Founded: November 1, 2010
- Headquarters: Taiwan Taoyuan International Airport, Dayuan, Taoyuan City, Republic of China,
- Key people: Tseng Dar-jen (Chairman); Hsiao Ting-ko (CEO)
- Products: Managing airports
- Owner: Ministry of Transportation and Communications (Taiwan)
- Website: www.taoyuanairport.com.tw

Taoyuan International Airport Corporation (TIAC; traditional Chinese: 桃園國際機場公司; simplified Chinese: 桃园国际机场公司; pinyin: Táoyuán Guójì Jīchǎng Gōngsī) is a government-owned corporation responsible for the management of Taiwan Taoyuan International Airport. It is a company based in Taoyuan, Taiwan, Republic of China, established on November 1, 2010.

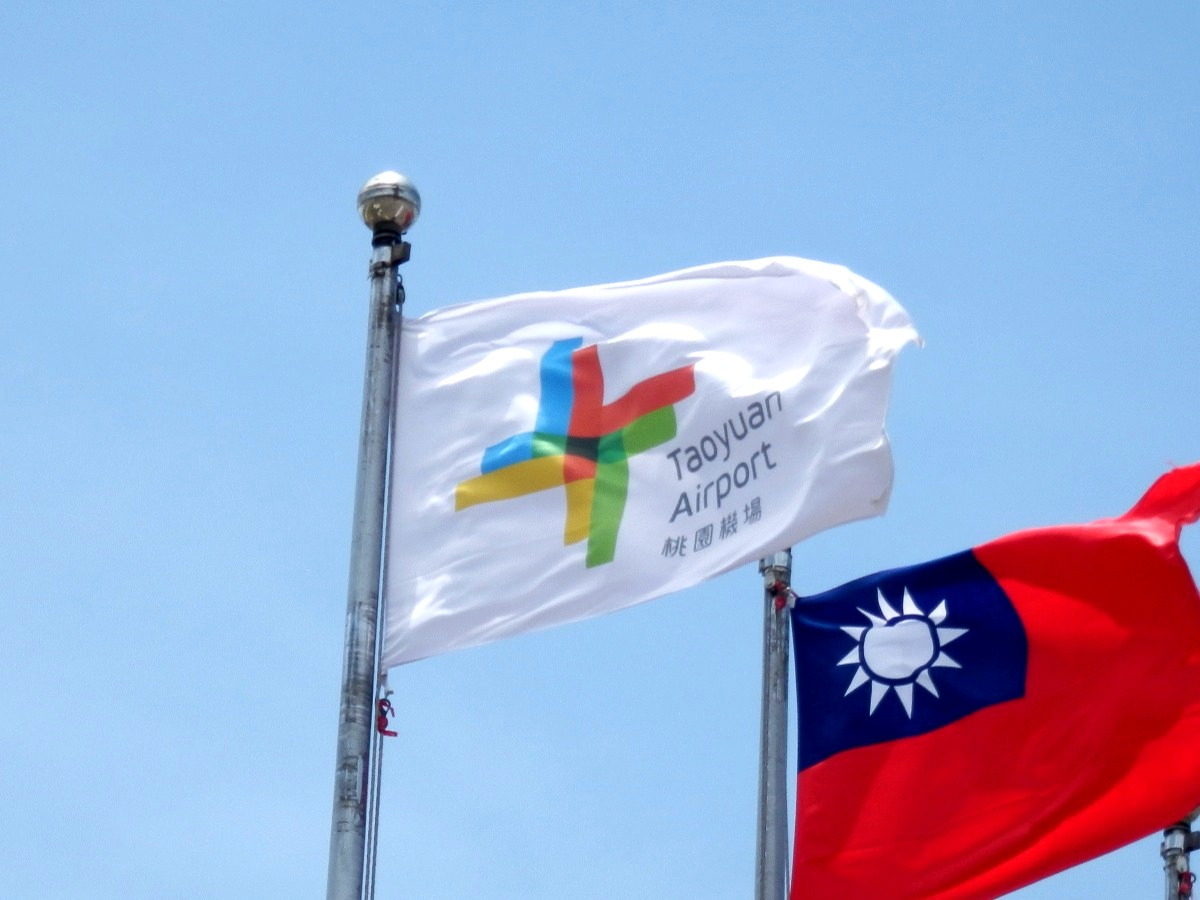
Flag of Taoyuan International Airport Corporation

== Organizational structure ==
- Operation Safety Department
- Labor Safety and Health Office
- Airside Management Department
- Business Department
- Cargo Department
- Aviation Fuel Department
- Ethics Department
- Aviation Museum
- Finance Department
- Accounting Department
- General Affairs Department
- Procurement Center
- Information Technology Department
- Human Resources Department
- Business Planning and Marketing Department
- Public Affairs Division
- Legal Affairs Division
- Maintenance Department
- Engineering Department

== Management ==
=== Chairman ===
- Samuel Lin (31 July 2015 - 7 June 2016)
- Tseng Dar-jen (8 June 2016 - 11 Oct 2018)
- Wang, Ming-The (2 Jan 2019 - )

=== Chief Executive Officers ===
- Fei Hourng-jiun (16 December 2013 - 7 June 2016)
- Hsiao Ting-ko (8 June 2016 -Jan 2 2019)

== See also ==
- Taoyuan Aerotropolis
