= Linghang =

Linghang (Chinese: 领航; pinyin: lǐngháng) may refer to:

- navigator for Chinese
- Linghang metro station, a station of the Taoyuan Airport MRT
- MG Pilot, MG HS#Facelift
