= Taoyuan Museum of Fine Arts =

Museum in Zhongli, Taoyuan City, Taiwan

- 桃園市立美術館
- Established: 2018
- Location: Zhongli, Taoyuan City, Taiwan
- Coordinates: 25°00′16.8″N 121°12′26.4″E
- Type: art museum
- Architects: JP Architects & Planners, TOPOTEK 1
- Public transit access: Taoyuan Sports Park Station
- Website: Official website

The Taoyuan Museum of Fine Arts (TMoFA; traditional Chinese: 桃園市立美術館; simplified Chinese: 桃园市立美术馆; pinyin: Táoyuán Shìlì Měishùguǎn) is an art museum in Zhongli District, Taoyuan City, Taiwan.

== History ==
The museum was established in 2018. The museum physical building is slated to be opened in 2025.

== Architecture ==
The museum building was designed by JP Architects & Planners and TOPOTEK 1. It spans over an area of 29,000 m^{2}.

== Transportation ==
The museum is accessible within walking distance northeast of Taoyuan Sports Park Station of Taoyuan Airport MRT.

== Hengshan Calligraphy Art Center ==
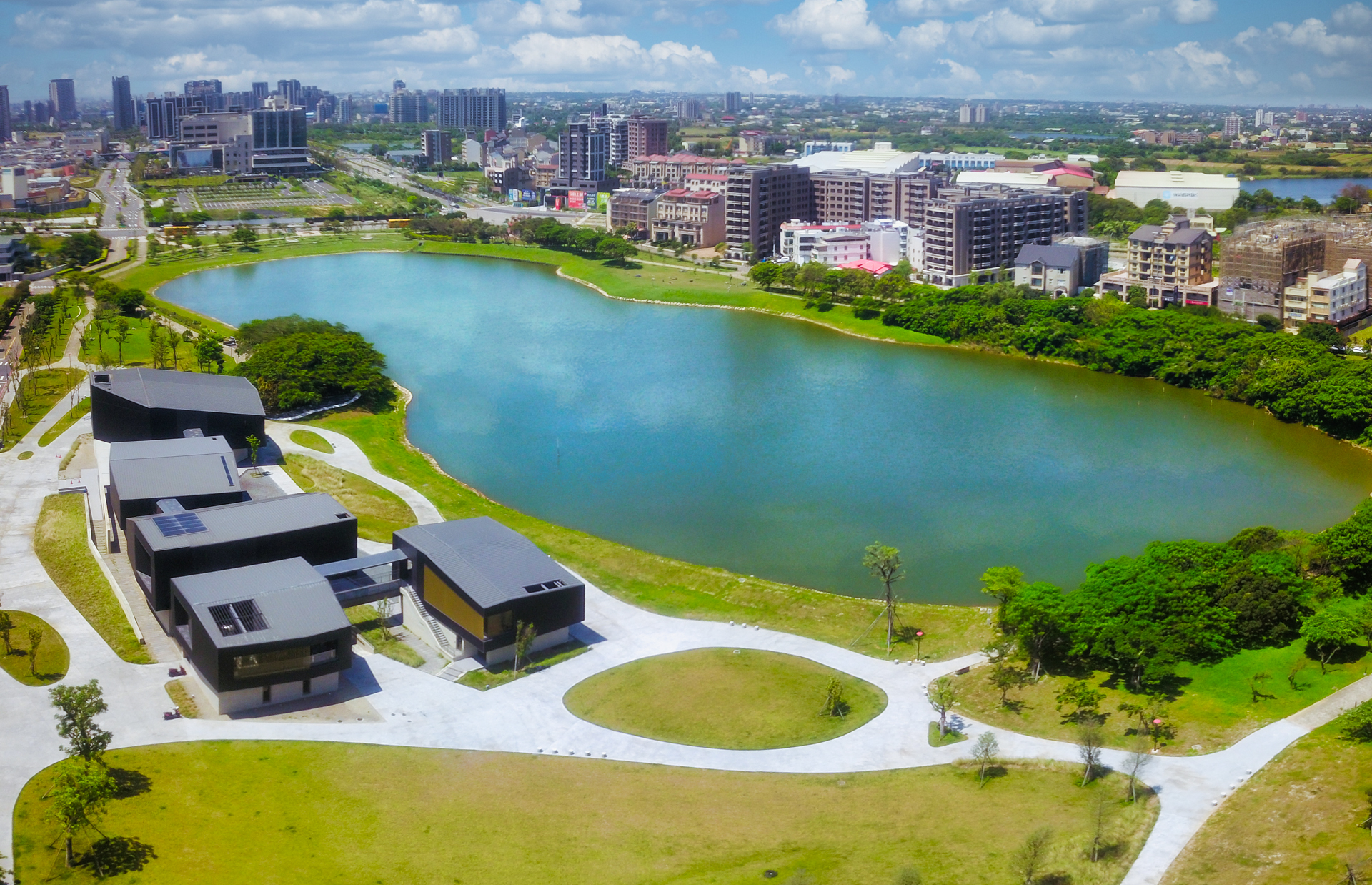
Exterior of the Art Center

The Hengshan Calligraphy Art Center (Chinese: 橫山書法藝術館; pinyin: Héngshān Shūfǎ Yìshù Guǎn) is a branch of Taoyuan Museum of Fine Arts, located in Dayuan District, Taoyuan, Taiwan. Its location is in close proximity to Linghang metro station. Construction of the art center began in September 2017 and it started trial operations on 22 October 2021.

== See also ==
- List of museums in Taiwan
