= Taoyuan Convention and Exhibition Center =

Convention center in Taoyuan, Taiwan

Taoyuan Convention and Exhibition Center 桃園會展中心
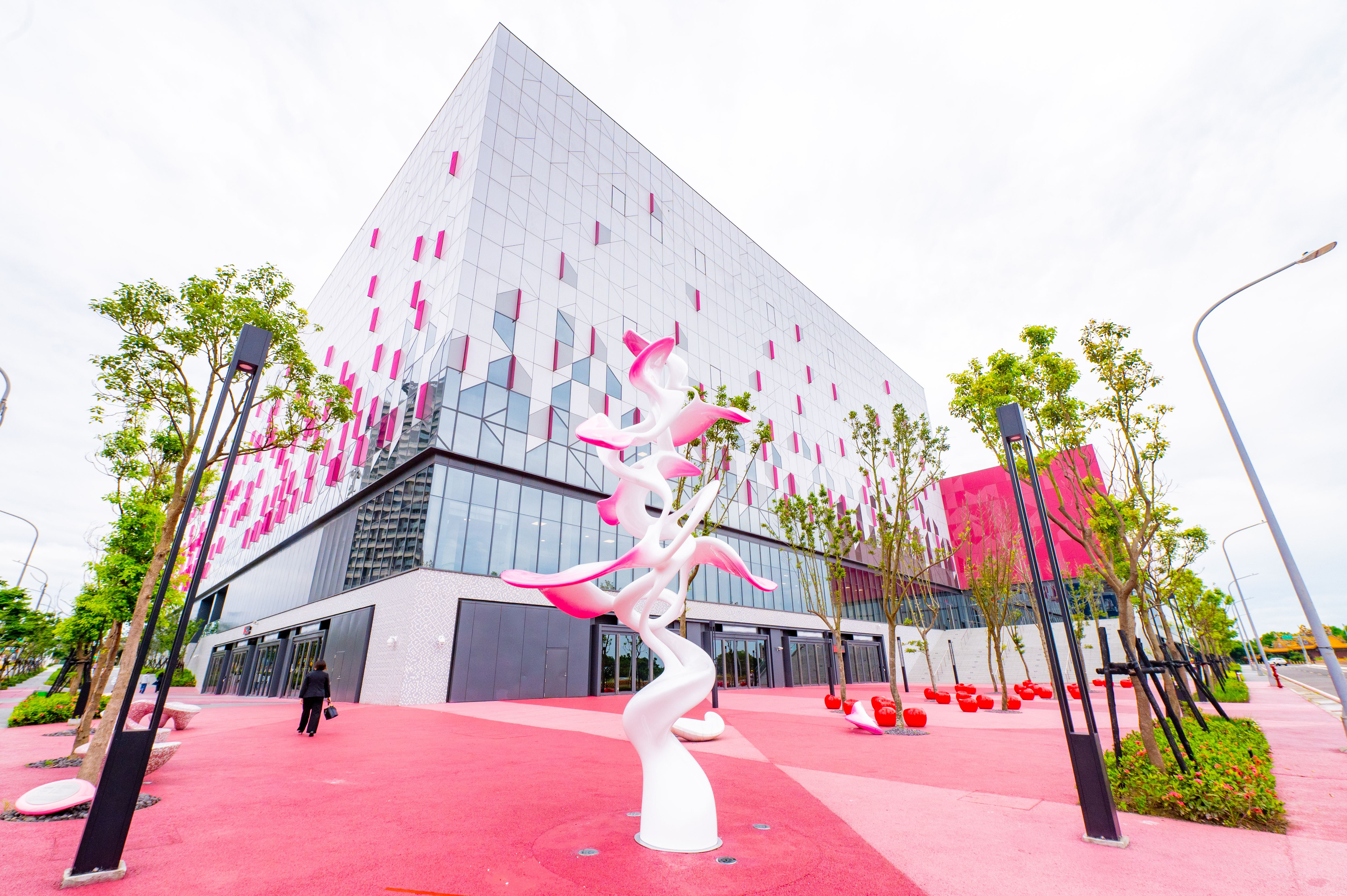
- Interactive map of Taoyuan Convention and Exhibition Center 桃園會展中心
- Location: Zhongli District, Taoyuan, Taiwan
- Coordinates: 25°0′12″N 121°12′3″E
- Owner: Taoyuan City Government
- Public transit: Taoyuan Sports Park metro station

Construction
- Built: June 4, 2024; 22 months ago
- Opened: October 2024

Website
- www.tcwtc.com.tw in (in Chinese)

The Taoyuan Convention and Exhibition Center (Chinese: 桃園會展中心; pinyin: Táoyúan Hùizhǎn Zhōngxīn) is a convention center in Qingpu Special District, Taoyuan, Taiwan. The convention center was completed on 4 June 2024 and opened in October 2024.

== Facilities ==
The exhibition hall covers 2.87 hectares with extensive exhibit and meeting spaces. It includes 10,168 m^{2} (109,450 sq ft) of exhibit space and 11,467 m^{2} (123,430 sq ft) of meeting space, featuring a 3,302 m^{2} (35,540 sq ft) ballroom. The column-free exhibit hall can accommodate up to 5,000 people and can be divided into various sizes for different types of events. The center, developed by the Taoyuan City Government and the Ministry of Economic Affairs, cost approximately NT$4.66 billion.

== Architecture ==
Designed with a peach blossom forest theme, reflecting the name Taoyuan ("peach garden"), the center features a one-story basement and seven stories above ground. It includes conference rooms of various capacities, multifunctional public spaces, an exhibition hall for 600 booths, and a shopping area with ample parking for cars and motorcycles. The outdoor space serves as a stage and public rest area, making the center a versatile venue for exhibitions, cultural displays, conferences, and shopping events.

== Transportation ==
The hall is within walking distance northwest of the Taoyuan Sports Park metro station of Taoyuan Metro.

== See also ==
- List of convention centers in Taiwan
- List of tourist attractions in Taiwan
