= Hengshan Calligraphy Art Center =

Arts center in Dayuan District, Taoyuan City, Taiwan

- 橫山書法藝術館
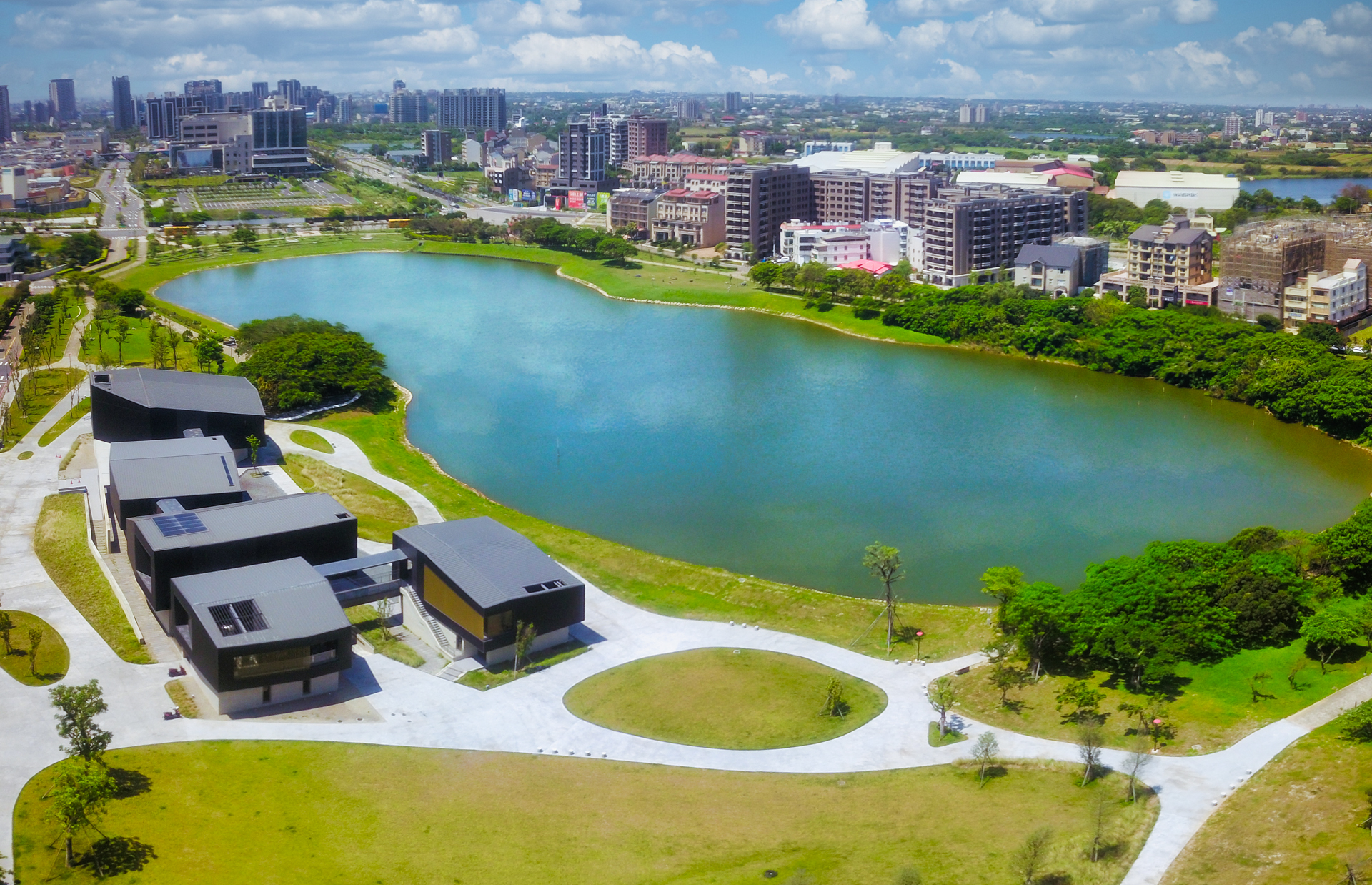
- Exterior of the Art Center
- Interactive map of the Hengshan Calligraphy Art Center area

General information
- Type: arts centre
- Location: No.100, Daren Road, Dayuan District, Taoyuan City, Taiwan
- Coordinates: 25.021021313514108°N 121.21842815522918°E

Website
- Official website

The Hengshan Calligraphy Art Center (Chinese: 橫山書法藝術館; pinyin: Héngshān Shūfǎ Yìshù Guǎn) is a branch of Taoyuan Museum of Fine Arts, located in Dayuan District, Taoyuan, Taiwan. Its location is in close proximity to Linghang metro station. Construction of the art center began in September 2017 and it started trial operations on 22 October 2021.

== Facilities ==
The Hengshan Calligraphy Art Museum is a two-story building with a floor area of about 3,000 m^{2} (32,000 sq ft). It is the first official art museum in Taiwan with the theme of calligraphy. The architect is Tianyi Pan. The design of the pavilion area is based on the imagery of the park as the inkstone and the pond as the inkwell. The exterior of the building is in the form of seals, consisting of five square boxes from left to right.

== See also ==
- List of tourist attractions in Taiwan
