= Qingpu Station =

Qingpu (Chinese: 青埔; pinyin: Qīngpǔ) station may refer to the following stations in Taiwan:

- Cingpu metro station, a light rail station of the Danhai light rail
- Taoyuan HSR station, a high-speed rail station, also known as Qingpu Station

== See also ==
- Qingpu Xincheng station, a metro station of Shanghai Metro
