= Asia Silicon Valley Development Plan =

Industrial project in Taoyuan City, Taiwan

Asia Silicon Valley Development Plan (Chinese: 亞洲·矽谷計畫) is a national-level mega industrial project located in Taoyuan City, Taiwan. In her inaugural address on May 20, 2016, Taiwan's President Tsai Ing-wen made a commitment to pursue a new economic model for sustainable development based on the core values of innovation, employment, and equitable distribution.

To realize President Tsai's commitment, the Taiwanese Government is currently building a new economic model by focusing on an Asian Silicon Valley Development Plan and four innovative industries, namely, smart machinery, green energy, biotech and pharmaceuticals, and national defense. By developing these sectors, Taiwan expects to become an innovative startup destination for young Asians and a model of innovation and entrepreneurship, and eventually achieve its vision by becoming a digital nation and smart island.

== History ==
=== Proposal ===
The Asian Silicon Valley Project was proposed by Tsai Ing-wen, a presidential candidate of the Democratic Progressive Party, on October 1, 2015. She pointed out that the Asian Silicon Valley Project should focus on two major axes: "facing the local" and "facing the world." For the local part, "If we combine it with Silicon Valley's R&D energy, and add Silicon Valley's technology, capital, and talent, a highly innovative, world-class supply chain will be formed." For the international part, she advocated starting the Taoyuan, Taiwan An "Asia Innovation R&D Talent Exchange Center" has been constructed around the international airport. On May 7, 2016, Vice President Chen Chien-jen attended the "Looking Forward to Asia's Silicon Valley: Improving Taiwan's Competitiveness" summit forum and stated that Asia's Silicon Valley will be one of the demand-oriented economic models of "innovation, employment, and distribution" in the future. A very important link. In addition, he also hopes that Asia Silicon Valley will develop on the two main axes of "local orientation" and "international orientation" to lay the foundation for Taiwan's economic development in the next 20 years.

=== Site selection ===
The Asia Silicon Valley project was located in Taoyuan City when the policy was announced. Democratic Progressive Party presidential candidate Tsai Ing-wen said on October 1, 2015, that Taoyuan is close to the five largest cities in Asia and has 29 industrial parks, with more than 10,000 factories, is the perfect location. Kung Ming-hsin, deputy director of the Taiwan Institute of Economic Research who participated in the planning, believes that Taoyuan City's geographical location can also connect the industrial clusters in both Greater Taipei and Hsinchu City. It also has a broad hinterland and a good industrial foundation, and is also the location of Taoyuan International Airport, and the Taoyuan Aerotropolis, making Taoyuan the best place to build Asia's Silicon Valley.

== Main Developments ==
The Asia Silicon Valley Project selected three hinterland areas including approximately 3.81 hectares of land around the Taoyuan Metro Taoyuan Sports Park metro station in Zhongli District, approximately 11.45 hectares of land in the Youth Industrial Zone in Yangmei District, and approximately 2 hectares of the Bade Campus of the National Central University. This project aims to construct Taiwan to become an innovative silicon island, and is expected to create a GDP of more than NT$1 trillion for Taiwan.

== See also ==
- Taoyuan Aerotropolis
