= Global Mall Taoyuan A8 =

Shopping mall in Guishan, Taoyuan City, Taiwan

- 環球購物中心桃園A8

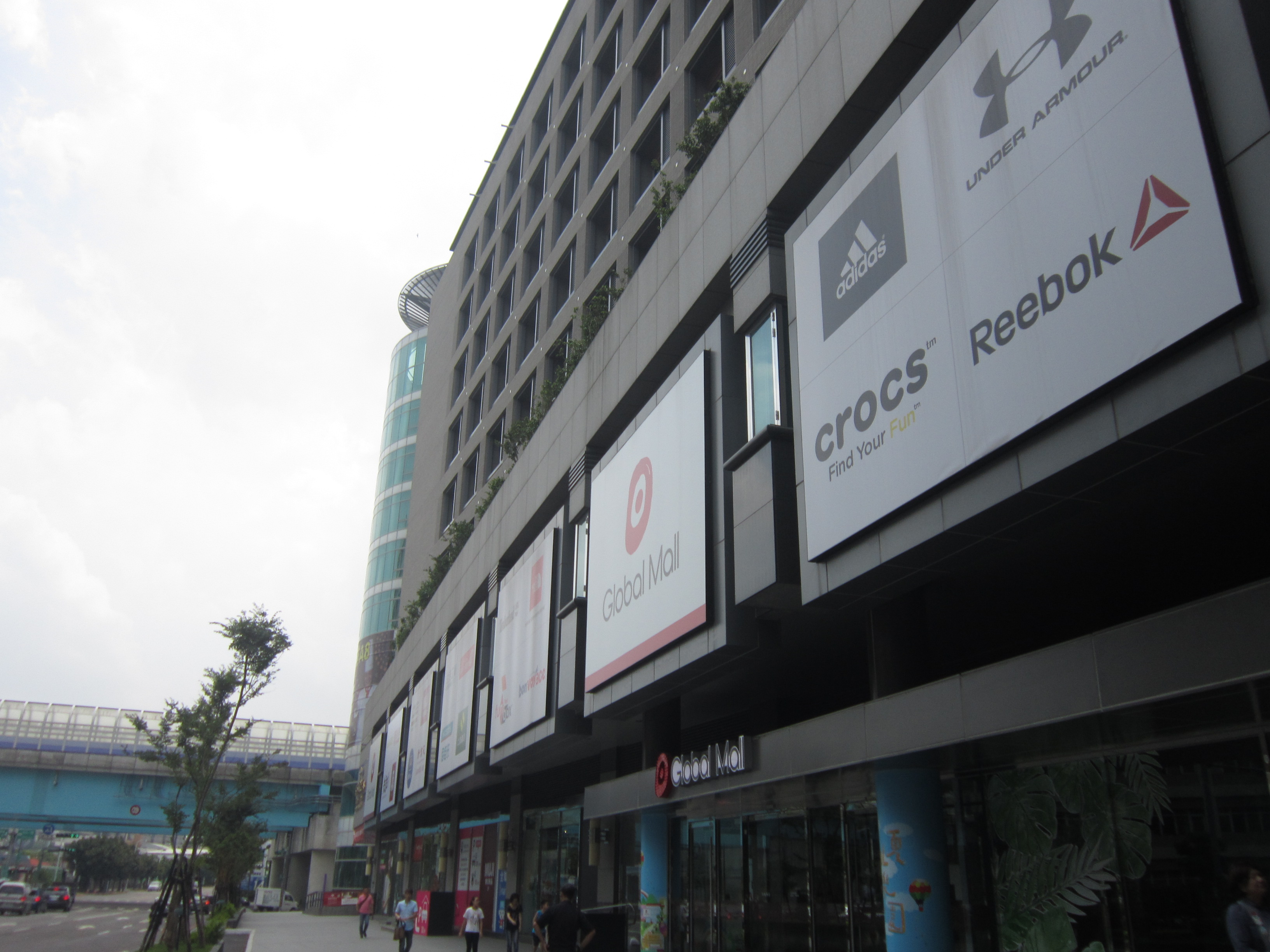
- Location: No. 8, Fuxing 1st Road, Guishan District, Taoyuan City, Taiwan
- Coordinates: 25°3′39″N 121°22′12″E
- Opened: November 2015
- Floor area: 9,300 m^{2} (100,000 sq ft)
- Floors: 2 floors above ground 1 floor below ground
- Website: https://www.twglobalmall.com/

Global Mall Taoyuan A8 (Chinese: 環球購物中心桃園A8) is a shopping mall located in Guishan District, Taoyuan City, Taiwan that opened in November 2015. With a total floor area of 9,300 m^{2} (100,000 sq ft), the mall is located inside the building that houses Chang Gung Memorial Hospital metro station.

== Facilities ==
The main operating floors are B1 to level 2, the latter floor is the main channel connecting to the metro station and Chang Gung Memorial Hospital. It offers exclusive characteristic themed restaurants, small exotic restaurants, and provide a complete rest space; on the first floor, a compound store-type store combines light meals and catering.

== See also ==
- List of tourist attractions in Taiwan
- Global Mall Taoyuan A19
- Global Mall Pingtung
