= Taoyuan HSR station =

Railway station in Taoyuan, Taiwan

Taoyuan 桃園
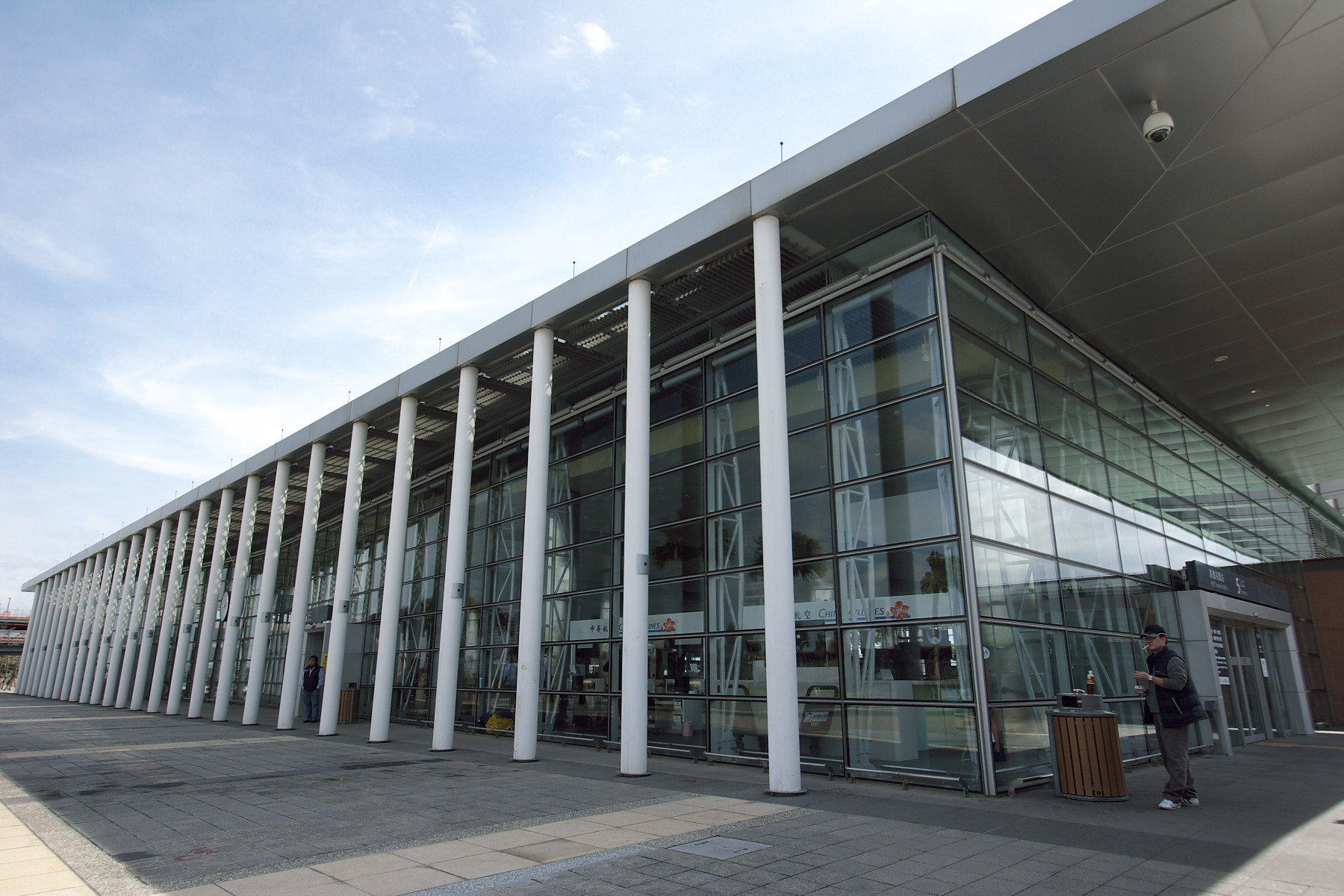
- HSR building exterior

Chinese name
- Traditional Chinese: 桃園
- Simplified Chinese: 桃园
Transcriptions
Standard Mandarin
- Hanyu Pinyin: Táoyuán
- Bopomofo: ㄊㄠˊ ㄩㄢˊ
Hakka
- Romanization: Tǒ-iěn (Sixian dialect); To-rhan (Hailu dialect)
Southern Min
- Tâi-lô: Thô-hn̂g

General information
- Location: 6 Sec 1 Gaotie N Rd; Zhongli District, Taoyuan; Taiwan
- Coordinates: 25.0132°N 121.2149°E
- System: THSR railway station
- Line: THSR
- Distance: 42.2 km
- Connections: Rapid transit; Local bus; Coach

Construction
- Structure type: Underground
- Architect: Kris Yao

Other information
- Station code: TAY／04
- Website: www.thsrc.com.tw/en/StationInfo/prospect/730b59ec-767d-490f-8a16-e4ae62e25cf8

History
- Opened: 2007-01-05

Passengers
- 2018: 12.901 million per year ▲8.38%
- Rank: 4 out of 12

Services
Preceding station	Taiwan High Speed Rail	Following station
Banqiao towards Nangang	THSR	Hsinchu towards Zuoying
Location
- Location within Taiwan

Taoyuan HSR A18 高鐵桃園站
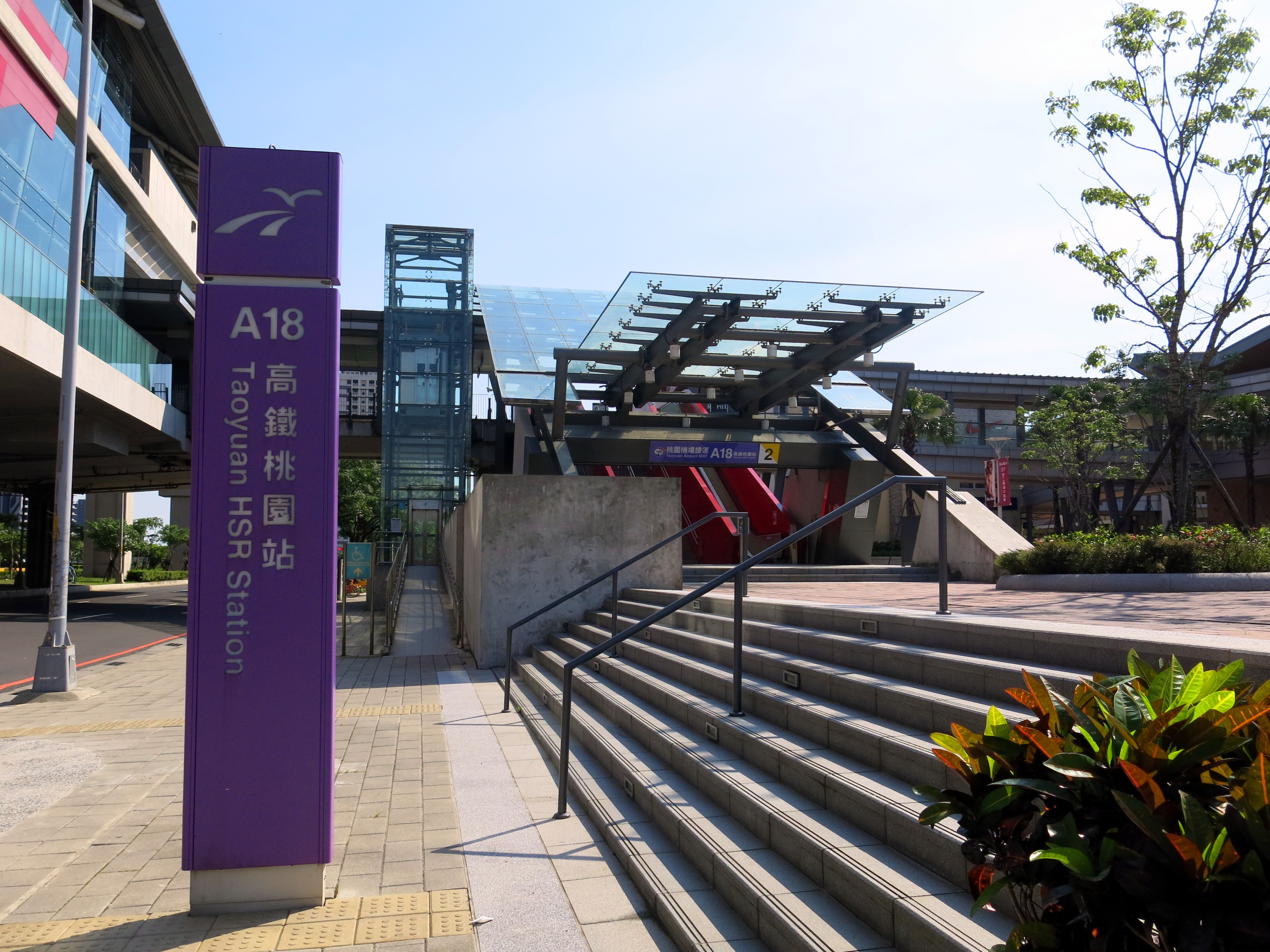
- Entrance 2

Chinese name
- Traditional Chinese: 高鐵桃園站
- Simplified Chinese: 高铁桃园站
Transcriptions
Standard Mandarin
- Hanyu Pinyin: Gāotiě Táoyuán Zhàn
- Bopomofo: ㄍㄠ ㄊ一ㄝˇ ㄊㄠˊ ㄩㄢˊ ㄓㄢˋ
Hakka
- Pha̍k-fa-sṳ: Kô-thiet Thò-yèn Chhàm
Southern Min
- Hokkien POJ: Ko-thih Thô-hn̂g Chām

General information
- Location: 5 Sec 1 Gaotie N Rd; Zhongli District, Taoyuan; Taiwan
- System: Taoyuan metro station
- Line: Taoyuan Airport MRT – Commuter
- Distance: 108.7 km
- Platforms: 2 side platforms
- Tracks: 2

Construction
- Structure type: Elevated

Other information
- Station code: A18
- Website: www.tymetro.com.tw/tymetro-new/en/_pages/travel-guide/A18

History
- Opened: 2017-03-02

Passengers
- Aug 2025: 23,231 (entries and exits, daily)
- Rank: 3/22

Services
Preceding station	Taoyuan Metro	Following station
Linghang towards Taipei Main Station	Taoyuan Airport MRT Commuter	Taoyuan Sports Park towards Laojie River
Airport Terminal 2 towards Taipei Main Station	Taoyuan Airport MRT Express	Huanbei Terminus
Location

Taoyuan HSR (Chinese: 高鐵桃園站; pinyin: Gāotiě Táoyuán Zhàn) is a high-speed rail and metro station in Zhongli District, Taoyuan, Taiwan, served by Taiwan High Speed Rail and Taoyuan Airport MRT, and is also known as Qingpu Station (青埔車站).

== History ==
On 10 November 2006, this station opened for service.

On 5 January 2007, the segment from the Banqiao to Zuoying opened for service and trains began stopping at this station.

On 2 March 2017, the Taoyuan Airport MRT opened for service connecting the station to the now completed Taoyuan Metro line.

The Taiwan High Speed Rail Corporation signed contracts with China Airlines for preferential services at this station for the airline's outbound passengers.

== HSR station layout ==
The Taiwan High Speed Rail section of the station is underground with two side platforms. Prior to the abolition of Taoyuan Air Force Base, Taoyuan Air Force Base had set an altitude limit for the construction of Taiwan High Speed Rail, which is why the high-speed rail station is underground.

Prior to the opening of Taiwan High Speed Rail, the area this station is located in, Qingpu, was very deserted and distant from Central Taoyuan. This has begun to change after the opening of Taiwan High Speed Rail, with major developments such as the opening of a new outlet mall, an IKEA store, and an indoor aquarium. Twenty-two hectares around the station are reserved for commercial and industrial development, with the goal of developing the area into an international commercial city.

Street level	Lobby	Entrance/exit, ticketing, automatic ticket machines, restrooms, information desk Tourism counter, retail stores Parking lot, transfers, taxi stand, drop-off area

B1	Concourse	Waiting area, nursery, retail stores
B2
B2	Side platform
B2	Platform 1	THSR toward Zuoying (Hsinchu)
B2	Passing track	Southbound train passing track
B2	Passing track	Northbound train passing track
B2	Platform 2	THSR toward Nangang (Banqiao)
B2	Side platform

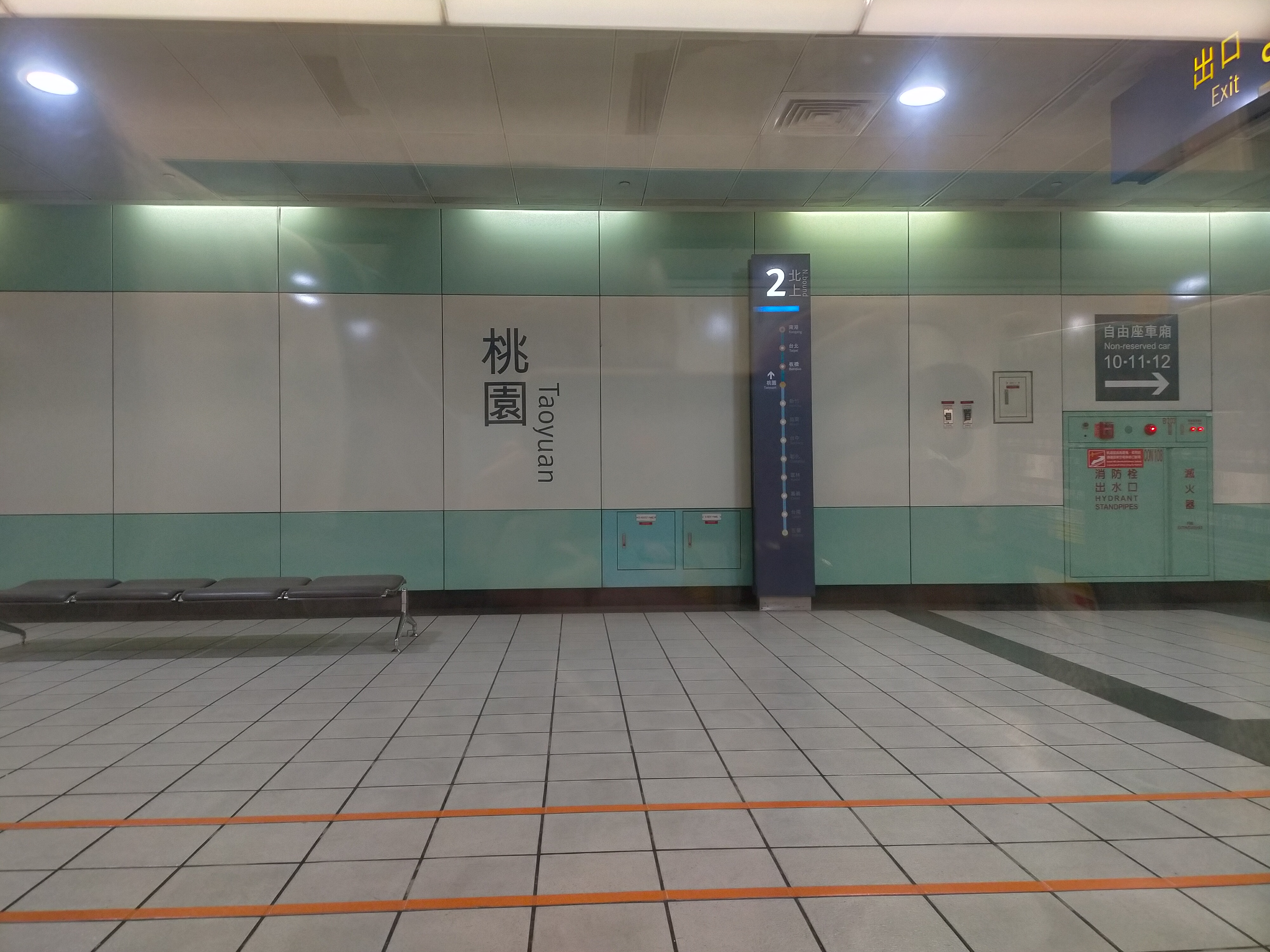
Taoyuan HSR station northbound route map

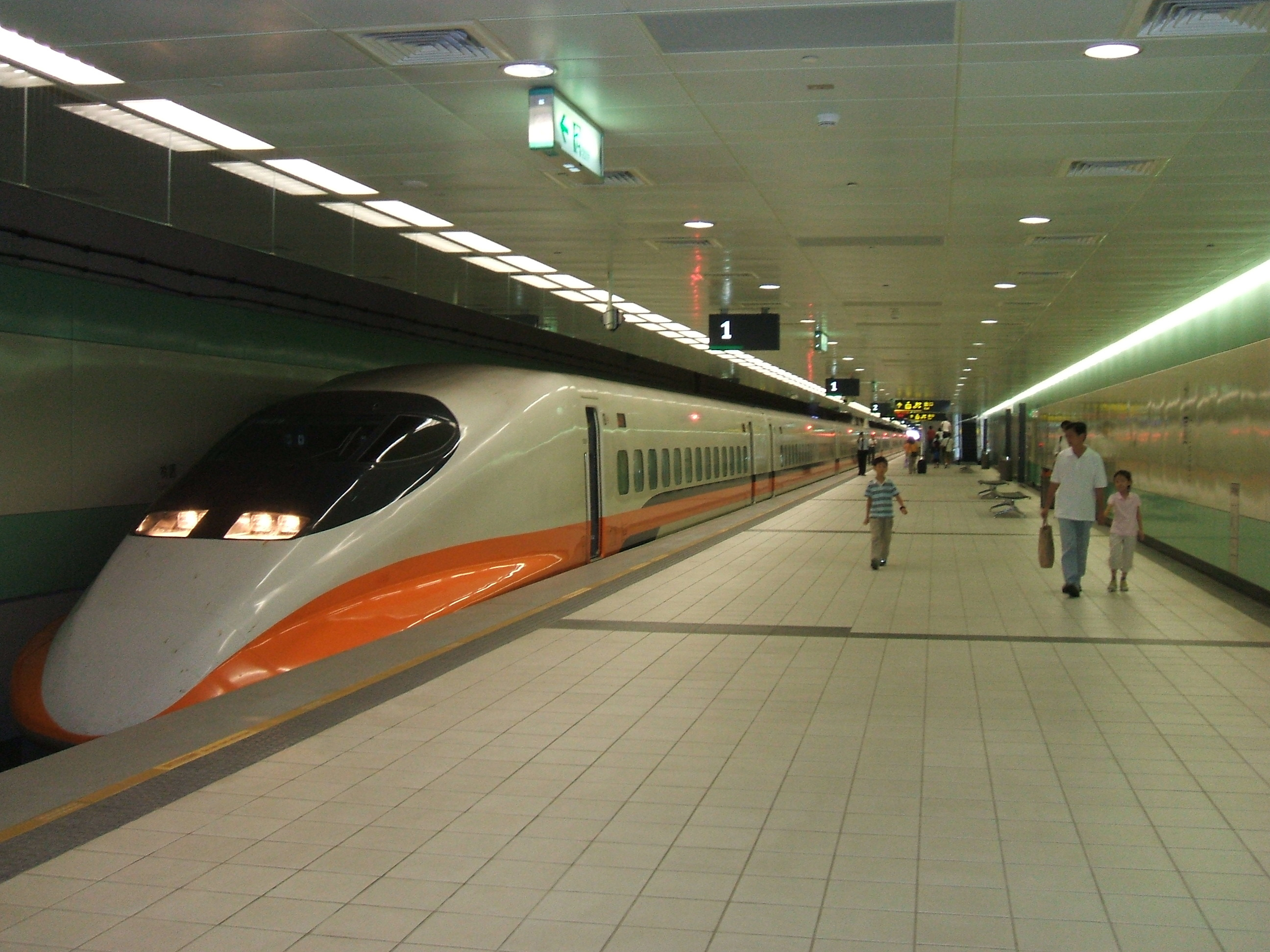
THSR Taoyuan Station platform

== Taoyuan Airport MRT station layout ==
The Taoyuan Airport MRT section of the station is elevated with two side platforms.

3F
3F	Side platform, doors will open on the right
3F	Platform 1	← Airport MRT toward Laojie River (Taoyuan Sports Park)
3F	Platform 2	→ Airport MRT toward Taiwan Taoyuan International Airport and Taipei (Linghang) →
3F	Side platform, doors will open on the right

2F
2F	Station lobby	Station lobby, information center, restrooms
2F	Lobby	Ticket machines, station faregates Escalators, elevators and stairs toward entrance/exit, Gloria Outlets, Taoyuan HSR station B1

Street level
Street level	Entrance/exit

== HSR services ==
HSR services 295, (1)3xx, (1)5xx, (Note: Except 583 and 598) (1)6xx, and 8xx call at this station.

== Around the station ==
- National Central University
- Ching Yun University
- Vanung University
- Taiwan Taoyuan International Airport (17 minutes by MRT)
- National Highway No. 2 Dazhu Interchange
- Metro Walk Mall
- Liqingpu Elementary School
- Taoyuan International Baseball Stadium
- Taiwan High Speed Rail Museum
