= Samuel J. Lin =

American plastic surgeon

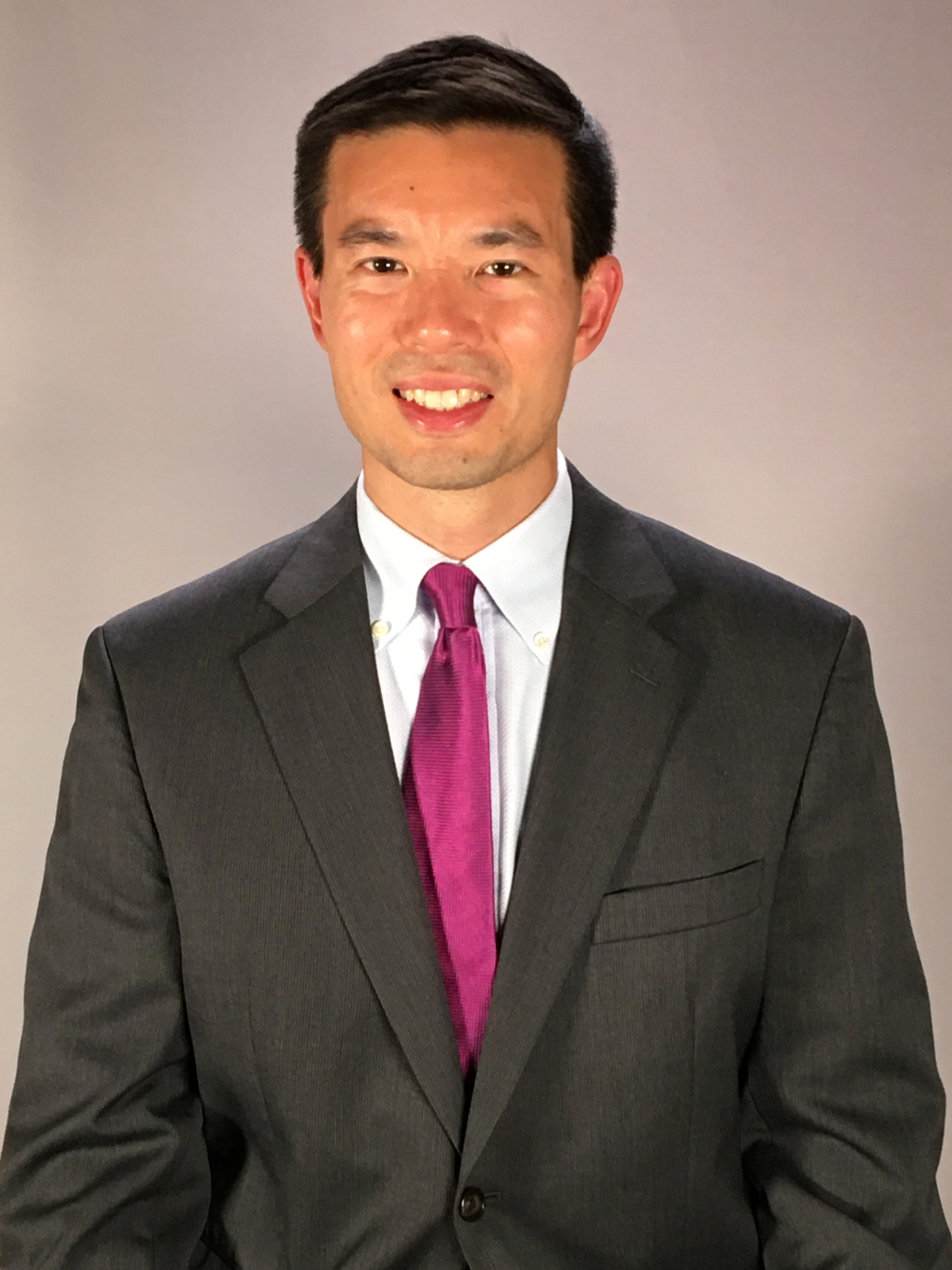
- Education: Northwestern University; University of Texas
- Scientific career
- Workplaces: Harvard Medical School
- Website: www.linplasticsurgery.com

Samuel J. Lin is an associate professor of surgery at Harvard Medical School and a plastic surgeon at Beth Israel Deaconess Medical Center. He is also the program director for the BIDMC/Harvard Plastic Surgery Residency Training Program and Co-Fellowship Director for the Aesthetic and Reconstructive Fellowship Program.

== Education and career ==
He spent his primary schooling years in Pittsburgh, and attended Upper St. Clair High School. Samuel Lin received his bachelor's degree in biomedical engineering and M.D. from Northwestern University and Northwestern University Feinberg School of Medicine, Chicago, Illinois. Samuel Lin is an associate professor of surgery at Harvard Medical School and a plastic surgeon at Beth Israel Deaconess Medical Center. He also has staff privileges at Massachusetts Eye and Ear Infirmary. Samuel Lin is also the program director at BIDMC Harvard Plastic Surgery Residency Training Program. He completed a Masters of Business Administration at the Sloan School of Management at the Massachusetts Institute of Technology (MIT). He also worked as a Project Advisor for Mentored Clinical Casebook Project at Harvard Medical School.

Samuel Lin is a Susan G. Komen for the Cure and Bright Pink Foundations board member. He was awarded the Mentoring Award by Harvard Medical School for his commitment to mentoring medical students, residents and fellows at the Beth Israel Deaconess Medical Center.
