= Chung Cheng Aviation Museum =

Former museum in Taoyuan County, Taiwan

Coordinates: 25°04′13″N 121°13′26″E

- 中正航空科學館
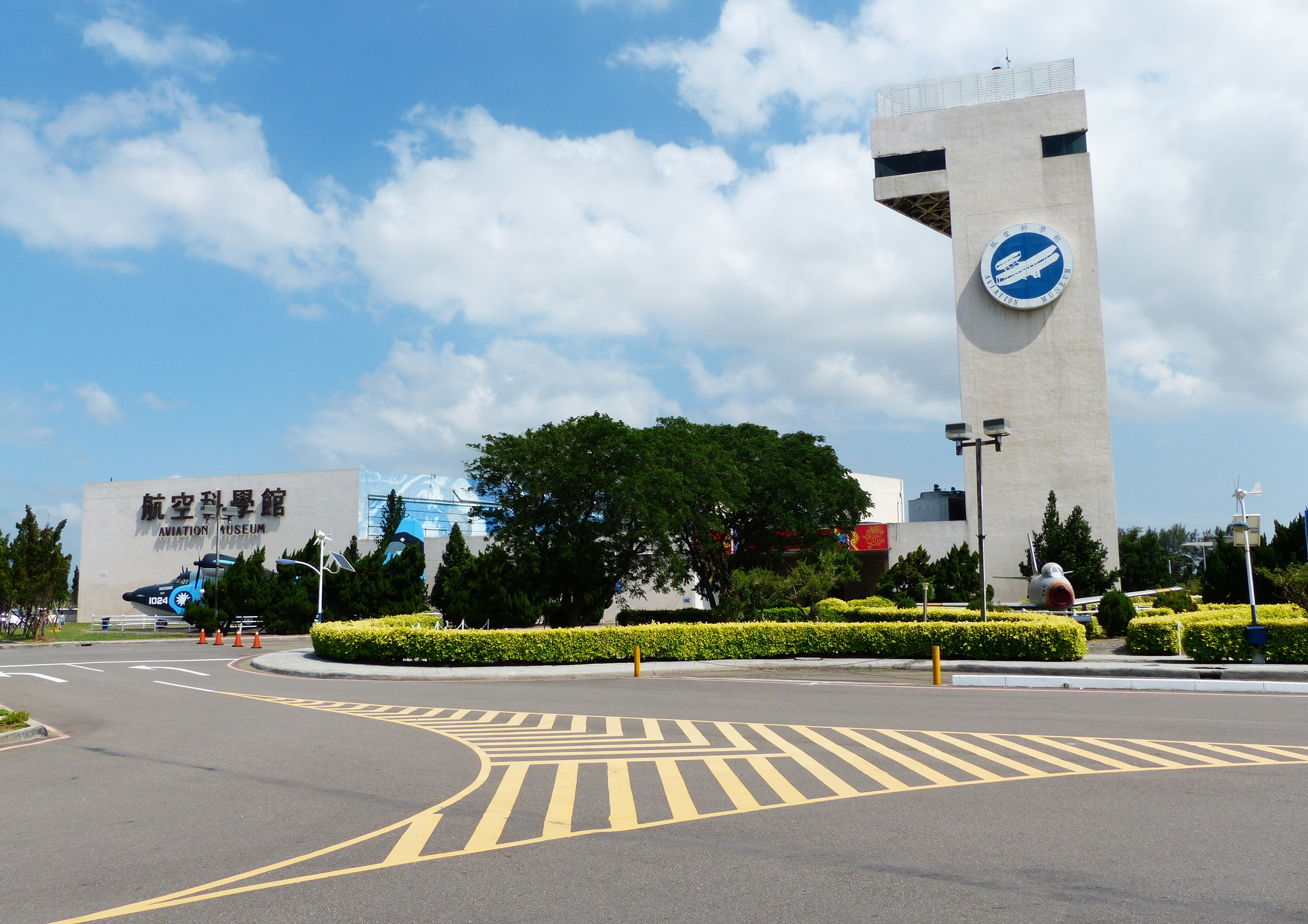
- Established: October 31, 1981
- Dissolved: March 31, 2014
- Location: Dayuan, Taoyuan, Taiwan
- Type: Aviation

The Chung Cheng Aviation Museum (Chinese: 中正航空科學館; pinyin: Zhōngzhèng Hángkōng Kēxuéguǎn) was an aviation museum located at Taiwan Taoyuan International Airport in Dayuan Township, Taoyuan County (now Dayuan District, Taoyuan City), Taiwan. The museum closed on March 31, 2014, to allow for planned construction of Terminal 3 at Taiwan Taoyuan International Airport and for relocation of taxiway WC. Items displayed at the museum have been sent to storage and all 18 aircraft on display were relocated Taoyuan Naval Base during the second half of 2014.

The museum was located in the southeastern area of the airport between the main freeway entrance and the airport terminals. It was built in 1981 by Boeing under a Civil Aeronautics Administration contract.

Many retired Republic of China Air Force fighters were represented in the museum.

== Aircraft ==
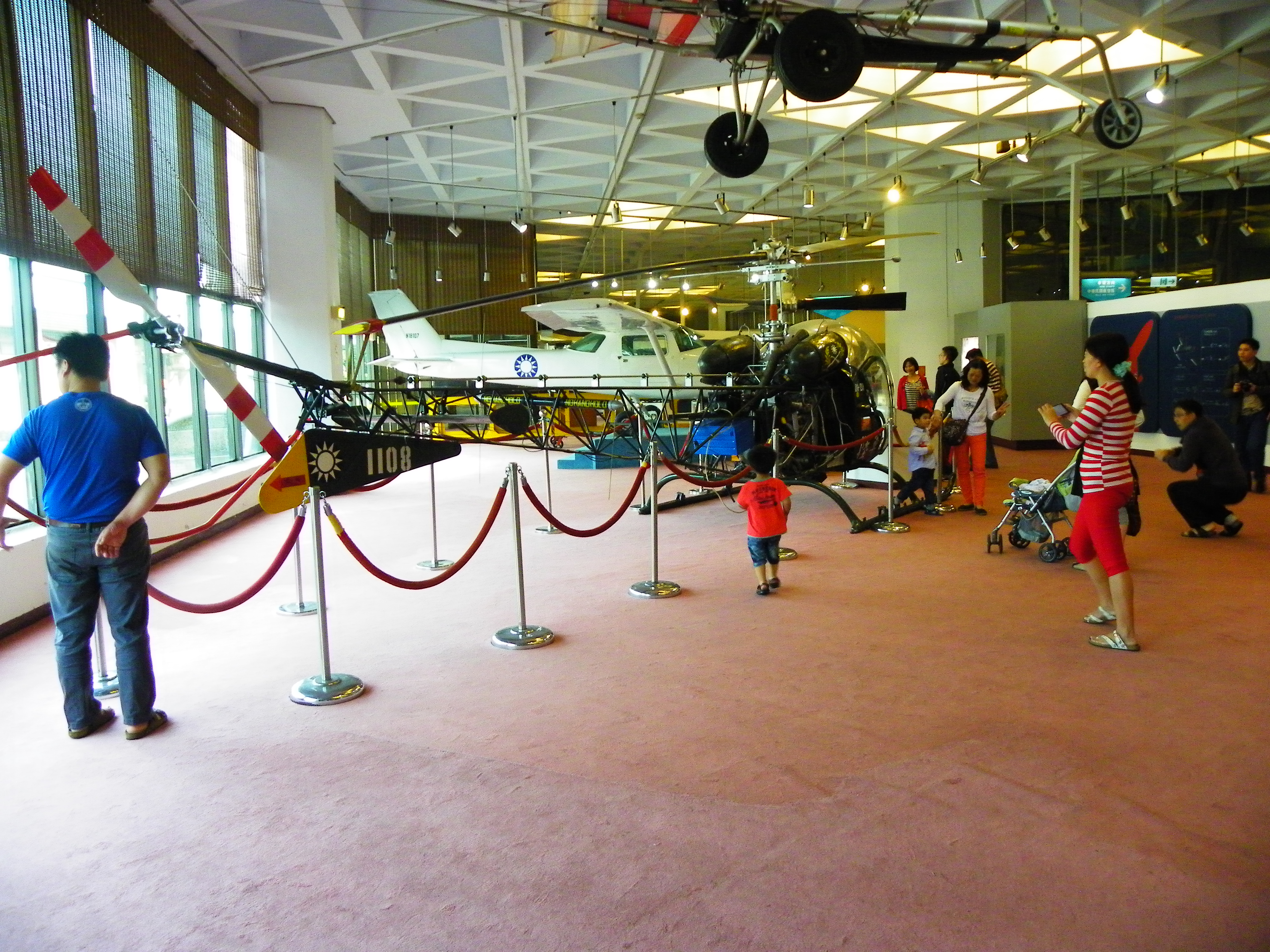
Museum interior exhibitions

- Grumman HU-16 Albatross
- North American T-28 Trojan
- Grumman S-2 Tracker
- North American F-86 Sabre
- Douglas DC-3
- McDonnell F-101 Voodoo
- North American F-100 Super Sabre
- Lockheed F-104 Starfighter
- Lockheed T-33 Shooting Star
- Northrop F-5

== See also ==
- List of aerospace museums
- List of museums in Taiwan
- Taoyuan Aerotropolis
