= Global Mall Taoyuan A19 =

- 環球購物中心桃園A19

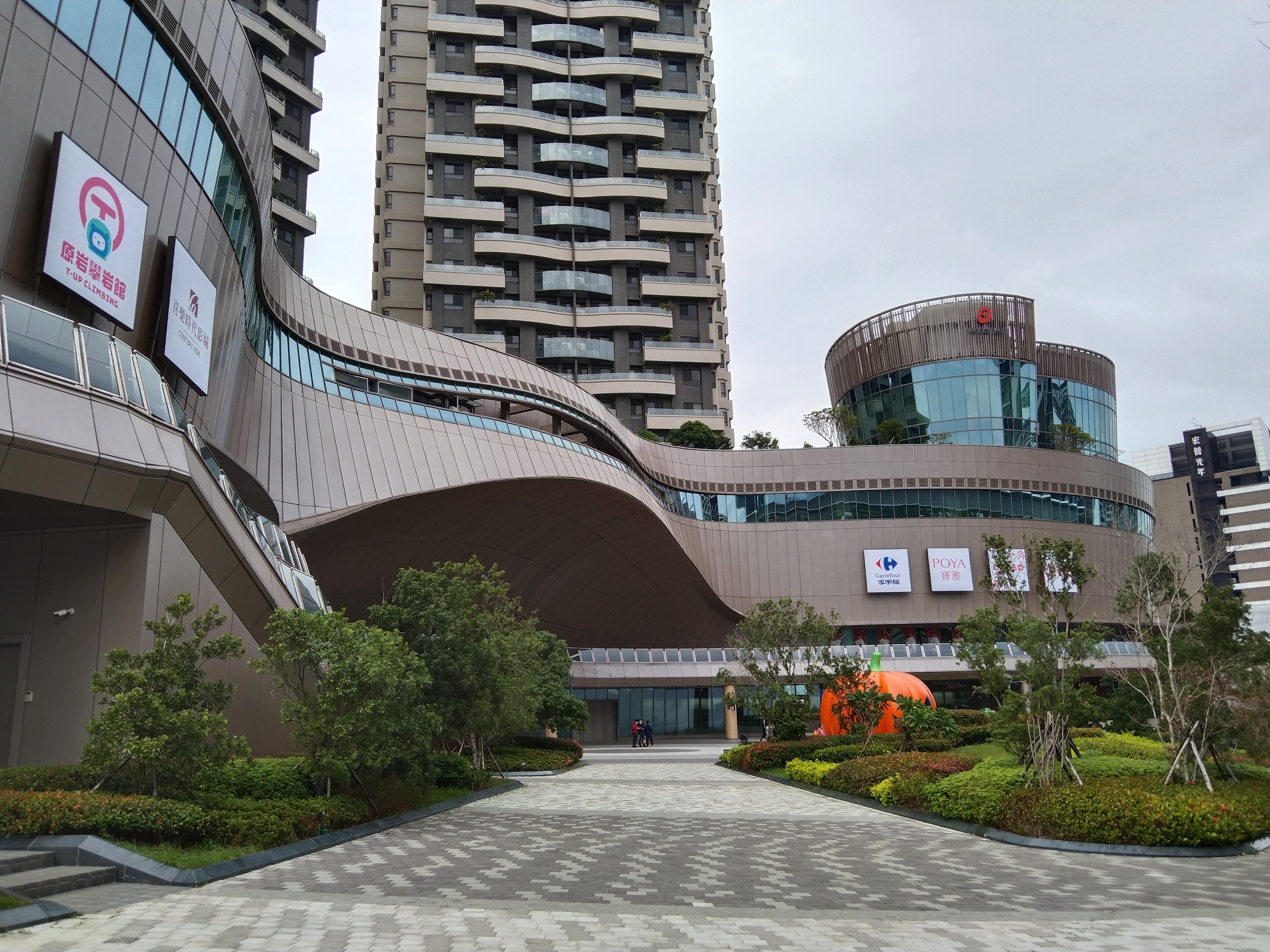
- Location: No. 352, Section 2, Gaotie South Road, Zhongli District, Taoyuan City, Taiwan
- Coordinates: 25.002122835966095°N 121.2024422975567°E
- Opened: September 30, 2021
- Floor area: 24,000 m^{2} (260,000 sq ft)
- Floors: 7 floors above ground 1 floor below ground
- Public transit: Taoyuan Sports Park metro station
- Website: https://www.twglobalmall.com/

Global Mall Taoyuan A19 (Chinese: 環球購物中心桃園A19) is a shopping mall located in Zhongli District, Taoyuan City, Taiwan that opened on September 30, 2021. With a total floor area of 24,000 m^{2} (260,000 sq ft), the mall occupies level B1 to 7 of a highrise MRT joint development complex owned by Guande Group, where levels 8 and above are serviced apartments. The entertainment facilities of the mall will include a large rock climbing facility as well as ice skating rinks. The main core stores of the mall include Century Asia Cinemas, Crocs, Hang Ten, Roots, Daiso, Carrefour and various themed restaurants. The mall is located near Taoyuan Sports Park metro station on the Taoyuan Metro and will be the eighth store of Global Mall.

== See also ==
- List of tourist attractions in Taiwan
- Global Mall Linkou A9
- Global Mall Taoyuan A8
