= Taoyuan Aerotropolis =

Planned city in Taiwan

Coordinates: 25°4′35″N 121°13′26″E

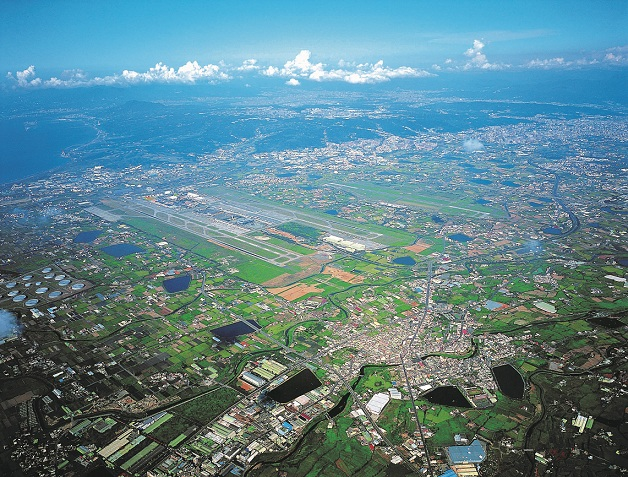
Aerial view of the planned location of Taoyuan Aerotropolis, including Taoyuan International Airport, in 2014.

Taoyuan Aerotropolis (Chinese: 桃園航空城; pinyin: Táoyuán Hángkōng Chéng) is a large urban planning development at the Taiwan Taoyuan International Airport in Taoyuan City, Taiwan.

The 4,500 hectare development, centered around the existing airport, will include a districts for transportation, logistics, industry, and residential development, and has been called "one of Taiwan’s largest national infrastructure projects ever." The Aerotropolis is expected to create 200,000-300,000 new jobs, generate annual revenues of NT$2.3 trillion (US$75.4 billion), and accommodate 4.5 million tons of container cargo a year.

The development may require the acquisition of up to 3,200 hectares (7,900 acres) of land and the relocation of over 40,000 people.

== Baseball team ==
The Taoyuan Aerotropolis baseball team (Chinese: 桃園航空城棒球隊) is a semi-professional baseball team founded in March 2009. The team is currently part of the Popcorn League.

== Future developments ==
A third runway and terminal will be added to Taiwan Taoyuan International Airport, boosting the capacity of the airport from 40 million to over 60 million passengers by 2025. Previously approved during the administration of Ma Ying-jeou, the Aerotropolis project proved to be controversial, "due to allegations of forced relocations, the prospect of added pollution, and insinuations of irregularities in land acquisition."

The Taoyuan City Mayor Cheng Wen-tsan, serving since 2014, has promised that the current, revamped version of the project will be developed according to five principles:

1. Public Transparency
2. Democratic Participation
3. Eco Development
4. Public Interest
5. Introduction of Industries

It will also strive to deliver low energy consumption, low pollution, and low water usage, along with high added value—guidelines that the mayor has dubbed "three lows and one high"—which will help resolve problems left from the Ma administration's approach to development.

Taoyuan Aerotropolis Project plans to construct a large-scale industry zone, free-trade zone, commercial zone, and residence zone. The total development area for the first phase is approximately 2,600 hectares, among which 422 hectares are for the industry zone and 120 hectares for the free-trade zone. In 2020, part of the land for the aerotropolis will be acquired and the project will initiate the development phase. The Taoyuan Aerotropolis Project will be an important case of Taiwan’s major construction. In addition, National Tsing Hua University, National Yang Ming Chiao Tung University, and National Taiwan Ocean University are all optimistic about Taoyuan’s development outlook and chose to collaborate with Taoyuan and established biomedical research and development centres or incubators. The city government will accelerate the development speed of business investment and industry zones, realize the concept of airport economics, and share the benefits brought by the airport with citizens.

== See also ==
- Asia Silicon Valley Development Plan
- Taoyuan International Airport Corporation
- Taoyuan Airport MRT
- CAL Park
- Chung Cheng Aviation Museum
- Expansion of Heathrow Airport
