= Rakuten Taoyuan Baseball Stadium =

Multi-use stadium in Taoyuan City, Taiwan

- 樂天桃園棒球場
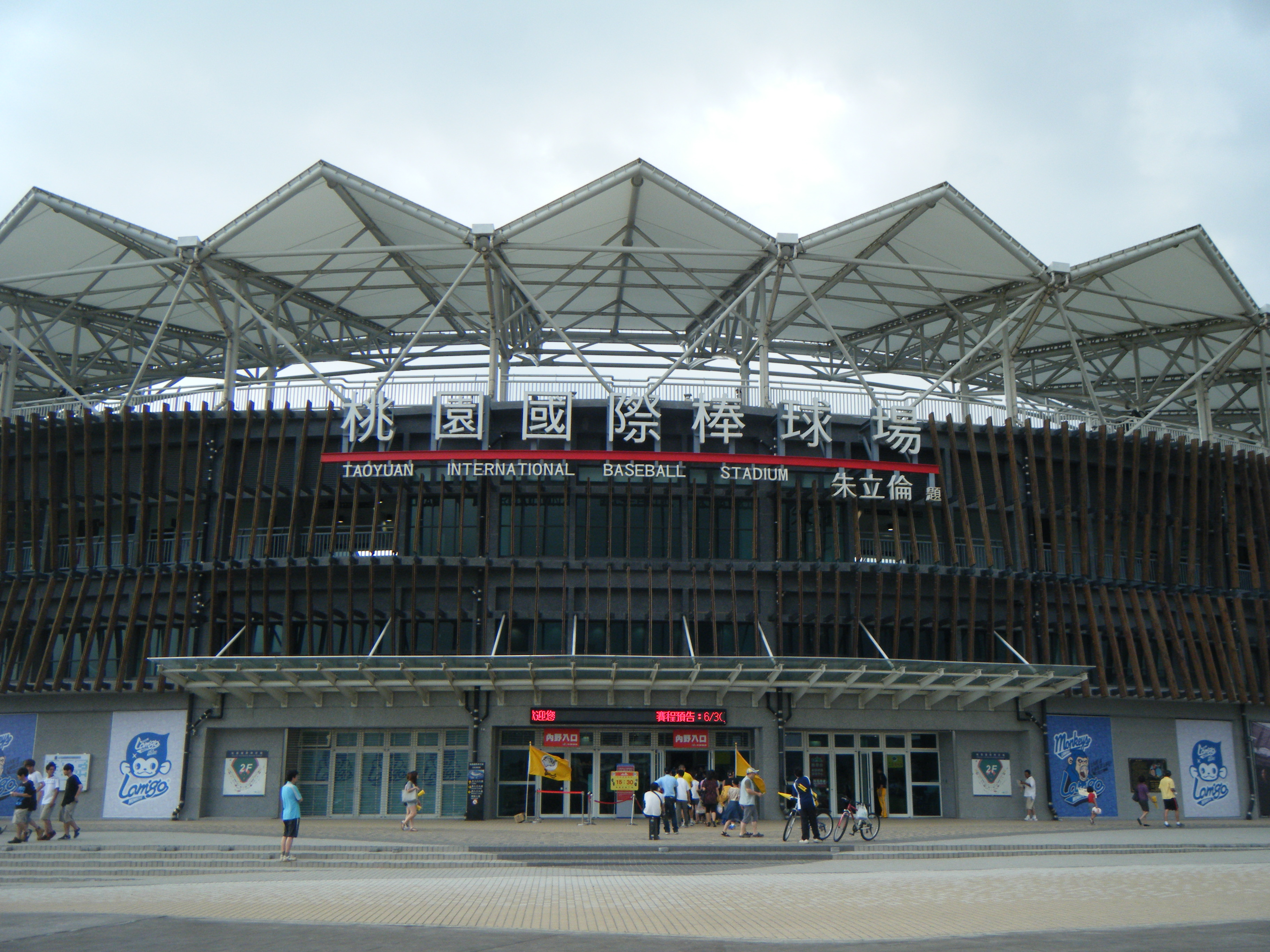
- Interactive map of Rakuten Taoyuan Baseball Stadium
- Location: Taoyuan City, Taiwan
- Coordinates: 25°00′03″N 121°12′02″E
- Capacity: 18,000
- Surface: Grass
- Field size: Left Field – 100.6 metres (330 ft); Left-Center – 116.5 metres (382 ft); Center Field – 121.9 metres (400 ft); Right-Center – 116.5 metres (382 ft); Right Field – 100.6 metres (330 ft)
- Public transit: Taoyuan Metro: Taoyuan Sports Park

Construction
- Groundbreaking: 24 December 2008
- Opened: 13 December 2009

Tenant
- Rakuten Monkeys (2011–present)

The Rakuten Taoyuan Baseball Stadium (Chinese: 樂天桃園棒球場), originally known as Taoyuan International Baseball Stadium (桃園國際棒球場) until Rakuten acquired the naming rights in 2022, is a multi-use stadium located in Taoyuan City, Taiwan. The stadium opened in 2009 and has a capacity of 20,000 spectators.

== Transportation ==
The stadium is accessible within walking distance southwest of Taoyuan Sports Park Station of Taoyuan Metro.

== See also ==
- List of stadiums in Taiwan
