= Taoyuan Sports Park metro station =

Metro station in Taoyuan City, Taiwan

Taoyuan Sports Park A19 桃園體育園區
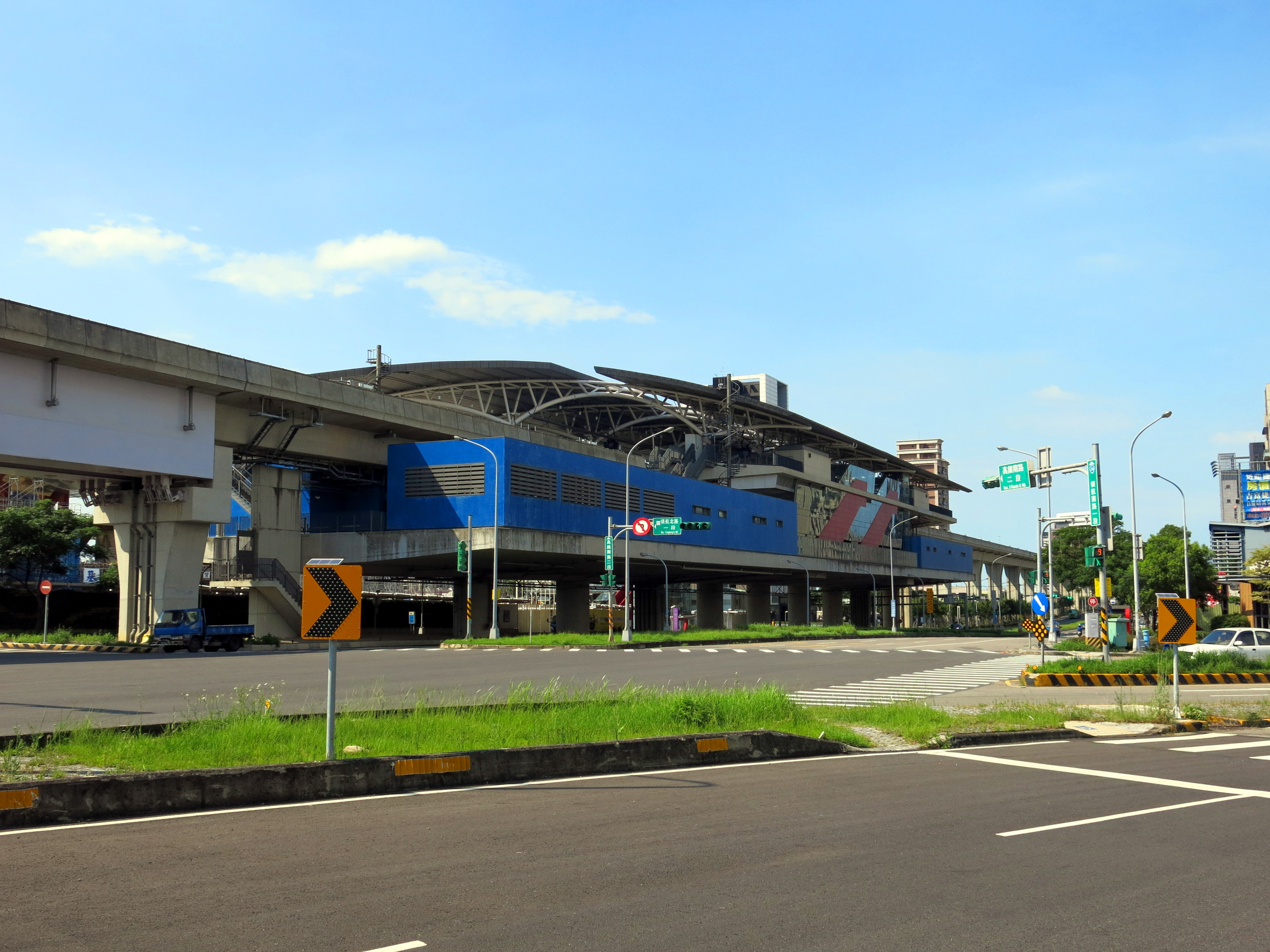

General information
- Location: 350 Sec 2 Gaotie S Rd; Zhongli, Taoyuan City; Taiwan
- Coordinates: 25°0′5.33″N 121°12′11.37″E
- Operated by: Taoyuan Metro Corporation
- Line: Taoyuan Airport MRT (A19)

Construction
- Structure type: Elevated

Other information
- Station code: A19

History
- Opened: 2017-03-02

Passengers
- Aug 2025: 4,840 (entries and exits, daily)
- Rank: 14/22

Services
Preceding station	Taoyuan Metro	Following station
Taoyuan HSR station towards Taipei Main Station	Taoyuan Airport MRT Commuter	Xingnan towards Laojie River
Taoyuan Airport MRT does not stop here
Location

Taoyuan Sports Park (Chinese: 桃園體育園區) is a station on the Taoyuan Airport MRT located in Zhongli, Taoyuan City, Taiwan. It opened for commercial service on 2 March 2017.

== Overview ==
This elevated station has two side platforms with two tracks. Only commuter trains stop at this station. The station is 148.8 metres (488 ft) long and 27 metres (89 ft) wide. It opened for trial service on February 2, 2017, and for commercial service on March 2, 2017.

Construction on the station began on September 18, 2008, and it opened for commercial service on March 2, 2017 with the opening of the Taipei-Huanbei section of the Airport MRT.

== Around the station ==
- Carrefour Qingpu Store (50m west of the station)
- Global Mall Taoyuan A19 (220m west of the station)
- Qingtang Park (350m northeast of the station)
- Taoyuan International Baseball Stadium (400m southwest of the station)
- Qingpu Sports Park (500m west of the station)
- Taiwan Land Art Garden (3.2km southwest of the station)
- Taoyuan Museum of Fine Arts

== Exits ==
- Exit 1: Section 2, High Speed Rail South Road

== See also ==
- Taoyuan Metro
