= Linghang metro station =

Metro station in Taoyuan, Taiwan

Linghang A17 領航
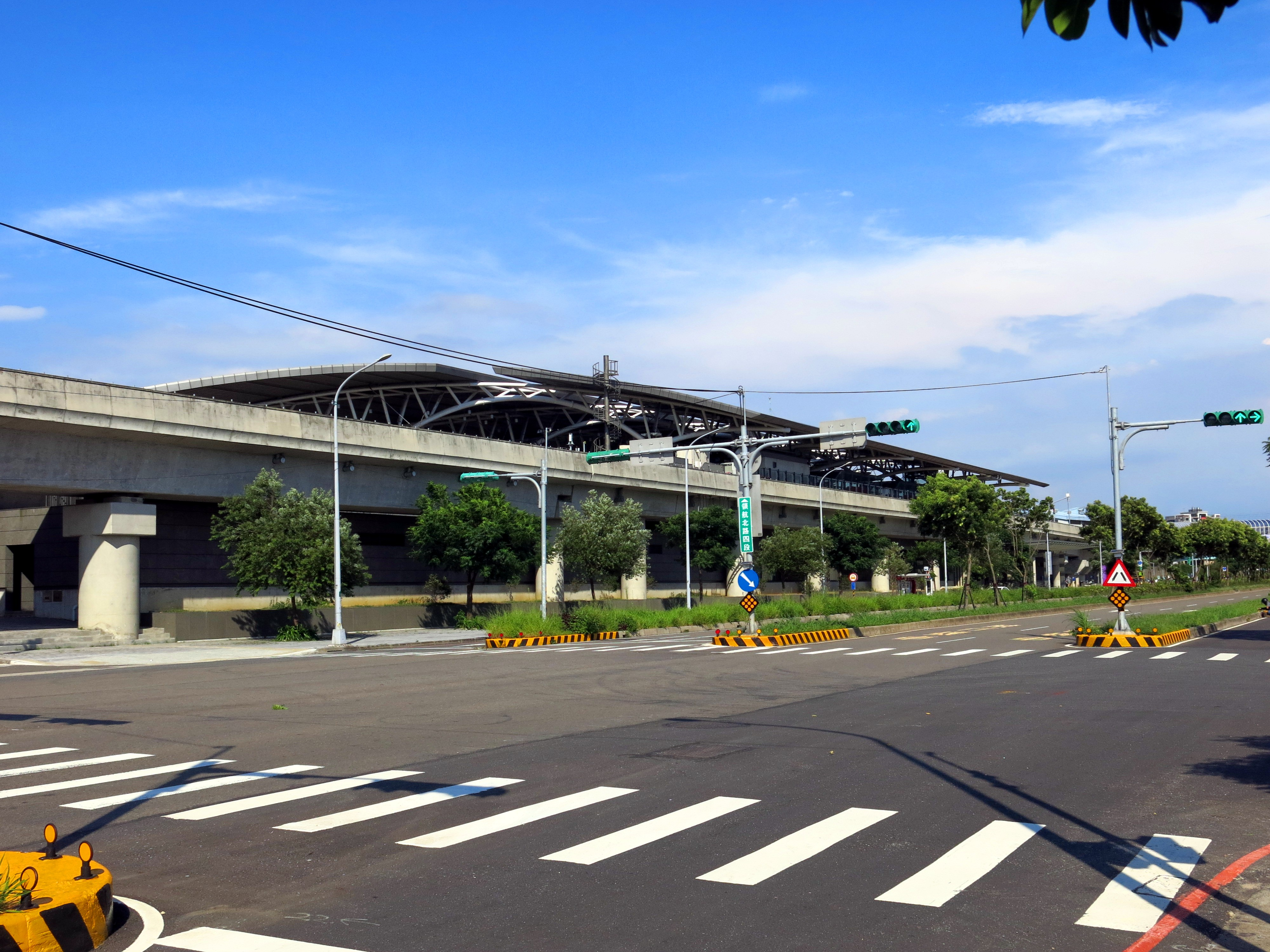

General information
- Location: 351 Sec 4 Linghang N Rd; Dayuan, Taoyuan City; Taiwan
- Coordinates: 25.0242°N 121.2211°E
- Operated by: Taoyuan Metro Corporation
- Line: Taoyuan Airport MRT (A17)
- Platforms: 2 island platforms

Construction
- Structure type: Elevated

Other information
- Station code: A17

History
- Opened: 2017-03-02

Passengers
- Aug 2025: 2,358 (entries and exits, daily)
- Rank: 20/22

Services
Preceding station	Taoyuan Metro	Following station
Hengshan towards Taipei Main Station	Taoyuan Airport MRT Commuter	Taoyuan HSR station towards Laojie River
Taoyuan Airport MRT does not stop here
Location

Linghang (Chinese: 領航), secondary station name: Dayuan International Senior High School (Chinese: 大園國際高中) is a station on the Taoyuan Airport MRT located in Dayuan District, Taoyuan City, Taiwan. It opened for commercial service on 2 March 2017.

This elevated station has two island platforms and four tracks, although only two tracks are in commercial use. Only commuter trains stop at this station. The station is 148.8 metres (488 ft) long and 21.6 metres (71 ft) wide. It opened for trial service on 2 February 2017, and for commercial service on 2 March 2017.

Construction on the station began on 18 September 2008, and it opened for commercial service on 2 March 2017 with the opening of the Taipei-Huanbei section of the Airport MRT.

== Layout ==
2F	Platform 1	Reserved for Chingpu Depot (not in service)
2F	Island platform, doors open on the right
2F	Platform 2	← Airport MRT toward Laojie River (Taoyuan HSR station)
2F	Platform 3	→ Airport MRT toward Taipei (Hengshan) →
2F	Island platform, doors open on the right
2F	Platform 4	Reserved for Chingpu Depot (not in service)
Street level	Station lobby, connecting concourse	Entrance/exit, information counter Automatic ticket machines, faregates, restrooms

== Around the station ==
- Hengshan Calligraphy Art Park (400m southwest of the station)
- Taoyuan Sunlight Arena (450m west of the station)
- Hengshan Calligraphy Art Center (600m southwest of the station)
- Dayuan International Senior High School (700m south of the station)

== Exits ==
- Exit 1: Section 4, Linghang North Road

== See also ==
- Taoyuan Metro
- Taoyuan Airport MRT
