= Taoyuan International Airport Services Limited =

Ground handling operator at Taoyuan International Airport

Taoyuan International Airport Services
- Company type: Public
- Industry: Aviation services
- Founded: February 1979
- Founder: China Airlines
- Headquarters: Taoyuan, Republic of China
- Owner: Public
- Parent: China Airlines Group
- Website: TIAS Official Website

Taoyuan International Airport Services (Abbreviation: TIAS; Chinese: 桃園國際機場地勤服務公司, commonly abbreviated 桃園航勤), founded in 1979, is currently the largest ground handling provider at Taoyuan International Airport, providing services for 30 scheduled airlines, out of 38 that served in Taoyuan International Airport. It is a subsidiary of China Airlines Group.

TIAS provides ground handling services, which includes baggage handling, aircraft load control, aerobridge and passenger steps operation, loading and unloading of aircraft, and cargo and mail delivery, to airline customers. TIAS also provides passenger and flight handling services, which includes passenger check-in, ticketing, flight dispatch, and cargo documentation. TIAS provides handling for 30 airlines out of 38 that operates in Taoyuan International Airport. Therefore, the company had a market share of over 75% in handling services at Taoyuan International Airport.

== Shareholders ==
TIAS was mainly held by China Airlines (55%) with the rest held by government MTC (45%). However, on 30 December 1999, UPS acquired a 6% stake in TIAS from China Airlines. Major shareholders of TIAS now include:

- China Airlines Group (49%)
- Government MTC (45%)
- UPS Airlines (6%)
