= Hsieh Shih-chien =

Taiwanese airline executive (1952–2025)

Hsieh Shih-chen
- 謝世謙
- Born: 1952
- Died: 16 January 2025 (aged 72); Beitou, Taipei, Taiwan
- Education: Soochow University (BA)
- Employer: China Airlines

Hsieh Shih-chien (Chinese: 謝世謙; pinyin: Xiè Shìqiān; 1952 – 16 January 2025) was a Taiwanese airline executive.

== Life and career ==
Hsieh was born around 1952. After graduating from the Department of Economics at Soochow University, Hsieh began working for China Airlines (CAL) in 1979. He began as an entry-level employee within the airline's financial department, and was later assigned to CAL offices in Kaohsiung and Taipei, as well as overseas in Indonesia and Australia. Prior to his appointment as president of China Airlines in June 2016, Hsieh led Taiwan Air Cargo Terminals Limited as chairman. While serving as president of China Airlines, Hsieh concurrently served as chairman of CAL's subsidiary Mandarin Airlines. In his capacity as president of China Airlines, Hsieh led negotiations with the China Airlines Employees Union in 2016, and the Taoyuan Union of Pilots throughout 2019, to end strikes. Hsieh succeeded Ho Nuan-hsuan as chairman of China Airlines in April 2019. Following reports of cigarette smuggling into Taiwan on China Airlines flights, legislator Huang Kuo-chang suggested that Hsieh resign his position with the airline.

In June 2020, Hsieh stated that although pay cuts for China Airlines employees and executives were in effect from April due to the COVID-19 pandemic in Taiwan, the airline would not resort to layoffs when the salary reductions expired in July.

Hsieh died at Taipei Veterans General Hospital of a heart attack on 16 January 2025, at the age of 72. At his death, Hsieh was the longest-serving chair of China Airlines who had never served in the Republic of China Air Force.
