= Taiwan Air Cargo Terminals Limited =

Taiwanese shipping company

Taiwan Air Cargo Terminal Limited 華儲股份有限公司
- Company type: Privately owned company
- Industry: Air transportation
- Founded: 1999
- Headquarters: Taoyuan, Taiwan
- Area served: Taipei; Taoyuan; Hsinchu
- Parent: China Airlines Group
- Website: Taiwan Air Cargo Terminals Limited

Taiwan Air Cargo Terminal Limited (TACTL; Chinese: 華儲股份有限公司) is the leading air cargo terminal operator in Taiwan. Located at the Taoyuan International Airport, it handles over 45% of Taoyuan International Airport's air cargo throughput.

== History ==
TACTL was founded in December 1999, in Taiwan. It started air cargo logistics operations at Taoyuan International Airport in 2000.

== Shareholders ==
TACTL is jointly owned by the following shareholders.

- China Airlines Group: 54%
- UPS Airlines: 8%
- Other Companies: 38%

== See also ==
- China Airlines Group
- China Airlines
- Taoyuan International Airport
