= RSEA =

Taiwanese construction company

RSEA Engineering Corporation
- Native name: 榮工工程股份有限公司
- Industry: Construction; Engineering
- Predecessor: Ret-Ser Engineering Agency
- Founded: 1956; 70 years ago
- Defunct: 30 April 2020
- Headquarters: Taipei, Taiwan
- Website: www.rsea.gov.tw

RSEA Engineering Corporation (RSEA; Chinese: 榮工工程股份有限公司) is a Taiwanese construction company. Founded as a sub-agency under the Veterans Affairs Council in 1956, it was known as the Retired Servicemen's Engineering Agency or Ret-Ser Engineering Agency (Chinese: 榮民工程事業管理處). It was reorganized into a state-controlled company in 1998 then privatized in 2009.

== History ==
In 1956, the RSEA was formed as a government agency that employed retired soldiers. The agency's first major project was the Central Cross-Island Highway, which was completed in four years "at the cost of one hundred dead and another two hundred men badly injured." In the 1970s, the agency was fully or partially responsible for eight of the Ten Major Construction Projects, namely China Steel in Kaohsiung, Port of Suao in Yilan County, National Freeway 1.

In 1965, the agency expanded its projects overseas and opened an office in Saudi Arabia in 1972. As of 1982, it had been awarded more than $1.23 billion of contracts in Saudi Arabia. Notable projects included the Sha'ar descent from Abha to Jizan.

As of 1986, the agency generated NT$25.1 billion (US$830 million) in revenue but only 0.72% in net profit margin, far below the 8% benchmark set by the Ministry of Finance. With the liberalization of the economy and increased competition, calls to transition the agency into a corporation started growing.

In 1991, RSEA negotiated a pilot project to build the Hsuehshan Tunnel and other drives on National Freeway 5. Construction started in July 1991, was initially expected to complete in 1995, but lasted 12 years instead.

=== Privatization ===
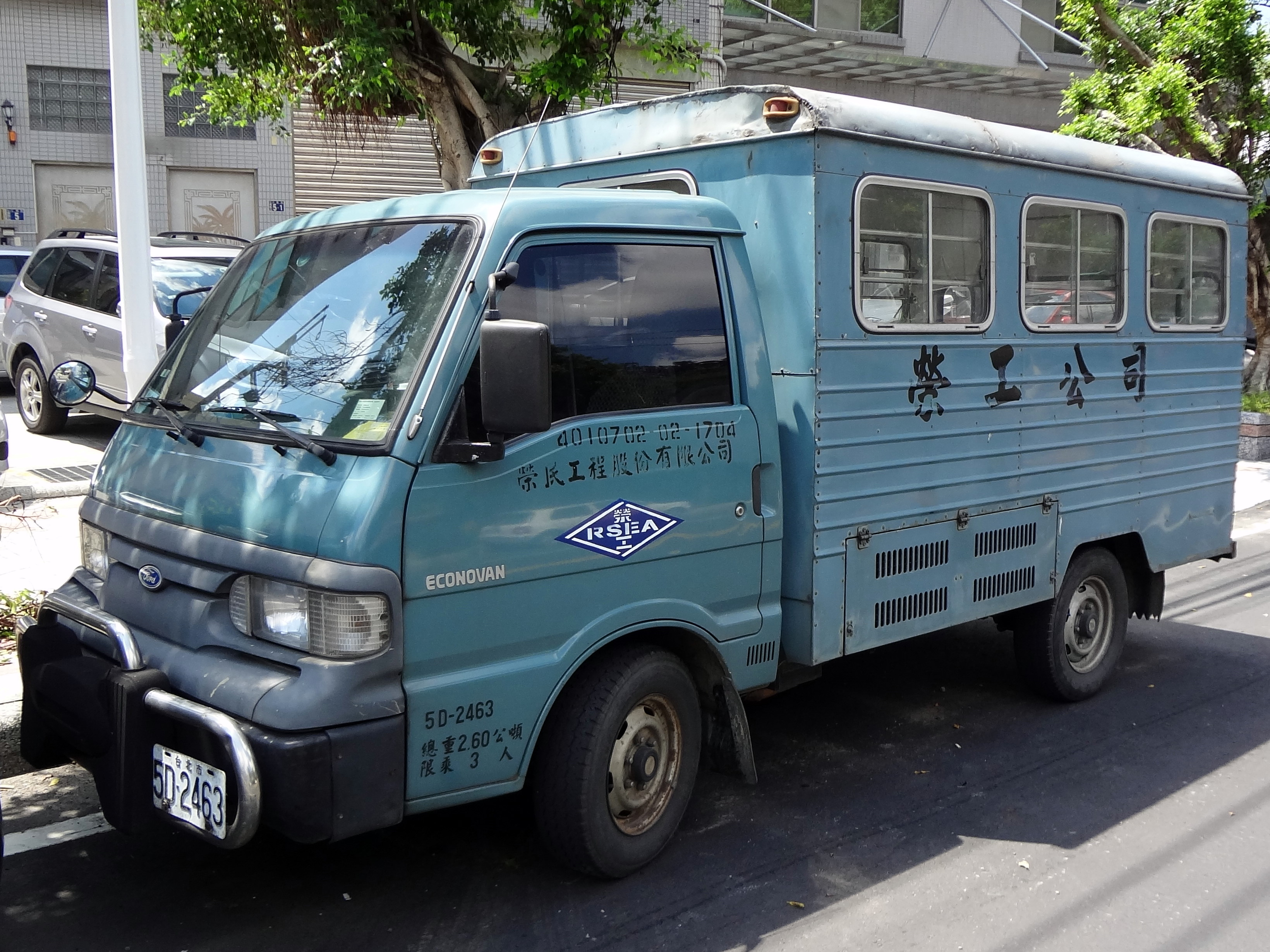
RSEA Engineering van in 2015

In 2021, RSEA and its contractors faced fines of NT$300,000 (approximately US$10,800) for a scaffolding collapse on a work site that led to three deaths. Jointly with Samsung C&T Corporation, RSEA won the contract to work on Taoyuan International Airport's Terminal 3, slated to be completed in 2026.

== Baseball sponsorship ==
In 1971, under the leadership of Yen Hsiao-chang (嚴孝章), RSEA established a U-12 youth baseball program in Hualien County. Three years later, the core team of the U-12 team formed the senior league team. The big league team was formed in 1977. The next year, the three teams moved to Banqiao in Taipei County.

In 1979, the RSEA senior league team defeated Taipei's Huaxing High School (華興) in the northern regional championship, ending Huaxing's 7-year championship streak. RSEA then defeated Pingtung County's Meihe Senior High School (美和) in the national tryout tournament. In doing so, RSEA became a third dominant force in high school baseball, disrupting the "Huaxing in the North, Meihe in the South" (北華興、南美和) rivalry.

As of 2004, RSEA no longer operated its own youth baseball team but instead supported Qiangshu High School's baseball program through an annual donation of NT$5 million (approximately US$150,000). Despite signing a 3-year deal, the prospect of continuing the sponsorship was in question due to the privatization process of the company.

Notable alumni of the RSEA programs include Chin-Feng Chen, Chien-Ming Wang, Yeh Chun-chang, among others.
