= China Airlines Group =

Transportation corporate group in Taiwan

China Airlines Group (Taiwan)
- Native name: 華航集團
- Type: Public
- Traded as: TWSE: 2610
- Industry: Transport; Hotel
- Headquarters: CAL Park, Taoyuan, Republic of China (Taiwan)
- Key people: Kao Shing-Hwang (chairman)
- Products: Cargo; Freight distribution Air transportation Hotel
- Owner: China Aviation Development Foundation; National Development Fund of the Executive Yuan
- Subsidiaries: China Airlines (100%); Mandarin Airlines (93.99%); Tigerair Taiwan (100%)
- Website: china-airlines.com

The China Airlines Group (Chinese: 華航集團) is the organizational designation used by a conglomerate of transportation and associated service companies based in Taiwan, officially the Republic of China. The group is publicly listed on the Taiwan Stock Exchange and is partially state-owned.

== Subsidiaries ==
=== China Airlines ===
China Airlines is Republic of China's (Taiwan) largest airline, operating regular flights to over 90 destinations worldwide. China Airlines features full passenger and dedicated cargo operations to North America, Asia, Europe, and Oceania.

=== Mandarin Airlines ===
Mandarin Airlines is a subsidiary of China Airlines. Mandarin Airlines features full passenger operations to Asia. Originally, Mandarin Airlines flew many of China Airline's International Routes into countries aligned with the PRC.

=== Tigerair Taiwan ===
Tigerair Taiwan is a low-cost carrier which commenced services in 2014. The airline was a joint venture between China Airlines and Tigerair Holdings but is now wholly owned by China Airlines Group as of 2017.

=== Novotel Taipei Taoyuan International Airport ===
Novotel Taipei Taoyuan International Airport is a hotel located beside Taiwan Taoyuan International Airport. It has 360 rooms and suites and a Premier Lounge with views of the airport runway located at Premier Floor.

=== Taoyuan International Airport Services ===
Taoyuan International Airport Services (commonly abbreviated 桃園航勤), founded in 1979, is currently the largest ground handling provider at Taoyuan International Airport, providing services for 30 scheduled airlines, out of 38 that served in Taoyuan International Airport.

=== China Pacific Catering Services ===
China Pacific Catering Services is a catering service, it is located adjacent to Taipei's Taoyuan International Airport. The company's automated facilities have the capacity to produce up to 30,000 meals a day. Currently, the kitchen serves 22 international airlines in addition to China Airlines. The company also provides outside catering and terminal catering services.

=== Taiwan Air Cargo Terminal ===
Taiwan Air Cargo Terminal Limited is a company that provides physical cargo handling service to import, export and transshipment cargo.

== Headquarters ==
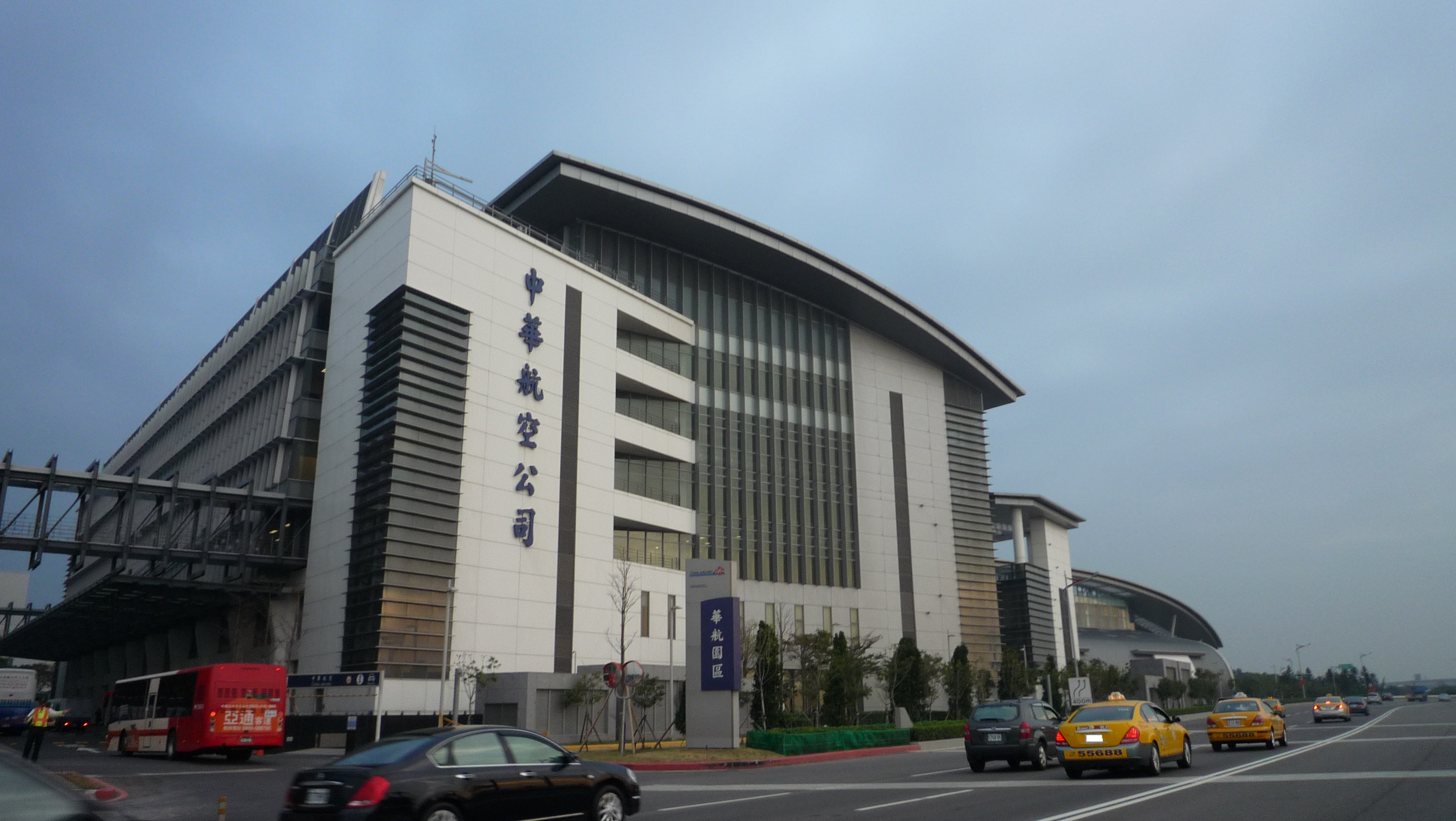
CAL Park

CAL Park is the headquarters of China Airlines Group.
