= Tigerair Taiwan =

Low-cost airline of Taiwan

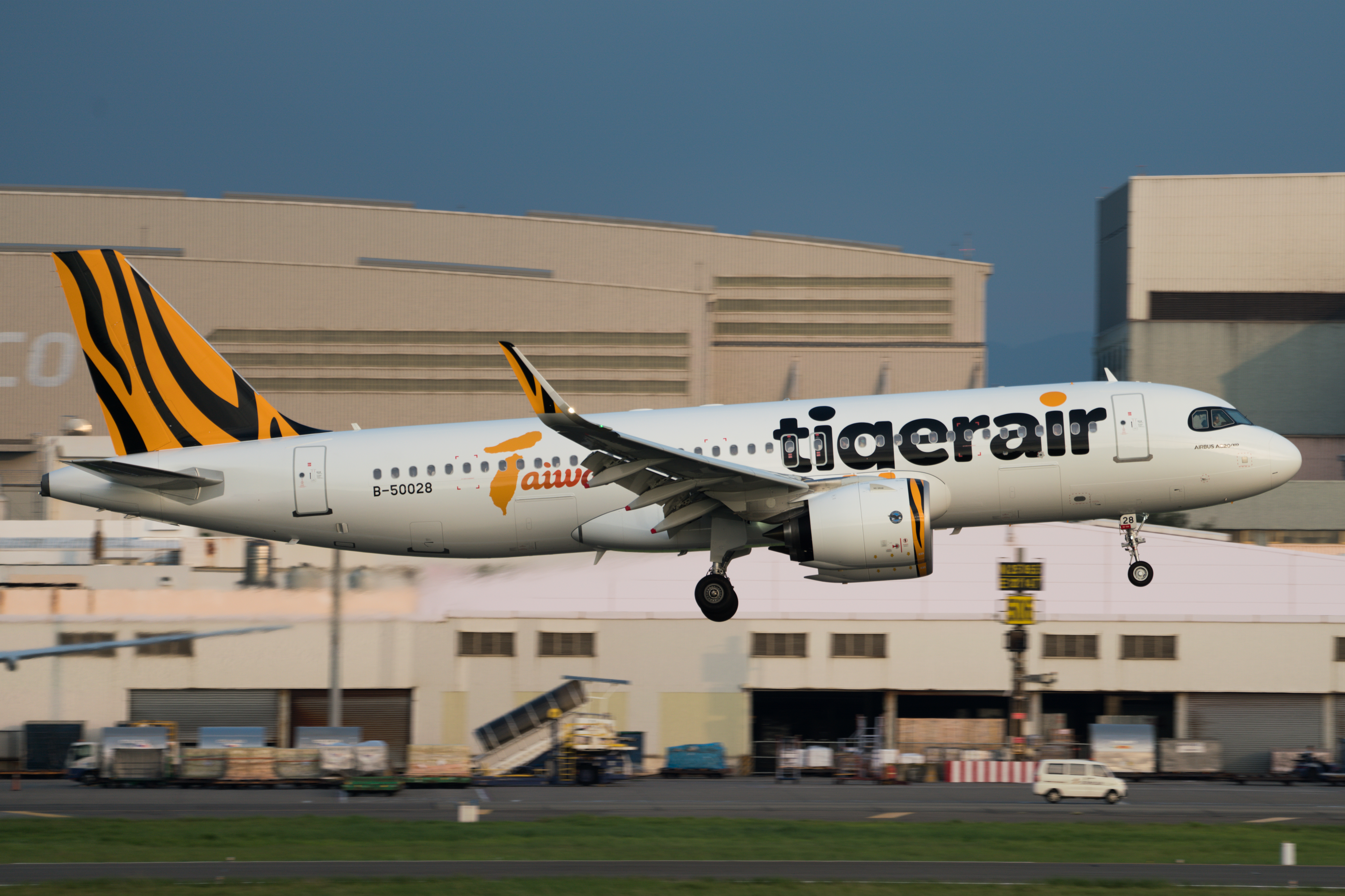
- Tigerair Taiwan Airbus A320neo
IATA	ICAO	Call sign
IT	TTW	SMART CAT
- Founded: 16 December 2013; 12 years ago
- Commenced operations: 26 September 2014; 12 years ago
- Operating bases: Kaohsiung International Airport; Taoyuan International Airport
- Fleet size: 17
- Destinations: 33
- Parent company: China Airlines Group
- Headquarters: No. 3, Alley 123, Lane 405, Tunghwa N. Rd., Taipei, 105008. Taiwan
- Key people: Kevin Chen (Chairman); Steve Chang (General Manager); Dennis Lai (COO); Bernard Hsu (CCO); Cindy Hsu (CFO)
- Website: www.tigerairtw.com

Tigerair Taiwan (Chinese: 臺灣虎航; pinyin: Táiwān Hǔháng) is a Taiwanese low-cost airline based at Taoyuan International Airport. It was formed as a joint venture between China Airlines Group (80%), Mandarin Airlines (10%) and Tiger Airways Holdings (10%). In 2017, China Airlines acquired the 10% shares held by Budget Aviation Holdings after Tigerair Singapore merged with Scoot. Tigerair Taiwan is the only LCC in Taiwan following the collapse of TransAsia Airways and V Air in 2016 and also the only airline left with Tigerair branding, after Tigerair Australia ceased operations in March 2020.

== History ==
Taiwan was the last major market in Asia to not have a low-cost carrier (LCC). In early 2013, China Airlines and TransAsia Airways became the first Taiwanese carriers to express interest in forming an LCC. The further reduction in entry barriers by the Civil Aeronautics Administration made it favorable for the creation of LCCs.

In October 2013, China Airlines chairman Sun Hung-Hsiang announced that the airline was in talks with a foreign LCC to start an LCC based in Taiwan. The partnership was made public in December 2013 when China Airlines created a new joint venture with Singaporean low-cost carrier Tigerair to establish Tigerair Taiwan. As part of the deal, China Airlines would hold a 90 percent share in the new carrier with Tiger Airways Holdings owning the other 10 percent. In March 2014, China Airlines subsidiary Mandarin Airlines took over 10% of its parent company's share in Tigerair Taiwan.

In September 2014, Tigerair Taiwan received an Air Operator's Certificate from the Civil Aeronautics Administration. The airline then commenced operations on 26 September 2014, with the first flight being from Taoyuan International Airport to Changi Airport.

In 2017, China Airlines acquired the 10% shares held by Budget Aviation Holdings after Tigerair Singapore merged with Scoot.

In 2021, China Airlines fully acquired global ownership of the Tigerair brand.

== Destinations ==
Tigerair Taiwan serves the following destinations:

Country / region	City	Airport	Notes	Refs
Japan	Akita	Akita Airport		
Japan	Asahikawa	Asahikawa Airport		
Japan	Fukuoka	Fukuoka Airport		
Japan	Fukushima	Fukushima Airport		
Japan	Hakodate	Hakodate Airport		
Japan	Hanamaki	Hanamaki Airport		
Japan	Ibaraki	Ibaraki Airport		
Japan	Komatsu	Komatsu Airport		
Japan	Kōchi	Kōchi Airport		
Japan	Kumamoto	Kumamoto Airport		
Japan	Miyazaki	Miyazaki Airport		
Japan	Nagoya	Chubu Centrair International Airport		
Japan	Naha	Naha Airport		
Japan	Niigata	Niigata Airport		
Japan	Oita	Oita Airport		
Japan	Okayama	Okayama Airport		
Japan	Osaka	Kansai International Airport		
Japan	Saga	Saga Airport		
Japan	Sapporo	New Chitose Airport		
Japan	Sendai	Sendai Airport		
Japan	Tokyo	Haneda Airport		
Japan	Tokyo	Narita International Airport		
Macau	Macau	Macau International Airport	Terminated	
Philippines	Cebu	Mactan–Cebu International Airport	Terminated	
Philippines	Kalibo	Kalibo International Airport	Charter	
Philippines	Puerto Princesa	Puerto Princesa International Airport	Charter	
South Korea	Busan	Gimhae International Airport		
South Korea	Daegu	Daegu International Airport		
South Korea	Jeju	Jeju International Airport		
South Korea	Seoul	Gimpo International Airport		
South Korea	Seoul	Incheon International Airport		
Taiwan	Kaohsiung	Kaohsiung International Airport		
Taiwan	Taichung	Taichung International Airport		
Taiwan	Tainan	Tainan Airport		
Taiwan	Taipei	Taoyuan International Airport	Hub	
Thailand	Bangkok	Don Mueang International Airport	Terminated	
Thailand	Phuket	Phuket International Airport		
Vietnam	Da Nang	Da Nang International Airport		
Vietnam	Phu Quoc	Phu Quoc International Airport		

=== Codeshare agreements ===
Tigerair Taiwan has codeshare agreements with the following airlines:

- Trinity Airways

== Fleet ==
=== Current fleet ===
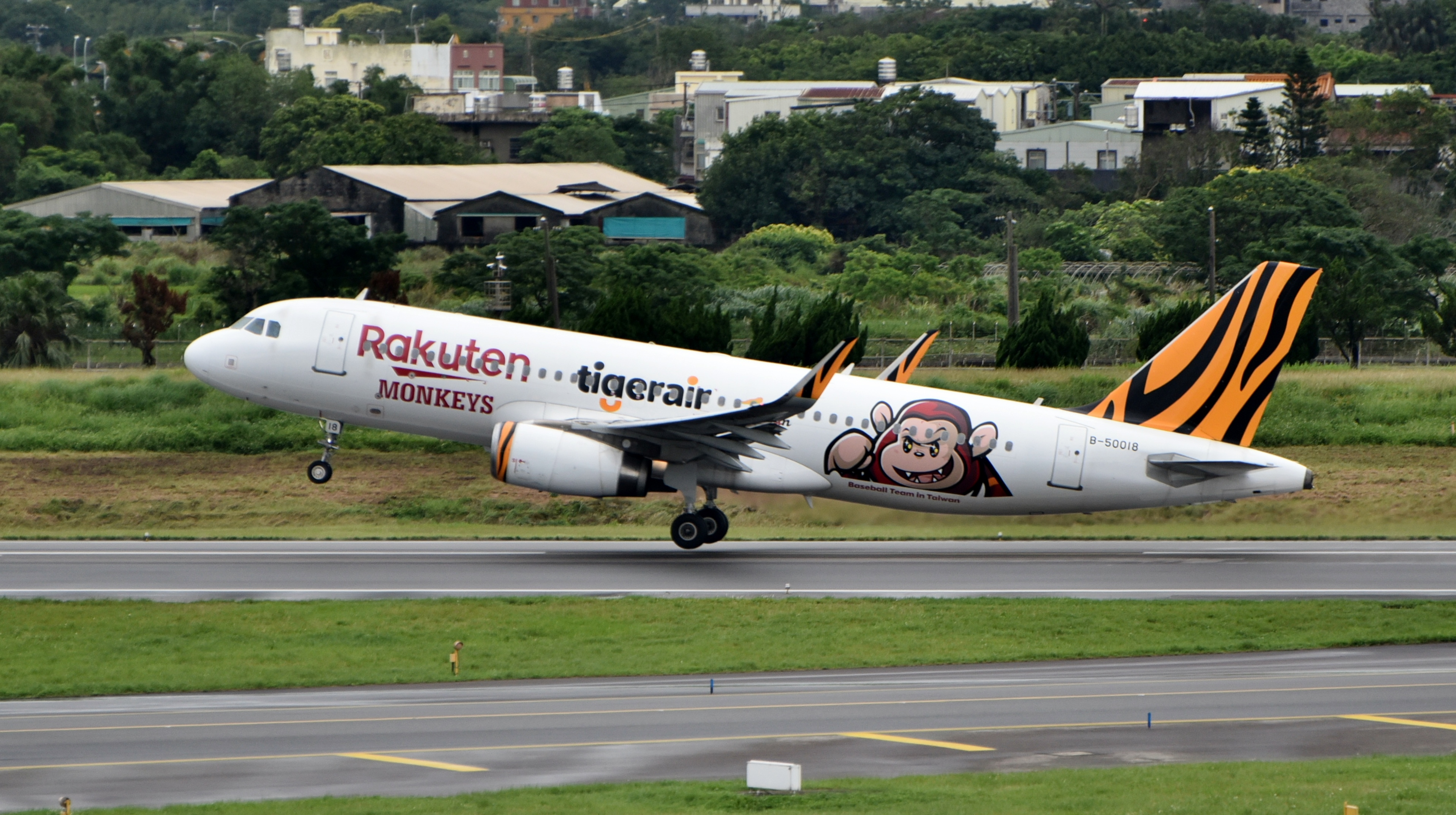
Airbus A320-200

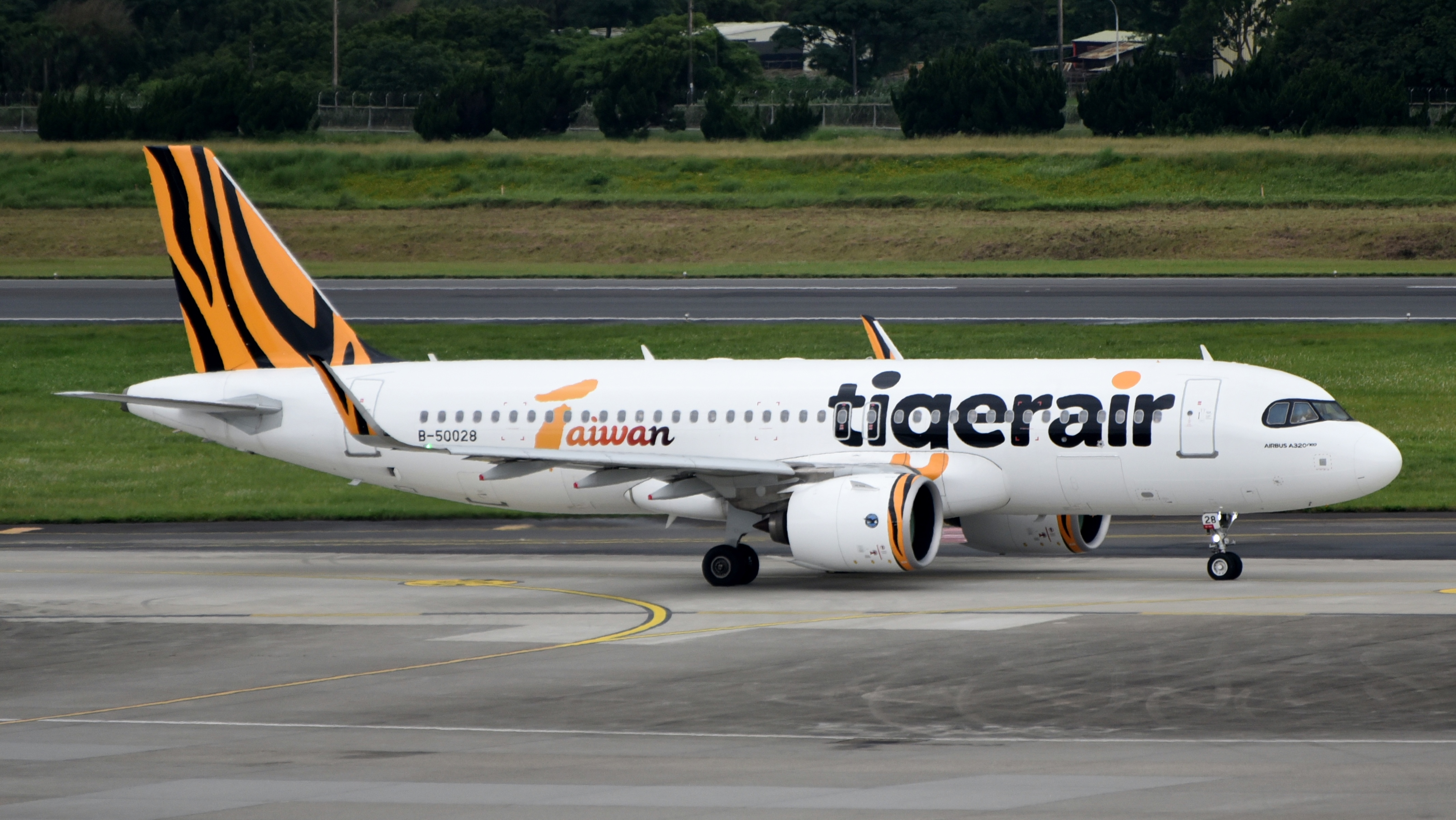
Airbus A320neo

As of December 2025, Tigerair Taiwan operates the following aircraft:

Tigerair Taiwan fleet
Aircraft	In fleet	Orders	Passengers	Notes
Airbus A320-200	9	—	180	
Airbus A320neo	8	7	180	
Airbus A321neo	—	15	233	
Total	17	22		

=== Livery ===
All Tigerair Taiwan aircraft wear the Tigerair group livery and most have the word "TAIWAN" painted onto the rear of the fuselage. The airline is the first international carrier to have the word 'Taiwan' as part of a corporate livery or a company name.

== See also ==
- List of airports in Taiwan
- List of airlines of Taiwan
- List of companies of Taiwan
- Transportation in Taiwan
- Air transport in Taiwan
