= Airport Hotel metro station =

Metro station in Taoyuan, Taiwan

Airport Hotel A14a 機場旅館
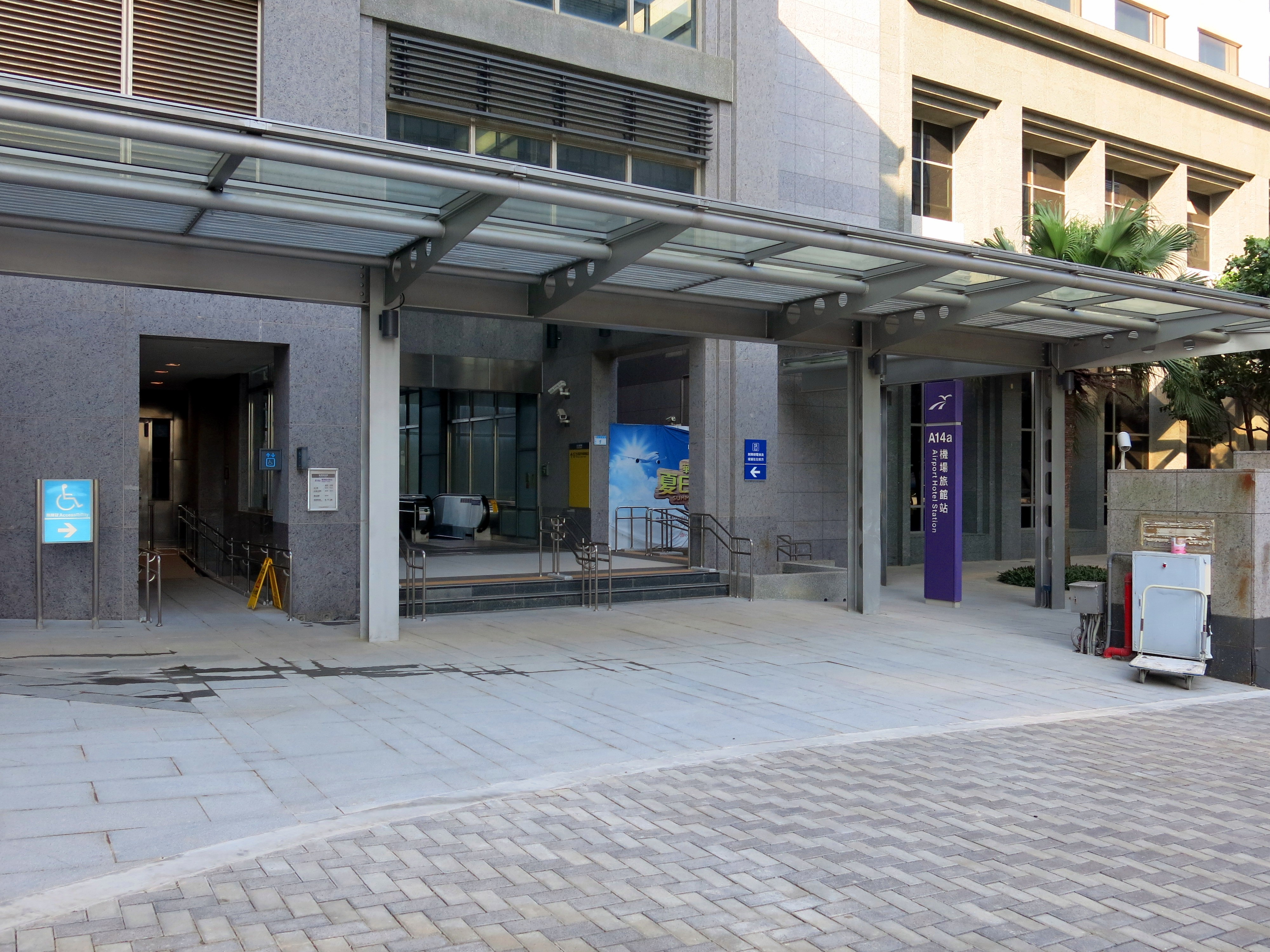

General information
- Location: 1-2 Hangzhan S Rd; Dayuan, Taoyuan City; Taiwan
- Coordinates: 25.069299603105478°N 121.22085885628125°E
- Operated by: Taoyuan Metro Corporation
- Line: Taoyuan Airport MRT (A14a)

Construction
- Structure type: Underground

Other information
- Station code: A14a

History
- Opened: 2017-03-02

Passengers
- Aug 2025: 2,537 (entries and exits, daily)
- Rank: 19/22

Services
Preceding station	Taoyuan Metro	Following station
Airport Terminal 2 towards Taipei Main Station	Taoyuan Airport MRT Commuter	Dayuan towards Laojie River
Taoyuan Airport MRT does not stop here
Location

Airport Hotel (Chinese: 機場旅館) is a station on the Taoyuan Airport MRT located in Dayuan District, Taoyuan City, Taiwan. The station is located under the Hyatt Regency Taoyuan International Airport (previously the Novotel Taipei Taoyuan International Airport until 31 December 2024) and opened for commercial service on 2 March 2017.

This underground station has one island platform and two tracks. Only commuter trains stop at this station. The station is 180.4 metres (592 ft) long and 16.3 metres (53 ft) wide. It opened for trial service on 2 February 2017, and for commercial service on 2 March 2017.

The station opened for commercial service on 2 March 2017 with the opening of the Taipei-Huanbei section of the Airport MRT.

== In popular culture ==
In 2016, this was where the subway bombing scenes were filmed for Taiwanese drama Wake Up 2, while the station was still under construction.

== See also ==
- Taoyuan Metro
