= CAL Park =

- 華航園區
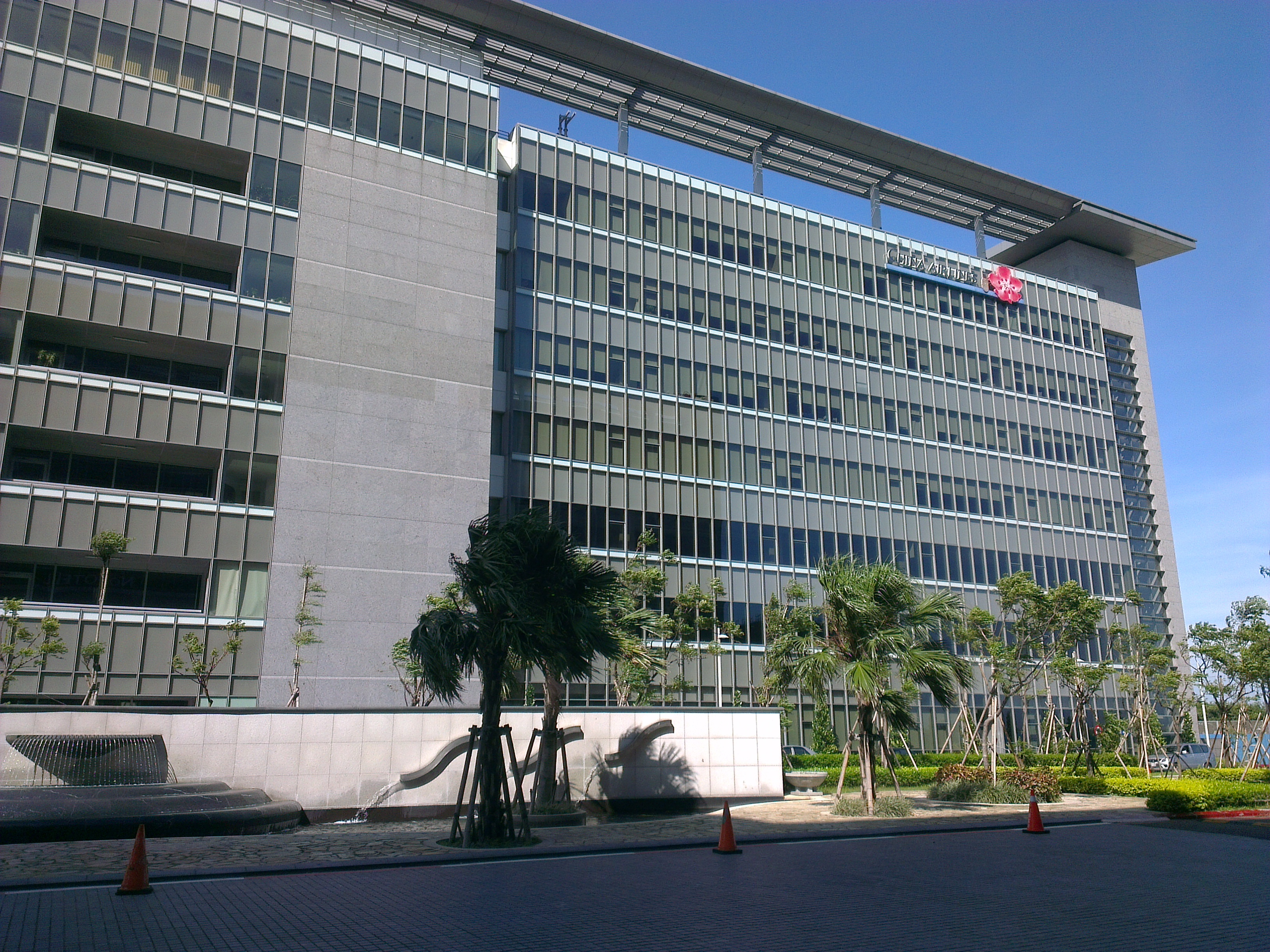
- CAL Park
- Interactive map of the CAL Park area

General information
- Status: Occupied
- Type: Commercial
- Location: Taoyuan International Airport; Dayuan, Taoyuan, Republic of China (Taiwan)
- Coordinates: 25.06782°N 121.22042°E

CAL Park
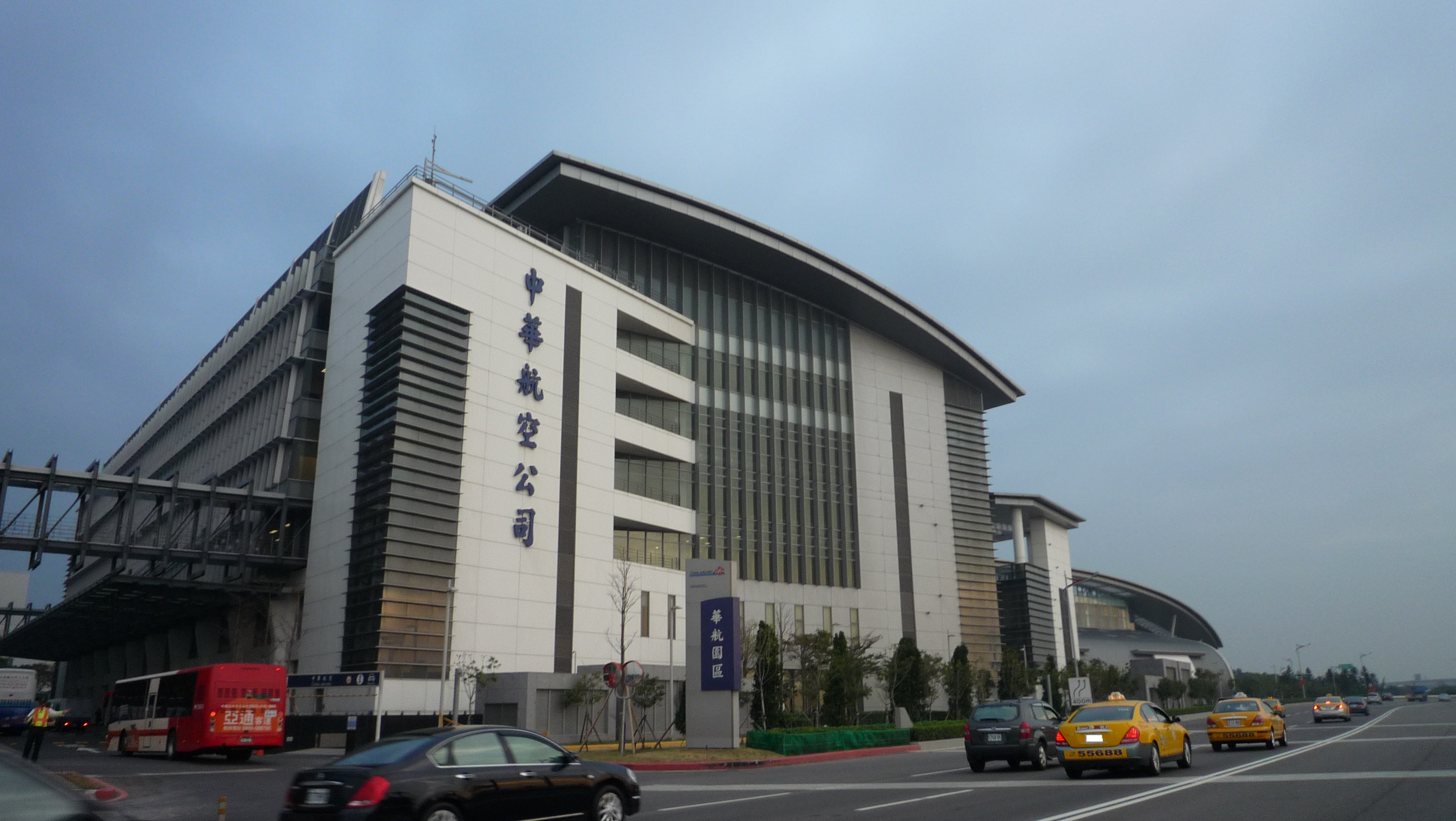
- CAL Park
- Traditional Chinese: 華航園區
- Simplified Chinese: 华航园区
Transcriptions
Standard Mandarin
- Hanyu Pinyin: Huáháng Yuánqū
- Wade–Giles: Hua²-hang² Yüan²-chʻü¹

The CAL Park (Chinese: 華航園區; pinyin: Huáháng Yuánqū) is located in Dayuan District, Taoyuan City in the Republic of China (Taiwan). The building is located next to Taiwan Taoyuan International Airport's terminals. The CAL Park is the flagship building and headquarters for China Airlines.

The CAL Park property consists of four buildings, including the head office building, the crew training center, the flight simulator training center, and the Novotel Taipei hotel. The four buildings are aligned in order from the shortest to the tallest; the company says that the design is meant to evoke progress. The design of CAL Park was intended to evoke the concept of flight, and the colors used in the design include blue, gray, silver, and white. The nine-story hotel, which opened in September 2009, was scheduled to have 360 guest rooms.

In September 2006 China Airlines established and invested $300,000,000 into the wholly owned Cal Park Co., Ltd. (Chinese Traditional: 華航園區股份有限公司, Simplified: 华航园区股份有限公司, Pinyin: Huáháng Yuánqū Gǔfěn Yǒuxiàngōngsī) with the intention of building a new corporate headquarters. On January 31, 2008, China Airlines began work on CAL Park. The groundbreaking ceremony was held on that day. Over 100 guests, including government officials, officers of the airport authority, vendors, executive representatives of China Airlines, and media personnel, attended the groundbreaking ceremony. The 4.5 billion New Taiwan dollar CAL Park was originally scheduled to open at the end of 2009. The complex consists of four towers. The groundbreaking ceremony of CAL Park was on January 31, 2008. The developer of CAL Park was CAL Park Co. Limited. The complex was under a 50-year contract which consists of 3 years of construction and 47 years of operation.

On March 26, 2010, China Airlines moved into its new headquarters. The airline held an inauguration ceremony for the facility on that day. CAL Park, with 16,520 square metres (177,800 sq ft) (1.65 hectare) of space, includes all of China Airlines's passenger and cargo executive operations, aircraft operations, ground handling services, maintenance, and simulator training.

The building has a net floor area of around 33,000 square metres. It has a total of 180 car park lots. The park is connected to Taoyuan Airport MRT.

== Architecture ==
The design of CAL Park incorporates the concept of flight. The complex was designed with modern architecture in colors of silver, white, gray and blue in order to show the spirit of China Airlines. As the flagship building for China Airlines, it bears the China Airlines' logo.

== See also ==
- China Airlines Group
- Cathay City
- Taoyuan Aerotropolis
