= Terminal 2 station =

Terminal 2 station may refer to:

- Terminal 2 Station (Beijing)
- Terminal 2 of Jiangbei Airport station
- Terminal 2 of Shuangliu International Airport station
- Terminal 2 (Mexico City Metrobús)
- Terminal 2 (Istanbul Metro)
- Airport Terminal 2 metro station (Taiwan), station on Taoyuan Airport MRT
- Terminal 2–Humphrey station, Minnesota
