= Taoyuan International Airport =

Main airport serving Taoyuan and Taipei, Taiwan

Taiwan Taoyuan International Airport 臺灣桃園國際機場

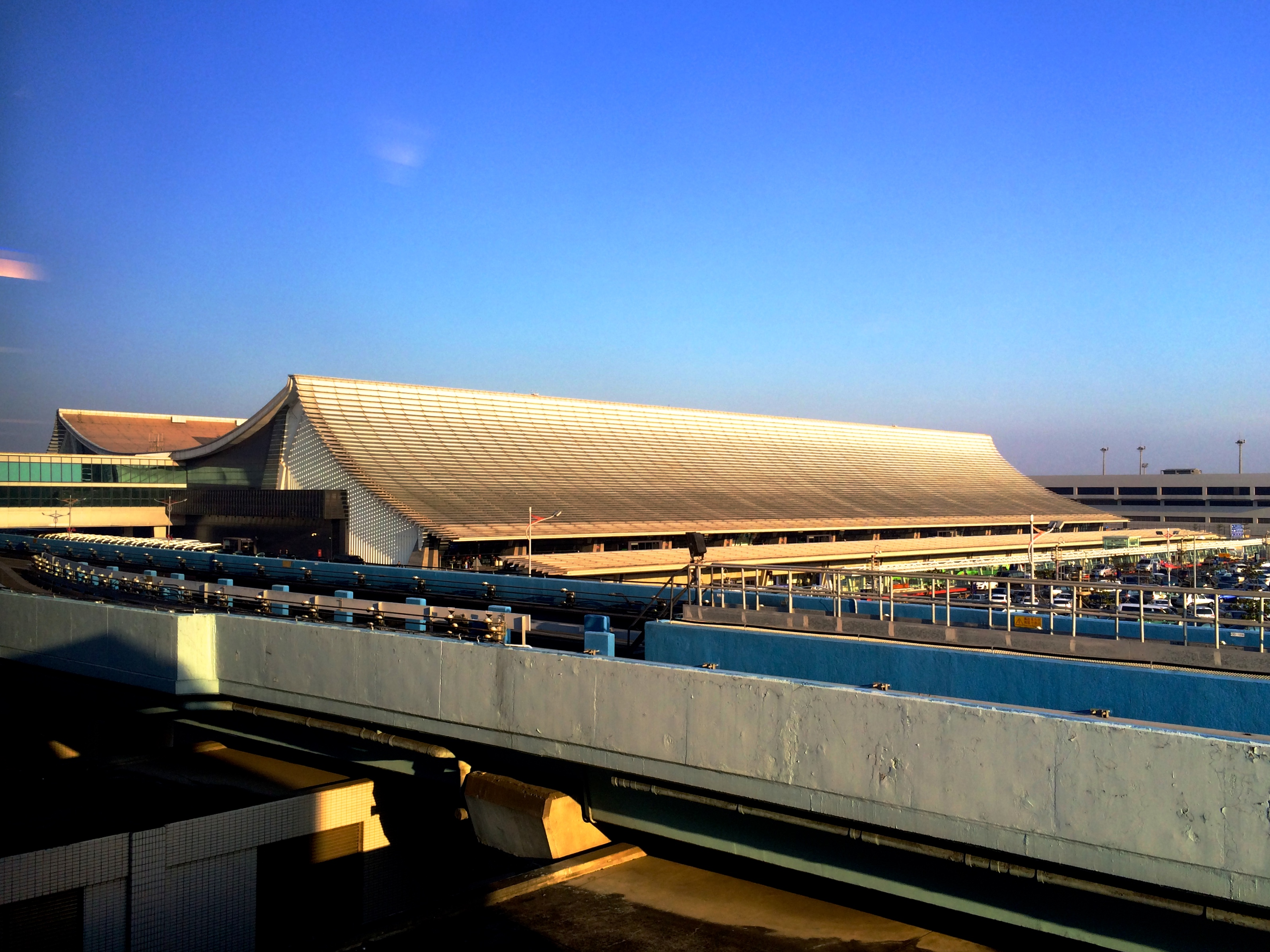
- Terminal 1 of the airport
- IATA: TPE; ICAO: RCTP

Summary
- Airport type: Public
- Owner/Operator: Taoyuan International Airport Corporation
- Serves: Taipei–Keelung and Taoyuan–Zhongli metropolitan areas; Northern Taiwan
- Location: Dayuan, Taoyuan, Taiwan
- Opened: 26 February 1979; 47 years ago
- Hub for: China Airlines; EVA Air; FedEx Express; Starlux Airlines; Tigerair Taiwan
- Focus city for: Cathay Pacific
- Operating base for: Scoot; Thai Lion Air; Thai VietJet Air; Tigerair Taiwan
- Elevation AMSL: 33 m (108 ft)
- Coordinates: 25°4′35″N 121°13′26″E
- Public transit access: Taoyuan Airport MRT: Airport Terminal 1 Airport Terminal 2
- Website: www.taoyuan-airport.com

Map
- Location of airport in Taiwan

Runways
Direction	Length		Surface
Direction	m	ft	Surface
05L/23R	3,660	12,008	Asphalt
05R/23L	3,800	12,467	Asphalt

Statistics (2025)
- Number of passengers: 47,795,969 ▲6.40%
- Aircraft movements: 262,217 ▲5.77%
- Airfreight movements: 2,499,898.5 tonnes ▲10.08%
- Sources: Civil Aeronautics Administration, Ministry of Transportation and Communications

Taoyuan International Airport
- Traditional Chinese: 桃園國際機場
- Simplified Chinese: 桃园国际机场
Transcriptions
Standard Mandarin
- Hanyu Pinyin: Táoyuán Gúojì Jīchǎng
- Bopomofo: ㄊㄠˊ ㄩㄢˊ ㄍㄨㄛˊ ㄐㄧˋ ㄐㄧ ㄔㄤˇ
Southern Min
- Hokkien POJ: Thô-hn̂g Kok-chè Ki-tiûⁿ

Chiang Kai-shek International Airport
- Traditional Chinese: 中正國際機場
- Simplified Chinese: 中正国际机场
Transcriptions
Standard Mandarin
- Hanyu Pinyin: Zhōngzhèng Guójì Jīchǎng
Southern Min
- Hokkien POJ: Tiong-chèng Kok-chè Ki-tiûⁿ

Taiwan Taoyuan International Airport (Chinese: 臺灣桃園國際機場) (IATA: TPE, ICAO: RCTP) is the main international airport serving Taipei, the capital of Taiwan, as well as the northern region. Located in Dayuan, Taoyuan, approximately 40 km (25 mi) west of Taipei, the airport is the busiest and largest in Taiwan. In 2016, it was ranked the best airport for its size in the Asia-Pacific region by Airports Council International.

The airport opened for commercial operations in 1979 as Chiang Kai-shek International Airport (中正國際機場) and was renamed in 2006. It is an important regional transshipment center, passenger hub, and gateway for destinations in Asia, and is one of two international airports that serves Taipei. The other, Taipei Songshan Airport, is located within the city limits and served as Taipei's only international airport until 1979 . Songshan now mainly serves chartered flights, intra-island flights, and limited international flights.

In 2018, Taoyuan International Airport handled a record 46.5 million passengers and 2.3 billion kg (2.5 million tons) of freight, making it the 11th busiest airport worldwide by international passenger traffic, and 8th busiest in terms of international freight traffic in 2018. It is the main international hub for China Airlines, EVA Air and Starlux Airlines. It is also a hub of Mandarin Airlines, Uni Air and Tigerair Taiwan.

== History ==
Eva Air Taipei Taoyuan Airport (TPE) runway 23L B777-300ER departure

By the 1970s, the original airport in Taipei City — Taipei Songshan Airport — had become overcrowded and could not be expanded due to space limitations. Thus, a new airport was planned to alleviate congestion. The new airport opened (with Terminal 1) on 26 February 1979, as part of the Ten Major Construction Projects pursued by the government in the 1970s. The airport was originally planned under the name Taoyuan International Airport but was later changed to Chiang Kai-shek International Airport in memory of former President Chiang Kai-shek.

The airport is the main hub of China Airlines, the Republic of China (Taiwan)'s flag carrier, as well as EVA Air, a private airline established in 1989. Overcrowding of the airport in recent years prompted the construction of Terminal 2, which was opened on 29 July 2000, with half of its gates operational; EVA Air was the first airline to move into Terminal 2. The remaining gates opened on 21 January 2005 for China Airlines, making China Airlines the only airline to operate from both terminals.

The airport has announced construction plans for a third terminal. In October 2015, the design of British firm Rogers Stirk Harbour + Partners, founded by Pritzker Architecture Prize-laureate Richard Rogers, was chosen for the 640,000-square-metre (6,900,000 sq ft) Terminal 3. Over US$2.3 billion was to be spent on the project, among the most costly construction projects in modern Taiwanese history. The terminal is expected to be opened in 2026 and accommodate 45 million passengers per year, boosting the yearly capacity of the airport to 86 million passengers.

Formerly known as Chiang Kai-shek International Airport, it was renamed in 2006 to its current name. The airport, originally planned as Taoyuan International Airport, bore the name of late President Chiang Kai-shek until 2006. In Chinese, its former name was literally "Chung-Cheng (Zhongzheng) International Airport", where Chung-Cheng is the legal given name that Chiang Kai-shek had used since the 1910s. In Taiwan, Chiang Kai-shek is associated with the Chinese Nationalist Party or Kuomintang and its many years of one-party authoritarian rule. Local officials in Taoyuan City and members of the Pan-Green Coalition often referred to the hub by the name originally associated with it: "Taoyuan International Airport". News organizations and local residents sometimes combined the two commonly used names as "Taoyuan Chung-Cheng Airport".

The Executive Yuan of then-President Chen Shui-bian's administration officially approved the name Taiwan Taoyuan International Airport for the hub on 6 September 2006. The opposition Kuomintang, which together with its political allies held a one-vote majority in the Legislative Yuan, decried the change and proposed "Taiwan Taoyuan Chiang Kai-shek International Airport" instead. The disagreement, like those affecting the names of the Chiang Kai-shek Memorial Hall and other landmarks in Taiwan, stands as another manifestation of the Taiwan localization efforts by pan-Green officials and resistance against it by Pan-Blue Coalition.

== Terminals ==
Taiwan Taoyuan International Airport currently has two terminals, which are connected by two short people movers. The third terminal is under construction, while the fourth terminal is planned, however plans may be halted. The Taoyuan Airport MRT links the terminals together underground and provides transportation to Taipei City.

=== Terminal 1 ===
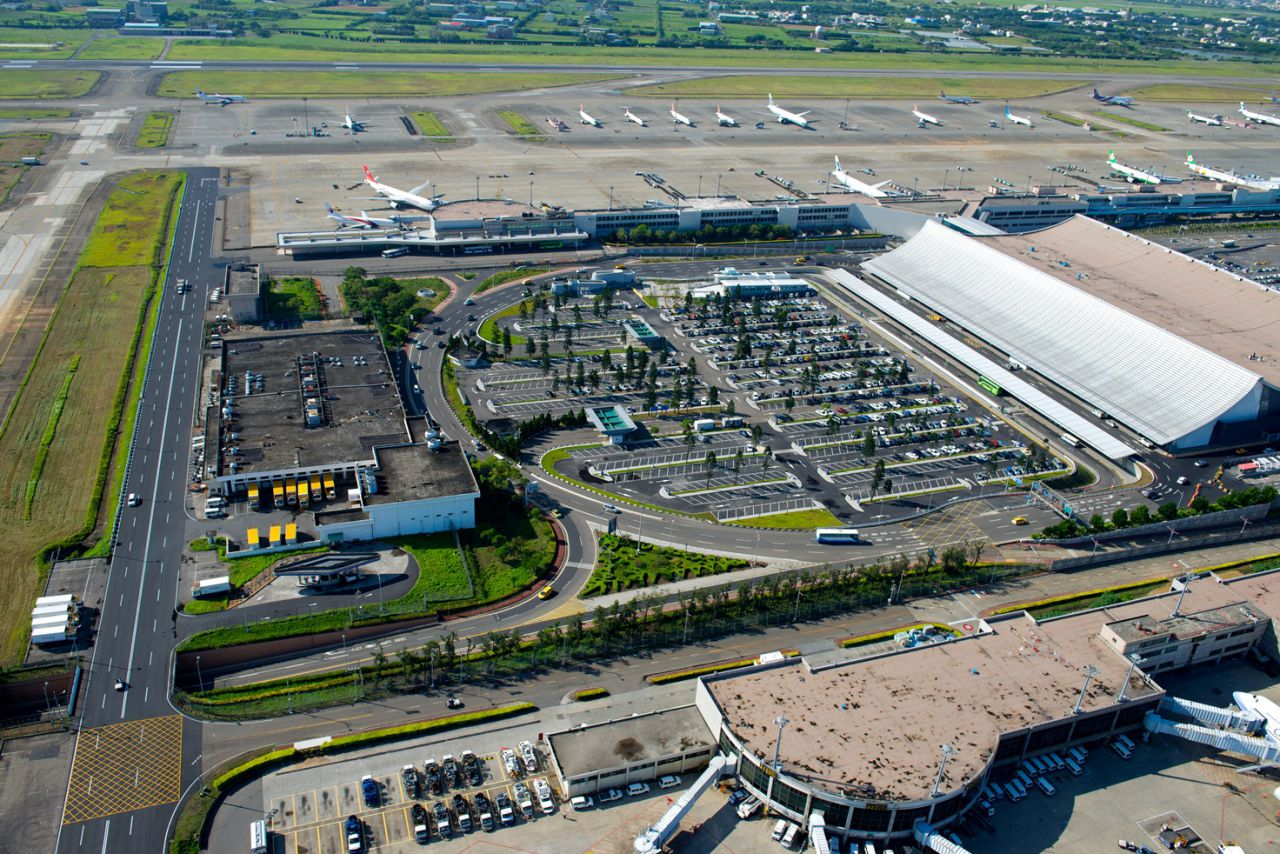
Aerial view of Terminal 1

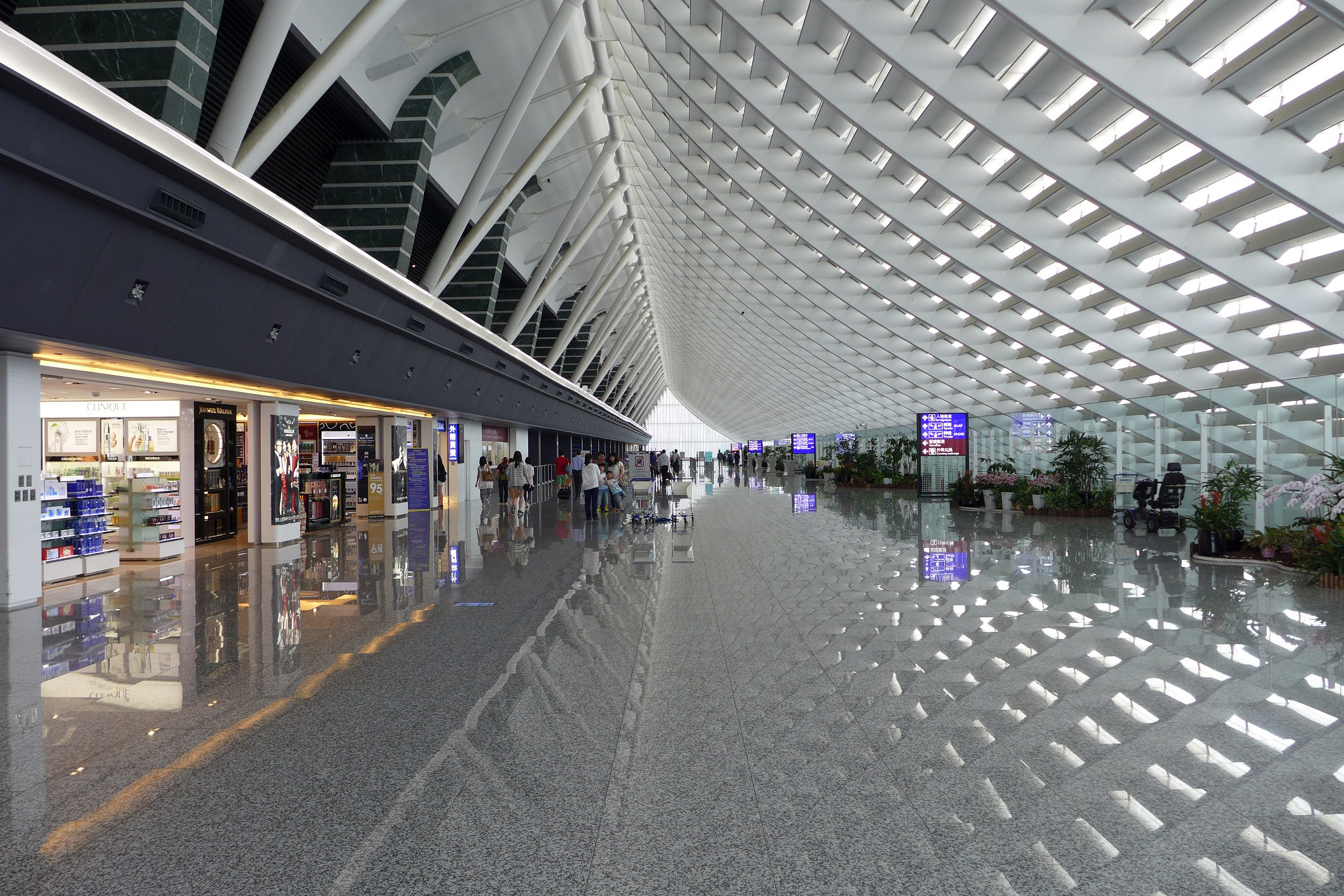
Renovated Terminal 1 arrival hall

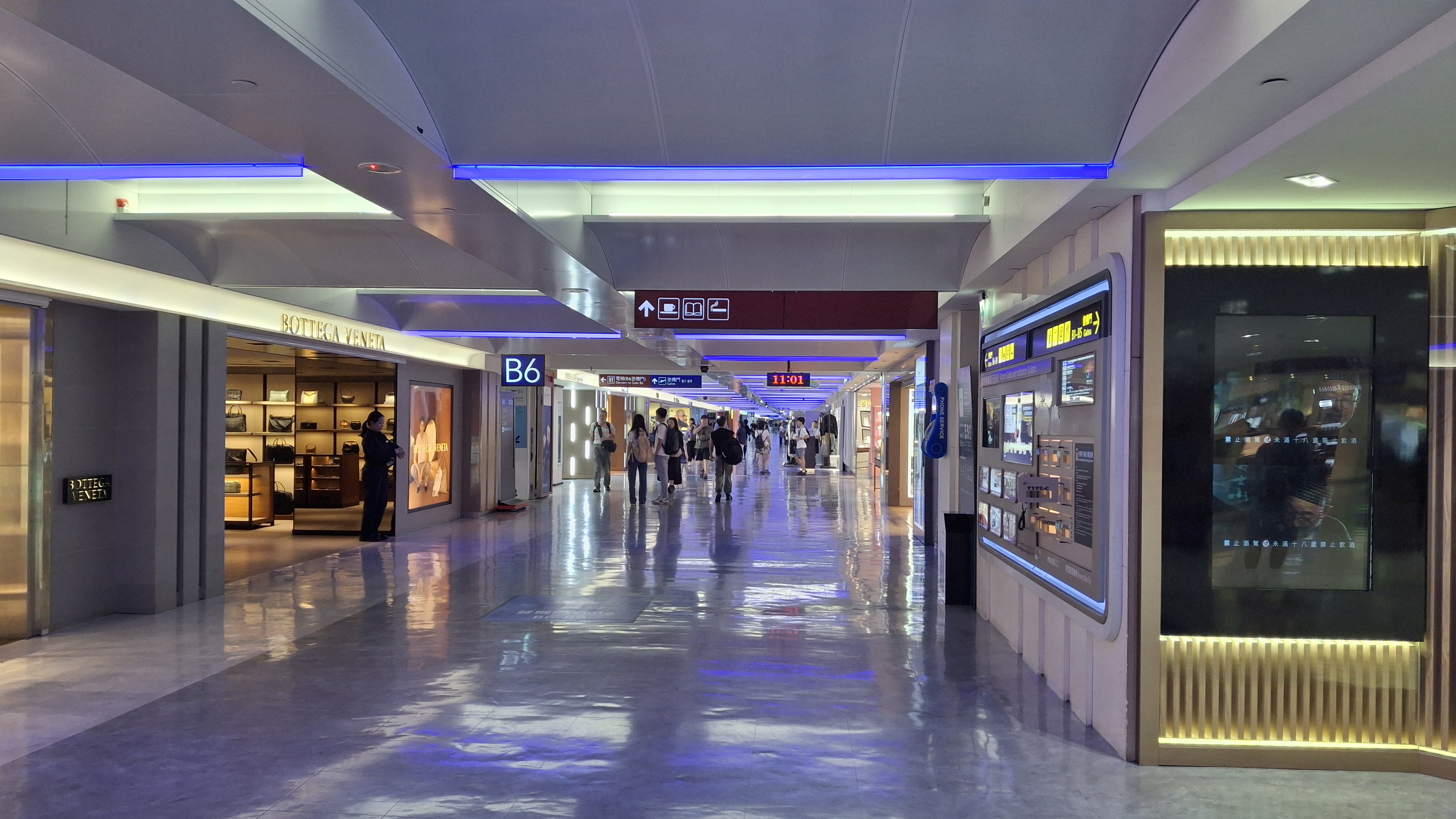
Terminal 1 gate area

Terminal 1 is the original passenger terminal of the Taiwan Taoyuan International Airport. The building was designed by Chinese-born, Taiwanese-American structural engineer Tung-Yen Lin and influenced by Eero Saarinen's Dulles International Airport Main Terminal. The five-storey, 169,500 m^{2} (1,824,000 sq ft) terminal, along with the airport, opened in 1979 to relieve the overcrowded Taipei Songshan Airport.

After the completion of Terminal 2, some gates from Terminal 1 were removed to make space for Terminal 2. Currently, Terminal 1 has 18 gates. Alphabetical letters were introduced when Terminal 2 was completed. The North Concourse is now Concourse A, and the South Concourse is now Concourse B. Before Terminal 2, gates were numbered from 1 to 22. China Airlines uses Concourse A for the majority of its flights in Terminal 1, while the third largest carrier of the airport, Cathay Pacific, operates most of its flights at Concourse B.

In 2012, the renovation project of the terminal, designed by Japanese architect Norihiko Dan, was completed, doubling the floor area, expanding check-in counters, increasing shopping areas and expanding car-parking facilities. Part of the project was the complete redesigning of both the exterior and interior of the terminal. The capacity of Terminal 1 is 15 million passengers per year. This renovation received the 2014 Taiwan Architecture Award from the Taiwan Architects Association.

=== Terminal 2 ===
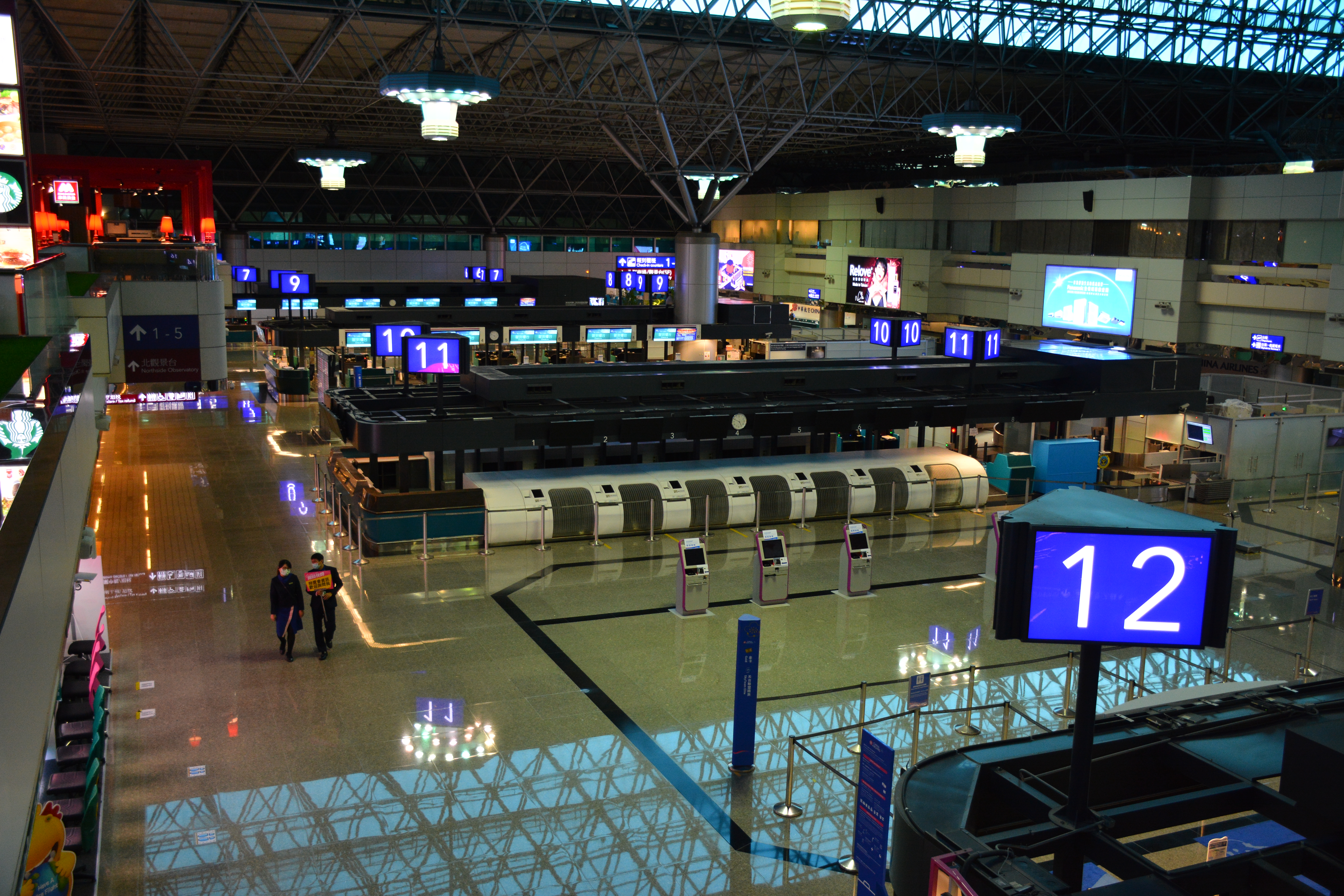
Terminal 2 departure hall

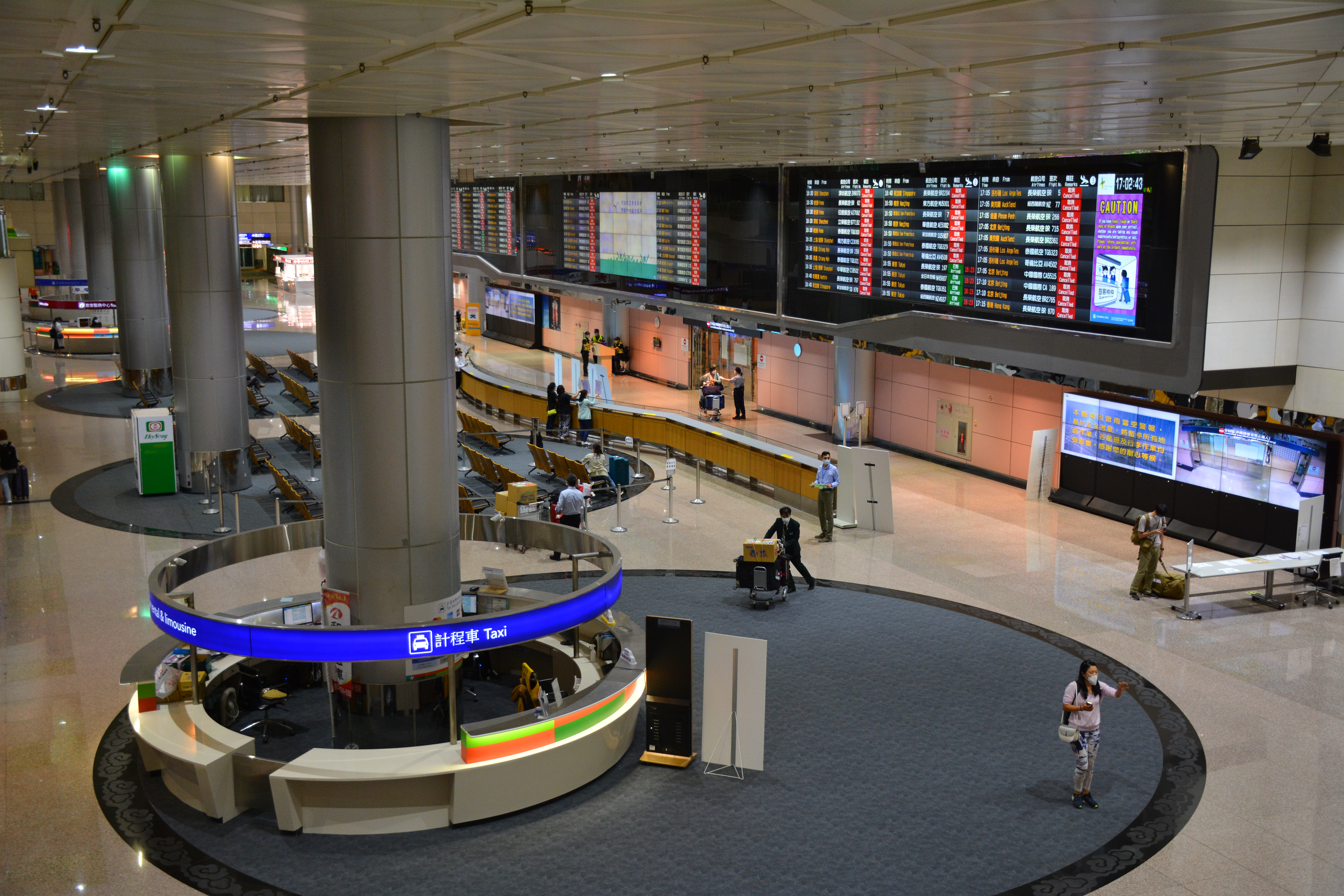
Terminal 2 arrival hall

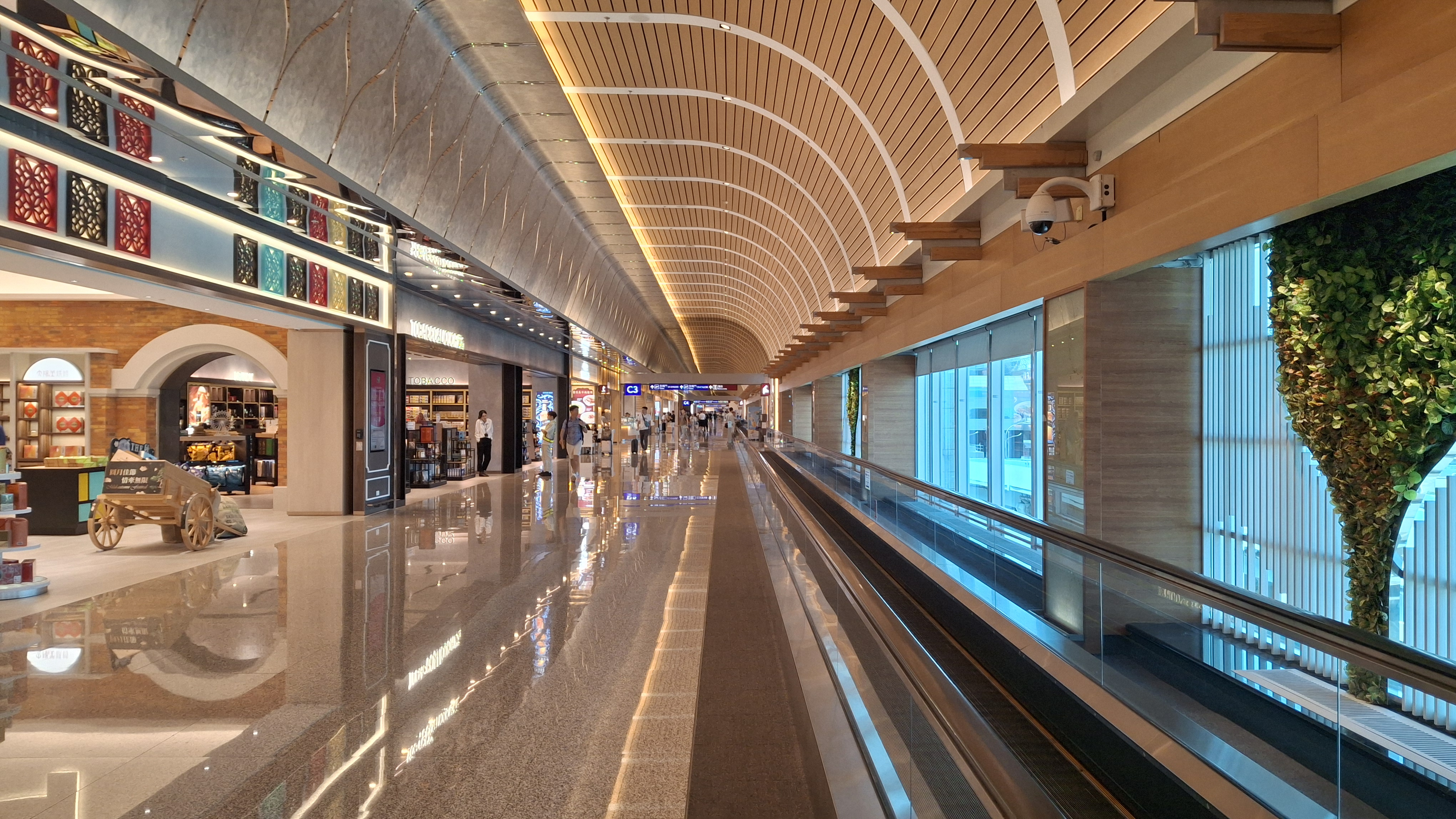
Terminal 2 gate area

Terminal 2 opened in 2000 to reduce heavy congestion in the aging Terminal 1. Only the South Concourse had been completed by the time the terminal opened. The South Concourse alone has 10 gates, each with 2 jetways and their own security checkpoints. The North Concourse opened later in 2005, bringing the total number of gates for Terminal 2 to 20 gates; the security checkpoints were moved to a central location in front of the passport control. The 318,000-m^{2} facility is capable of handling 17 million passengers per year.

The Southern and Northern Concourses are also known as Concourse C and Concourse D, respectively. Terminals 1 and 2 are connected by two short people mover lines, with one from Concourse A to D and the other from B to C. China Airlines uses Concourse D for the majority of its flights in Terminal 2 while EVA Air uses Concourse C for most of its operations. Terminal 2 renovation was completed in 2020.

=== Terminal 3 ===
Construction of Terminal 3 is part of the expansion project of Taoyuan International Airport. The 540,000 square meter Terminal 3 is designed by Rogers Stirk Harbour + Partners and will accommodate 45 million passengers per year. The new terminal was originally planned to be opened in 2020. However, the project has been delayed, which postpones its targeted completion by the end of 2027. South Korea's Samsung C&T owns 70% of the construction project, or $1.1 billion, while the remainder is held by Taiwan's RSEA Engineering. The North Concourse opened in December 2025, though passengers must currently use Terminal 2 for check-in, security and immigration procedures.

=== Terminal 4 ===
Originally part of the expansion project was a new Terminal 4. However, due to the vast amount of construction, the Ministry of Transportation ordered the airport company to halt the project in order to minimize traveller inconvenience.

== Airlines and destinations ==
=== Passenger ===
The following airlines operate regular scheduled and charter services to and from Taoyuan International Airport:

Airlines	Destinations
Aero K	Cheongju
Air Busan	Busan
Air China	Beijing–Capital, Chengdu–Shuangliu, Chongqing, Hangzhou, Shanghai–Pudong
Air Macau	Macau
Air New Zealand	Auckland
AirAsia	Fukuoka, Kota Kinabalu
AirAsia X	Kuala Lumpur–International, Osaka–Kansai
Asiana Airlines	Seoul–Incheon
Batik Air Malaysia	Kuala Lumpur–International
Cathay Pacific	Hong Kong, Nagoya–Centrair, Osaka–Kansai, Tokyo–Narita
Cebu Pacific	Manila
China Airlines	Amsterdam, Auckland, Bangkok–Suvarnabhumi, Beijing–Capital, Brisbane, Busan, Cebu, Chengdu–Shuangliu, Chongqing, Chiang Mai, Da Nang, Denpasar, Frankfurt, Fukuoka, Guangzhou, Hanoi, Hiroshima, Ho Chi Minh City, Hong Kong, Ishigaki, Jakarta–Soekarno-Hatta, Kagoshima, Koror, Kuala Lumpur–International, Kumamoto, London–Heathrow, Los Angeles, Manila, Melbourne, Nagoya–Centrair, Naha, New York–JFK, Ontario, Osaka–Kansai, Penang, Phnom Penh, Phoenix–Sky Harbor, Prague, Rome–Fiumicino, San Francisco, Sapporo–Chitose, Seattle/Tacoma, Seoul–Incheon, Shanghai–Pudong, Shenzhen, Singapore, Sydney–Kingsford Smith, Takamatsu, Tokyo–Narita, Toyama, Vancouver, Vienna, Yangon
China Eastern Airlines	Nanjing, Ningbo, Qingdao, Shanghai–Pudong, Wuhan
China Southern Airlines	Guangzhou, Shanghai–Pudong, Shenzhen, Wuhan, Zhengzhou
Delta Air Lines	Seattle/Tacoma
Eastar Jet	Busan, Cheongju, Jeju, Seoul–Incheon
Emirates	Dubai–International
Etihad Airways	Abu Dhabi
EVA Air	Amsterdam, Aomori, Bangkok–Suvarnabhumi, Beijing–Capital, Brisbane, Busan, Cebu, Chengdu–Shuangliu, Chiang Mai, Chicago–O'Hare, Clark, Da Nang, Dallas/Fort Worth, Delhi–Indira Gandhi (begins 1 December 2026), Denpasar, Fukuoka, Guangzhou, Hangzhou, Hanoi, Ho Chi Minh City, Hong Kong, Houston–Intercontinental, Jakarta–Soekarno-Hatta, Kobe, Komatsu, Kuala Lumpur–International, London–Heathrow, Los Angeles, Macau, Manila, Matsuyama, Milan–Malpensa, Munich, Naha, New York–JFK, Osaka–Kansai, Paris–Charles de Gaulle, Phnom Penh, San Francisco, Sapporo–Chitose, Seattle/Tacoma, Sendai, Seoul–Incheon, Shanghai–Pudong, Singapore, Tokyo–Narita, Toronto–Pearson, Vancouver, Vienna, Washington–Dulles
Greater Bay Airlines	Hong Kong
Hainan Airlines	Beijing–Capital, Guangzhou
HK Express	Hong Kong
Hong Kong Airlines	Hong Kong
Japan Airlines	Nagoya–Centrair, Tokyo–Narita
Japan Transocean Air	Naha
Jeju Air	Busan, Seoul–Incheon
Jetstar Japan	Osaka–Kansai, Tokyo–Narita
Jin Air	Busan, Jeju, Seoul–Incheon
Juneyao Air	Shanghai–Pudong
KLM	Amsterdam, Manila
Korean Air	Busan, Seoul–Incheon
Malaysia Airlines	Kuala Lumpur–International
Mandarin Airlines	Xiamen
Peach	Nagoya–Centrair, Naha, Osaka–Kansai, Tokyo–Haneda, Tokyo–Narita
Philippine Airlines	Manila
Philippines AirAsia	Manila
Royal Brunei Airlines	Bandar Seri Begawan
Scoot	Sapporo–Chitose, Seoul–Incheon, Singapore, Tokyo–Narita
Shandong Airlines	Qingdao
Shenzhen Airlines	Shenzhen
Sichuan Airlines	Chengdu–Shuangliu
Singapore Airlines	Singapore
Skymark Airlines	Charter: Kobe
Spring Airlines	Shanghai–Pudong
StarFlyer	Kitakyushu
Starlux Airlines	Auckland (begins 23 March 2027), Bangkok–Suvarnabhumi, Busan, Cebu, Chiang Mai, Clark, Da Nang, Denpasar, Fukuoka, Hakodate, Hanoi, Ho Chi Minh City, Hong Kong, Jakarta–Soekarno-Hatta, Kobe, Kuala Lumpur–International, Kumamoto, Los Angeles, Macau, Manila, Nagoya–Centrair, Naha, Ontario, Osaka–Kansai, Phoenix–Sky Harbor, Phu Quoc, Prague, San Francisco, Sapporo–Chitose, Seattle/Tacoma, Sendai, Shimojishima, Singapore, Sydney–Kingsford Smith (begins 23 March 2027), Tokyo–Narita
Sun PhuQuoc Airways	Phu Quoc
Thai AirAsia	Bangkok–Don Mueang, Chiang Mai, Naha, Sapporo–Chitose
Thai Airways International	Bangkok–Suvarnabhumi
Thai Lion Air	Bangkok–Don Mueang, Nagoya–Centrair, Naha, Osaka–Kansai, Tokyo–Narita
Thai VietJet Air	Bangkok–Suvarnabhumi, Naha, Osaka–Kansai, Sapporo–Chitose
Tigerair Taiwan	Akita, Asahikawa, Busan, Da Nang, Fukuoka, Fukushima, Hakodate, Hanamaki, Ibaraki, Ishigaki, Jeju, Kōchi, Komatsu, Miyazaki, Nagoya–Centrair, Naha, Niigata, Ōita, Okayama, Osaka–Kansai, Phuket, Saga, Sapporo–Chitose, Sendai, Seoul–Incheon, Tokyo–Haneda, Tokyo–Narita, Yonago
TransNusa	Charter: Manado
Trinity Airways	Daegu, Jeju
Turkish Airlines	Istanbul
Uni Air	Shenzhen
United Airlines	Guam, San Francisco
VietJet Air	Hanoi, Ho Chi Minh City, Phu Quoc; Charter: Dong Hoi
Vietnam Airlines	Hanoi, Ho Chi Minh City
Vietravel Airlines	Charter: Phu Quoc
XiamenAir	Fuzhou, Hangzhou, Xiamen
Zipair Tokyo	Charter: Tokyo–Narita

=== Cargo ===
Airlines	Destinations
Air Hong Kong	Hong Kong
Cargolux Italia	Ashgabat, Milan–Malpensa, Seoul–Incheon
China Airlines Cargo	Amsterdam, Anchorage, Atlanta, Bangkok–Suvarnabhumi, Chicago–O'Hare, Chongqing, Christchurch, Dallas/Fort Worth, Delhi–Indira Gandhi, Dubai–Al Maktoum, Frankfurt, Guangzhou, Hanoi, Ho Chi Minh City, Hong Kong, Houston–Intercontinental, Jakarta–Soekarno-Hatta, Kuala Lumpur–International, Los Angeles, Luxembourg, Manila, Miami, Mumbai–Shivaji, Nagoya–Centrair, New York–JFK, Osaka–Kansai, Penang, San Francisco, Seattle/Tacoma, Shanghai–Pudong, Shenzhen, Singapore, Tokyo–Narita, Toronto–Pearson, Xiamen
China Cargo Airlines	Shanghai–Pudong
DHL Aviation	Nagoya–Centrair, Singapore
Emirates SkyCargo	Dubai–Al Maktoum, Hanoi, Hyderabad
EVA Air Cargo	Singapore
Lufthansa Cargo	Frankfurt
Nippon Cargo Airlines	Tokyo–Narita
SF Airlines	Shenzhen
Singapore Airlines Cargo	Singapore

== Statistics ==
Operations and statistics
Year	Passengers	Airfreight movements (kg)	Aircraft movements
2016	42,296,322	2,097,228,422	244,464
2017	44,878,703	2,269,585,324	246,104
2018	46,535,180	2,322,820,028	256,069
2019	48,689,372	2,182,341,790	265,625
2020	7,438,325	2,342,714,268	118,449
2021	909,012	2,812,065,339	106,893
2022	5,342,448	2,538,768,310	112,496
2023	35,354,924	2,112,987,549	201,771
2024	44,921,996	2,270,973,770	247,918
2025	47,795,969	2,499,898,508	262,217

Capacity
Passenger (T1 & T2 current)	37,000,000
Passenger (T1, T2 & T3 2025)	82,000,000
Cargo (current)	1.7m tonnes

=== Busiest routes ===
Busiest routes (2025)
Rank	City	Number of passengers	% change 2025/24	Airport	Passengers	Carriers 2025 (largest carrier bolded)
1	Hong Kong	4,905,000	▲11.6%	Hong Kong	4,905,000	China Airlines, EVA Air, **Cathay Pacific**, Greater Bay Airlines, HK Express, Hong Kong Airlines, Starlux
2	Tokyo	3,700,874	▲0.9%	Narita	3,472,299	Cathay Pacific, China Airlines, **EVA Air**, Japan Airlines, Jetstar Japan, Peach, Scoot, Starlux, Thai Lion Air, Tigerair Taiwan
2	Tokyo	3,700,874	▲0.9%	Haneda	228,575	**Peach**, Tigerair Taiwan
3	Osaka	2,925,614	▲1.1%	Kansai	2,925,614	AirAsia X, Cathay Pacific, China Airlines, **EVA Air**, Jetstar Japan, Peach, Starlux, Thai Lion Air, Thai Vietjet, Tigerair Taiwan
4	Bangkok	2,747,310	▼2.9%	Suvarnabhumi	2,427,898	China Airlines, **EVA Air**, Starlux, Thai Airways, Thai Vietjet
4	Bangkok	2,747,310	▼2.9%	Don Mueang	319,412	Thai Air Asia, **Thai Lion Air**
5	Seoul	2,453,298	▲5.7%	Incheon	2,453,298	**Asiana Airlines**, China Airlines, EVA Air, Eastar Jet, Jeju Air, Jin Air, KLM, Korean Air, Scoot, Tigerair Taiwan
6	Singapore	1,994,149	▲3.9%	Changi	1,994,149	China Airlines, EVA Air, Singapore Airlines, **Scoot**, Starlux
7	Manila	2,058,454	▲11.8%	Ninoy Aquino	1,785,334	Cebu Pacific, China Airlines, **EVA Air**, KLM, Philippine Airlines, Philippines AirAsia, Royal Air Philippines, Starlux
7	Manila	2,058,454	▲11.8%	Clark	273,120	**EVA Air**, Starlux
8	Naha	1,568,890	▲24.3%	Naha	1,568,890	Batik Air, China Airlines, EVA Air, **Peach**, Starlux, Thai AirAsia X, Thai Vietjet, Tigerair Taiwan
9	Shanghai	1,547,372	▲18.2%	Pudong	1,547,372	Air China, **China Airlines**, China Eastern, China Southern, EVA Air, Juneyao Air, Spring Airlines
10	Ho Chi Minh City	1,465,301	▲9.4%	Tan Son Nhat	1,465,301	China Airlines, **EVA Air**, Starlux, Vietjet Air, Vietnam Airlines
11	San Francisco	1,262,231	▼8.8%	San Francisco	1,262,231	China Airlines, **EVA Air**, Starlux, United Airlines
12	Los Angeles	1,243,491	▼4.8%	Los Angeles	995,840	China Airlines, **EVA Air**, Starlux
12	Los Angeles	1,243,491	▼4.8%	Ontario	247,651	**China Airlines**, Starlux
13	Busan	1,176,498	▲27.3%	Gimhae	1,176,498	Air Busan, **China Airlines**, EVA Air, Eastar Jet, Korean Air, Jeju Air, Jin Air, Tigerair Taiwan
14	Fukuoka	1,134,359	▲12.5%	Fukuoka	1,134,359	Air Asia X, **China Airlines**, EVA Air, Starlux, Tigerair Taiwan
15	Sapporo	1,075,445	▲17.1%	New Chitose	1,075,445	China Airlines, **EVA Air**, Scoot, Starlux, Thai AirAsia X, Thai Vietjet, Tigerair Taiwan
16	Hanoi	1,007,498	▲9.2%	Noi Bai	1,007,498	China Airlines, **EVA Air**, Starlux, VietJet Air, Vietnam Airlines
17	Kuala Lumpur	987,015	▼9.1%	Kuala Lumpur	987,015	**Air Asia X**, Batik Air, China Airlines, EVA Air, Malaysia Airlines, Starlux
18	Macau	919,278	▲3.0%	Macau	919,278	Air Macau, **EVA Air**, Starlux, Tigerair Taiwan
19	Nagoya	917,362	▲14.1%	Chubu Centrair	917,362	Batik Air, Cathay Pacific, **China Airlines**, EVA Air, Japan Airlines, Peach, Starlux, Thai Lion Air, Tigerair Taiwan
20	Seattle	764,214	▲73.3%	Seattle	764,214	China Airlines, Delta Air Lines, **EVA Air**, Starlux

Top carriers (2025)
Rank	Airline	Passengers	Alliance	Carrier	Passengers
1	EVA Air	12,083,688	Star Alliance	EVA Air	11,974,915
1	EVA Air	12,083,688	Star Alliance	Uni Air	108,773
2	China Airlines	9,943,832	SkyTeam	China Airlines	9,803,922
2	China Airlines	9,943,832	SkyTeam	Mandarin Airlines	139,910
3	Starlux Airlines	4,526,174		Starlux Airlines	4,526,174
4	Cathay Pacific	2,534,203	Oneworld	Cathay Pacific	2,534,203
5	Tigerair Taiwan	2,274,752		Tigerair Taiwan	2,274,752
6	Scoot	1,536,149		Scoot	1,536,149
7	Peach	1,122,812		Peach	1,122,812
8	Air China	612,073	Star Alliance	Air China	612,073
9	China Southern Airlines	602,665		China Southern Airlines	602,665
10	HK Express	568,222		HK Express	568,222
11	Thai VietJet Air	558,900		Thai VietJet Air	558,900
12	China Eastern Airlines	539,356	SkyTeam	China Eastern Airlines	539,356
13	VietJet Air	527,665		VietJet Air	527,665
14	Jetstar Japan	506,591		Jetstar Japan	506,591
15	Korean Air	485,034	SkyTeam	Korean Airlines	485,034
16	Hong Kong Airlines	479,383		Hong Kong Airlines	479,383
17	Jin Air	466,303		Jin Air	466,303
18	Singapore Airlines	452,989	Star Alliance	Singapore Airlines	452,989
19	Asiana Airlines	445,793	Star Alliance	Asiana Airlines	445,793
20	Eastar Jet	410,548		Eastar Jet	410,548
21	Cebu Pacific	395,662		Cebu Pacific	395,662
22	Emirates	389,201		Emirates	389,201
23	Thai AirAsia	380,207		Thai AirAsia	380,207
24	United Airlines	380,118	Star Alliance	United Airlines	380,118
25	Thai Airways	360,842	Star Alliance	Thai Airways	360,842

Top countries (2025)
Rank	Country/region	Passengers 2025	% change 2025 / 24	Passengers 2024
1	Japan	13,112,857	▲9.5%	11,980,393
2	Hong Kong	4,905,000	▲11.6%	4,393,422
3	South Korea	4,437,828	▲10.2%	4,026,573
4 (1▲)	China	4,089,496	▲11.3%	3,672,888
5 (1▼)	United States	4,049,775	▲3.6%	3,908,529
6 (1▲)	Vietnam	3,192,685	▲2.2%	3,125,351
7 (1▼)	Thailand	3,139,190	▼3.6%	3,255,220
8	Philippines	2,442,430	▲9.7%	2,226,719
9	Singapore	1,994,149	▲3.9%	1,919,915
10	Malaysia	1,215,086	▼11.0%	1,365,437
11	Macau	919,278	▲3.0%	892,329
12	Indonesia	813,147	▲5.1%	773,874
13	Canada	662,458	▼3.0%	664,388
14	Australia	463,540	▲3.9%	445,959
15	United Arab Emirates	439,994	▲23.5%	356,309

== Airport facilities ==
=== Operations ===
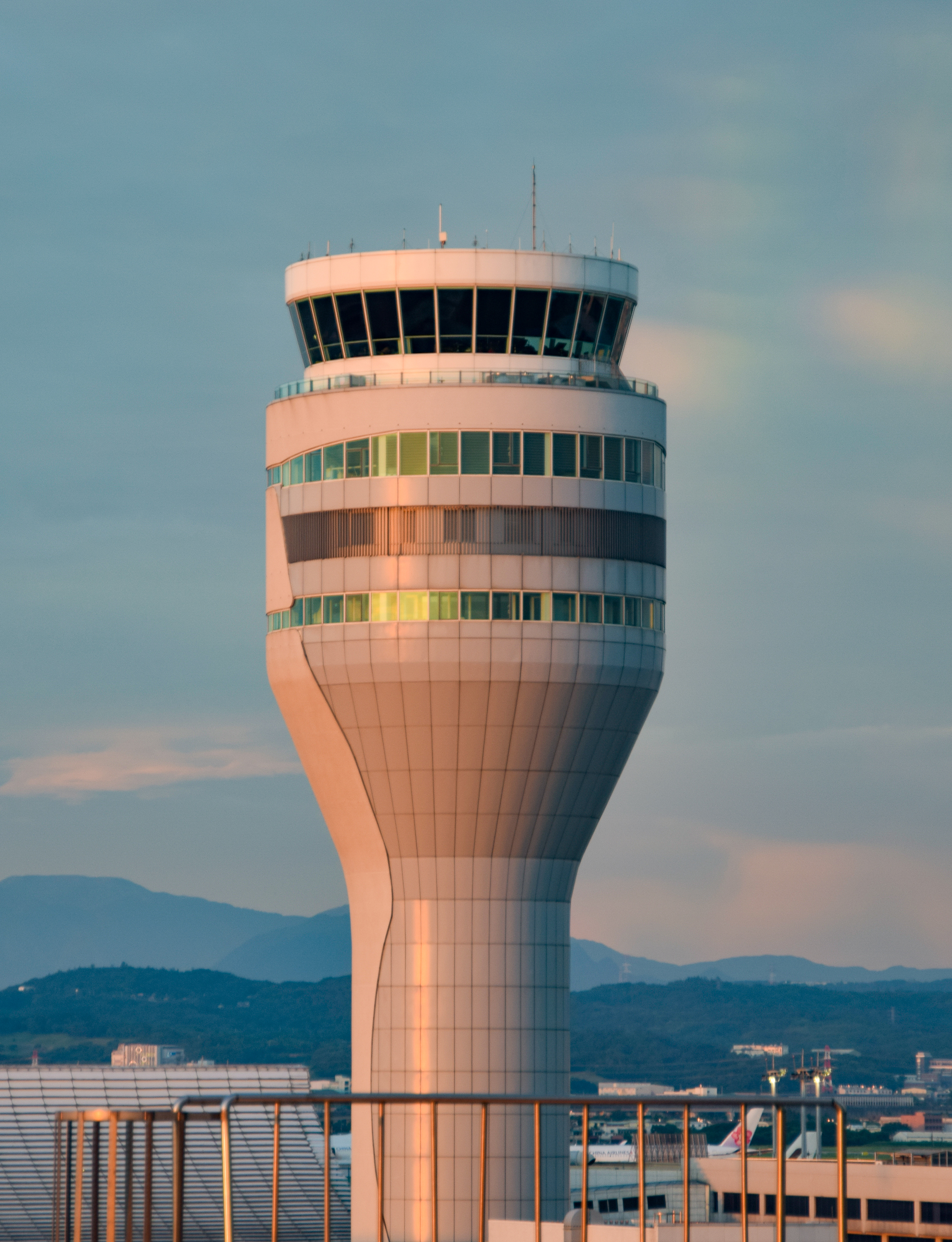
The new control tower

The airport is operated by the Taoyuan International Airport Corporation, a company wholly owned by the Government of Taiwan. The Civil Aeronautics Administration (CAA) is responsible for the provision of air traffic control services, certification of Taiwan registered aircraft, and the regulation of general civil aviation activities.

The airport has two parallel runways, with one 3660 meters in length and another 3800 meters in length and both 60 meters wide, enabling them to cater to the next generation of aircraft. Both runways have been given a Category II Precision Approach, which allows pilots to land in only 350-metre visibility. The two runways have an ultimate capacity of over 60 aircraft movements an hour.

There are 41 frontal stands at the main passenger concourse, 15 remote stands and 25 cargo stands. In 2015, the airport was the 11th busiest airport worldwide in terms of international passenger numbers, and sixth busiest in terms of international freight traffic.

The operation of scheduled air services to and from Taoyuan is facilitated by air services agreements between Taiwan and other countries. Since the opening of RCTP, the Taiwan Government has implemented a policy of progressive liberalisation of air services with the intention of promoting consumer choice and competition. Many low-cost airlines have started various regional routes to compete head-on with full-service carriers on trunk routes.

The airport's long term expansion opportunities are subject to variables. A NTD 300 billion proposal to build a third runway and a third terminal has been under feasibility study and consultation.

=== Terminal transit ===
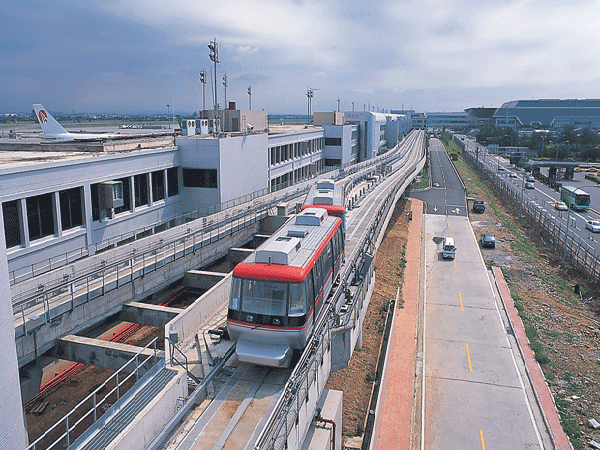
The Skytrain shuttles passengers between Terminals 1 and 2.

Transportation between Terminal 1 and Terminal 2 is provided by the Taoyuan Airport Skytrain, which transports both passengers who have cleared security and those who have not through separate train cars. The Taoyuan Airport MRT also serves Terminal 1, Terminal 2, and the Airport Hotel, offering free fare with an electronic ticket such as the EasyCard, IPASS (Taiwan), or icash2.0.

=== Huan Yu VIP Terminal ===
Huan Yu VIP Terminal, also known as the Taoyuan Business Aviation Centre (TYBAC), began service in September 2011 and was officially opened in mid-October 2011. The three-story facility has its own terminal and facilities separate from the public terminals. It provides a multimedia conference room, passenger lounge, private rooms and showers, spa, sauna, gym, and business centre facilities. Other services provided include ground handling, baggage handling, fuelling, security, customs and flight planning. Passengers planning to utilize TYBAC must sign up (to the Taiwanese immigration service) 3 days before use and pay a one-time service charge.

Statistics showed that 376 private jets landed and departed the airport through a six-month timeframe in 2011; this is a 100 percent increase from the same timeframe in 2010.

=== E-gate ===
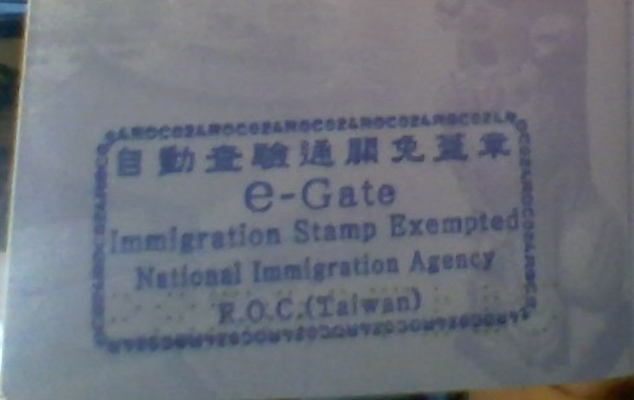
Stamp demonstrating successful enrollment

Passengers who are citizens of the R.O.C (Taiwan) with valid passports or non-citizens who have ROC (Taiwan) Resident Certificate (ARC/APRC) can register with facial features and fingerprints for the E-Gate. After registration, the passengers can choose either E-Gate or manual immigration clearance when entering or leaving the country.

=== Aircraft maintenance services ===
China Airlines Engineering and Maintenance Organization (CALEMO) and Evergreen Aviation Technologies (EGAT) both offers maintenance services at the airport. With its huge base, CALEMO has a market share of over 75% and can offer maintenance service of five wide-body airliners and one narrow-body airliner simultaneously. In March 2014, EGAT partnered with GE Aviation to form GE Evergreen which handles maintenance operations such as engine overhaul and is capable of aircraft conversion programs, such as the Dreamlifter program.

In 2022, aerospace company Nordam opened a major components repair facility at Taoyuan, which will serve as their regional hub replacing operations in Singapore.

== Ground transportation ==
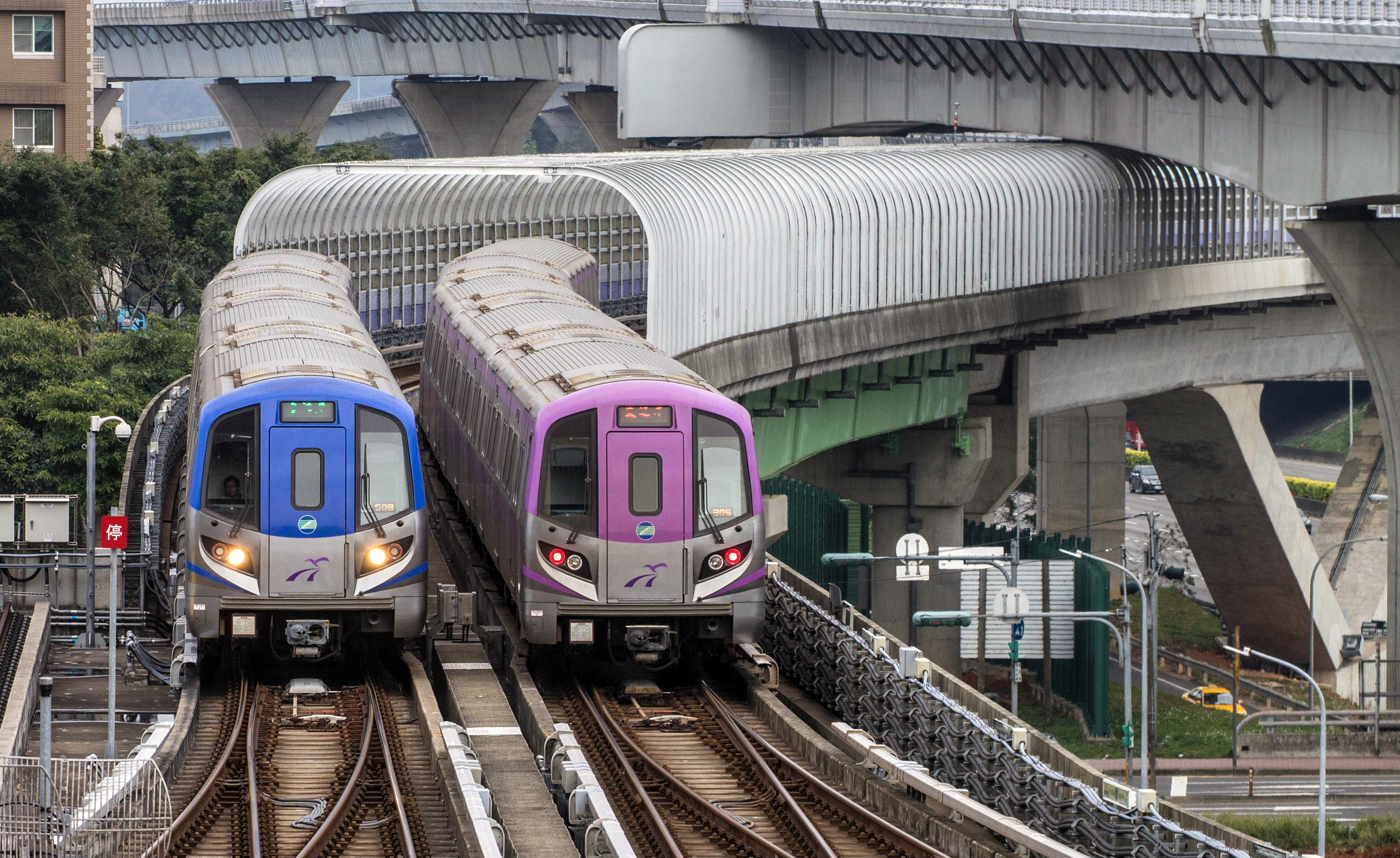
Taoyuan Airport MRT Commuter (left) and Express (right) trains

=== Bus ===
Frequent buses link the airport to Taipei, Taoyuan, Zhongli, Taichung, Banqiao, Changhua, and THSR's Taoyuan Station. Bus terminals are present at both terminals.

=== Rail ===
- Taoyuan Airport MRT: Links both terminals at the airport to Taipei and Zhongli District, Taoyuan City. Free Wi-Fi and wireless charging services provided on trains. Passengers flying China Airlines, EVA Air, Mandarin Airlines, and UNI Air can utilize downtown check-in and luggage facilities at Taipei Main Station. The Airport offers free admission to Taoyuan Airport MRT stations A12 (Airport Terminal 1), A13 (Airport Terminal 2), and A14a (Airport Hotel) with an electronic ticket and a credit card.
  - Express train: 38-minute link between the airport and downtown Taipei. Stops at both airport terminals, Chang Gung Memorial Hospital, New Taipei Industrial Park, and Taipei Main Station.
  - Commuter train: 45-minute link between the airport and downtown Taipei. Stops at all 21 stations on the line.
- Taiwan High Speed Rail Taoyuan HSR station is about 8 km (5.0 mi) away and is accessible by the Taoyuan Airport MRT's commuter train and shuttle bus.

=== Taxi ===
Taxi queues are outside the arrival halls of both terminals and are available 24 hours a day. They are metered and subject to a 15-percent surcharge.

=== Car rental ===
Car rentals are available at both terminals. The airport is served by National Highway No. 2.

== Other facilities ==
=== CAL Park ===
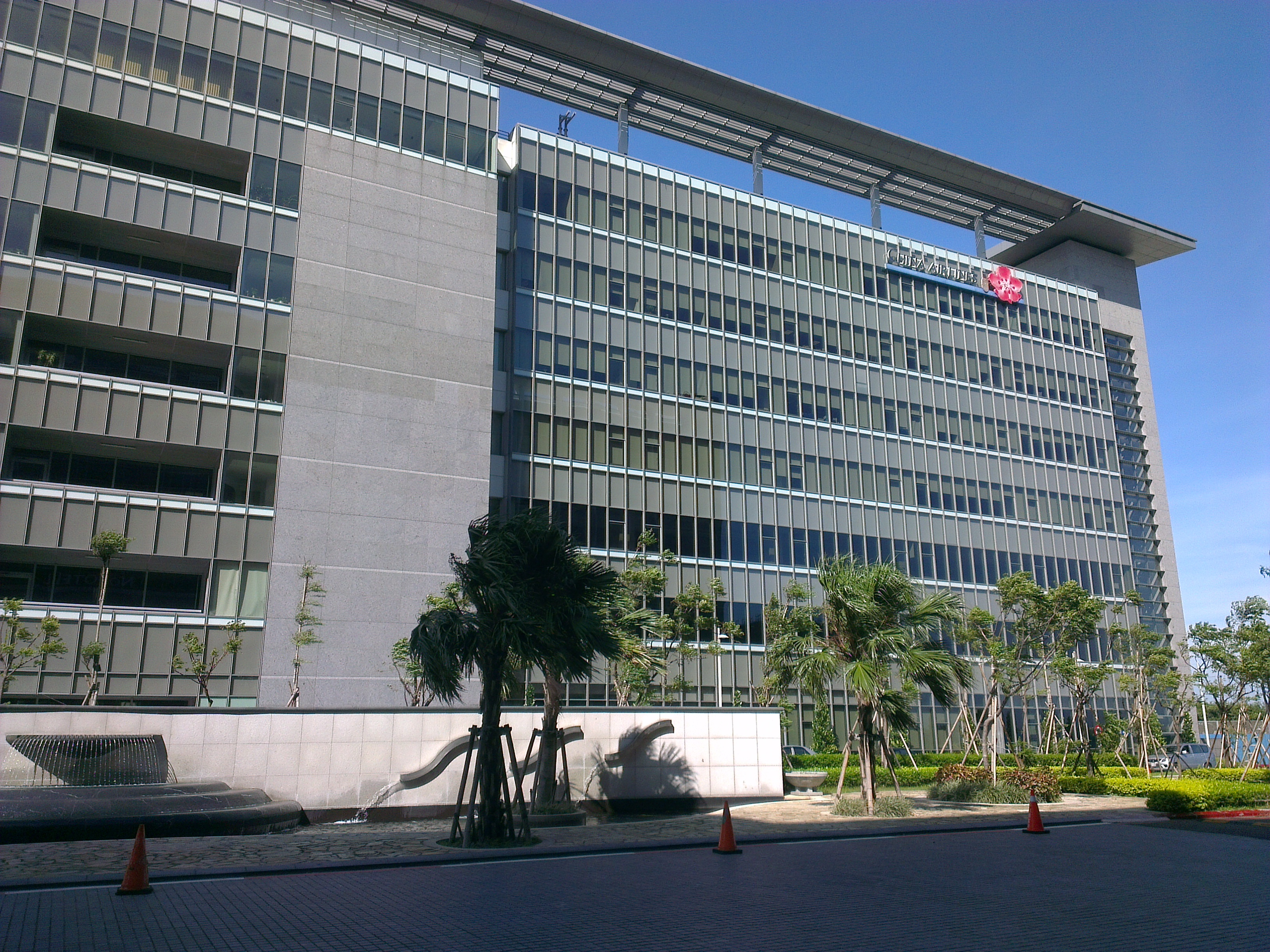
CAL Park, the headquarters for China Airlines

China Airlines has its headquarters, CAL Park, on the grounds of Taiwan Taoyuan International Airport. CAL Park, located at the airport entrance forms a straight line with Terminal 1, Terminal 2, and the future Terminal 3.

=== Airport hotels ===
Located adjacent to the convention center is the Hyatt Regency Taoyuan International Airport. The 360-room hotel is equipped with restaurants, recreation and fitness centers, and a hair salon and spa.

=== Aviation museum ===
The Chung Cheng Aviation Museum was located in the south-eastern area of the airport between the main freeway entrance and the terminals. It was built in 1981 by Boeing under CAA contract. Many retired Republic of China Air Force fighters are represented here. Its purpose is to preserve aviation history and provide public understanding of the civil aviation industry. It is now currently closed due to the expansion and construction of the new Terminal 3.

== Awards ==
- Airport Service Quality (Airports Council International) Best Airport in 15–25 million passengers level (2008)

== Future developments ==
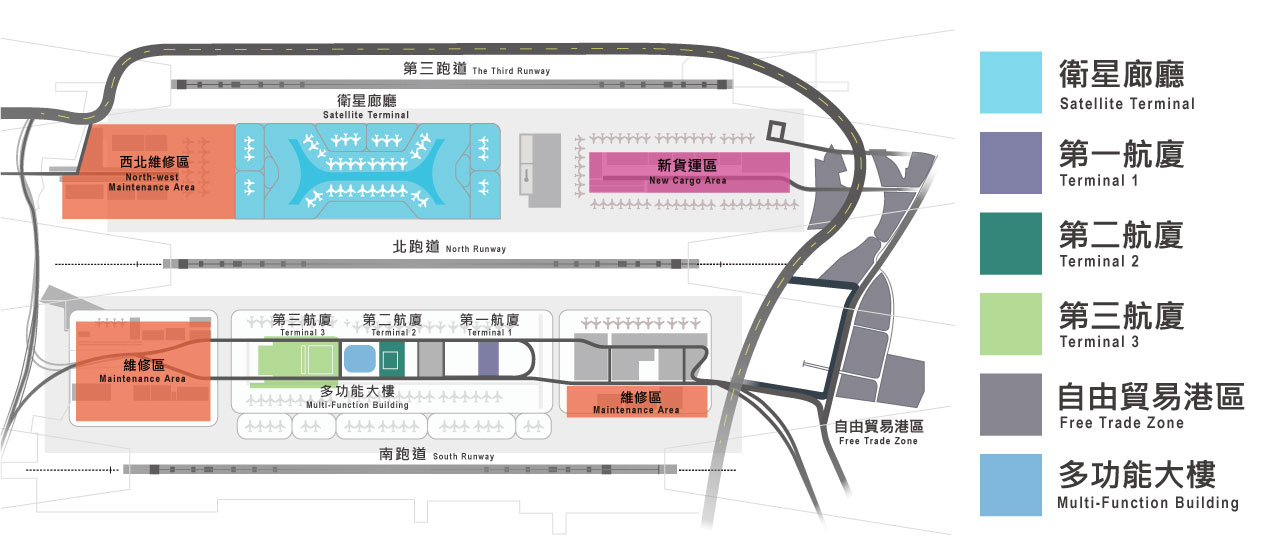
Planned future layout

Taoyuan International Airport is undergoing major facility-upgrading and expansion plans. While the South runway (05R/23L) just completed its renovation in January 2015, construction started at the North runway (05L/23R) in March 2015. The runway renovations involve upgrading the runway to Category III and improving the surface conditions. On the other hand, two Terminal 2 gates, C2 and D6, had additional jet bridges installed to accommodate the A380 aircraft. After the runway and jetbridge upgrades, the airport will be able to allow regular A380 operations, with likely carriers being Emirates, China Southern Airlines and Singapore Airlines.

Plans are also underway for the construction of Terminal 3, satellite terminal, and the third runway. Terminal 3 is designed by Rogers Stirk Harbour + Partners and is expected to have an annual capacity of 45 million passengers. Specific plans for the satellite terminal have not been announced. The third runway is expected to be completed by 2030.

The master plan of the airport is the Taoyuan Aerotropolis project, an urban plan aimed at creating an industrial area surrounding Taoyuan Airport. The aerotropolis will take advantage of the competitive local infrastructure to attract developments and help stimulate economic growth. The total area, including the "yolk" airport area and the "white" area, will exceed 6845 hectares. The Terminal 3 and third runway plans are all part of the "yolk" area projects, with the projected expected to be completed by 2023. However, the project has been delayed due to land resumption controversies.

=== Terminal 3 construction ===
The still-under construction terminal 3 at Taiwan Taoyuan International Airport, as seen from the south observation deck

In October 2015, it was announced that RSHP won the bid to design the 640,000 square meter terminal. Structures will include a processor (main terminal building), two concourses, and a multi-functional building to connect the terminal with Terminal 2. The processor will have a wave-like roof structure from which lights will be hung. The lights will move up and down to reflect the flow of passengers. Terminal 3 was initially expected to be completed in 2020 and will be able to handle up to 50 million passengers per year, thus increasing the overall yearly capacity of the airport to over 90 million passengers. It is now scheduled to be complete by 2026. The construction project involves South Korean company Samsung C&T and Taiwan's RSEA.

== Accidents and incidents ==
- 16 February 1998: China Airlines Flight 676, an Airbus A300-600R (registered B-1814), was approaching Chiang Kai-shek International Airport after its flight from Ngurah Rai International Airport, Indonesia, crashed into a residential area while landing in poor weather, killing all 196 people on board and six on the ground.
- 31 October 2000: Singapore Airlines Flight 006, a Boeing 747-400 (registered 9V-SPK), crashed into construction equipment, after attempting to take off on the wrong runway, killing 83 of the 179 occupants aboard.

== See also ==
- Transportation in Taiwan
- Taoyuan Air Base
