= Hyatt Regency Taoyuan International Airport =

Airport hotel in Dayuan, Taoyuan City, Taiwan

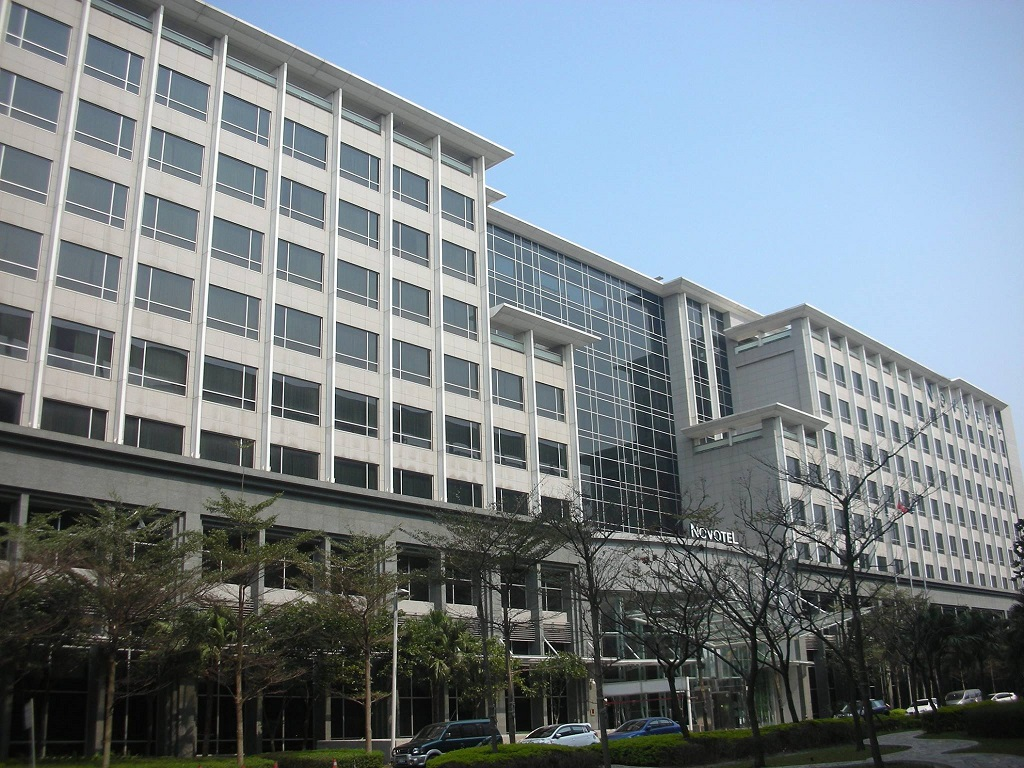
- Interactive map of the Hyatt Regency Taoyuan International Airport area
- Former names: Novotel Taipei Taoyuan International Airport
- Hotel chain: Hyatt Regency

General information
- Type: hotel
- Location: Dayuan, Taoyuan City, Taiwan
- Coordinates: 25°04′08.0″N 121°13′16.9″E
- Opened: November 2009 (Novotel); January 2025 (Hyatt Regency)

Other information
- Number of rooms: 360

Website
- Official website

The Hyatt Regency Taoyuan International Airport (until January 2025 Novotel Taipei Taoyuan International Airport) is a hotel in Dayuan District, Taoyuan City, Taiwan. It consists of 360 rooms. It is accessible from Airport Hotel Station of Taoyuan Airport MRT.

== History ==
Opened in November 2009, as Novotel, the hotel was the first venture of Accor in Taiwan. On 25 June 2014, a meeting between the Minister of the Mainland Affairs Council of the Republic of China, and Zhang Zhijun, the Minister of the Taiwan Affairs Office of the People's Republic of China took place at the hotel.

In January 2025, the hotel was rebranded as Hyatt Regency's first hotel in Taiwan.

== See also ==
- Monarch Skyline Hotel
- Sheraton Taoyuan Hotel
