= Taoyuan, Taiwan =

Municipality in Taiwan

Taoyuan City 桃園市 (Note: In local languages: Traditional Chinese script: 桃園市; Mandarin Pinyin: Táoyuán Shì; Hokkien: Thô-hn̂g Tshī; Sixian Hakka: Tǒ-iěn Sii; Hailu Hakka: To-rhan Shi^{+})
- Special municipality
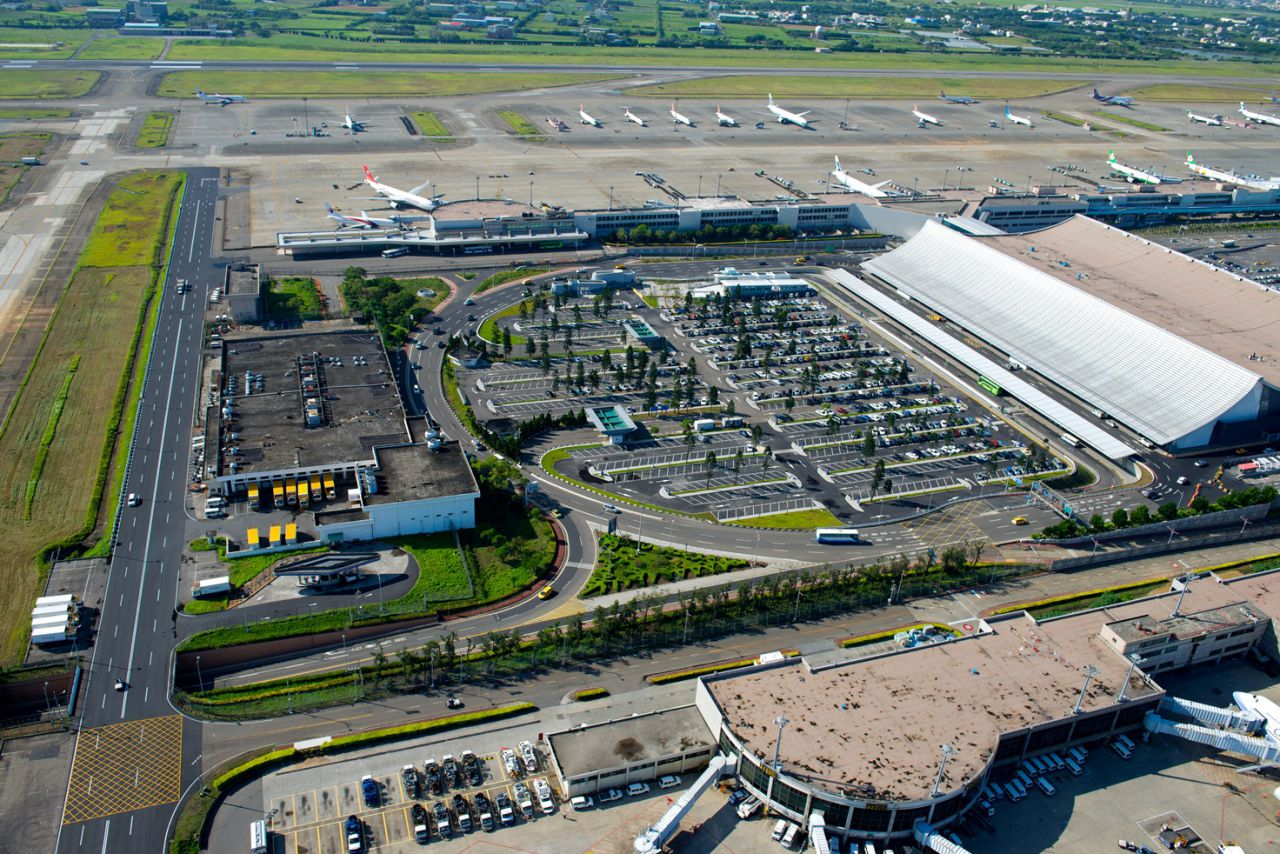
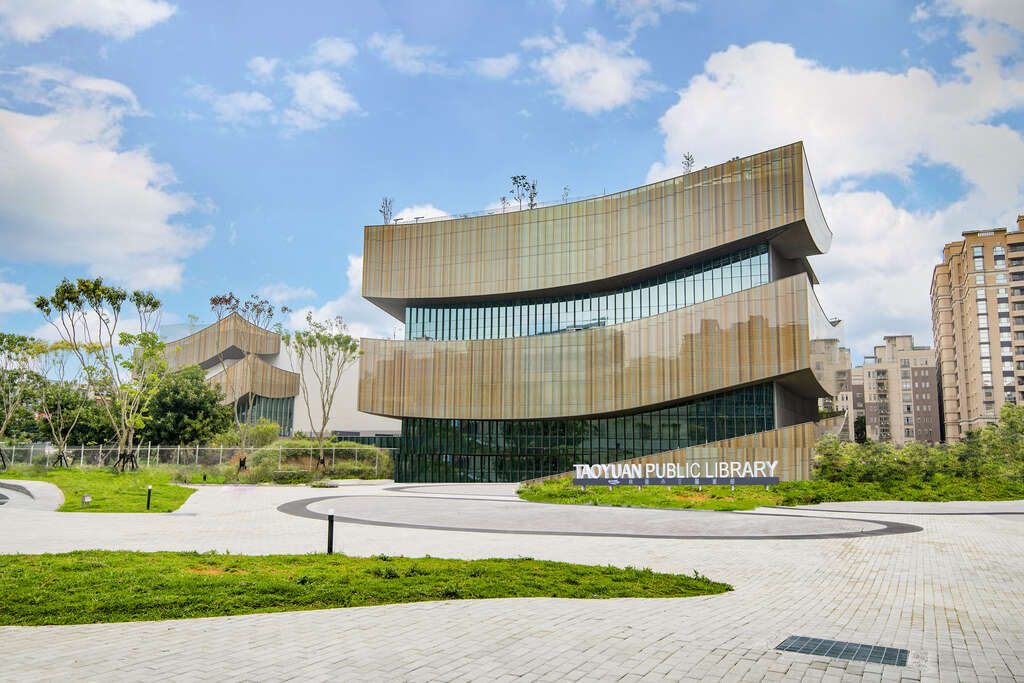
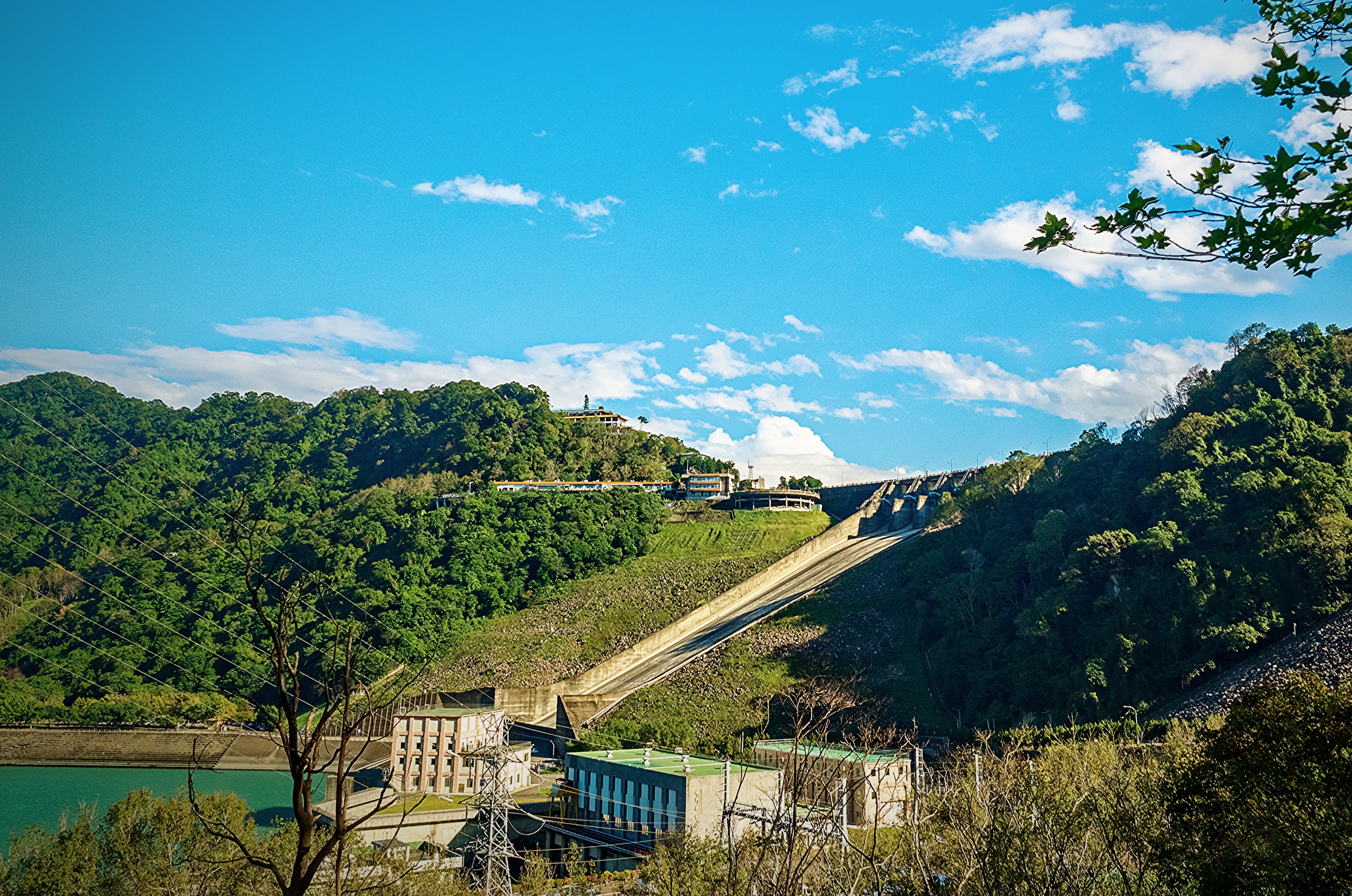
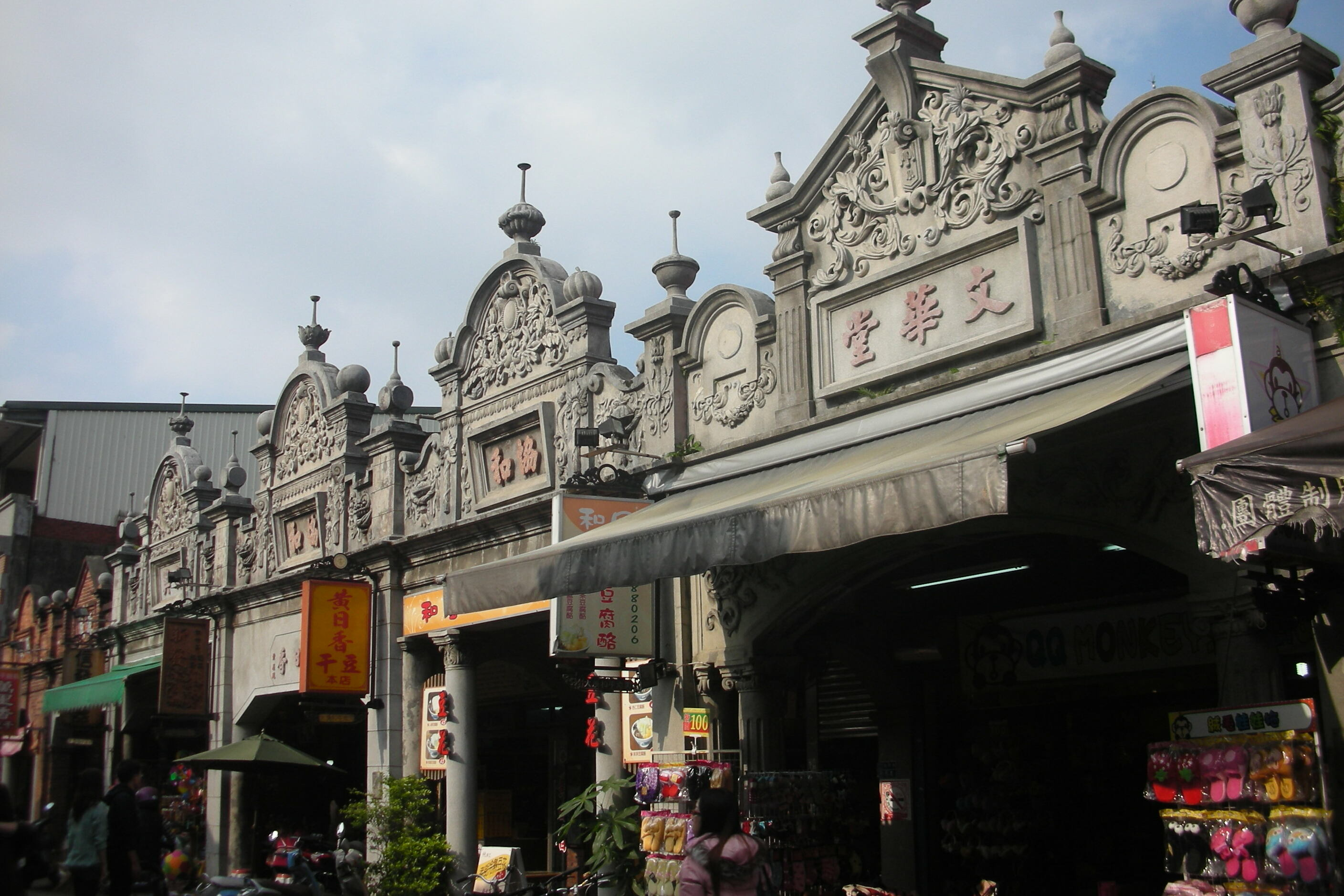
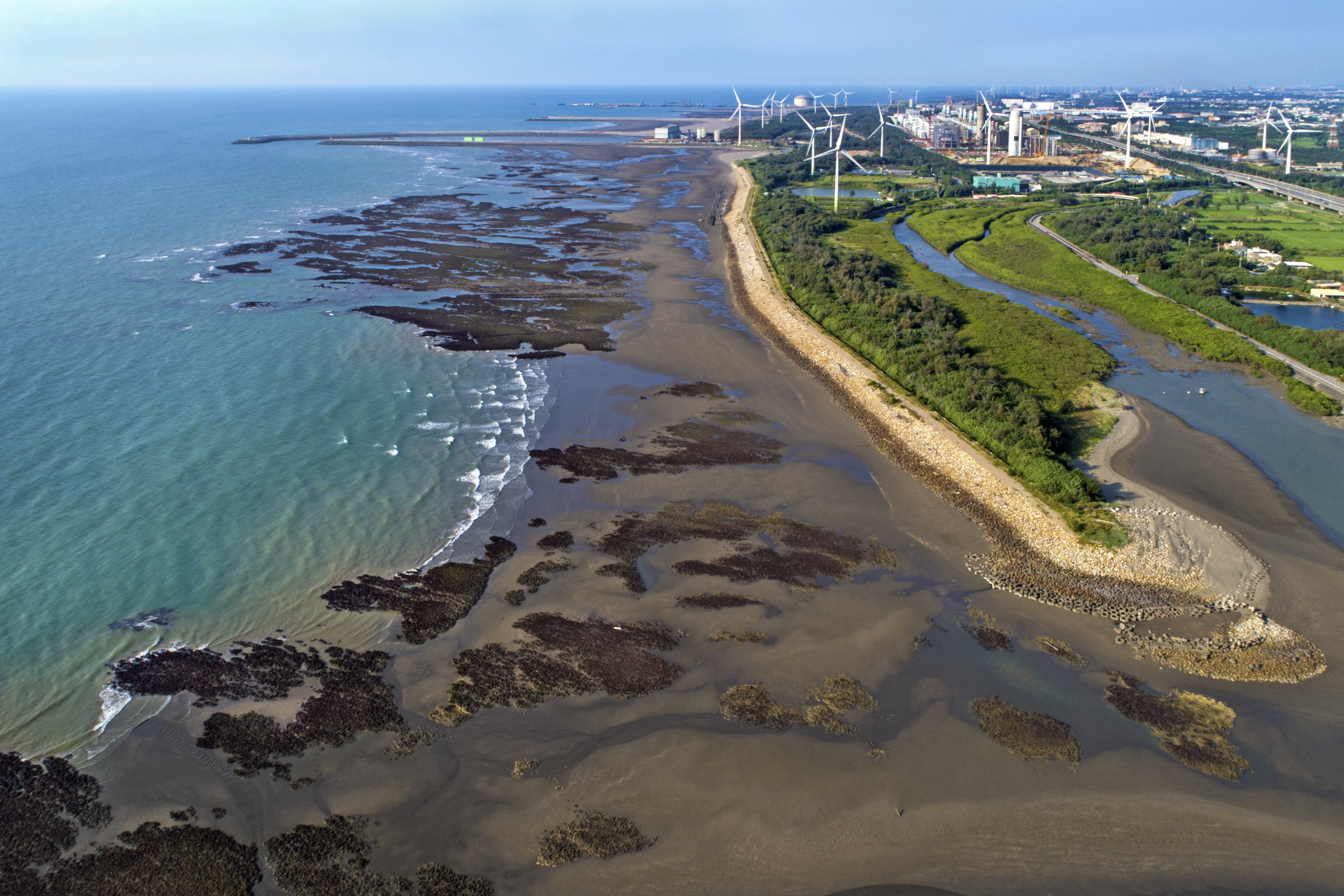
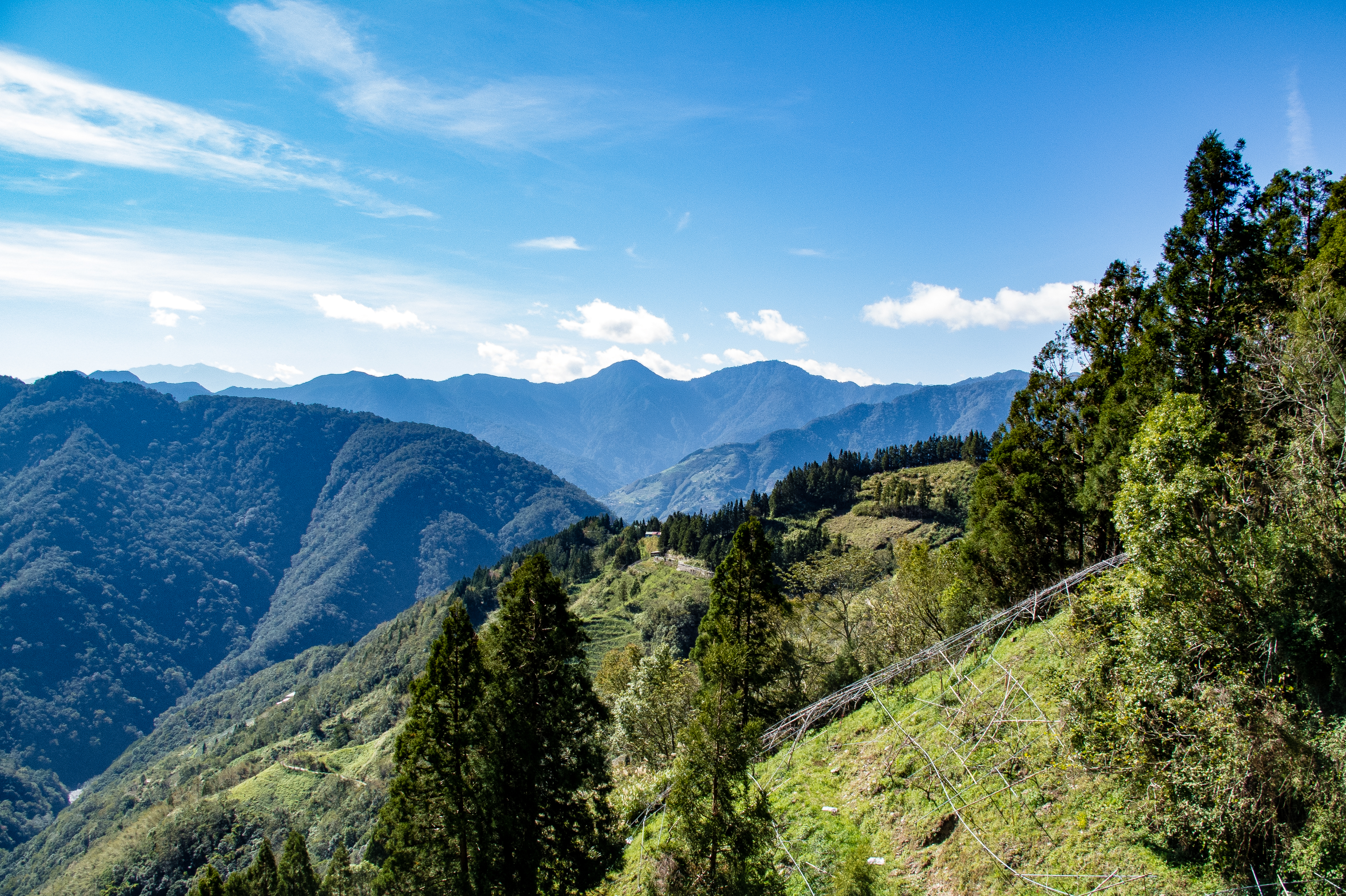
- Qingpu Special District skyline Taoyuan International Airport Taoyuan Main Public Library Shihmen Reservoir Daxi Old Street Guanxin Algal Reefs Lala Mountain

- Flag Logo

- Coordinates: 24°59′28.6″N 121°18′51.58″E
- Country: Republic of China (Taiwan)
- Seat: Taoyuan District
- Districts: 13: Taoyuan; Zhongli; Daxi; Yangmei; Luzhu; Dayuan; Guishan; Bade; Longtan; Pingzhen; Xinwu; Guanyin; Fuxing

Government
  - Body: Taoyuan City Government; Taoyuan City Council
  - Mayor: Chang San-cheng (KMT)

Area
  - Special municipality: 1,220.95 km^{2} (471.41 sq mi)
  - Urban: 1,140 km^{2} (440 sq mi)
  - Rank: 14 of 22

Population (March 2023)
  - Special municipality: 2,293,509
  - Rank: 5 of 22
  - Density: 1,878.46/km^{2} (4,865.20/sq mi)
  - Urban (Note: Refers to the Taipei-Taoyuan urban area.): 8,535,000
  - Urban density: 7,490/km^{2} (19,400/sq mi)
- Time zone: UTC+8 (National Standard Time)
- Postal code: 320-338
- ISO 3166 code: TW-TAO
- Bird: Formosan blue magpie (Urocissa caerulea)
- Flower: Peach blossom
- Tree: Peach tree
- Website: eng.tycg.gov.tw (in English)

Taoyuan City
- Traditional Chinese: 桃園市
- Simplified Chinese: 桃园市
Transcriptions
Standard Mandarin
- Hanyu Pinyin: Táoyuán Shì
- Bopomofo: ㄊㄠˊ ㄩㄢˊ ㄕˋ
- Gwoyeu Romatzyh: Taur'yuan Shyh
- Wade–Giles: Tʻao^{2}-yüan^{2} Shih^{4}
- Tongyong Pinyin: Táoyuán Shìh
- Yale Romanization: Táuywán Shr̀
- MPS2: Táuyuán Shr̀
- IPA: [tʰǎʊ.ɥɛ̌n ʂɻ̩̂]
Hakka
- Pha̍k-fa-sṳ: Thò-yèn-sṳ
Southern Min
- Hokkien POJ: Thô-hn̂g-chhī
- Tâi-lô: Thô-hn̂g-tshī

Taoyuan(/ˌtaʊjuːˈɛn/) is a special municipality located in northwestern Taiwan, neighboring New Taipei City to the north-east, Yilan County to the south-east, and Hsinchu County to the south-west. Taoyuan District is the seat of the municipal government and which, along with Zhongli District, forms a large metropolitan area. Taoyuan developed from a satellite city of Taipei metropolitan area to become the fourth-largest metropolitan area, and fifth-largest populated city in Taiwan. "Taoyuan" literally means "peach garden" in Chinese, since the area used to have many peach trees. Formerly a county, Taoyuan became the latest new founding special municipality in 2014.

Taoyuan City is home to many industrial parks and tech company headquarters. Due to the city's proximity to Taipei, and the lower cost of living, Taoyuan has had the fastest population growth of any city in Taiwan in recent decades. The city is also home to 116,000 foreign workers, with many coming from Southeast Asia and working in factories or as household caregivers. Taoyuan International Airport, which serves the capital, Taipei and the rest of northern Taiwan, is located in this city.

== History ==
=== Early history ===
In ancient times, the Taoyuan plateau was the home of the Taiwanese plains aborigines. In prehistory, the Ketagalan people settled in Nankan. In the early years of Dutch colonization, Spanish colonization, and Zheng He of the Ming Dynasty, there were no large-scale cultivation or industrial activities. During the Qing era, a number of people from Fujian Province and Guangdong province began to immigrate into present-day Taoyuan to develop and farm the land. They planted peach trees, which, when fully bloomed in spring, were so beautiful that the people named the land Toahong (Chinese: 桃仔園; pinyin: Táozǐyuán; Pe̍h-ōe-jī: Thô-á-hn̂g; lit. 'peach orchard').

=== Empire of Japan ===
In November 1901, during Japanese era, a local administrative office, Toshien Chō (Japanese: 桃仔園廳), was established in the area, and renamed Tōen Chō (桃園廳) in 1905. In 1920, the Tōen area was incorporated into Shinchiku Prefecture.

During the Japanese era, the staged migration policy caused Taoyuan to develop into a city with a variety of cultures. For example, temples and worship paths (currently the Taoyuan Martyrs Shrine) symbolized cultural systems. Butokuden (武德殿) were used to represent military systems, and the old Taoyuan City Office signified political systems.

=== Republic of China ===
After the transfer from Japan to the Republic of China, the present day-area of Taoyuan City was incorporated under Hsinchu County. In 1950, Taoyuan County was established by separating it from Hsinchu County. On 21 April 1971, Taoyuan City was made the county seat of Taoyuan County. It had 6 cities, 1 urban township and 6 rural townships.

In June 2009, the Executive Yuan approved the plan to upgrade Taoyuan from a county to a special municipality. On 25 December 2014, Taoyuan County was upgraded into a special municipality of Taoyuan City (桃園市).

== Geography ==
Taoyuan is located approximately 40 km (25 mi) southwest of Taipei, in northern Taiwan, and occupies 1,220 km^{2} (470 sq mi). It is made up of low-lying plains, interconnected mountains and plateaus. Its shape has a long and narrow southeast-to-northwest trend, with the southeast in the Xueshan Range and the far end on the shores of the Taiwan Strait.

There are many irrigation ponds at Taoyuan Plateau, which caused Taoyuan to earn the nickname "Thousand-pond Township" (千塘之鄉).

=== Climate ===
Taoyuan has a humid subtropical climate, with mild to warm winters and hot summers, typical of northern Taiwan.

Climate data for Taoyuan (Taoyuan District) (2008–2020 normals, extremes 2008–present)
Month	Jan	Feb	Mar	Apr	May	Jun	Jul	Aug	Sep	Oct	Nov	Dec	Year
Record high °C (°F)	28.8 (83.8)	30.2 (86.4)	32.6 (90.7)	34.8 (94.6)	36.3 (97.3)	38.1 (100.6)	39.0 (102.2)	39.2 (102.6)	39.8 (103.6)	36.1 (97.0)	32.9 (91.2)	29.8 (85.6)	39.8 (103.6)
Mean daily maximum °C (°F)	19.2 (66.6)	20.0 (68.0)	22.2 (72.0)	26.1 (79.0)	29.7 (85.5)	32.5 (90.5)	34.6 (94.3)	34.1 (93.4)	32.3 (90.1)	28.0 (82.4)	24.8 (76.6)	20.3 (68.5)	27.0 (80.6)
Daily mean °C (°F)	15.8 (60.4)	16.2 (61.2)	18.2 (64.8)	21.8 (71.2)	23.9 (75.0)	28.3 (82.9)	29.9 (85.8)	29.5 (85.1)	27.9 (82.2)	24.4 (75.9)	21.6 (70.9)	17.2 (63.0)	22.9 (73.2)
Mean daily minimum °C (°F)	13.3 (55.9)	13.6 (56.5)	15.1 (59.2)	18.5 (65.3)	22.3 (72.1)	25.0 (77.0)	26.6 (79.9)	26.3 (79.3)	24.9 (76.8)	21.9 (71.4)	19.0 (66.2)	14.8 (58.6)	20.1 (68.2)
Record low °C (°F)	2.9 (37.2)	5.0 (41.0)	7.7 (45.9)	7.5 (45.5)	13.5 (56.3)	18.1 (64.6)	21.5 (70.7)	22.6 (72.7)	16.4 (61.5)	12.5 (54.5)	7.8 (46.0)	6.1 (43.0)	2.9 (37.2)
Average precipitation mm (inches)	88.6 (3.49)	152.2 (5.99)	155.6 (6.13)	147.4 (5.80)	214.0 (8.43)	277.4 (10.92)	135.9 (5.35)	227.0 (8.94)	167.6 (6.60)	101.0 (3.98)	64.1 (2.52)	84.2 (3.31)	1,815 (71.46)
Average precipitation days	12.1	12.3	13.0	13.0	12.2	11.9	8.1	11.4	9.4	9.9	9.6	11.2	134.1
Average relative humidity (%)	76.6	78.9	75.6	73.8	74.7	73.5	67.8	70.8	70.9	73.5	75.9	76.8	74.1
Source 1: Central Weather Administration
Source 2: Atmospheric Science Research and Application Databank (precipitation 1991–2020, precipitation days and humidity 2000–2024)

== Ethnic composition ==
Historical population
Year	Pop.	±%
1946	299,299	—
1950	343,160	+14.7%
1955	406,522	+18.5%
1960	489,676	+20.5%
1965	588,786	+20.2%
1970	726,750	+23.4%
1975	861,792	+18.6%
1980	1,052,800	+22.2%
1985	1,211,249	+15.1%
1990	1,355,175	+11.9%
1995	1,524,127	+12.5%
2000	1,732,617	+13.7%
2005	1,911,161	+10.3%
2010	2,002,060	+4.8%
2015	2,105,780	+5.2%
2020	2,268,807	+7.7%
2025	2,355,106	+3.8%
來源：: 1. "桃園縣現住人口 (1946-1951)" (pdf). 桃園縣統計要覽 (Report). Vol. 中華民國40年度(41. 6). 桃園縣政府主計室. June 1952. pp. 23–30 – via 政府統計資訊網 (國家圖書館).; 2. "桃園縣現住戶口數 (1950-1978)" (pdf). 桃園縣統計要覽 (Report). Vol. 中華民國67年(68.12). 桃園縣政府主計室. December 1979. p. 13 – via 政府統計資訊網 (國家圖書館).; 3. "縣市人口按性別及五齡組". 內政部戶政司.

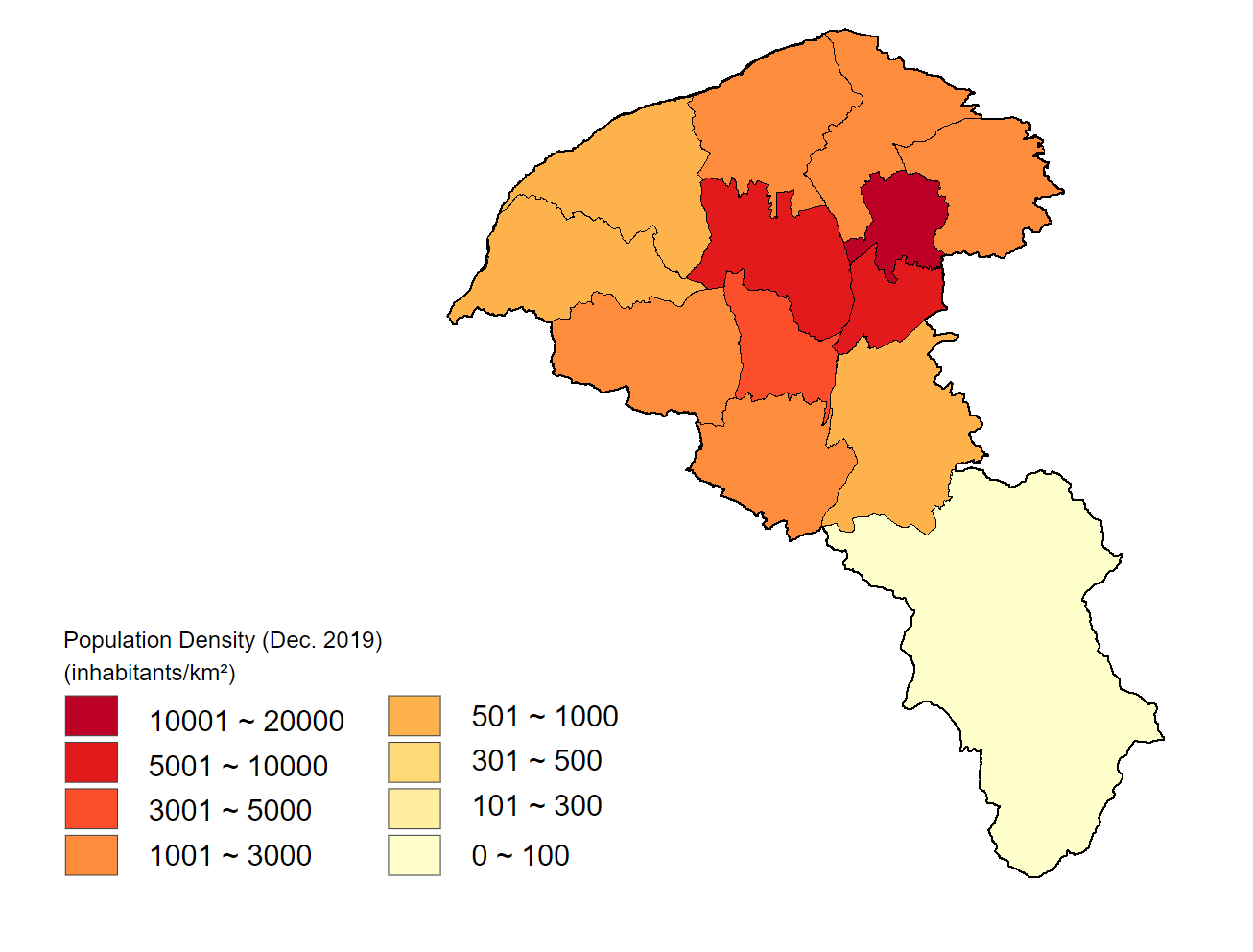
Population density map of Taoyuan City

View source data.

=== Han Chinese ===
==== Hoklo ====
As of most of the cities and urban towns of Taiwan, Minnan people (Hoklos) are one of the largest ethnic groups of Taoyuan, most of whom live in northern Taoyuan (北桃園) which comprises the northern districts of Taoyuan, including Taoyuan city centre, Bade, Daxi, Dayuan, Guishan and Luzhu, and the city seat of government, Taoyuan District citycentre.

==== Hakka ====
The Hakka are the second-largest ethnic group in the city after the Minnan ethnicity (Hoklo) who won against the Hakkas in clan wars moved to the poor mountainous regions in southern Taoyuan, most of the Hakka people live in the rural peasant village areas of southern Taoyuan (南桃園), which includes Zhongli, Pingzhen, Yangmei, Longtan, Guanyin and Xinwu districts. With more than 785,000 Hakka people, Taoyuan hosts the largest Hakka population among all of Taiwan's administrative divisions.

==== Waishengren ====
After the Chinese Civil War, many people from mainland China (unaffectionately referred to as "Waishengren") settled in the then-Taoyuan County after the retreat of the nationalist government in 1949. Most of them live in military dependents' villages in Zhongli, Pingzhen and Guishan. Longgang is well known for its immigrants from Yunnan, featuring many Yunnan-style restaurants.

=== Indigenous peoples ===
Most Taiwanese indigenous peoples in the city live in Fuxing District, with most of them belonging to the Atayal people. Outside of the Fuxing District, Taoyuan is the one Special Municipality of Taiwan that has no Aboriginal populations, appearing on related maps as empty.

== Economy ==
Taoyuan is one of Taiwan's top industrial and technological cities. High-tech companies including Quanta, MiTAC, Inotera, Nanya Technology, HTC, CPT and AU Optronics have all opted to build or expand their factories in Taoyuan. Taoyuan has now become a bastion of electronics and semiconductor manufacturing. Over 200 of Taiwan's top 500 manufacturing companies have factories in Taoyuan. Taoyuan has also led Taiwan in terms of industrial output for nine straight years.

There are now 29 registered industrial areas with 3,696 ha (9,130 acres) of non-urban industrial land and 3,131 ha (7,740 acres) of urban industrial land. There are over 6,827 ha (16,870 acres) of land available for factories and industrial use in the city, representing the fact that Taoyuan's development bureau is based on industry and commerce. There are also 9 sites (57 ha; 140 acres) for mixed industrial-commercial use, the most of any county and city in Taiwan.

On 26 March 2010, China Airlines (Taiwan's government-owned airline) moved into its new headquarters on the grounds of Taipei Taoyuan International Airport and in Dayuan Township in Taoyuan County (now Dayuan District, Taoyuan). EVA Air maintains its headquarters in Luzhu District. Evergreen Airlines Services Corporation, Evergreen Aviation Technologies Corp., and Evergreen Air Cargo Services Corporation, subsidiaries of Evergreen Group, are headquartered in Dayuan.

On 25 December 2016, The Asia Silicon Valley Development Agency (ASVDA) was inaugurated in northern Taoyuan City, in a governmental effort to foster innovation, promote the Internet of Things (IoT) sector and attract top-class technology talent. The Asia Silicon Valley Development Plan aimed to transform Taiwan into an R&D hub for the IoT sector as well as a global center of entrepreneurship.

=== Industry and environment ===
A former RCA facility is located in the city. The RCA facility was the source of significant trichloroethylene contamination.

== Tourism ==
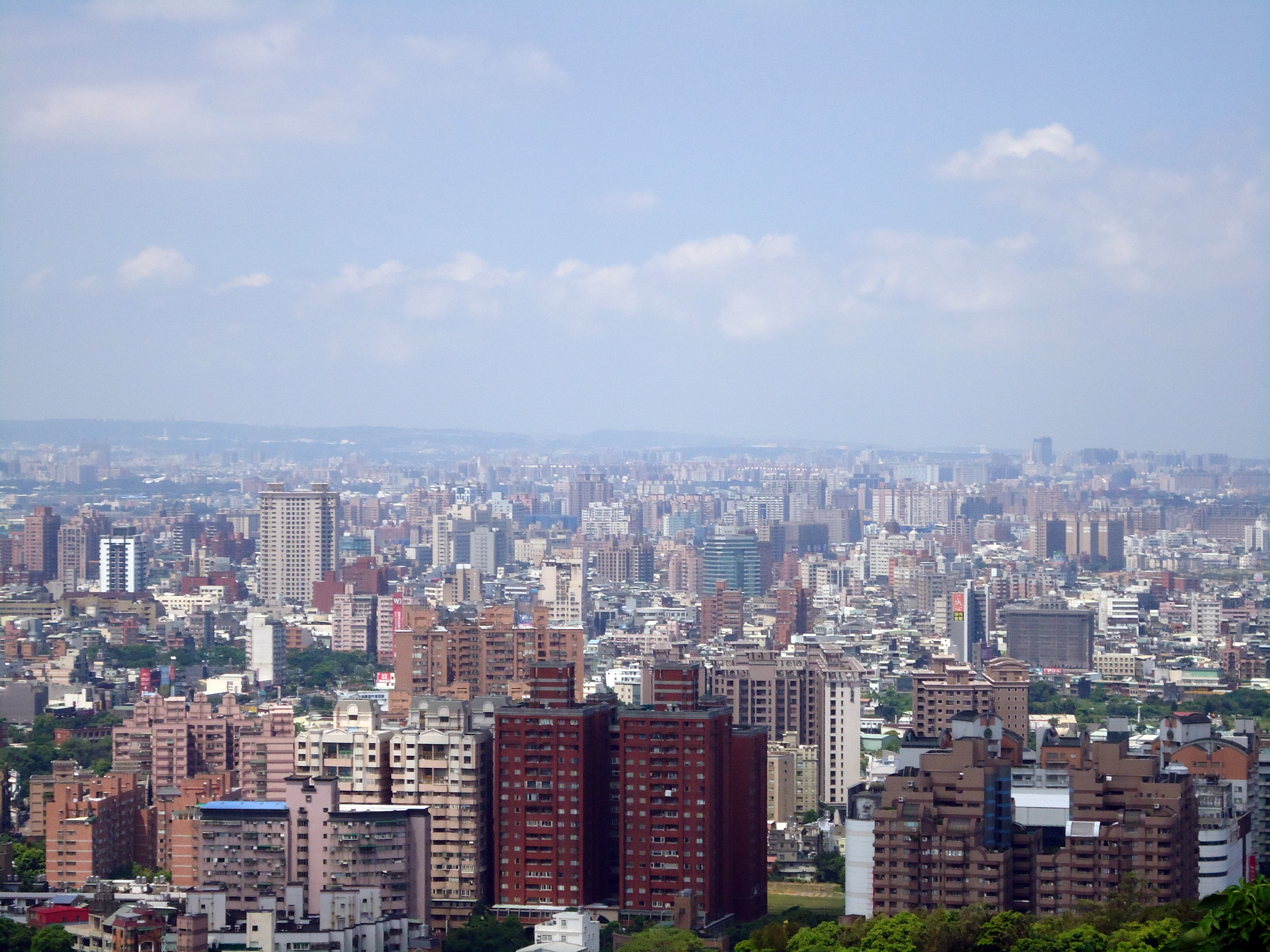
Overview of downtown Taoyuan

=== Historical sites ===
Daxi Old Street
Daxi Old Street is one of the more famous Taiwanese old streets. It used to be a bustling hub for camphor and the tea trade, filled with diverse stores with façades designed in a Baroque style. The street also has the Daxi Wood Art Ecomuseum, which includes buildings such as Daxi Butokuden and Lee Teng-fan's Ancient Residence.
Furen Temple
Furen Temple was established in 1813, dedicated to Kai Zhang Sheng Wang and the temple is located along Daxi Old Street in Daxi District.
Tianhou Temple
Tianhou Temple was established in 1826, and is located in Xinwu District. The temple built a magnificent bronze statue of Goddess Mazu in 2002, which is the 2nd-tallest statue of Mazu in Taiwan and the 3rd-tallest in the world.
Taoyuan Martyrs' Shrine
Taoyuan Martyrs' Shrine is one of the best-kept Shinto shrines outside Japan.

=== Nature attractions ===
Shimen Reservoir
Shihmen Reservoir is one of Taiwan's major reservoirs. Once the largest water conservancy project in Southeast Asia, visitors may find many restaurants open near the reservoir serving fresh reservoir fish delicacies. There is also a three-kilometre-long (1.9 mi) bikeway surrounding the back pond. Shimen Reservoir provides almost all of the water in Taoyuan, as well as to New Taipei City's Xinzhuang, Banqiao, and Linkou districts.
Lala Mountain
Lala Mountain is one of Taiwan's "natural protection zones," including 500- to 2,800-year-old divine trees and the "No. 5 Divine Tree," which predates Confucius.

=== Museums and art centers ===
Taoyuan Arts Center
Taoyuan Arts Center is the main performance center in Taoyuan, located in Taoyuan Zhongzheng Arts and Cultural Business District.
Hengshan Calligraphy Art Center
Hengshan Calligraphy Art Center is the first official art museum in Taiwan with the theme of calligraphy.

=== Others ===
Cihu Mausoleum
Cihu Mausoleum is the final resting place of the former president of the Republic of China, Chiang Kai-shek.
Window on China Theme Park
The Window on China Theme Park is one of Taiwan's earliest theme parks, established in 1984. The park consists of three areas: Mini World, Water Park, and Amusement Park. The park features numerous small-scale replicas of many famous world landmarks.
Longgang Mosque
The Longgang Mosque in Zhongli District is Taiwan's fifth mosque. It was originally built in 1967 to serve an area with many Taiwanese Muslims.
Taoyuan Aquarium Xpark
Xpark is a public aquarium operated by Yokohama Hakkeijima. The Taiwanese sea-themed tank "Formosa" is popular.

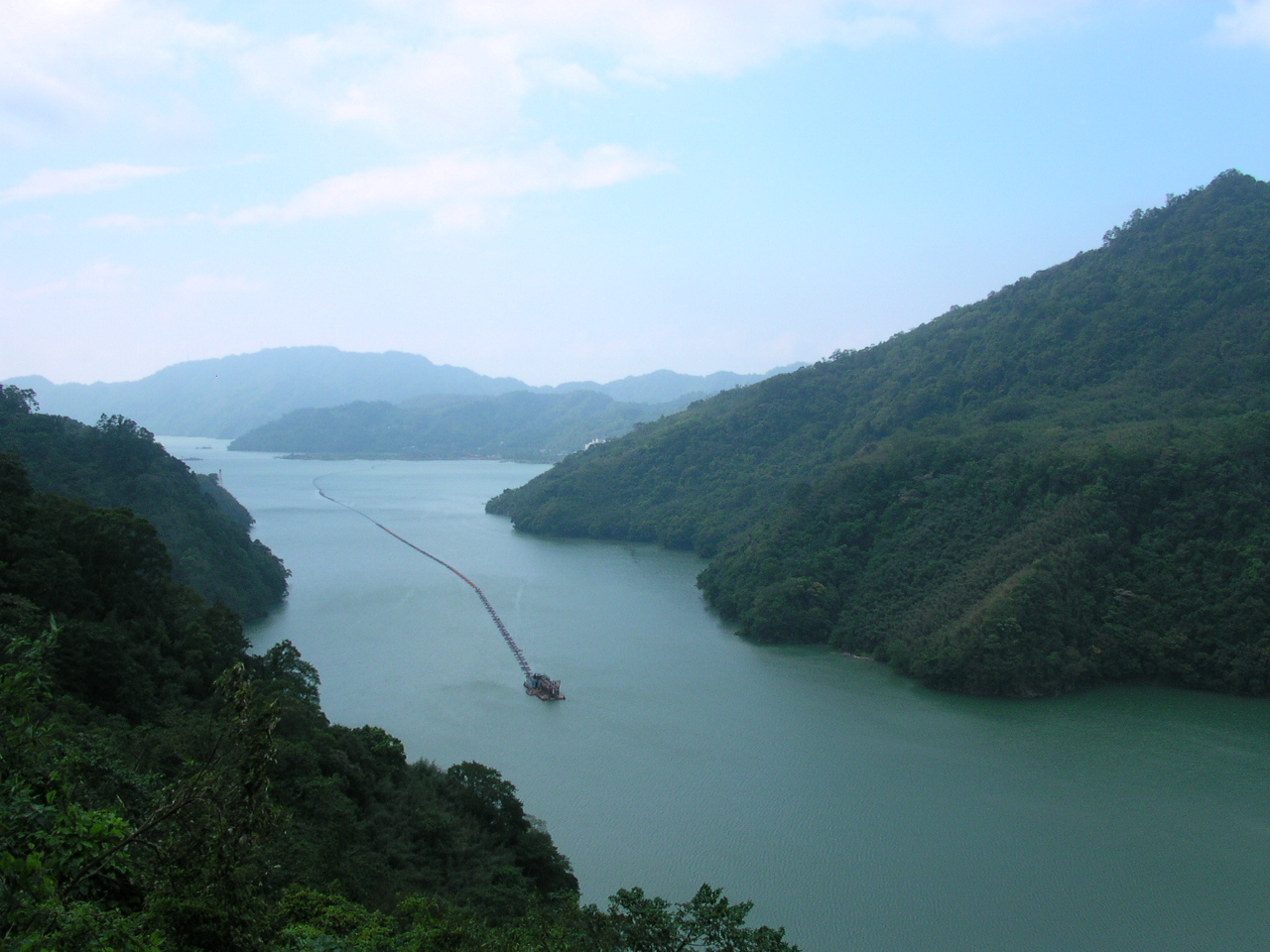
Shihmen Reservoir

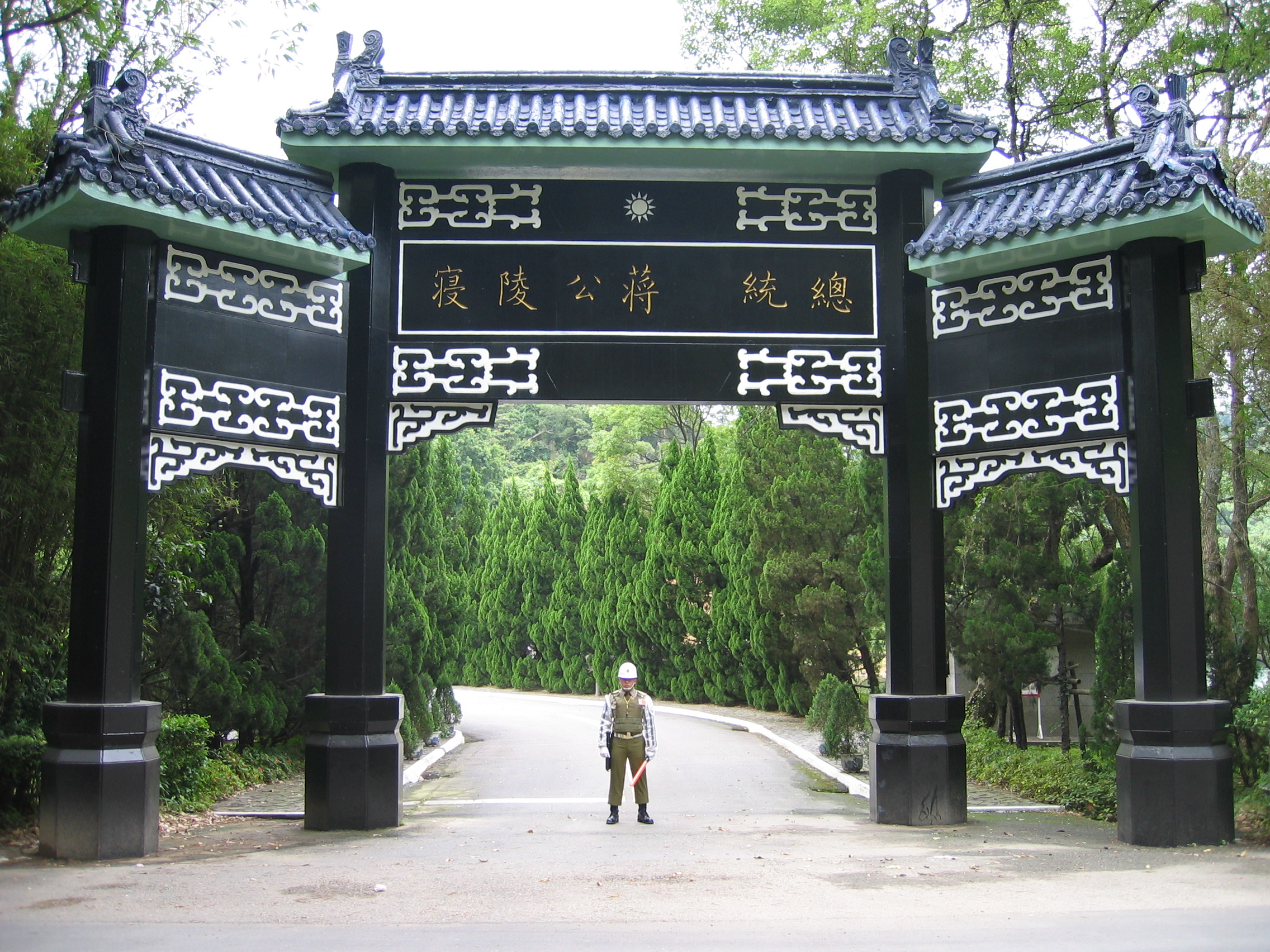
Cihu Mausoleum of Chiang Kai-shek

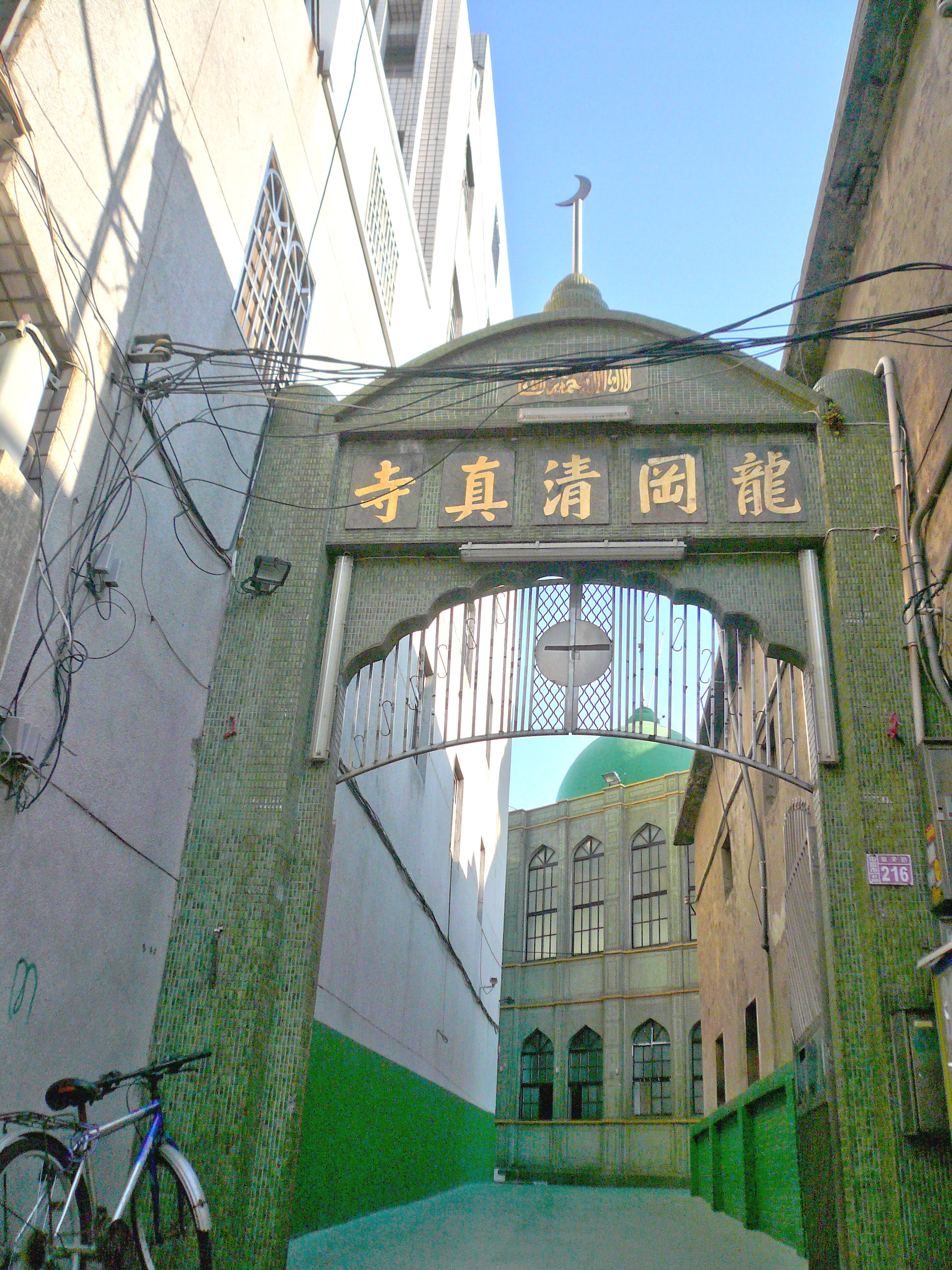
Longgang Mosque

== Government and politics ==
Taoyuan City Government

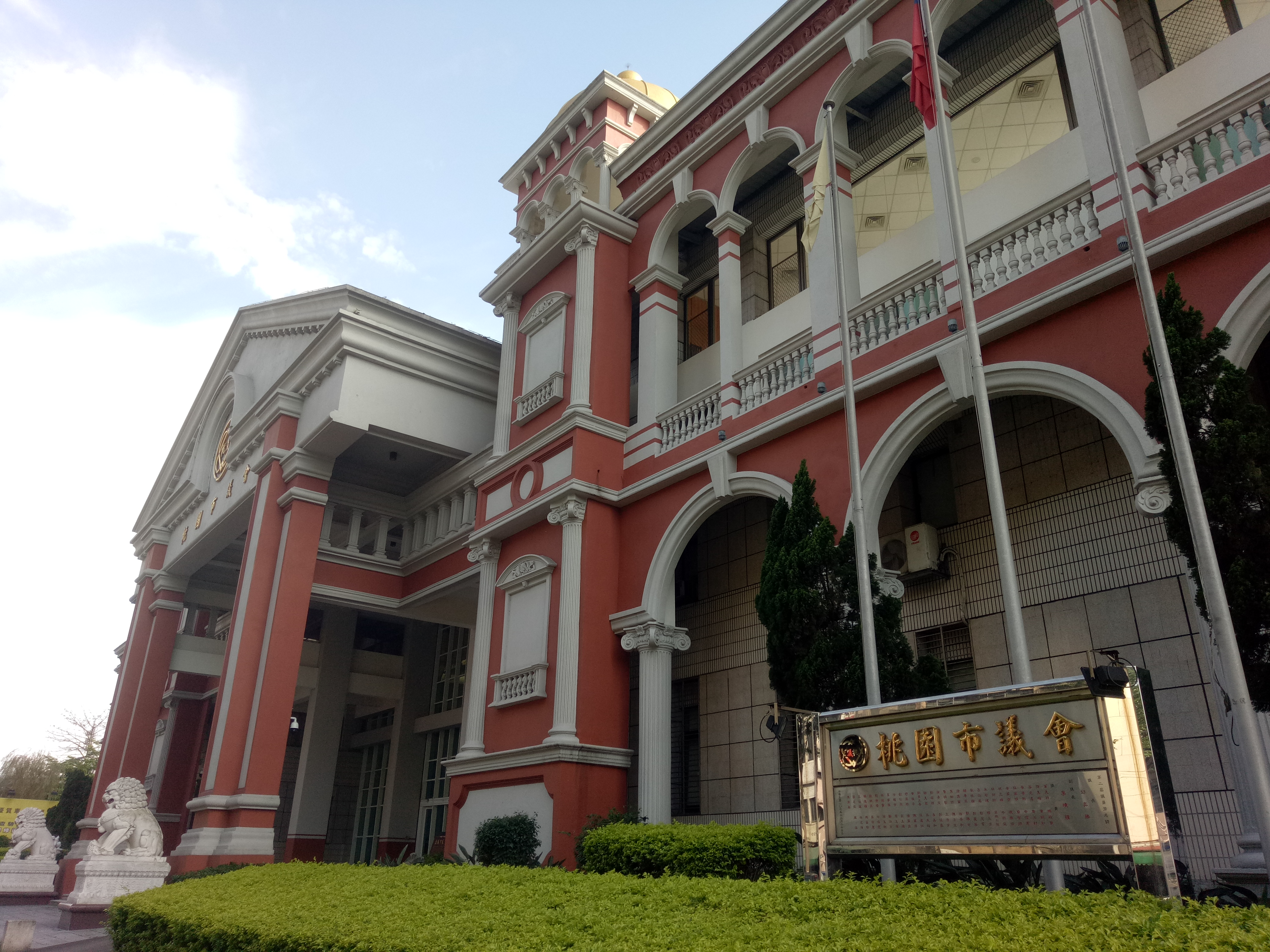
Taoyuan City Council

The Taoyuan City Government is the municipal government of Taoyuan. The Taoyuan City Council is the elected municipal council of Taoyuan, the council composes of 60 councillors elected once every four years by single non-transferable vote.

=== Mayor ===
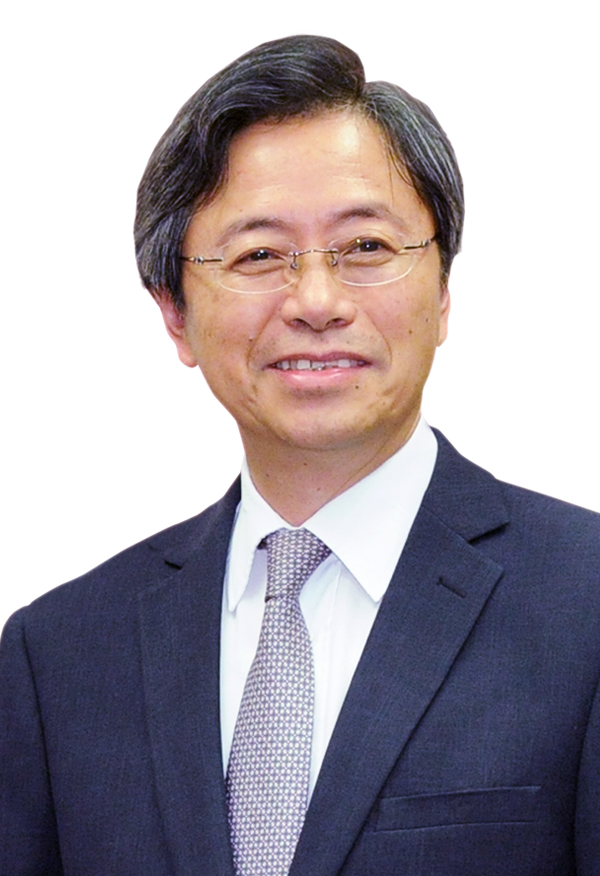
Chang San-cheng, the incumbent Mayor of Taoyuan.

In 2001, Eric Chu of the Kuomintang defeated Democratic Progressive Party incumbent Peng Shao-Chin in the race for Taoyuan County magistrate. Peng had inherited the magistrate position after Annette Lu vacated the post to serve as vice president. Chu ran for re-election in 2005 and defeated DPP challenger Pao-Ching Cheng, CEO of the Taiwan Salt Company.

In 2009, John Wu of the KMT defeated his DPP opponent, Cheng Wen-tsan and became the Magistrate of Taoyuan County.

In 2014, following the upgrade of Taoyuan County to Taoyuan City, Cheng Wen-tsan of the DPP won the Taoyuan City mayoral election and became the city's first mayor.

In 2022 Taoyuan City mayoral election, Chang San-cheng of the KMT was elected as the new mayor.

== Administrative divisions ==
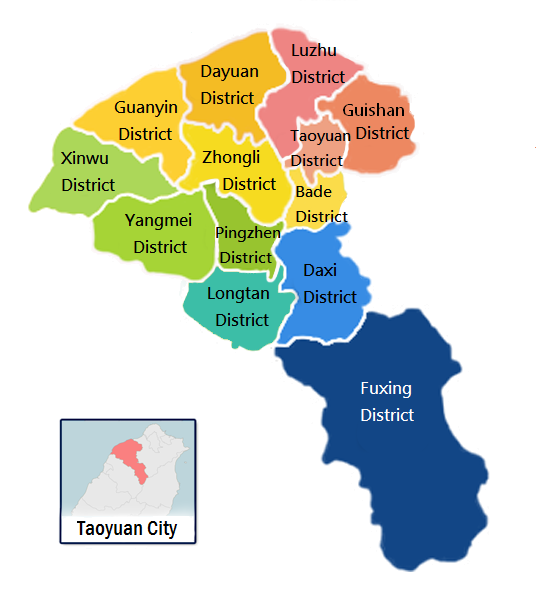
Taoyuan City Administrative Divisions

Taoyuan City is divided into 12 municipal districts and 1 mountain indigenous district. The city government is located within Taoyuan District.

Type	Name	Chinese	Taiwanese	Hakka	Formosan	Area (km^{2})	Population (March 2023)
District	Bade	八德區	Pat-tek	Pat-tet		33.71	210,857
District	Daxi	大溪區	Tāi-khe	Thai-hâi		105.14	94,549
District	Dayuan	大園區	Tōa-hn̂g	Thai-yèn		87.39	86,026
District	Guanyin	觀音區	Koan-im	Kôn-yîm		87.98	73,443
District	Guishan	龜山區	Ku-soaⁿ	Kuî-sân		72.01	174,258
District	Longtan	龍潭區	Liông-thâm	Liùng-thâm		75.23	125,446
District	Luzhu	蘆竹區	Lô·-tek	Lù-tsuk		75.50	167,729
District	Pingzhen	平鎮區	Pêng-tìn	Phìn-tsṳ́n		47.75	228,513
District	Taoyuan	桃園區	Thô-hn̂g	Thò-yèn		34.80	465,606
District	Xinwu	新屋區	Sin-ok	Sîn-vuk		85.02	49,282
District	Yangmei	楊梅區	Iûⁿ-mûi	Yông-muì		89.12	178,385
District	Zhongli	中壢區	Tiong-le̍k	Chûng-la̍k		76.52	426,326
Mountain indigenous district	Fuxing	復興區	Ho̍k-heng	Fu̍k-hîn	Pyasan^{Atayal}	350.78	13,089

Colors indicate the common language status of Hakka and Formosan languages within each division.

Prior to becoming a municipality on 25 December 2014, Taoyuan County used to have 6 county-administered cities (Bade, Luzhu, Pingzhen, Taoyuan, Yangmei, Zhongli), 1 urban township (Daxi), 5 rural townships (Dayuan, Guanyin, Guishan, Longtan, Xinwu), and 1 Mountain indigenous township (Fuxing).

== Education ==
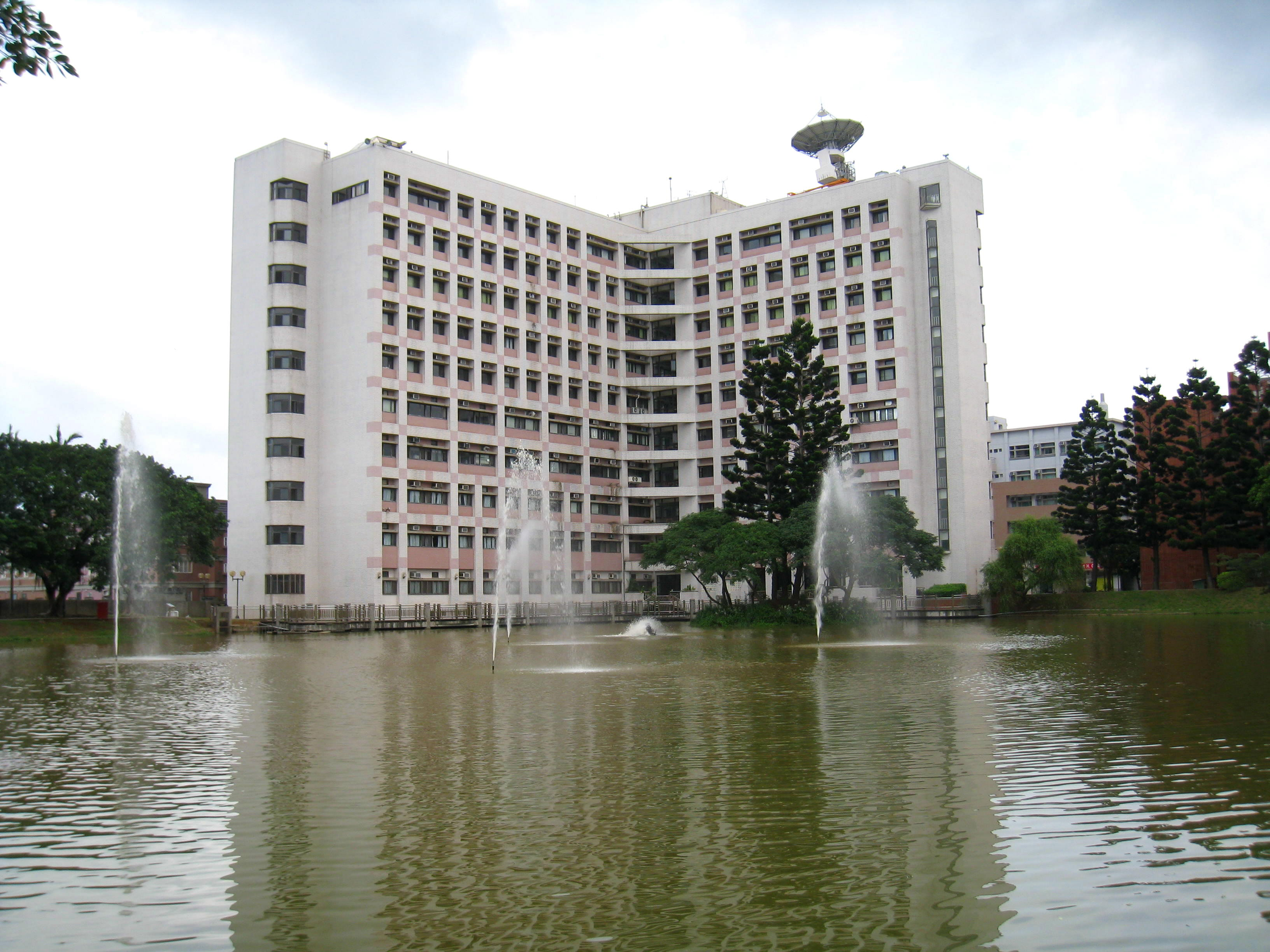
National Central University

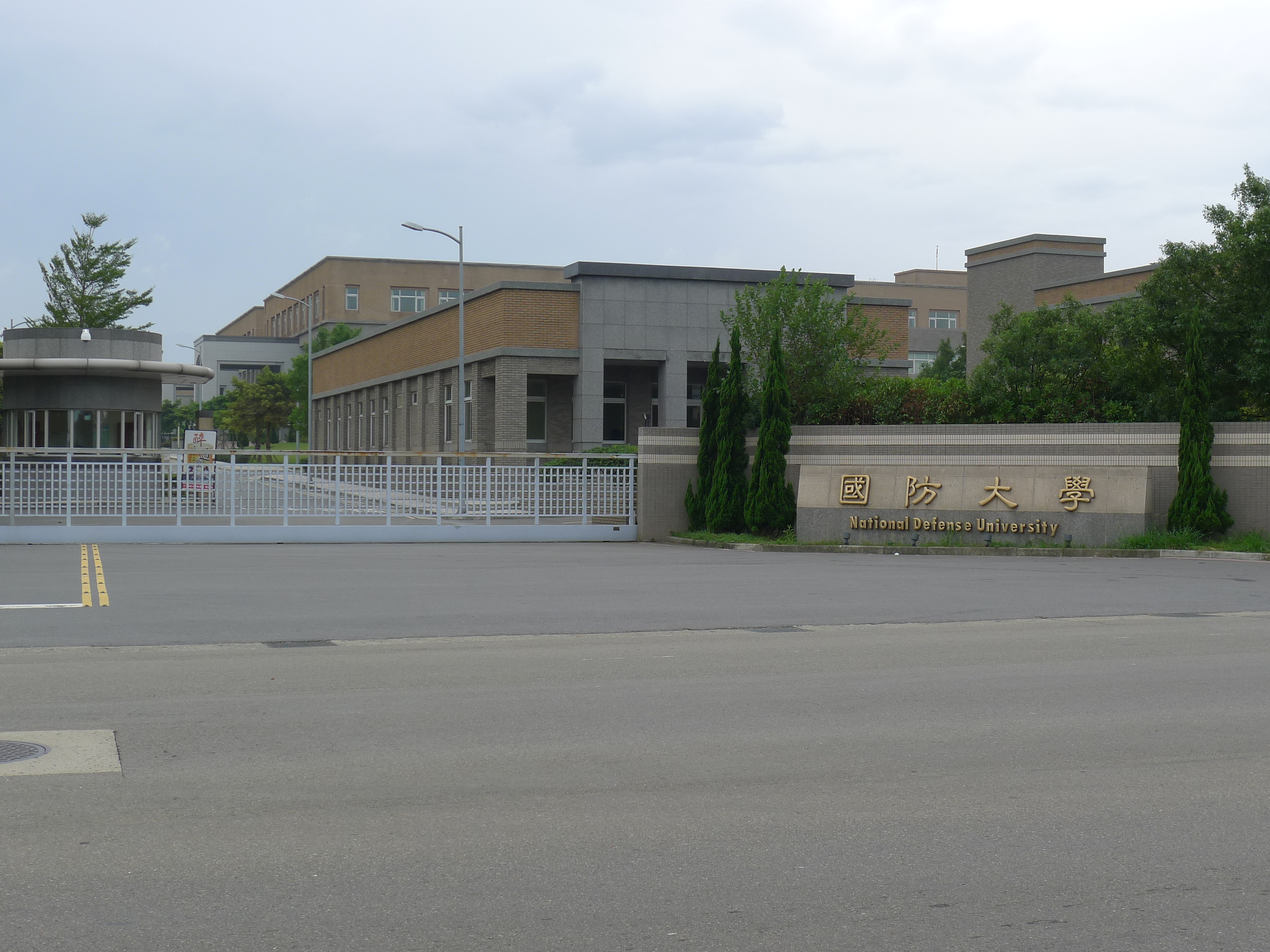
National Defense University

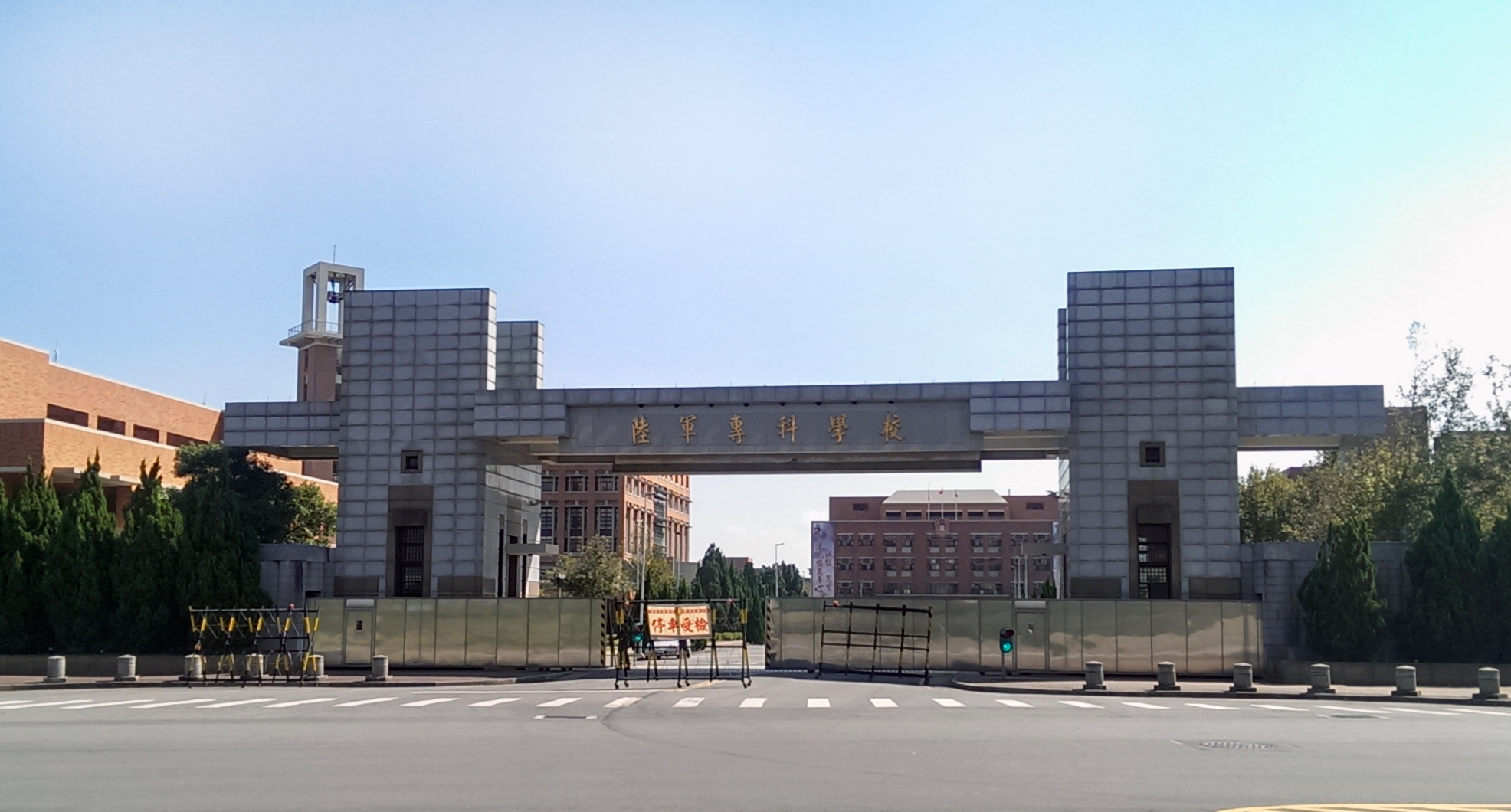
Army Academy R.O.C.

=== Public universities ===
- Central Police University
- National Central University
- National Defense University
- National Taiwan Sport University

=== Private universities ===
- Chang Gung University
- Ming Chuan University
- Chung Yuan Christian University
- Kainan University
- Yuan Ze University

=== Technical and vocational universities ===
- Chien Hsin University of Science and Technology
- Lunghwa University of Science and Technology
- Vanung University

=== Military Academies ===
- Army Academy R.O.C.
- Republic of China Army Communication, Electronics and Information School
- Republic of China Army Chemical School
- Republic of China Army Logistics School
- Republic of China Military Police School

=== Public high schools ===
- The Affiliated Jhongli Senior High School of National Central University
- Taoyuan Municipal Nei Li Senior High School
- Taoyuan Municipal Taoyuan Senior High School
- Taoyuan Municipal Yang Mei Senior High School
- Taoyuan Municipal Yang Ming Senior High School
- Taoyuan Municipal Wu-Ling Senior High School
- Taoyuan Municipal Dasi Senior High School
- Taoyuan Municipal Dayuan International Senior High School
- Taoyuan Municipal Nankan Senior High School
- Taoyuan Municipal Pingjen Senior High School
- Taoyuan Municipal Shoushan Senior High School
- Taoyuan Municipal Yung-Feng High School
- Taoyuan Municipal Yungfong Senior High School
- Taoyuan Municipal Xinwu High School
- Taoyuan Municipal Longtan Senior High School
- Taoyuan Municipal LuoFu Senior High School
- Taoyuan Municipal Guanyin High School

=== International schools ===
- Taoyuan American School

=== Taoyuan Main Public Library ===
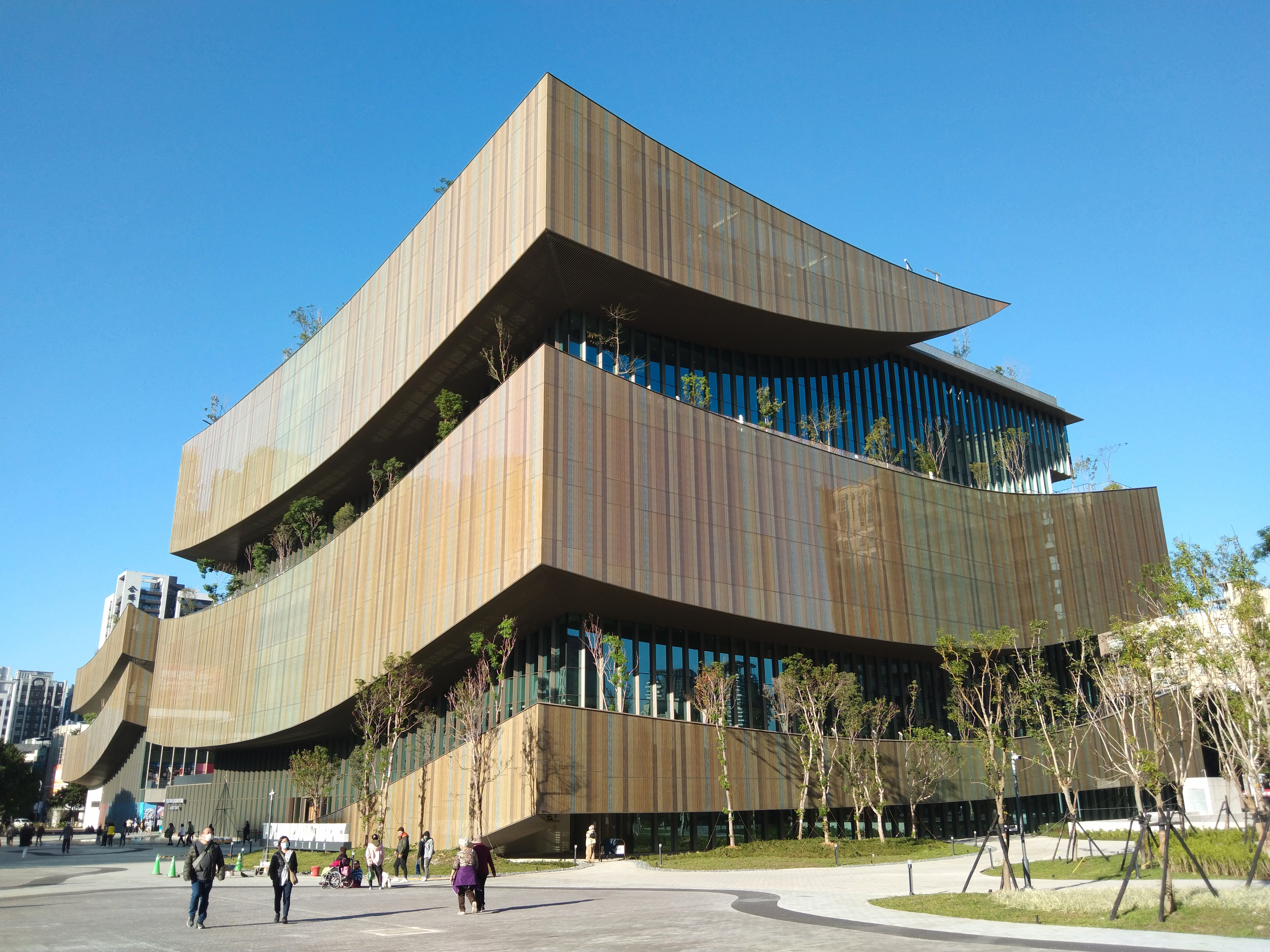
Taoyuan Main Public Library

Taoyuan Main Public Library is the central library of Taoyuan, located in Taoyuan Zhongzheng Arts and Cultural Business District. The new library building opened in December 2022. It was designed by T.C.K. Architect Engineer Planner and Azusa Sekkei. It is the largest local public library in Taiwan.

== Sports ==
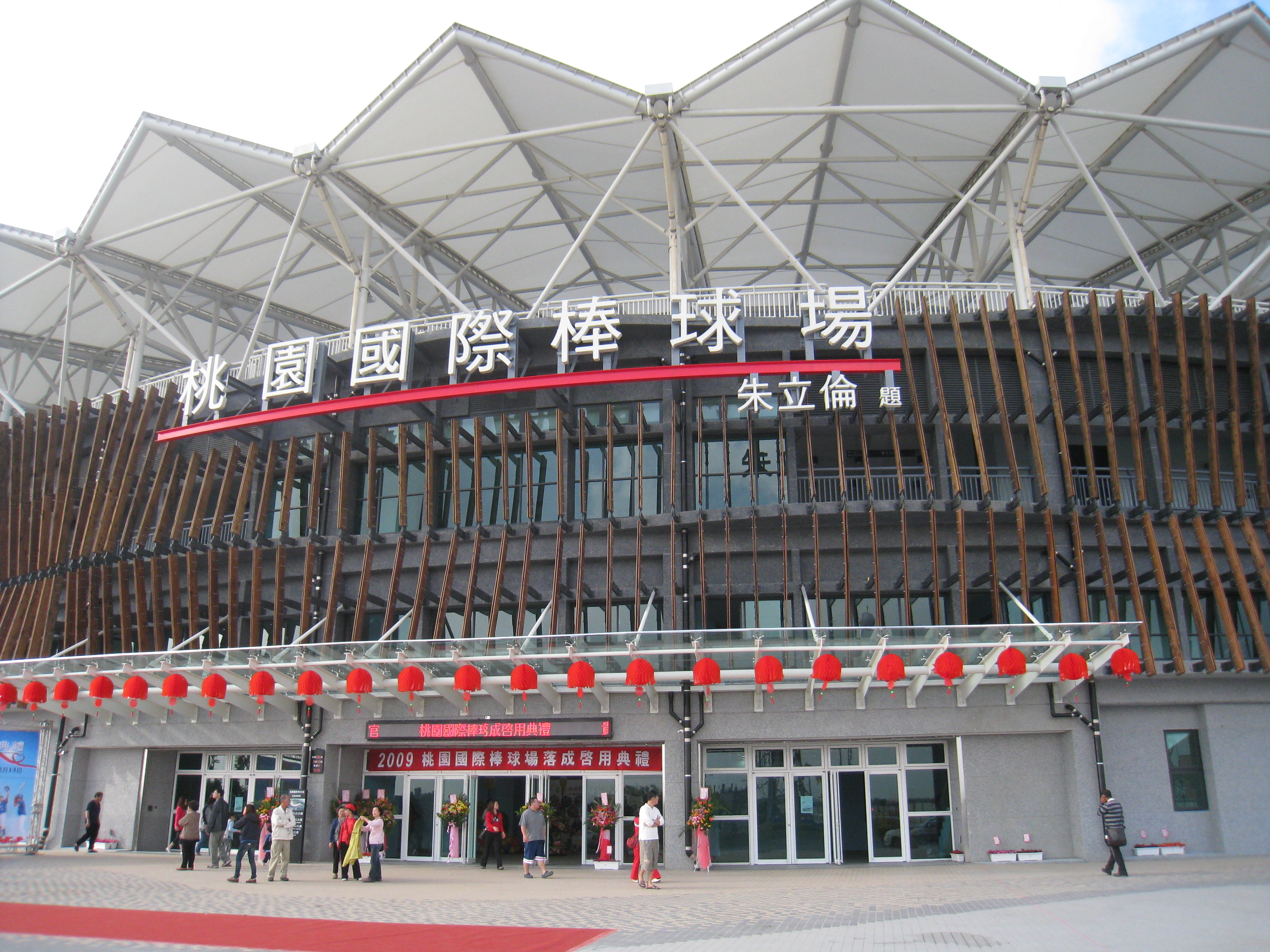
Taoyuan International Baseball Field.

The Taoyuan International Baseball Stadium is home to the Rakuten Monkeys of the Chinese Professional Baseball League (CPBL). Taoyuan also has two professional basketball teams, the Taoyuan Leopards of the T1 League and the Taoyuan Pauian Pilots of the P. League+ (shared with Changhua County).

The Taoyuan County Stadium, built in 1993, is a multi-use stadium used mostly for football matches that also has an athletics track. The stadium has a capacity of 30,000 spectators. It is within walking distance southwest from Taoyuan Senior High School Station of Taiwan Railway.

The Taoyuan Arena, also built in 1993, is an indoor sporting arena located in Taoyuan District. The concept of its roof structure was based on the bicycle structure, the outer ring (to bear pressure) and inner tire (to bear tensile strength) of the bicycle wheels are connected by cable wires. It occupies an area of 1.5 hectares (3.7 acres) with a capacity of 15,000 spectators. It is used to host indoor sporting events, such as basketball and volleyball.

The then-Taoyuan County is also the birthplace of Taiwanese professional golfer Yani Tseng and taekwondo athlete Chu Mu-Yen.

Recent major sporting events held by Taoyuan include:

- 2004 Asian Karate Championships
- 2011 BWF World Junior Championships
- 2015 Asia Pacific Deaf Games
- 2015 WBSC Premier12 (co-hosted with Taichung, Taipei, and Yunlin (Douliu))
- 2018 World Taekwondo Grand Prix (Series 3)
- 2019 WBSC Premier12 (co-hosted with Taichung)
- 2019 Asian Airgun Championships

== Notable persons ==
- Yani Tseng (Guishan District)
- Lu Chao-Hsuan (Guishan District)
- Jerry Yan
- Cheng Wen-tsan (Bade District)
- Eric Chu (Bade District)
- Lin Chung-lung
- Yeh Shuhua
- Martino Yu

== Transportation ==
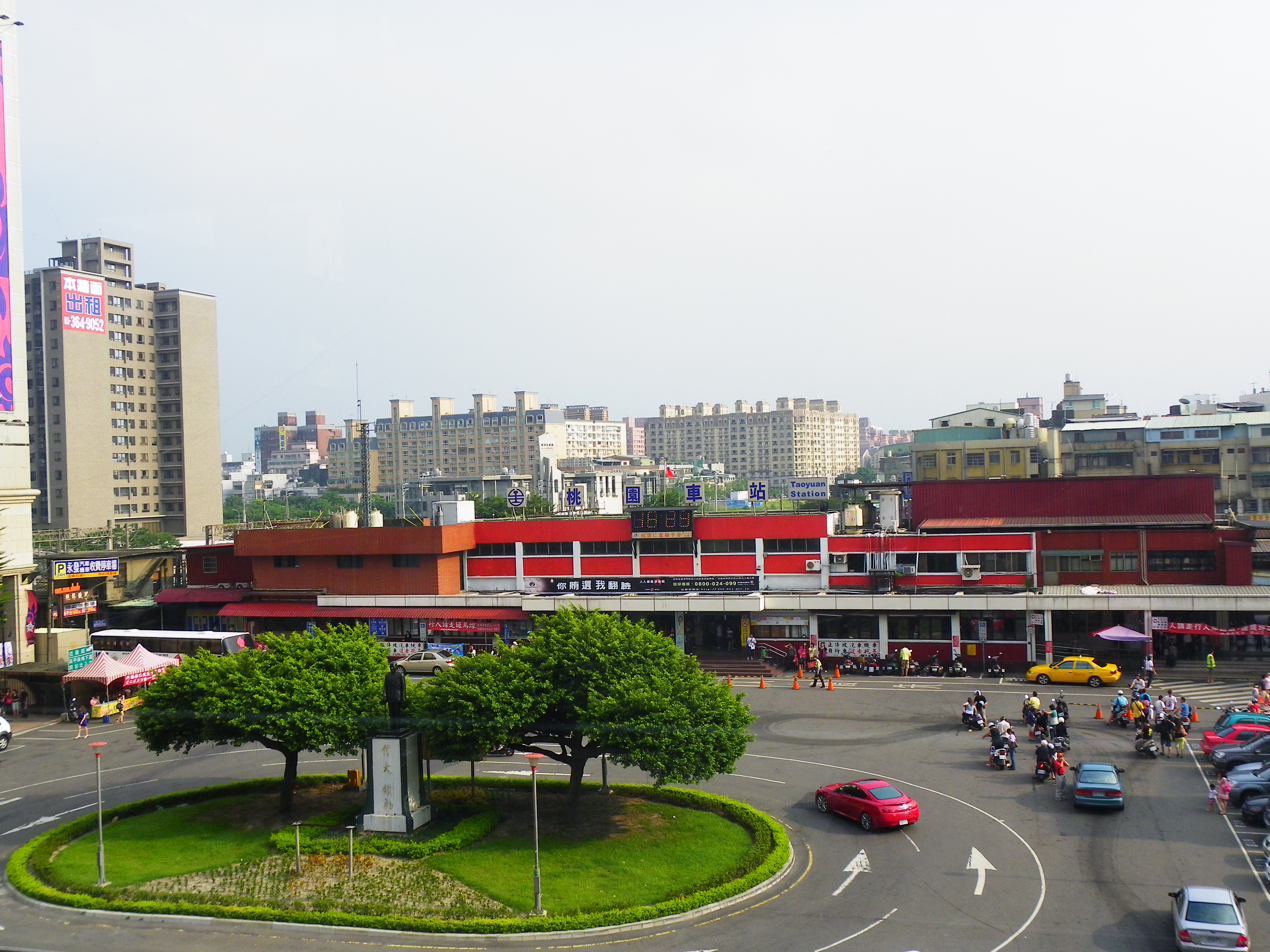
TRA Taoyuan Station

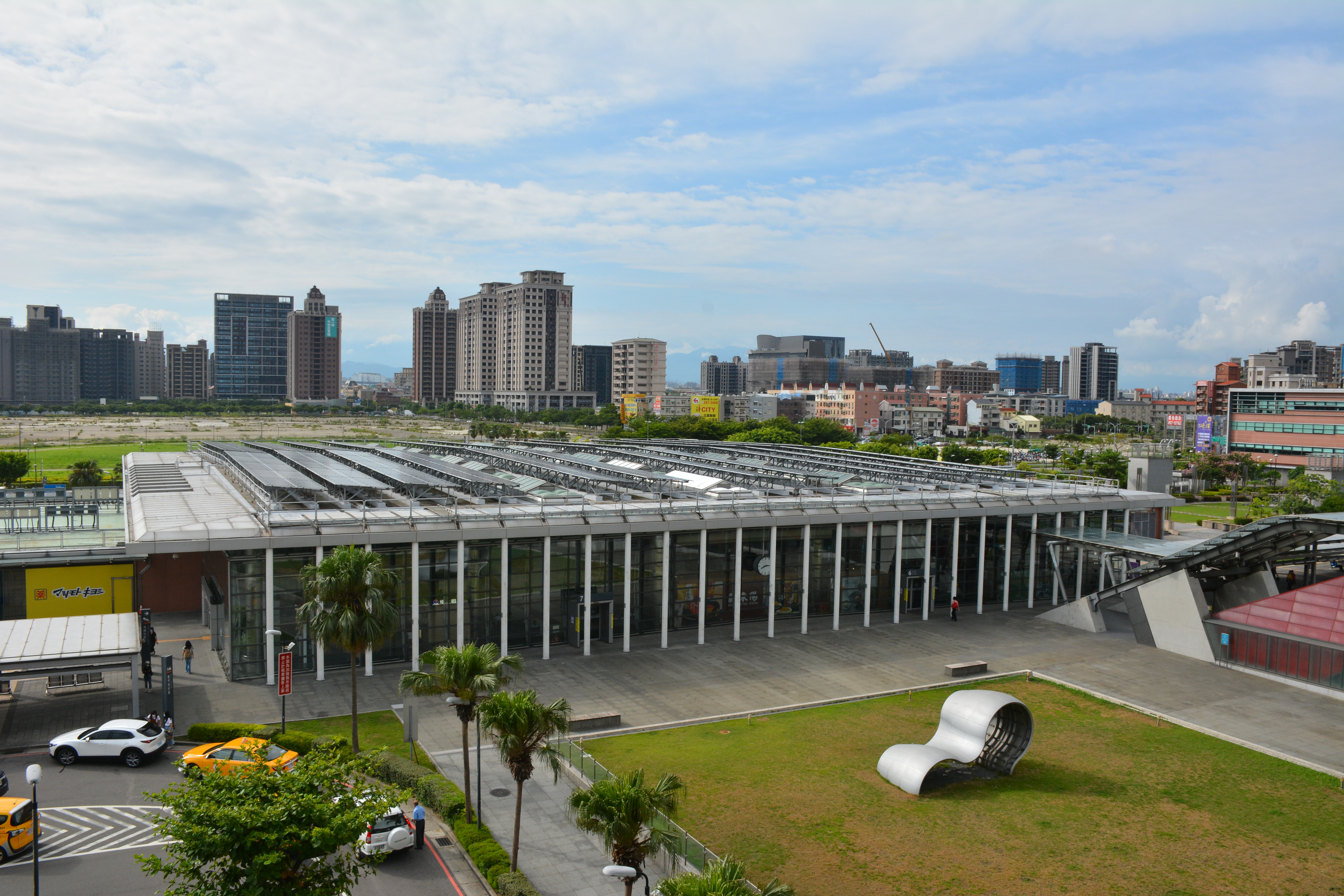
THSR Taoyuan Station

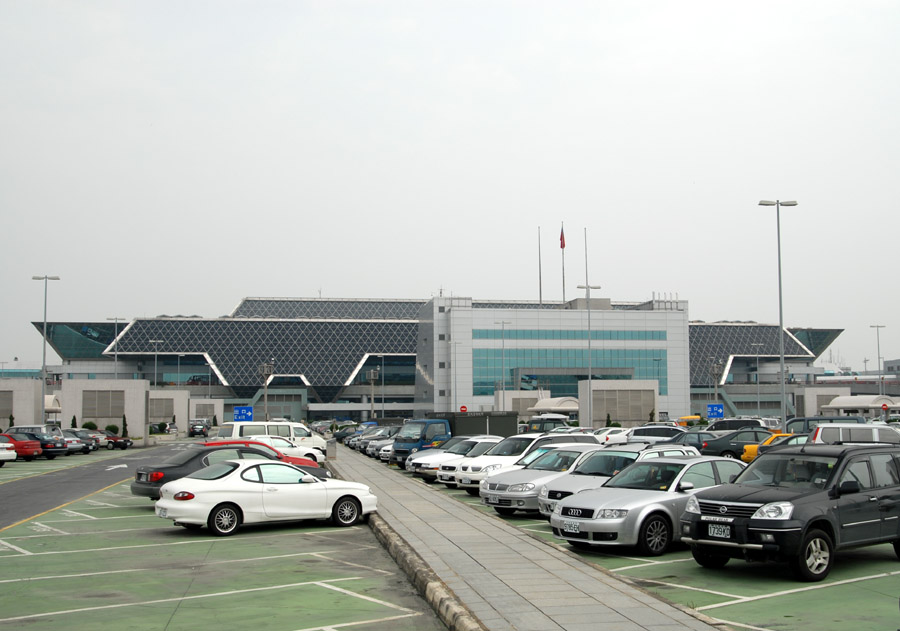
Taoyuan International Airport

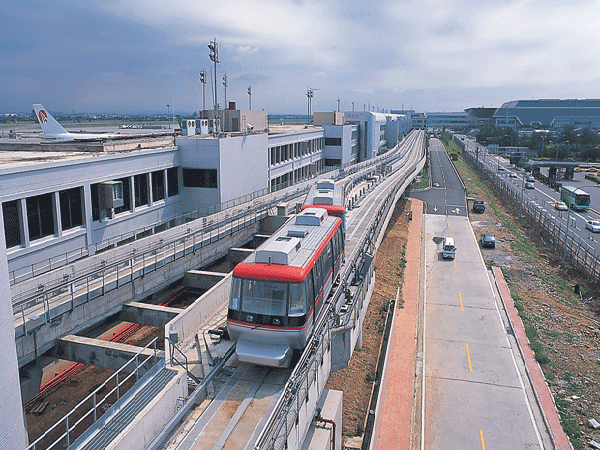
The Skytrain shuttles passengers between Terminals 1 and 2, Taoyuan International Airport.

=== Rail ===
Taiwan Railway Western Line（Taoyuan - Zhonglu - Taoyuan Hospital - Neili - Chungyuan - Zhongli - Pingzhen - Puxin - Yangmei - Fugang - Xinfu）

- Taiwan High Speed Rail

Taoyuan Station is located at the Qingpu (青埔) area, in Zhongli District.

==== Mass Rapid Transit ====
The rapid transit system of the city is Taoyuan Metro and is operational since April 2017.

- Lines and stations of the Taoyuan MRT System:

Line		Termini		Length (km)	Total Length (km)	Status
Taoyuan Airport MRT		Taipei	Laojie River	51.76	53.09	In operation
Taoyuan Airport MRT		Laojie River	Zhongli	1.33	53.09	Under construction
Taoyuan Airport MRT		Zhongli	Zhongli Sports Park	TBD		Planning
Green	Main Line	Bade	Kengkou	27.8	39.33	Under construction
Green	Main Line	Bade	Hengshan	27.8	39.33	Under construction
Green	Zhongli Extension	Bade	Zhongli Sports Park	7.2	39.33	Planning
Green	Daxi Extension	Bade	Puding	4.33	39.33	Planning
Orange	Taoyuan-Pingzhen Line	Taoyuan Arena	TBD	21	29	Planning
Orange	Pingzhen-Longtan Line	TBD	Longtan	8	29	Planning
Brown	Main Line	Taoyuan	Huilong	11.38	15.28	Planning
Brown	Urban Extension	Taoyuan	Zhonglu	3.9	15.28	Planning
New Taipei Metro: Sanying Line		Dingpu	Yingtao Fude	14.29	18.17	Under Construction
New Taipei Metro: Sanying Line		Yingtao Fude	Da'nan	3.88	18.17	Planning

=== Road ===
National Highway No. 1 and 3 are nearby and connect via local highways to the city itself. National Highway No. 2 connects to Taoyuan International Airport. Bridges in the city are Luofu Bridge.

=== Bus ===
- Taoyuan Bus Co.
- Zhongli Bus Co.

=== Air ===
Taiwan Taoyuan International Airport at Dayuan District is the largest airport in Taiwan. It serves as the main international hub for China Airlines and EVA Air. Taiwan Taoyuan handled 25,114,418 passengers in 2010. It is the fifteenth-busiest air freight hub in the world and thirteenth-busiest by international passenger traffic. Taipei Taoyuan International Airport currently has two terminals which are connected by two, short people movers. A third terminal and a rapid transit system linking the terminals together underground are currently under construction.

== International relations ==
=== Twin towns – Sister cities ===
- Miaoli City, Taiwan (2006)
- Incheon, South Korea (2009)
- Radom, Poland (2011)
- Narita, Chiba, Japan (2016)
- Ramat Gan, Israel (2016)
- Kota Kinabalu, Malaysia (2017)
- Grenoble, France (2018)
- Miyazaki, Miyazaki, Japan (2018)
- Aur Atoll, Marshall Islands (2018)
- Long Beach, California, United States (2022)

=== Sister county ===
- Alameda County, California, United States (1977)
- Hartford County, Connecticut, United States (1982)
- Dallas County, Texas, United States (2007)

== See also ==
- Taoyuan–Zhongli metropolitan area
- Taoyuan International Airport
