= Daxi District =

District in Taoyuan City, Taiwan

Daxi 大溪區 Daikei
- District
- Daxi District
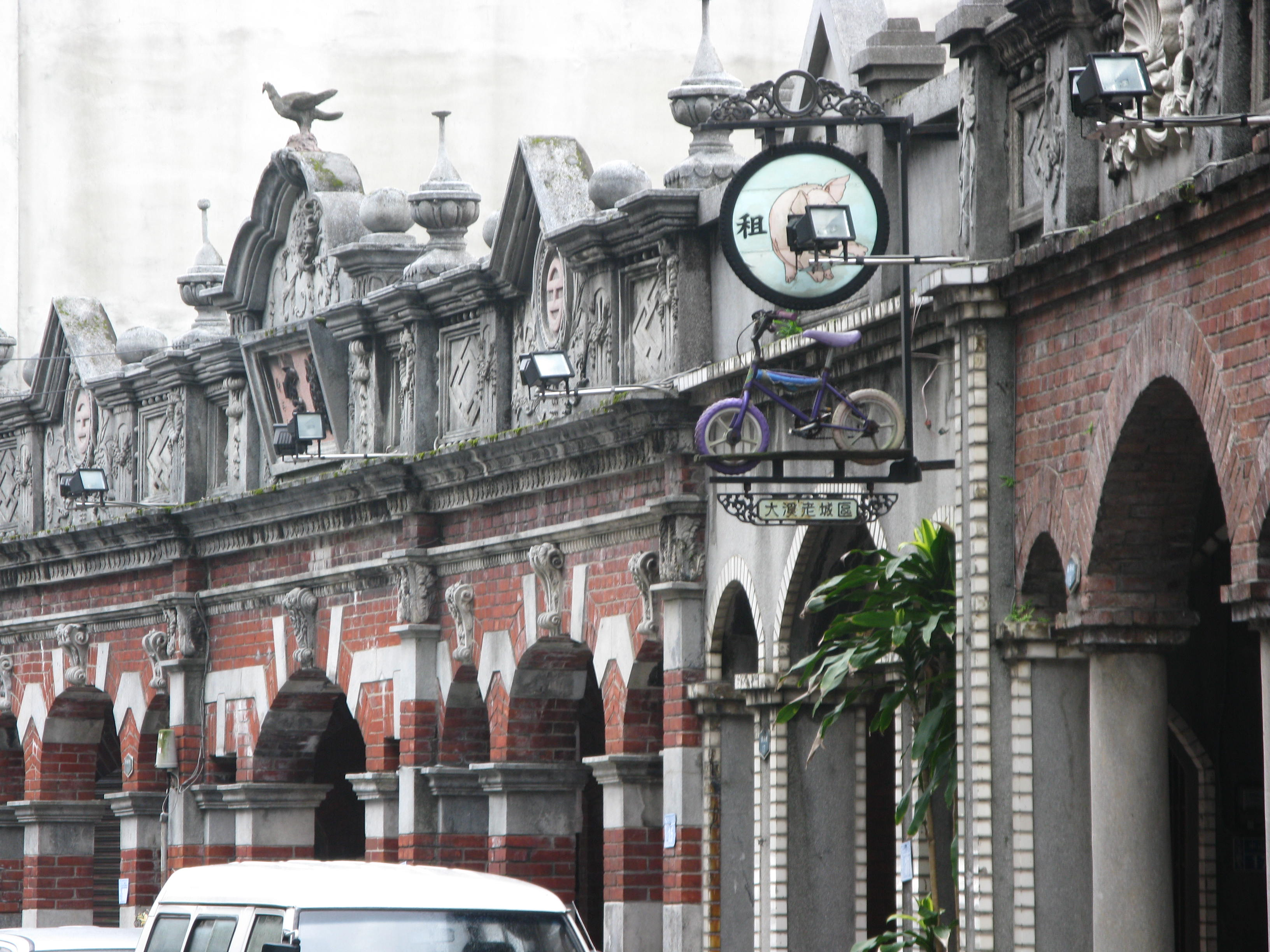

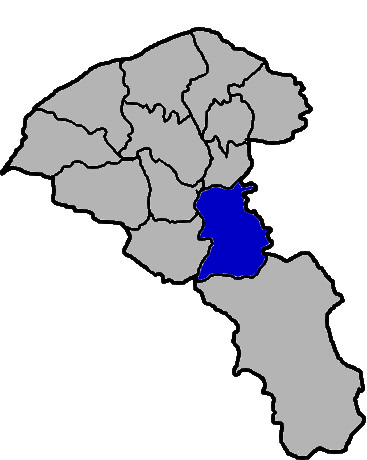
- Daxi District in Taoyuan City
- Coordinates: 24°52′50.2″N 121°17′13.5″E
- Country: Taiwan
- Municipality: Taoyuan City

Government
  - Mayor: Chen, Jia-cong

Area
  - Total: 40.6 sq mi (105.1 km^{2})

Population (February 2023)
  - Total: 94,475
- Website: www.daxi.tycg.gov.tw (in Chinese)

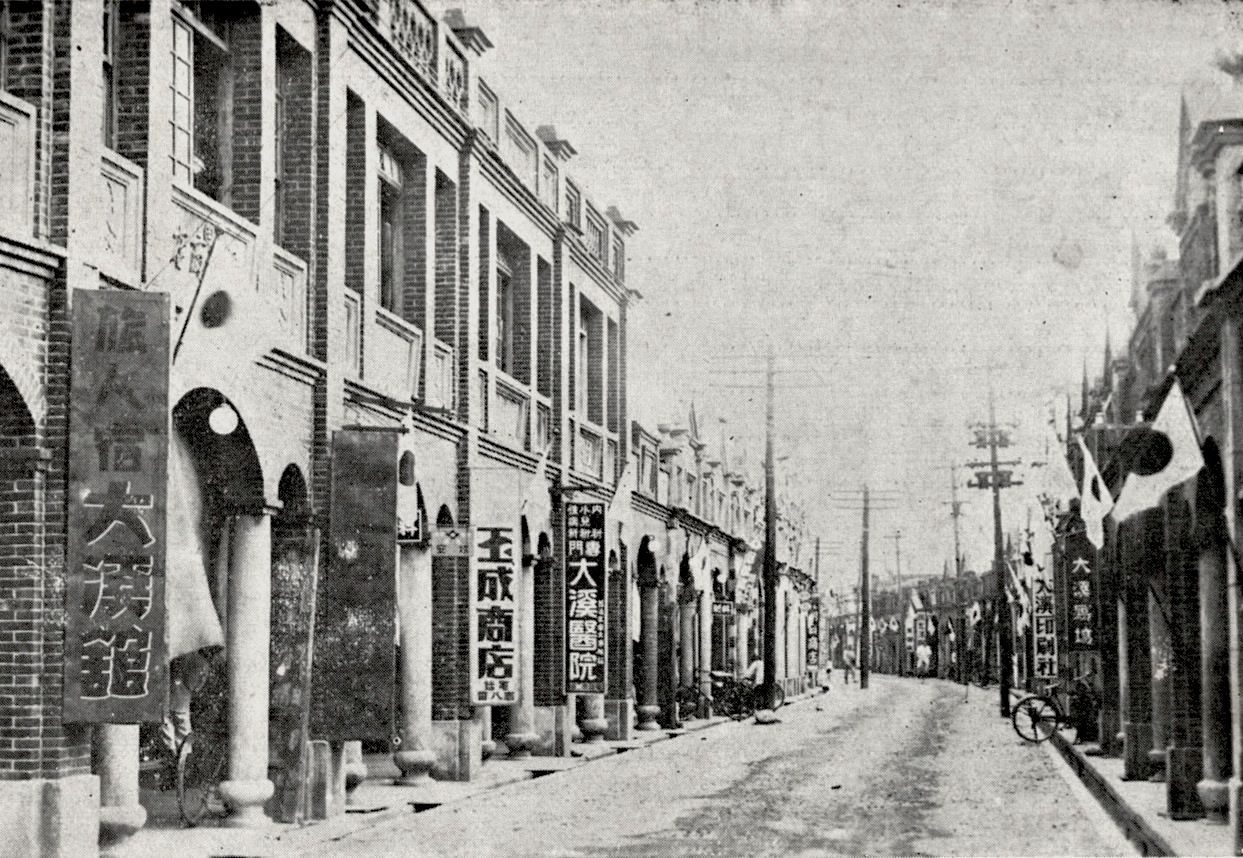
Daxi in 1930

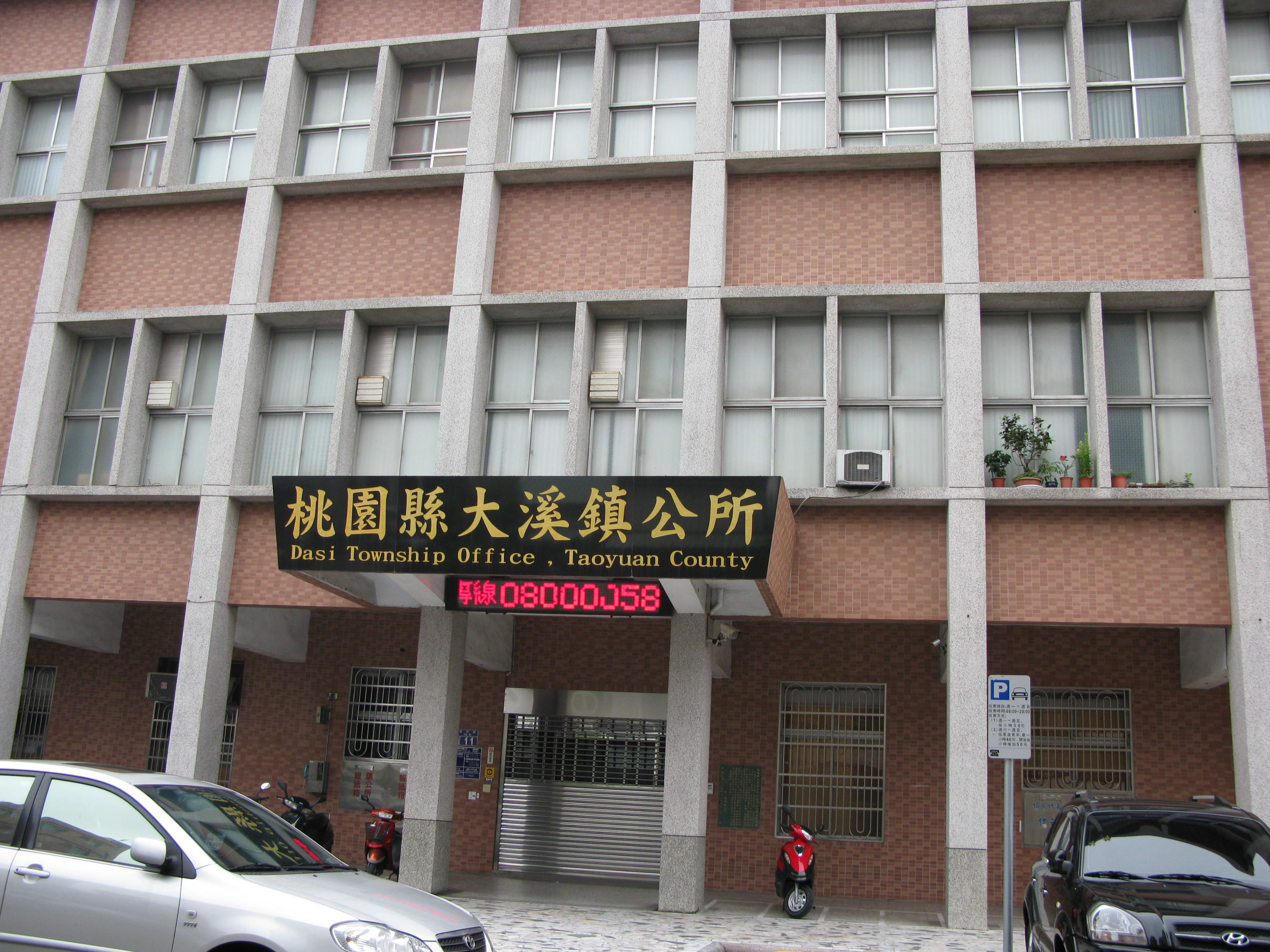
Daxi District office (then Daxi Township office)

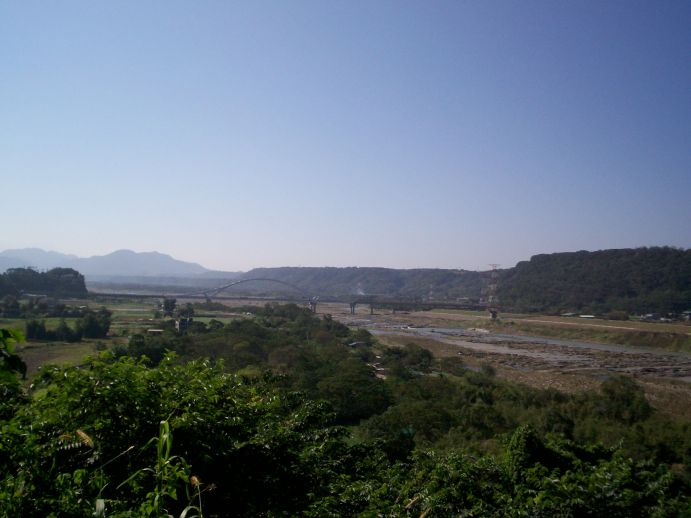
Daxi Valley

Daxi District (Chinese: 大溪區; Hanyu Pinyin: Dàxī Qū; Tongyong Pinyin: Dàsi Cyu; Wade–Giles: Ta⁴-hsi¹ Chʻü¹), formerly known as Daxi Township (Chinese: 大溪鎮; Hanyu Pinyin: Dàxī Zhèn; Tongyong Pinyin: Dàsi Jhèn; Wade–Giles: Ta⁴-hsi¹ Chên⁴), is a district in eastern Taoyuan City, Taiwan. In March 2012, it was named one of the Top 10 Small Tourist Destinations by the Tourism Bureau of Taiwan.

== History ==
The Daxi area was occupied for several thousand years by the Atayal people. The Atayal called the local river (modern-day Dahan Creek) Takoham in their native Austronesian language. This gave rise to similar names such as Toa-kho-ham (Chinese: 大嵙陷; Pe̍h-ōe-jī: Tōa-kho͘-hām; also 大嵙崁; Tōa-kho͘-khàm) in Hokkien and Taikokan in Japanese via transliteration.

Eighteenth-century Han settlement in the Taipei Basin led many Atayal families to relocate upriver, though some Atayal stayed and mingled with the newcomers. The settlement later became an important trading post in the 19th century.

In 1803, open fighting broke out between two rival factions of Han settlers in Taipei, and many refugees fled south for safety. Among the refugees was the Lin Ben Yuan Family, one of the wealthiest clans in Taiwan at the time. The clan settled in Takoham, invested its fortunes in the settlement and brought prosperity to the whole region. Due to its strategic location and the investments made by the Lin clan, Takoham became the center of trading and transportation between Taipei and the south. Goods would arrive here to be transported to Taipei via Dahan river, and many traders opened their shops in the area; some of the shops still exist today in the old town section.

When the North-South Railway that bypasses the Takoham settlement was completed in 1909, the importance of river trade declined. Takoham lost its significance in North-South transportation, and is no longer a significant trading port. On the other hand, it became famous for the production of wooden furniture. In 1920, the Japanese government renamed this area 大溪 ("big creek"), pronounced Daikei in Japanese and Dàxī in Mandarin, which was administered under Shinchiku Prefecture.

Daxi dried tofu is a popular ingredient in Taiwanese cuisine. Daxi is also home to the mausoleums of two Kuomintang leaders: the late president Chiang Kai-shek in nearby Cihu and his son Chiang Ching-kuo in Touliao.

== Administrative divisions ==
Xinghe, Furen, Tianxin, Yixin, Yide, Yuemei, Yongfu, Kangan, Yihe, Meihua, Fuan, Fuxing, Xinfeng, Zhongxin, Ruixing, Renshan, Qiaoai, Renyi, Renhe, Renai, Renwu, Renwen, Nanxing, Yuanlin, Guangming, Ruiyuan and Sanyuan Village.

== Economy ==
The headquarters of Kimlan Foods is located in Daxi.

== Tourist attractions ==
- A-mu Ping
- Cihu Mausoleum
- Cihur
- Daxi Bridge
- Daxi Health Herb Garden
- Daxi Old Street
- Daxi Wood Art Ecomuseum
- Daxi Wude Hall
- Furen Temple
- Hoping Old Street
- Jien's Archaic Mansion
- Kuanyin Temple at Lotus Seat Mountain
- Lee Teng-fan's Ancient Residence
- Mei-hwa Spinning Top Museum
- Presbyterian Church of Daxi
- Puzi Temple
- Saint Franciscan Catholic Church
- Taoliao Lake
- Touliao Mausoleum
- Ximen Reservoir
- Zaiming Temple
- Zhongshan Road
- Zhongzheng Park

== Local celebration Festival ==
- DAXI DAXI
- Daxi Dried Tofu Festival

== Transportation ==
=== Bus ===
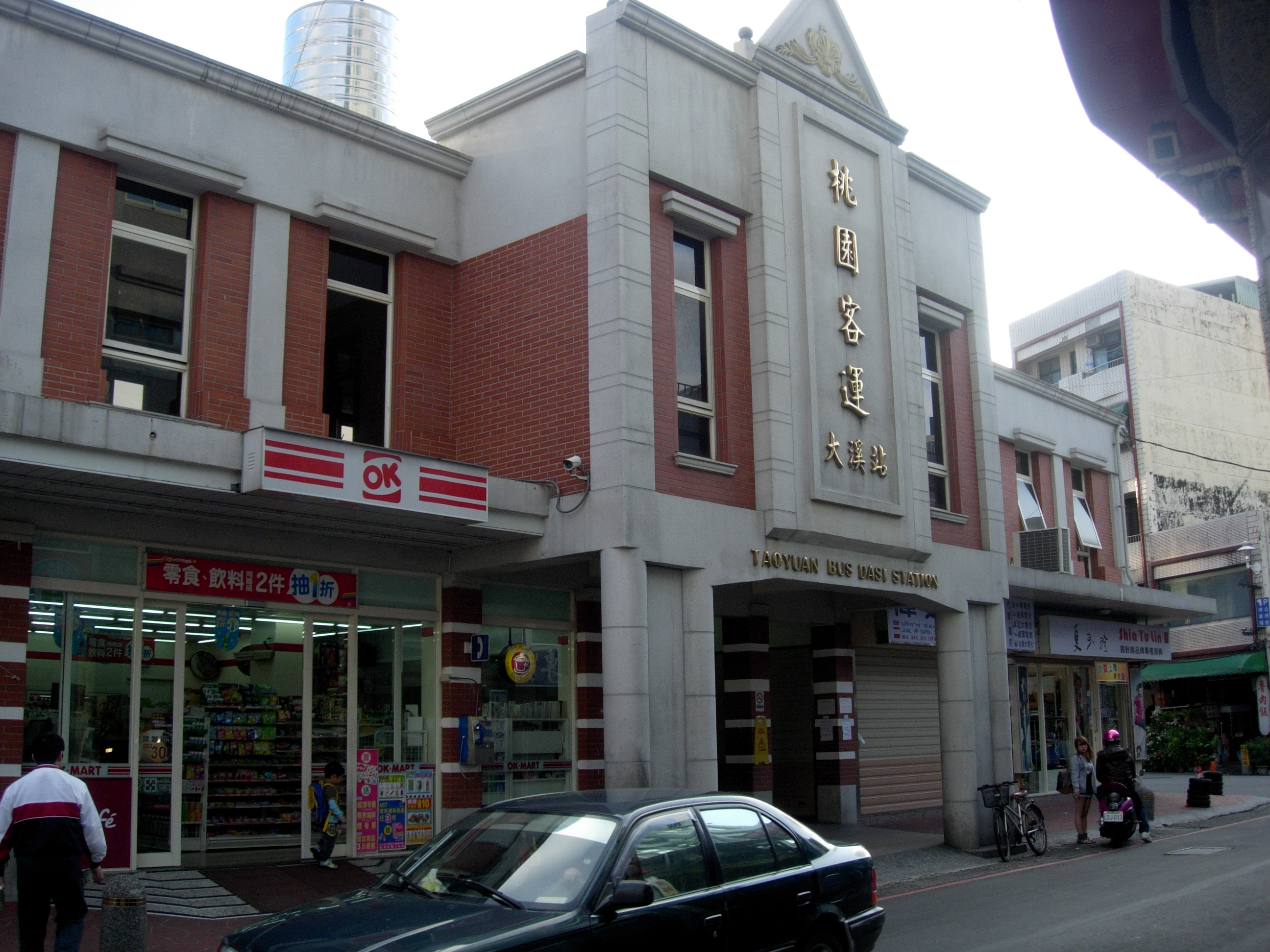
Daxi Bus Station

- Daxi Bus Station of Taoyuan Bus have most of routes to Daxi, and 5096 route from Taoyuan Station and 5098 route from Zhongli Station send every 10 to 20 minutes.
- Taiwan Tourist Shuttle Routes have Daxi Express to Daxi and Xiaowulai Route also passes through Daxi.
- Ropo Bus have 710 Express from Yongning Station of Taipei Metro to Daxi.

=== Road ===
Daxi is served by National Highway No. 3 and Provincial Highway No. 66.

== Notable natives ==
- Fong Fei-fei, former singer and actress
- Lu Tie-Zhou, painter

== Climate ==
Climate data for Daxi District (2008–2023 normals, extremes 2007–present)
Month	Jan	Feb	Mar	Apr	May	Jun	Jul	Aug	Sep	Oct	Nov	Dec	Year
Record high °C (°F)	28.1 (82.6)	29.2 (84.6)	30.5 (86.9)	31.8 (89.2)	34.5 (94.1)	34.3 (93.7)	37.1 (98.8)	36.1 (97.0)	36.4 (97.5)	35.3 (95.5)	31.8 (89.2)	28.1 (82.6)	37.1 (98.8)
Mean daily maximum °C (°F)	18.0 (64.4)	18.9 (66.0)	21.3 (70.3)	24.6 (76.3)	27.9 (82.2)	30.6 (87.1)	32.6 (90.7)	32.3 (90.1)	30.8 (87.4)	26.5 (79.7)	23.7 (74.7)	19.2 (66.6)	25.5 (78.0)
Daily mean °C (°F)	14.7 (58.5)	15.2 (59.4)	17.3 (63.1)	20.5 (68.9)	24.0 (75.2)	26.6 (79.9)	28.0 (82.4)	27.6 (81.7)	26.4 (79.5)	23.1 (73.6)	20.3 (68.5)	16.0 (60.8)	21.6 (71.0)
Mean daily minimum °C (°F)	12.3 (54.1)	12.6 (54.7)	14.3 (57.7)	17.5 (63.5)	21.0 (69.8)	23.7 (74.7)	24.8 (76.6)	24.6 (76.3)	23.5 (74.3)	20.9 (69.6)	18.0 (64.4)	13.6 (56.5)	18.9 (66.0)
Record low °C (°F)	1.4 (34.5)	4.5 (40.1)	6.7 (44.1)	9.7 (49.5)	12.1 (53.8)	18.0 (64.4)	21.6 (70.9)	21.9 (71.4)	18.3 (64.9)	14.7 (58.5)	8.8 (47.8)	5.1 (41.2)	1.4 (34.5)
Average precipitation mm (inches)	94.9 (3.74)	114.9 (4.52)	155.2 (6.11)	139.1 (5.48)	242.6 (9.55)	294.4 (11.59)	180.8 (7.12)	289.3 (11.39)	179.8 (7.08)	114.5 (4.51)	93.3 (3.67)	98.7 (3.89)	1,997.5 (78.65)
Average precipitation days	11.8	11.5	13.4	12.8	13.8	14.2	10.1	12.8	9.8	9.6	10.1	12.8	142.7
Average relative humidity (%)	79.2	81.6	79.0	78.1	78.8	77.9	72.6	75.7	74.7	76.9	79.3	80.1	77.8
Source 1: Central Weather Administration
Source 2: Atmospheric Science Research and Application Databank (precipitation days and humidity 2007–2024)

== See also ==
- Taoyuan City

== Bibliography ==
- Campbell, William (1896). "The island of Formosa: Its past and future". Scottish Geographical Magazine. 12 (8): 385–399. doi:10.1080/00369229608732903.
- Davidson, James W. (1903). The Island of Formosa, Past and Present : history, people, resources, and commercial prospects : tea, camphor, sugar, gold, coal, sulphur, economical plants, and other productions. London and New York: Macmillan & co. OL 6931635M.
