= Lee Teng-fan's Ancient Residence =

Former residence in Daxi, Taoyuan City, Taiwan

- 李騰芳古宅
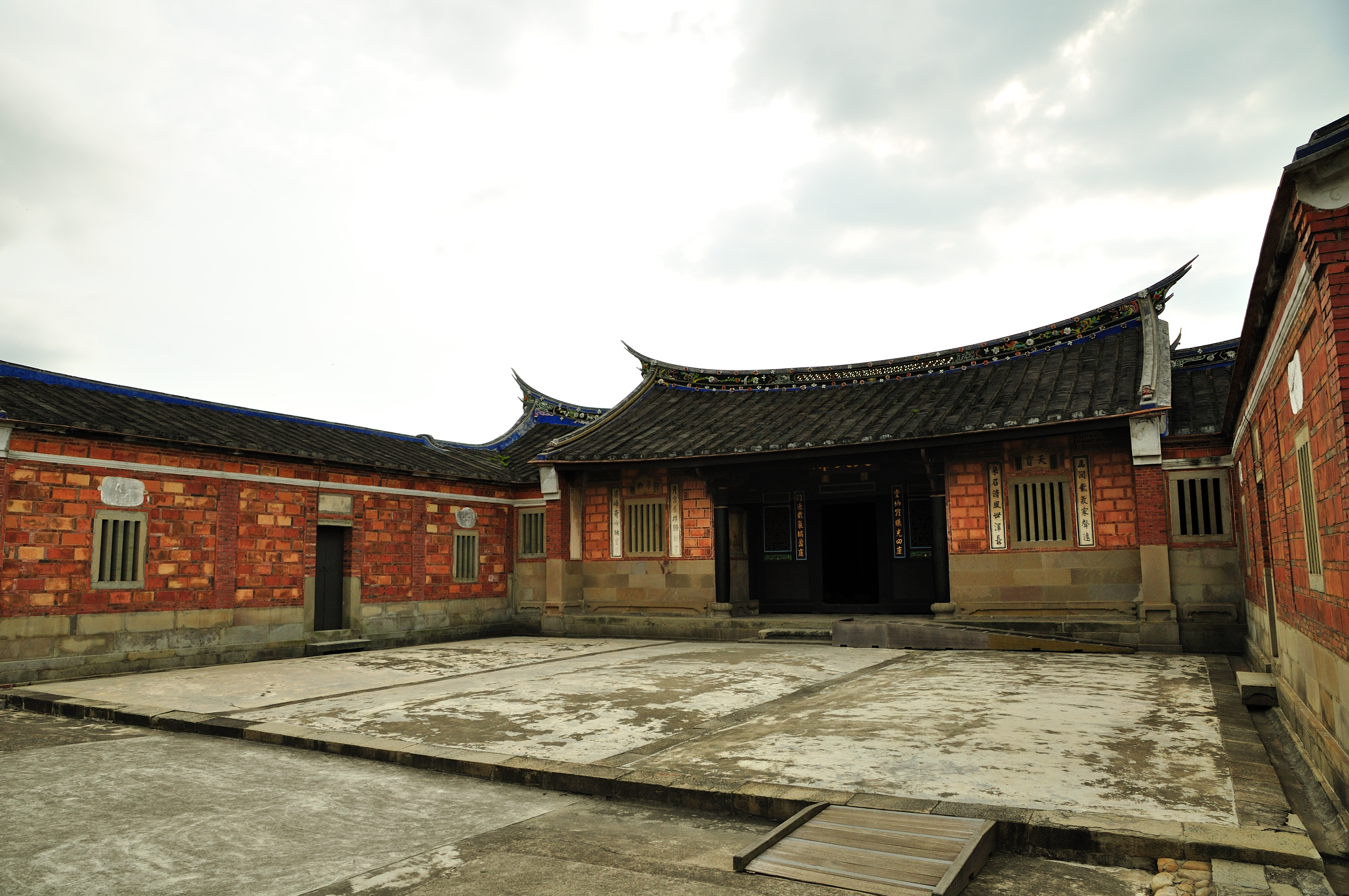
- Interactive map of the Lee Teng-fan's Ancient Residence area

General information
- Type: former residence
- Location: Daxi, Taoyuan City, Taiwan
- Coordinates: 24°53′26.6″N 121°17′42.6″E
- Opened: 1859

The Lee Teng-fan's Ancient Residence (traditional Chinese: 李騰芳古宅; simplified Chinese: 李腾芳古宅; pinyin: Lǐ Téngfāng Gǔzhái) is a former residence in Yuemei Village, Daxi District, Taoyuan City, Taiwan. The residence is part of Daxi Wood Art Ecomuseum.

== History ==
The residence building was built in 1859 after Teng-fan was recommended to Emperor Sien-feng by the local government. It was later on designed as a Grade 2 historic building by Taoyuan County Government. It was opened to the public in 2004.

== Architecture ==
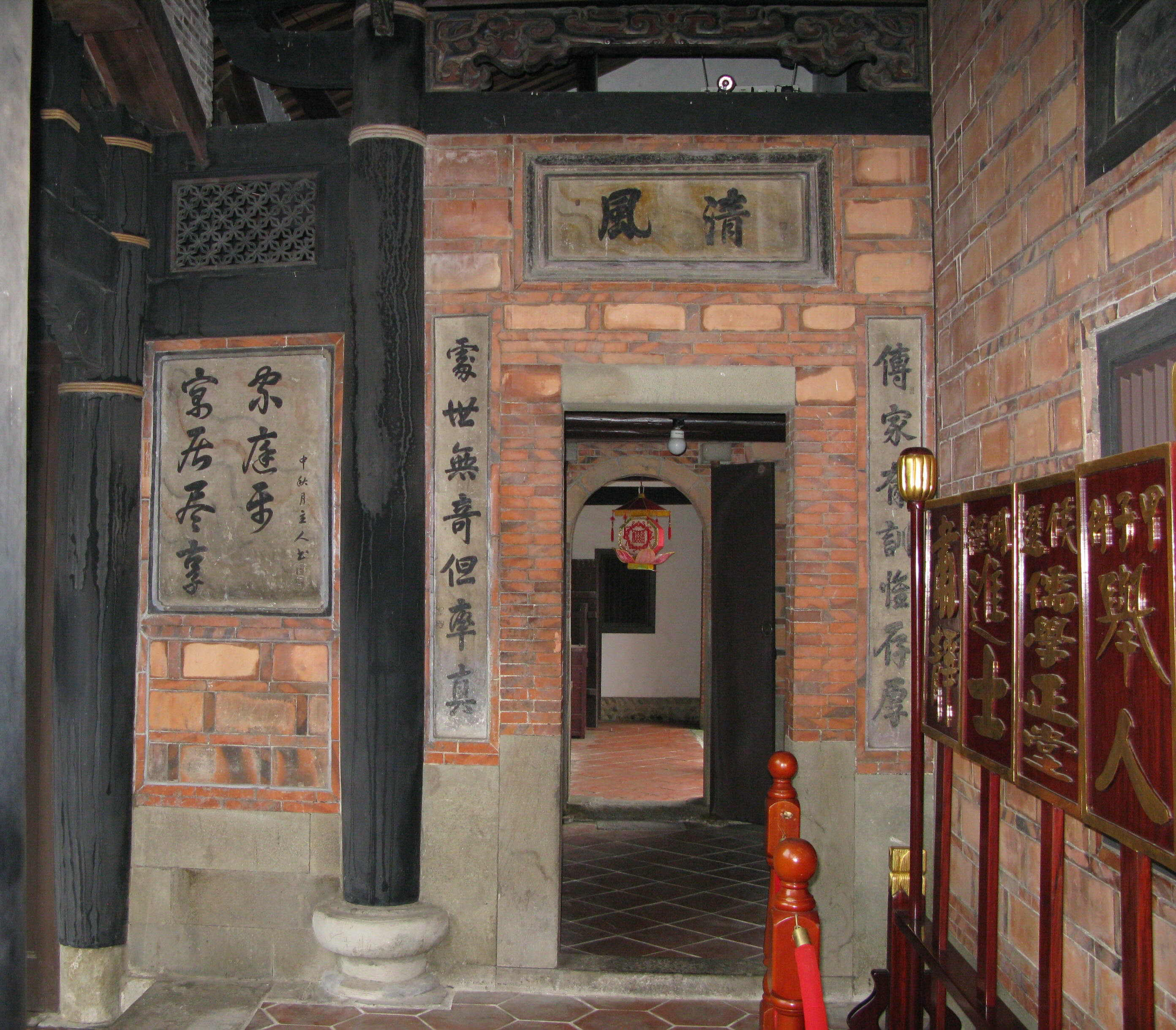
Building interior

The Hakka-style residence consists of two main buildings and four side buildings, guarded by a large semi-circular pool and a whitewashed wall of mud brick. The living and reception rooms are located at the center area. The side buildings on both sides guard the open courtyard with two stone bases. The roof of the center main hall is taller than the other portions. The reception area is the major entrance to the building. The main gate is placed slightly behind its ordinary position. The side buildings are the living quarters. Rooms were assigned to family members according to their seniority.

The residence buildings are decorated with woodcarvings. All of them are of the patterns of flowers, birds and animals. There are also many pieces of calligraphy and paintings inside the building.

== See also ==
- List of tourist attractions in Taiwan
