= Daxi Wude Hall =

Former martial arts hall in Daxi, Taoyuan City, Taiwan

- 大溪武德殿
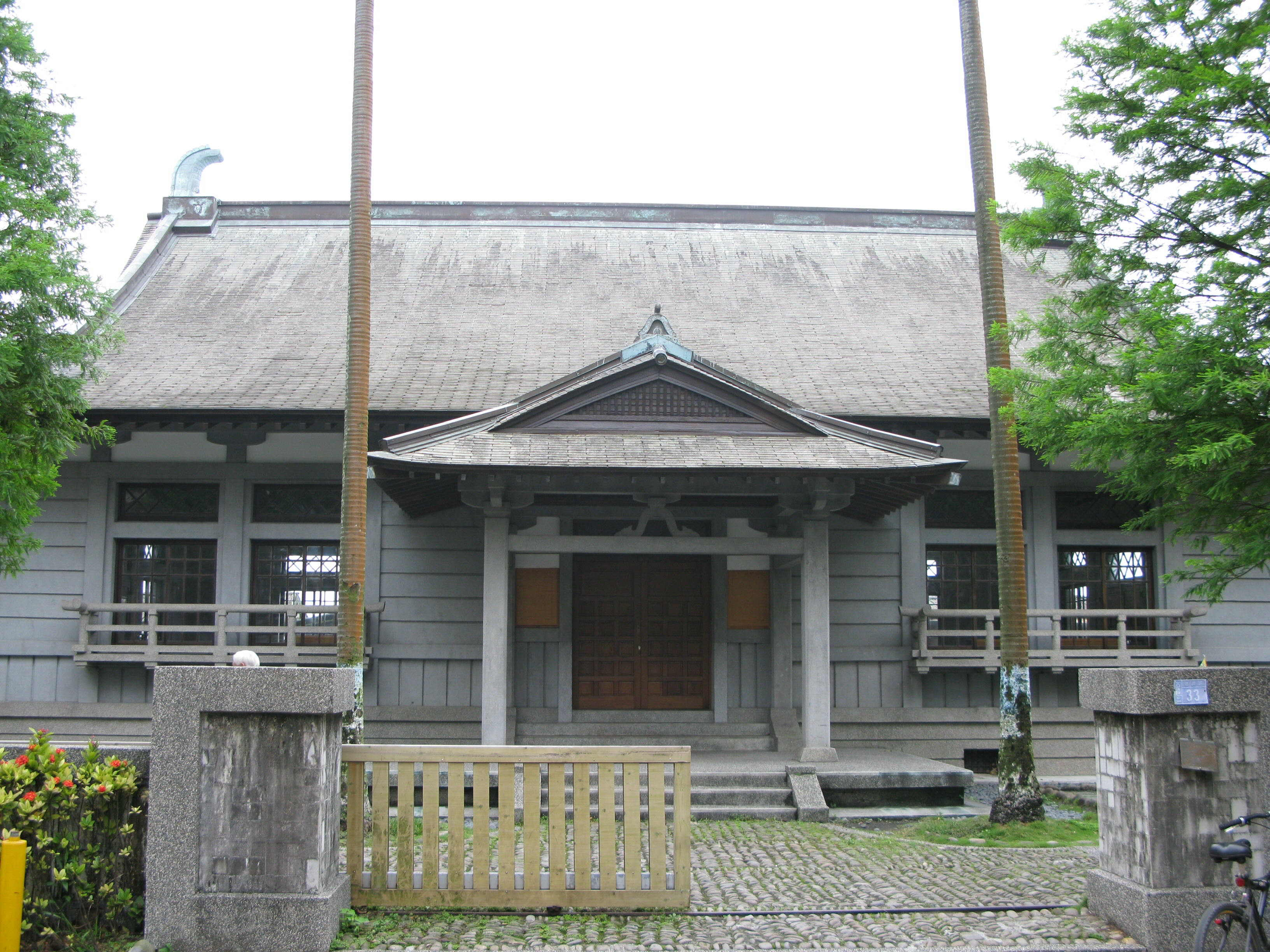
- Interactive map of the Daxi Wude Hall area

General information
- Type: former martial arts training center
- Location: Daxi, Taoyuan City, Taiwan
- Coordinates: 24°52′52.0″N 121°17′10.0″E
- Completed: February 1935

The Daxi Wude Hall (Chinese: 大溪武德殿; pinyin: Dàxī Wǔdé Diàn) is a former martial arts training center in Daxi District, Taoyuan City, Taiwan. The hall is part of Daxi Wood Art Ecomuseum.

== History ==
The building was completed in February 1935 during the Japanese rule of Taiwan which also included a convention center. However, due to the earthquake in April of the same year, the opening of the building was held on 20 May 1935. It was used as the martial arts training center for the police of the Japanese government. In 1950, the convention center was changed to the Presidential Residence. Military Police Corps was also established for the security and defense needs for the hall.

When the military police moved to Touliao Mausoleum in 1998, the army turned over the architecture and the land of Wude Hall to Daxi Township Administration Office. The administration office renovated the old dormitory in the north of the hall and turned it into an activity center for parents and children. Renovation of the main hall started on 10 November 2000 and completed in December 2001. During that time, three-level sleeping quarters in the south of the hall were also built.

== Architecture ==
The building was built using reinforced concrete and modeled after Japanese traditional temple of wood structure. The hall features a hip-and-gable roof and barge boards on the gable end, a roof of the unique style of Japanese Shinto architecture and a western roof truss. Half of the floor is paved with tatami for Judo practice area and the other half is paved with wooden boards for Kendo practice area.

The roof ridges contains animal with dragon head added with fish tail. The roof is covered with shingles of asbestos and modeled after the effects of red copper tiles. The external walls are decorated with a coating of pebbles and moldings to imitate the exterior of certain wall.

== Events ==
The hall occasionally conducts exhibitions etc.

== See also ==
- List of tourist attractions in Taiwan
