= Daxi Wood Art Ecomuseum =

Museum in Daxi, Taoyuan City, Taiwan

- 大溪木藝生態博物館
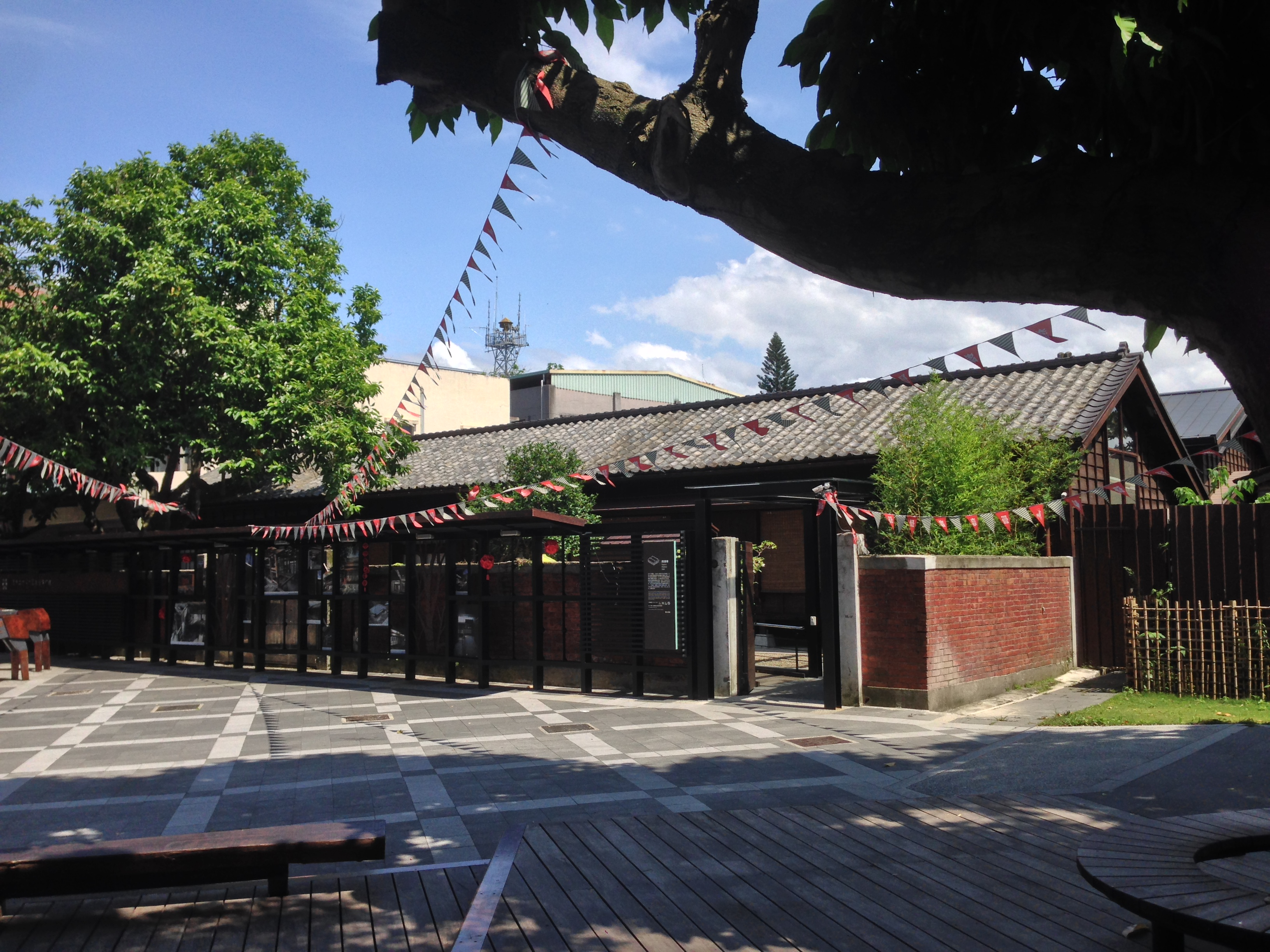
- Established: 1996
- Location: Daxi, Taoyuan City, Taiwan
- Coordinates: 24°52′50.5″N 121°17′12.1″E
- Type: museum

The Daxi Wood Art Ecomuseum (traditional Chinese: 大溪木藝生態博物館; simplified Chinese: 大溪木艺生态博物馆; pinyin: Dàxī Mùyì Shēngtài Bówùguǎn) is a museum complex in Daxi District, Taoyuan City, Taiwan. The idea of ecomuseum is based on Scandinavian concept which emphasizes the integration between local communities and the preservation of cultural assets.

== History ==
The establishment of this museum started with the renovation of building in the area and incorporated them with the local old streets which was initiated in 1996. The first museum building opened to the public is the Number One Hall, a Japanese-style house constructed in the 1920s. It was also the residence for the principle of Daxi Elementary School. The previous owner of the house, Mr. Mao-Lin Chen and his wife Mrs. Cui-Wu Chen-Wang used to teach tailoring classes at the house. The banner hung high up above the front door that reads "Xiguang Tailoring Class" brings back many memories for the women of Daxi. Converted from a private residence to a public space, this old house has been imbued with new life.

In 2014, the museum building underwent renovation. In 2015, the renovation of the first hall and Wude Temple were completed and the two buildings were reopened. In 2016, the Craftsman Story House and the Crafts Exchange Hall were also reopened.

== Architecture ==
The museum complex is divided into the Daxi Wood Art Industry and Daxi Resident Lifestyle. Public buildings include martial arts training center Butokuden and a cluster of 22 Japanese style buildings. The buildings are renovated in different stages according to their age, which will also incorporate the local historical streets and houses to convert Daxi to a cultural museum.

Notable buildings are:

- Daxi Butokuden (Chinese: 武德殿; pinyin: Dà Xī Wǔ Dé Diàn)
- Lee Teng-fan's Ancient Residence (Chinese: 李騰芳古宅; pinyin: Lǐténgfāng Gǔ Zhái)

== See also ==
- List of museums in Taiwan
