= Lin Chung-lung =

Taiwanese writer of children's literature

Lin Chung-lung (Chinese: 林鍾隆; July 24, 1930 – October 18, 2008), also known by his pen name Lin Wai (林外), was a Taiwanese writer of children's literature. Born during the Japanese rule in today's Yangmei, Taoyuan, he graduated from the General Department of Taipei Normal School and served as an elementary, junior high, and high school teacher. He was described by Chung Chao-cheng as a versatile writer. In December 2016, the National Museum of Taiwan Literature published a 30-volume Complete Works of Lin Chung-lung (林鍾隆全集), the first complete works of a children's literature writer to be published in Taiwan.

== Activities ==
Living in the post-war period when the official language was changed from Japanese to Chinese, Lin Chung-lung was one of the first writers to write in Chinese. He rose to fame in the 1960s with his juvenile novel Ah Hui's Heart (阿輝的心), and his children's poem Mother of the Stars (星星的母親) won the Golden Tripod Award for Publications. In April 1977, he founded Taiwan's first children's poetry magazine Pale Moonlight (月光光), leading a new trend of writing, studying, and teaching children's poetry in Taiwan. Moreover, he introduced the translation of Japanese children's writers such as Michio Mado. In addition to writing children's literature, he also devoted himself to rewriting and translating children's reading materials, making significant contributions to Taiwan's children's literature in Taiwan. After his retirement, he was a passionate hiker and wrote many essays and children's poems about the themes of mountains and forests. In addition, he founded the Ancient Path Language Center, which offers self-compiled writing materials to teach writing in a correspondence course format.

As for his novels, scholar Peng Rui-chin described Lin Chung-lung as a "soul explorer" who possesses the poet's unique romantic temperament and meticulous thinking. His literature is based on the pure desire for literature and the exploration of human nature. Writer Ssu-ma Chung-yuan believes that his novels "have a light and exquisite touch, adept at capturing the most delicate aspects of modern life and emotions, and depicting diverse human interests.”
