= Dunhua Road =

Road in Taipei, Taiwan

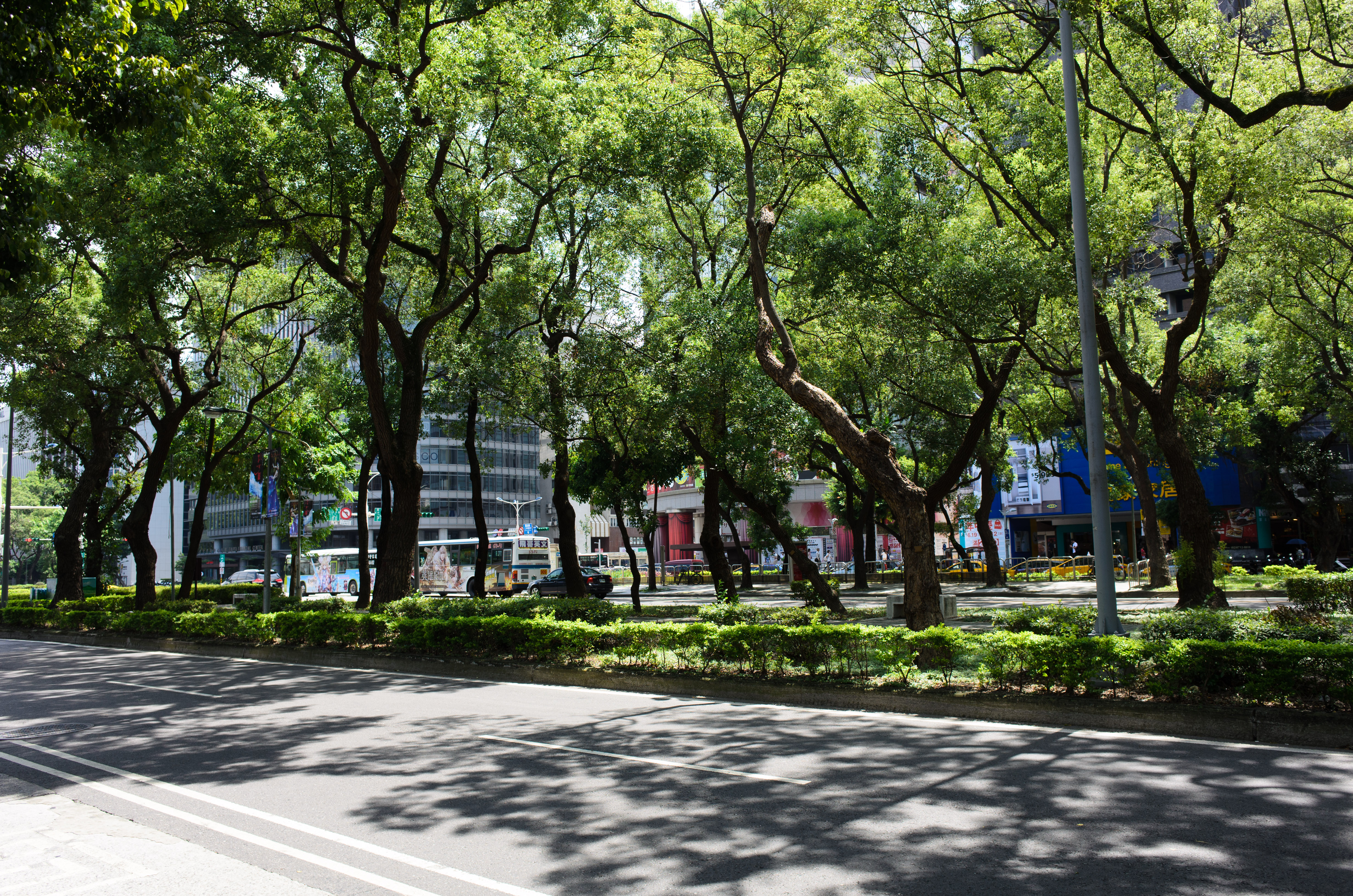
Dunhua North Road

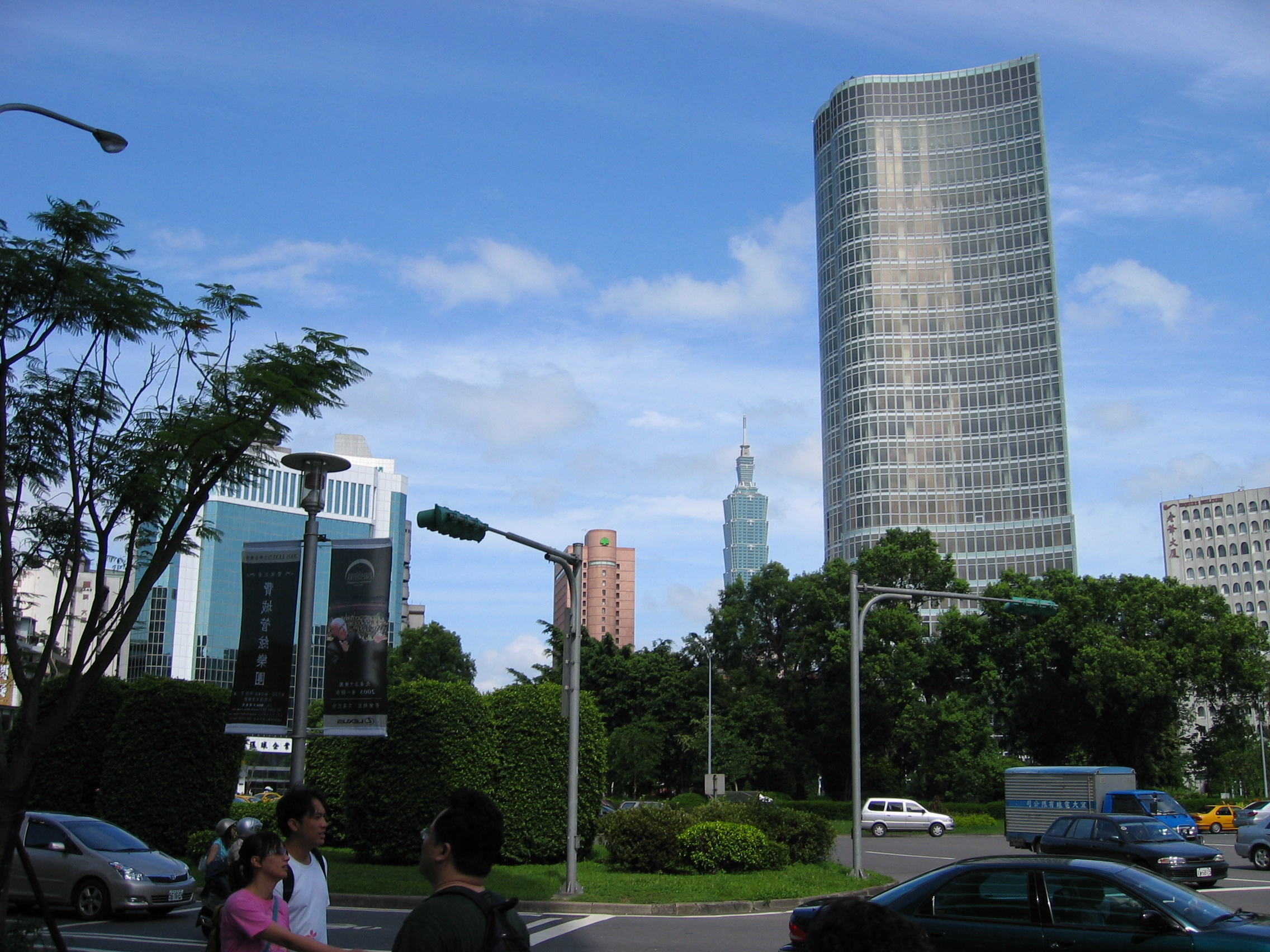
Dunhua South Road

Dunhua Road (Chinese: 敦化路; pinyin: Dūnhuà Lù) is a major north–south arterial road in Taipei, Taiwan. It connects the Songshan Airport and the Songshan District in the north with the Daan District in the south, near the National Taiwan University. The street channels traffic to and from Songshan Airport throughout Taipei. It is known as one of Taipei's more beautiful arterials, mainly because of the large, landscaped medians dividing the express and local lanes.

Dunhua Road is divided into Dunhua North Road (Chinese: 敦化北路) and Dunhua South Road (Chinese: 敦化南路) (at Bade Road), with two numbered sections in the south and no numbered sections in the north.

== Attractions ==
Notable attractions along Dunhua Road includes:

- Taipei Arena
- Asiaworld Department Store (IKEA)
- SOGO
- Taipei Metro Mall
- Chang-Gung Memorial Hospital
- RIMOWA Taiwan Flagship Store (Largest RIMOWA luggage shop in the world)

== Major Intersections ==
=== Dunhua North Road ===
- Minquan East Road
- Minsheng East Road
- Nanjing East Road
- Bade Road

=== Dunhua South Road ===
- Bade Road
- Civic Boulevard
- Zhongxiao East Road
- Renai Road
- Xinyi Road
- Heping Road
- Keelung Road

== See also ==
- List of roads in Taiwan
