= Nanjing Road (Taipei) =

Road in Taiwan

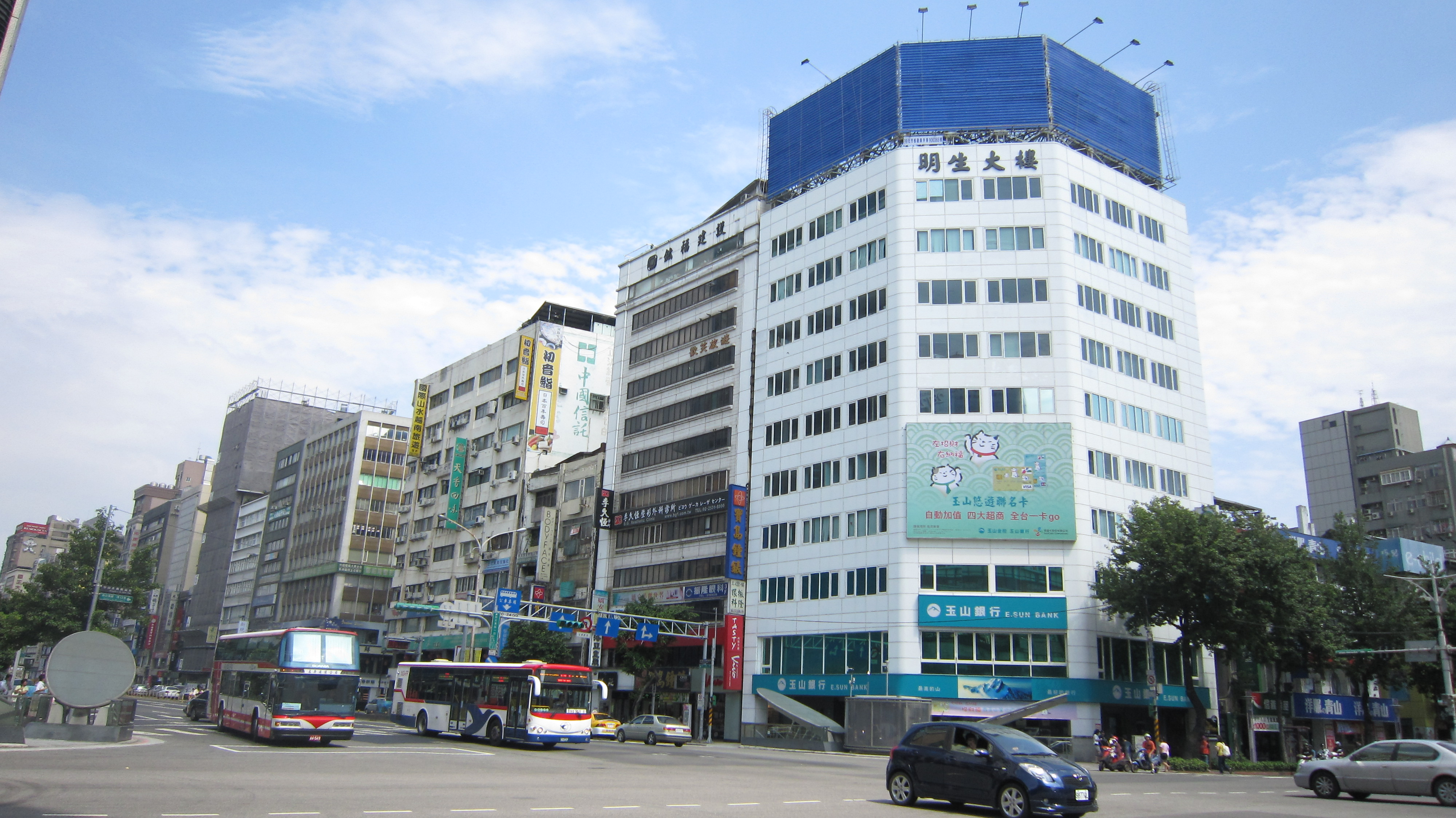
Nanjing East Road

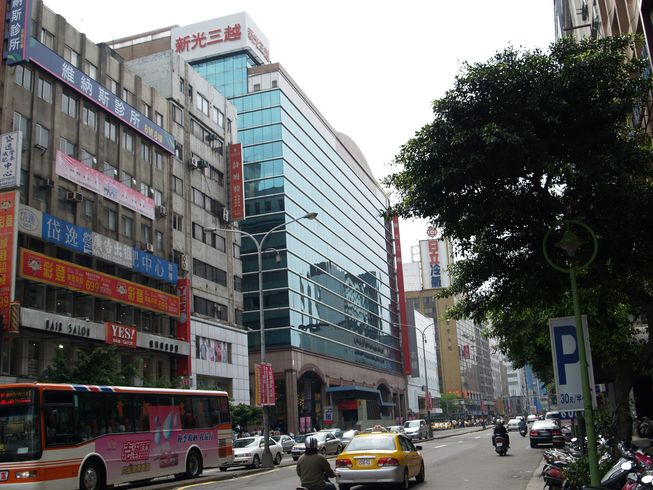
Nanjing West Road

Nanjing Road (Chinese: 南京路; pinyin: Nánjīng Lù) is a major arterial road in Taipei, Taiwan, connecting the Datong district in the west with the Zhongshan and Songshan districts in the east. Nanjing Road is known for heavy traffic channeling from the MacArthur Bridge into central Taipei. There are bus lanes and platforms in the middle of the roadway to facilitate transit on the roadway. Taipei Metro’s Green line runs under Nanjing Road for most of the corridor.

== Major intersections ==
- Zhongshan Road
- Linsen Road
- Xinsheng Road
- Jianguo Road
- Fuxing Road
- Dunhua Road
- Jiankang Road
- Guangfu Road
- Sanmin Road
- Tayou Road, Keelung Road

== See also ==
- List of roads in Taiwan
