= The former Taiwan Important Material Battalion =

Historic building in Taiwan

The former Taiwan Important Material Authority is a historic building in Taipei City. Its registered name of historic building comes from the fact that the building was once owned by the "Taiwan Important Material Battalion" during the Japanese colonial period. After the World War II, it was liquidated and taken over. In 1953, it was allocated to the Audit Department as the office until the new audit building was completed in 1991. In 2022, it was transferred from the Audit Department to the National Taiwan Museum, and it is expected to be used as an administrative office.

== History ==
The historic building “former Taiwan Important Materials Authority (TIMA)” in Taipei City was in the possession of the TIMA during the Japanese colonial period. It was located at No. 68, Hua Shan Din at that time. Founded in 1944, the TMIB is a semi-official organization that handles the import and export of Taiwan materials during the war, and has relevant assets in various parts of Taiwan. After World War 2, the movable and immovable properties under the jurisdiction of TIMB were taken over by the Office of the Chief Executive of Taiwan Province. On November 5, 1945, the “Taiwan Provincial Trading Company” was established after liquidation and integration of Japanese assets. On February 11, 1946, it was renamed “Taiwan Provincial Trade Bureau”, which was removed in 1947.

It has not been confirmed whether the Taiwan Provincial Trading Company had directly used it after takeover, but according to the transcript, the building was officially allocated to the Audit Department as the office in 1953 which used it until 1991 when the relevant personnel moved out successively after the completion of the new Audit Building. The building was gradually vacated and idled. During this period, the Audit Department proposed the "Modification Plan for the Old Building of the Audit Department on Zhongxiao East Road", but it was not approved by the Executive Yuan.

In 2016, the building was reviewed and decided by the Taipei City Cultural Assets Review Committee meeting. It has no cultural heritage preservation value and has no designated registration as cultural heritage. However, in July 2016, the Cultural Heritage Preservation Act was amended. Cultural heritage value assessment shall be conducted by competent authorities for any public buildings and auxiliary facilities over 50 years after completion before disposal. Later it was announced and registered as historic buildings on December 3, 2020.

The National Human Rights Committee of the Control Yuan met on September 2, 2020, and expected to use it as an office building. In 2022, the building was officially transferred from the Audit Department to the National Taiwan Museum. A public hearing was held on the restoration and reuse plan on September 7, 2020. It is anticipated that the building's office functions will be continued and it will be reused as the National Taiwan Museum's administrative office.

== Architectural Features ==
According to the registration announcement, the building was completed around the 1940s, presumably no later than 1944. The three-story building is located at an important street corner in the urban landscape. It is an office building type. In 1953, it was assigned to the Audit Department as the office of the central government agency. Later, modification and expansion were carried out. Currently the appearance of the facade has also changed, but the original appearance of the internal structure and compartments have remained.
