= Fuxing Road (Taipei) =

Road in Taipei, Taiwan

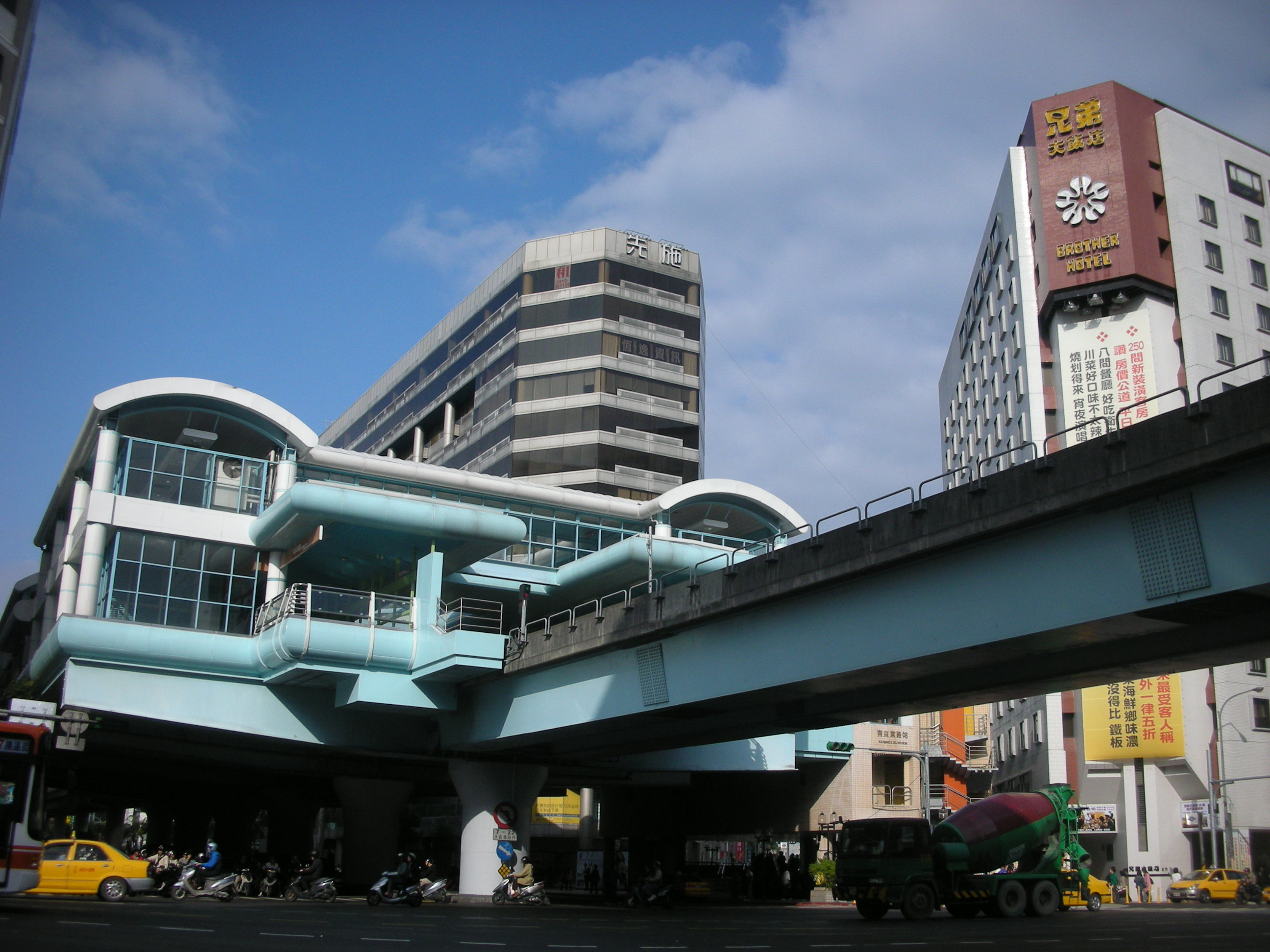
Fuxing North Road

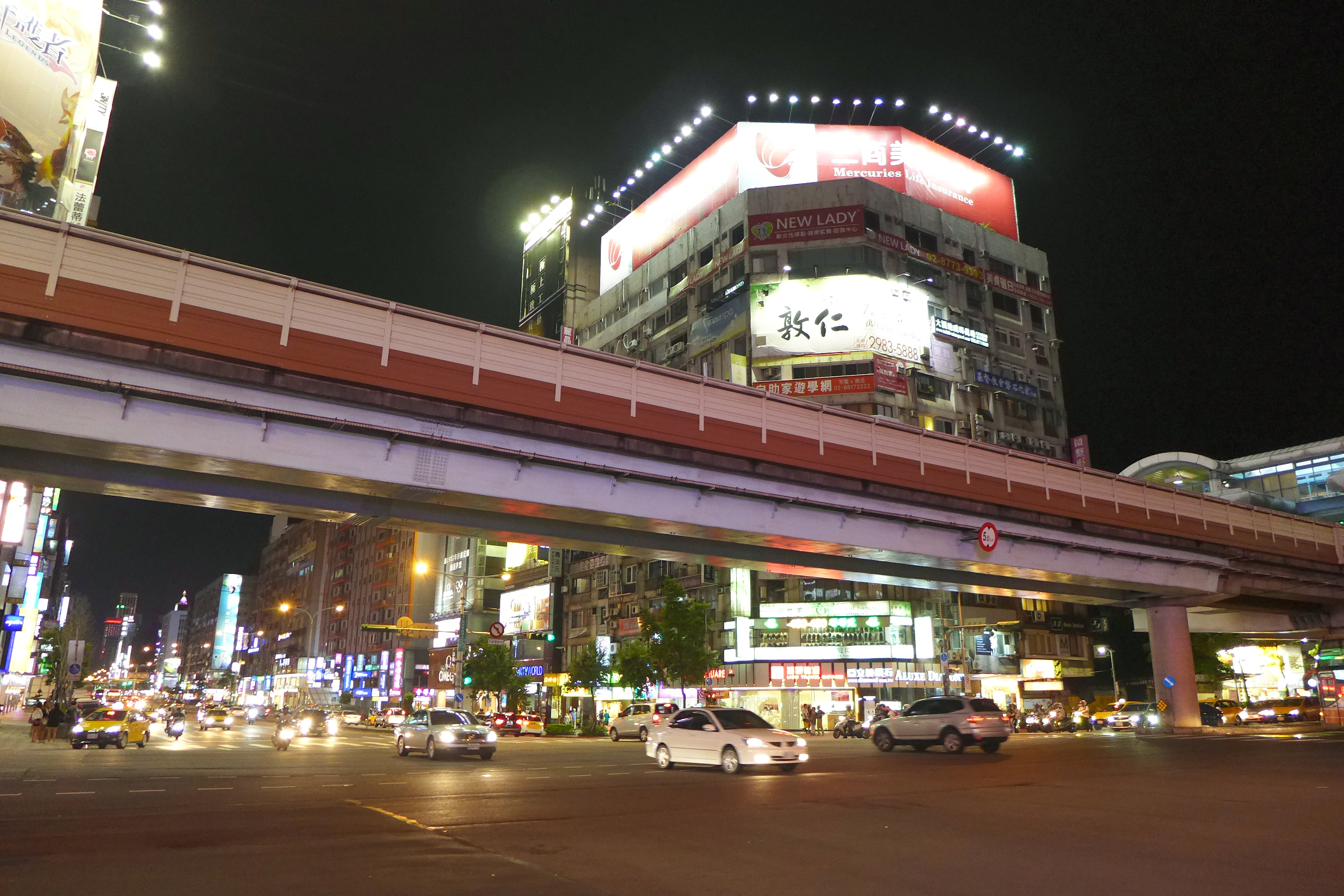
Fuxing South Road

Fuxing Road (Chinese: 復興路; pinyin: Fùxīng Lù) is a major arterial road in Taipei connecting the Da'an District and the National Taiwan University in the south with the Zhongzheng, Zhongshan, and Songshan districts around the northern terminus.

Fuxing Road is known for the many elaborate shopping malls located along the road, such as the Taipei SOGO, the Breeze Center, and the Sunrise Department Store.

Fuxing Road is divided into north and south sections by Zhongxiao East Road, as is with most north–south arterials in Taipei. The southern section is divided into two numbered sections, while the northern section has no numbered sections.

Most of the Taipei Metro's Wenshan Line runs above Fuxing Road, with provisions along the road for the line's extension to Neihu.

In November 2006, Taipei opened a new section of Fuxing Road between Minzu East Road and the Dazhi Bridge, providing a new connection between the Dazhi neighborhood and central Taipei without having to drive around Songshan Airport. The new connection is a four-lane tunnel travelling under Songshan Airport and is restricted to motorized vehicles only.

== Major Intersections ==
=== Fuxing North Road ===
- Minzu East Road
- Minquan East Road
- Minsheng East Road
- Nanjing East Road
- Changan East Road

=== Fuxing South Road ===
- Zhongxiao East Road
- Renai East Road
- Xinyi East Road
- Heping East Road
- Xinhai Road/Xinhai Expressway

== See also ==
- List of roads in Taiwan
