= Xinyi District, Taipei =

District of Taipei, Taiwan

Coordinates: 25°02′09″N 121°34′06″E

Xinyi 信義區 Sinyi, Hsinyi, Shingi
- District
- Xinyi District
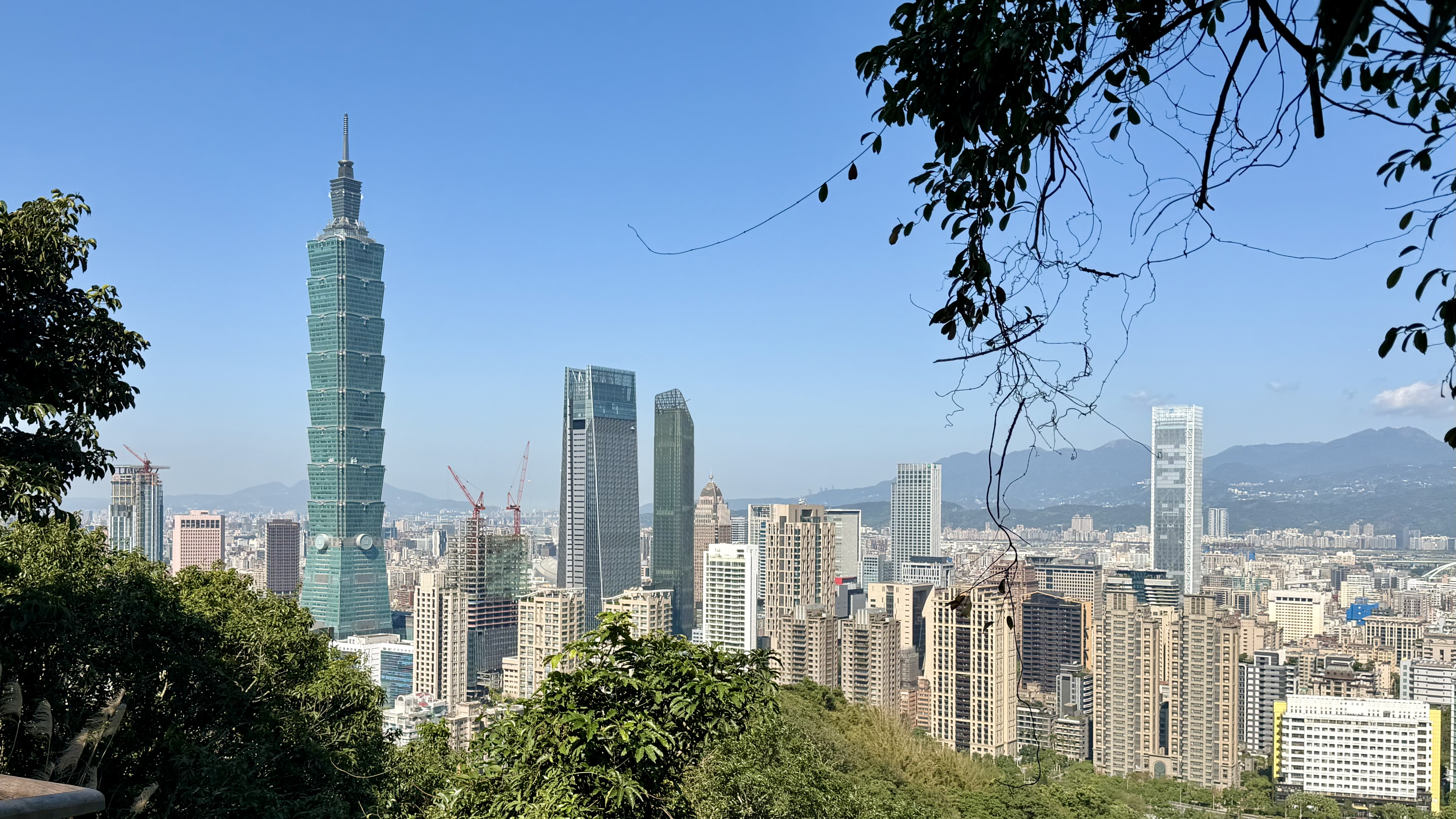
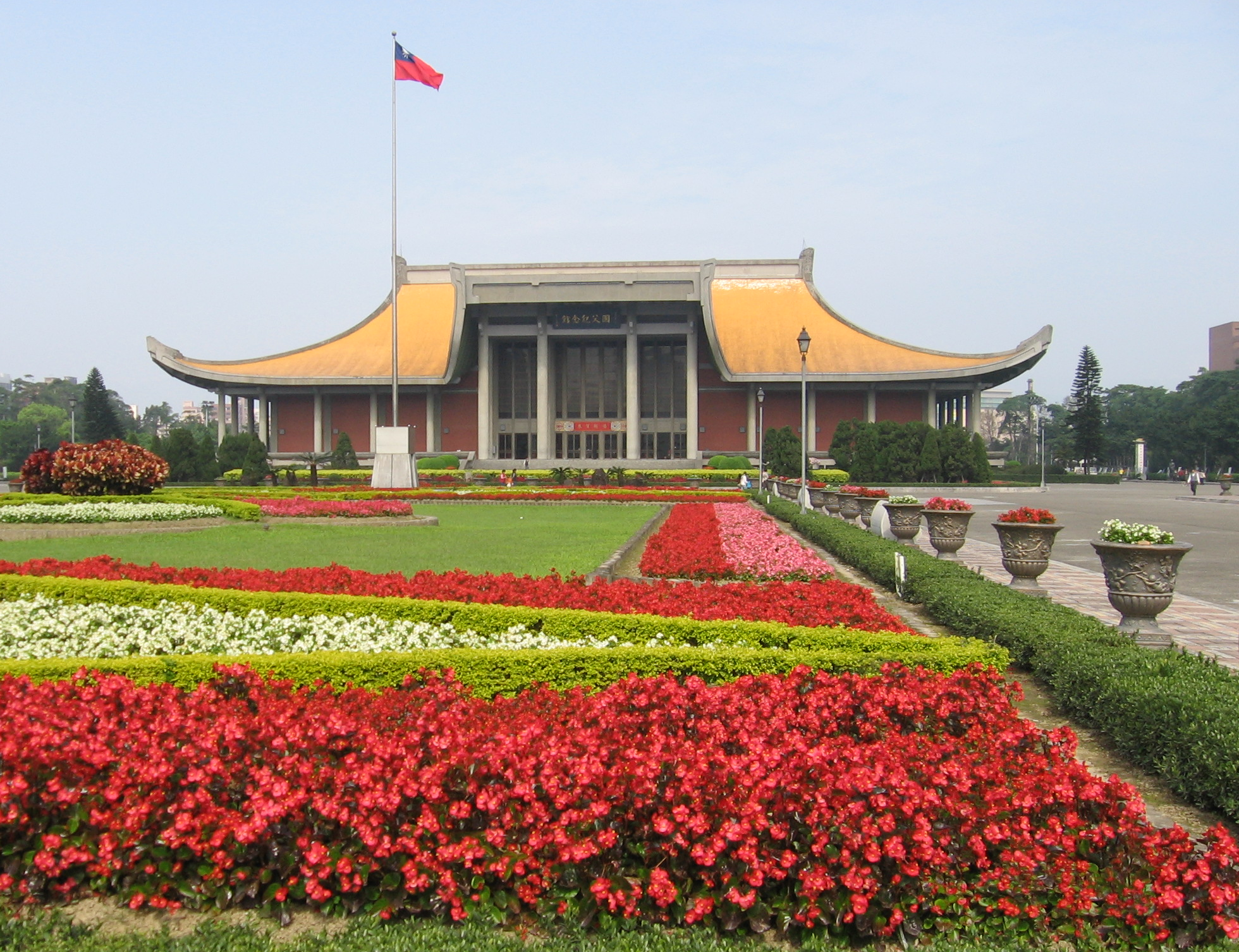
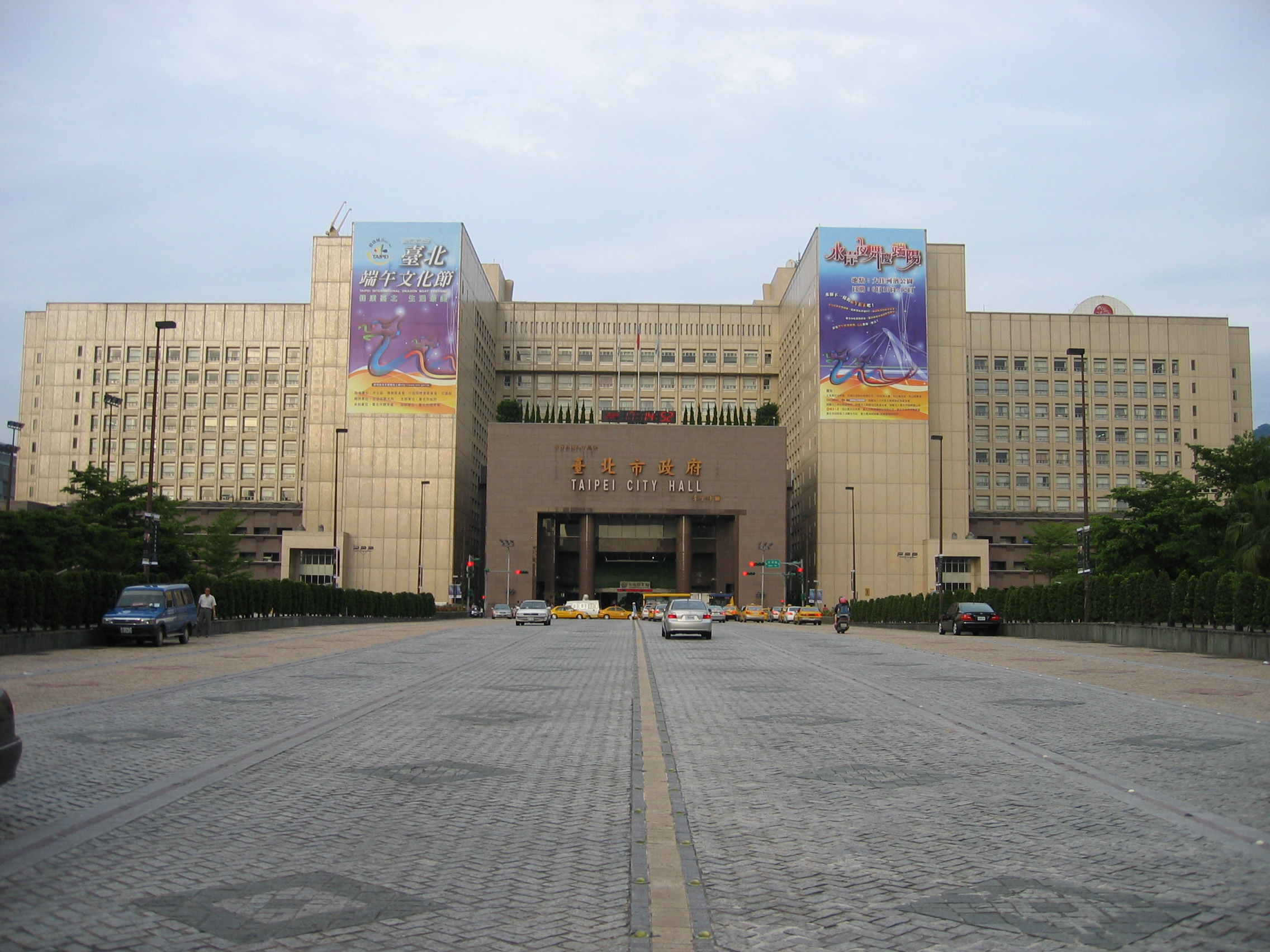
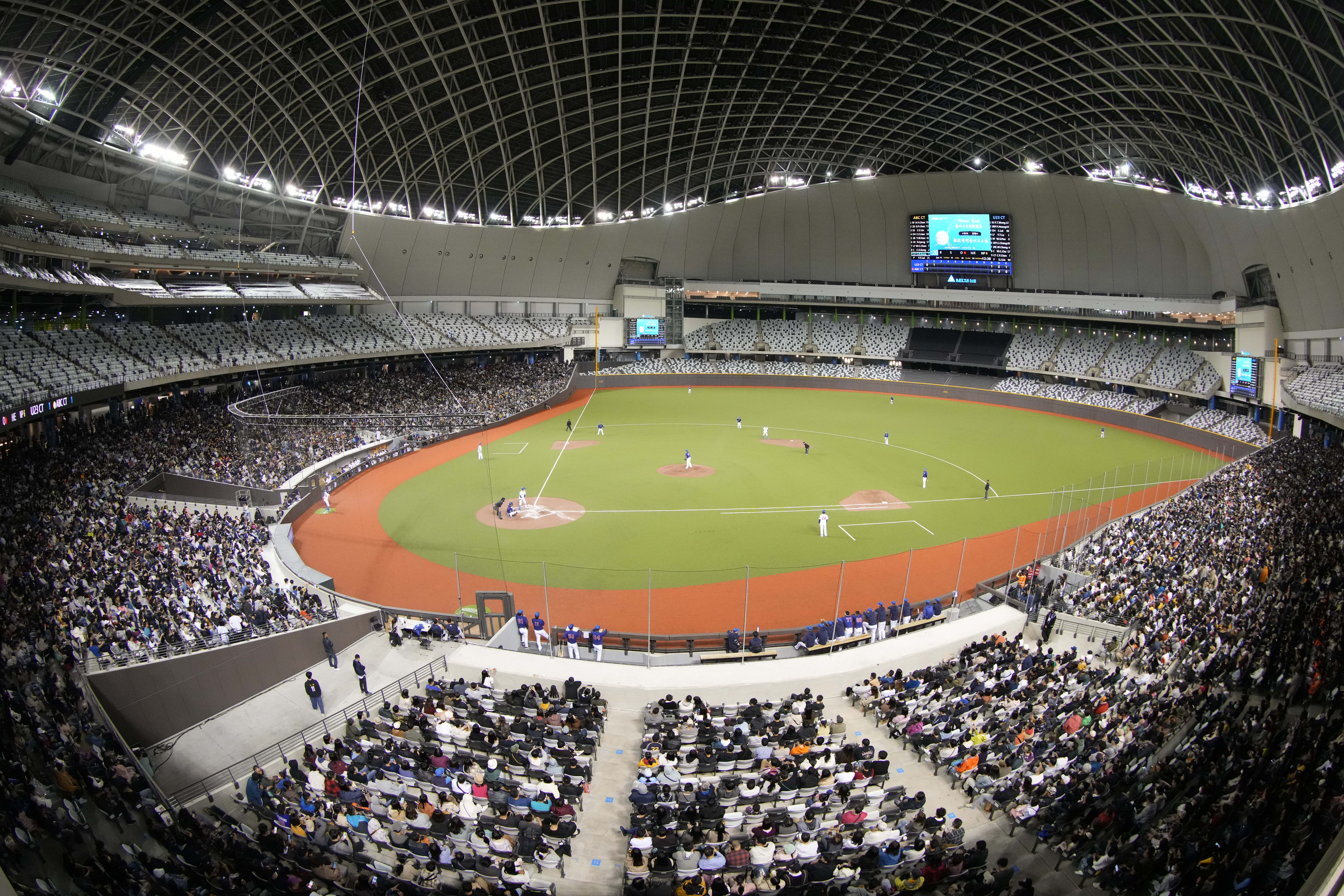
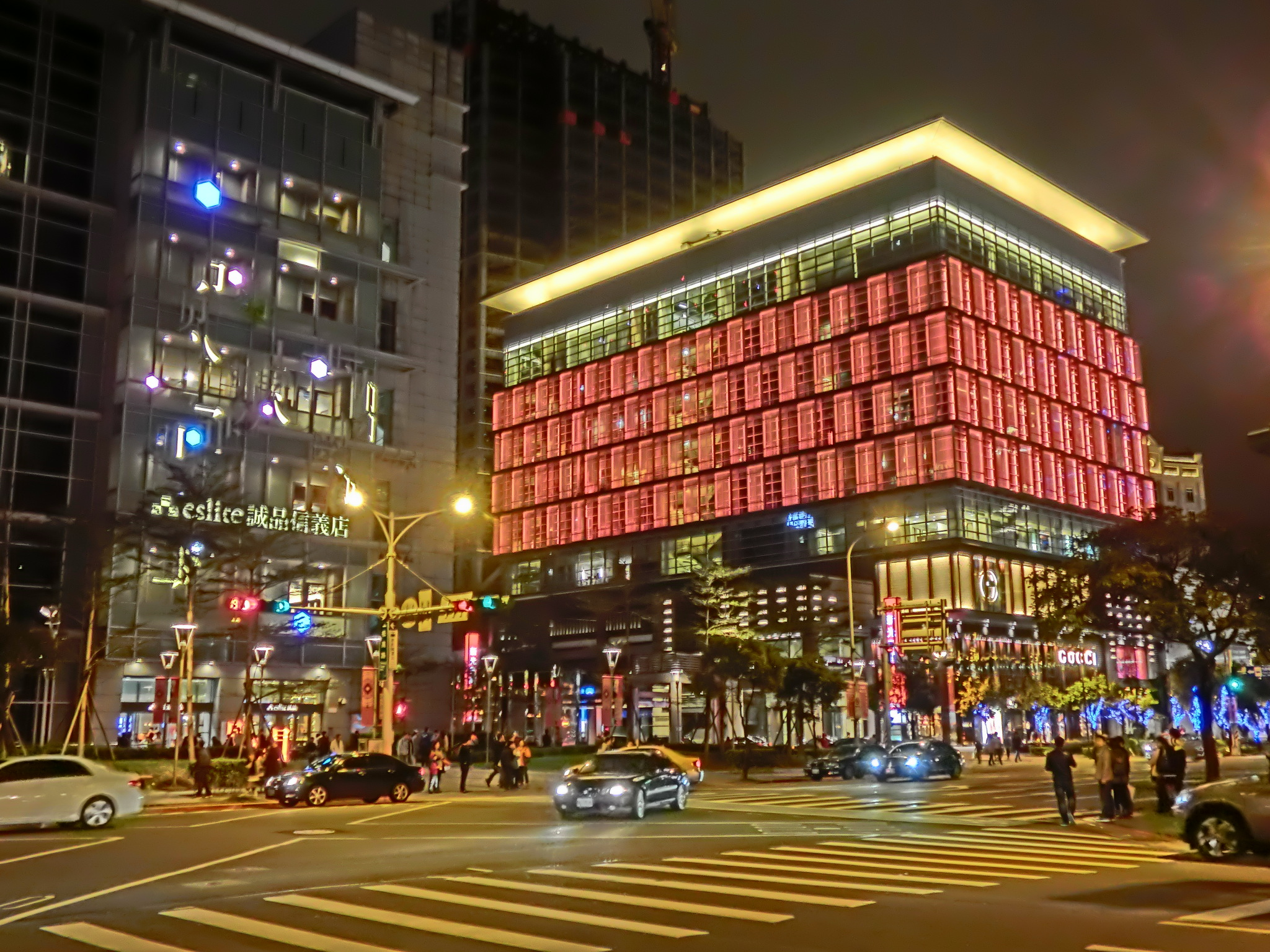
- From top left to right: Skyline of the Xinyi Planning District, Sun Yat-sen Memorial Hall (Taipei), Taipei City Hall, Taipei Dome, Xinyi Shopping District.
- Interactive map of Xinyi
- Country: Republic of China (Taiwan)
- Region: Eastern Taipei
- Divisions: List: 41 villages; 909 neighborhoods

Area
  - Total: 11.2077 km^{2} (4.3273 sq mi)
  - Rank: Ranked 8th of 12

Population (January 2023)
  - Total: 204,414
  - Rank: Ranked 6th of 12
  - Density: 18,238.7/km^{2} (47,238.0/sq mi)
- Postal code: 110
- Website: xydo.gov.taipei (in Chinese)

Xinyi District, Taipei
- Traditional Chinese: 信義區
- Simplified Chinese: 信义区
- Literal meaning: honesty
Transcriptions
Standard Mandarin
- Hanyu Pinyin: Xìnyì Qū
- Bopomofo: ㄒㄧㄣˋ ㄧˋ ㄑㄩ
- Wade–Giles: Hsin^{4}-i^{4} Ch‘ü^{1}
- Tongyong Pinyin: Shìnyì Chu
- IPA: [ɕîn.î tɕʰý]
Hakka
- Romanization: Sin-ngi-khî
Yue: Cantonese
- Yale Romanization: Seunyih Kēui
- Jyutping: seun4 ji6 keoi1
- IPA: [sɵn˧.ji˨ kʰɵɥ˥]
Southern Min
- Hokkien POJ: Sìn-gī-khu

Xingya (old name)
- Traditional Chinese: 興雅
Transcriptions
Standard Mandarin
- Hanyu Pinyin: Xīngyǎ
- Bopomofo: ㄒㄧㄥ ㄧㄚˇ
- Wade–Giles: Hsing^{1}-ya^{3}
- Tongyong Pinyin: Singyǎ
- IPA: [ɕíŋ.jà]
Yue: Cantonese
- Yale Romanization: Hīngngáh
- Jyutping: hing1 ngaa5
- IPA: [hɪŋ˥.ŋa˩˧]

Xinyi District or Sinyi District is a district of Taipei, Taiwan.

Xinyi District (Chinese: 信義區) includes Taipei 101, Taipei International Convention Center, Taipei World Trade Center, Sun Yat-sen Memorial Hall and various shopping malls and entertainment venues.

== History and geography ==
During Japanese rule (1895–1945), Matsuyama Village (Japanese: 松山庄) covered modern day Xinyi and Songshan districts. The village was named after Matsuyama City in Japan and formed part of Shichisei District, Taihoku Prefecture. Matsuyama Village was incorporated into Taihoku City (modern-day Taipei) in 1938. It was renamed Songshan District in 1945.

In 1990, Songshan District was split in two as part of a citywide reorganization. The southern half became Xinyi District while the northern half retained its name. The present border of Xinyi runs along Civic Boulevard. Xinyi is separated from the Nangang District on the east by Fude St.; from Wenshan District in the south by Baozijiang and Poneikeng (坡內坑) Mountains; and from Daan District in the west by the Zhuangjing Tunnel (莊敬隧道), Keelung Road and Guangfu Road. Development of the area in the 1990s transformed Xinyi into a modern shopping district which by 2010 boasted the highest property values in Taiwan.

== Government institutions ==
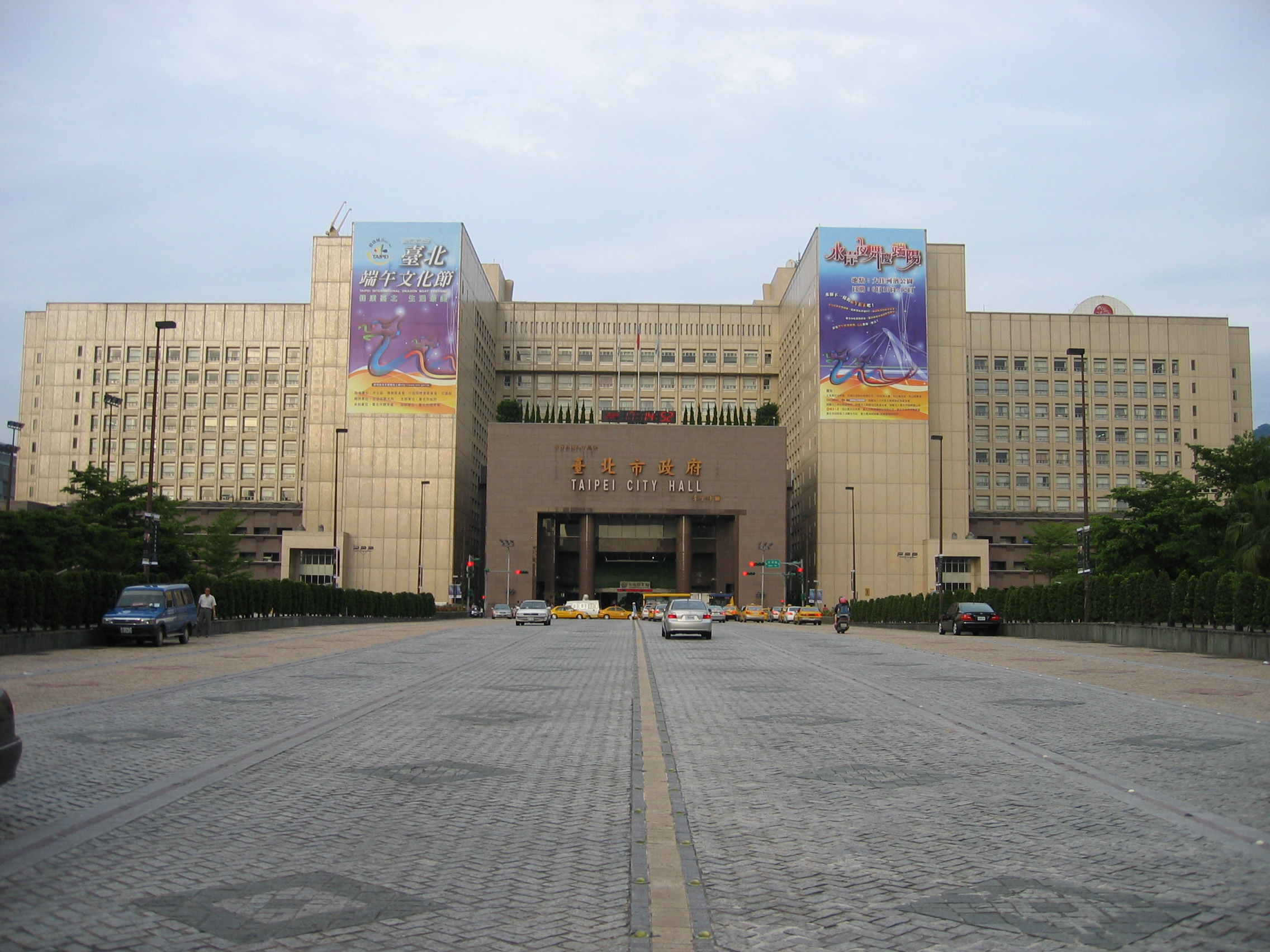
Taipei City Hall

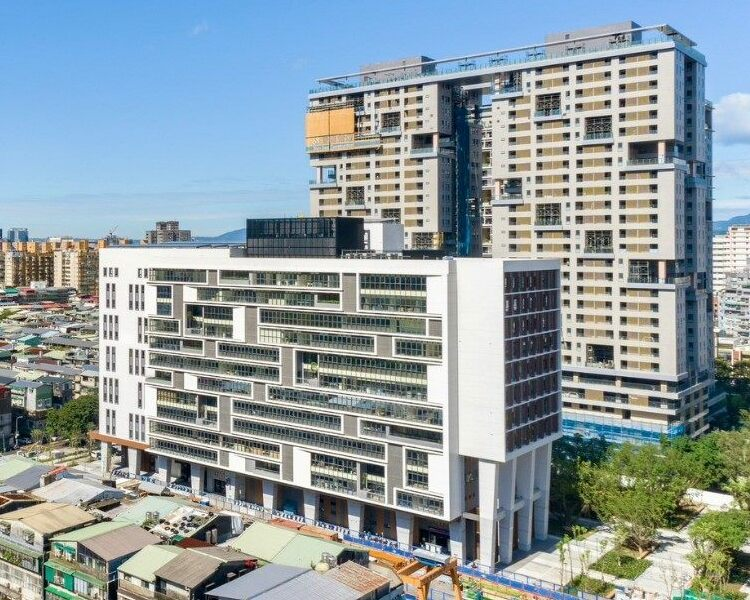
Xinyi Administration Center Building

- Taipei City Council
- Taipei City Government
- Veterans Affairs Council
- Public Construction Commission

== Diplomatic missions and representative offices ==
- Australian Office in Taipei
- British Office Taipei
- Canadian Trade Office in Taipei
- German Institute Taipei
- India-Taipei Association
- Mexican Trade Services Documentation and Cultural Office
- Nigeria Trade Office in Taiwan, R.O.C.
- Commercial Office of Peru to Taipei
- Hong Kong Economic, Trade and Cultural Office
- Macau Economic and Cultural Office

== Education ==
- Taipei Medical University
- Taipei Municipal Song Shan Senior High School
- Taipei Municipal Yongchun High School (台北市立永春高級中學)
- Songshan High School of Agriculture and Industry (台北市立松山高級工農職業學校)
- Taipei Municipal Liugong Junior High School(台北市立瑠公國民中學)
- Taipei Municipal Xin'Yi Junior High School (台北市立信義國民中學)
- Taipei Municipal Xingya Junior High School (台北市立興雅國民中學)
- Taipei Municipal Fude Elementary School (台北市立福德國民小學)
- Taipei Municipal Bo'ai Elementary School (台北市立博愛國民小學)
- Taipei Municipal Sanxing Elementary School (台北市立三興國民小學)

== Famous landmarks and places of interest ==
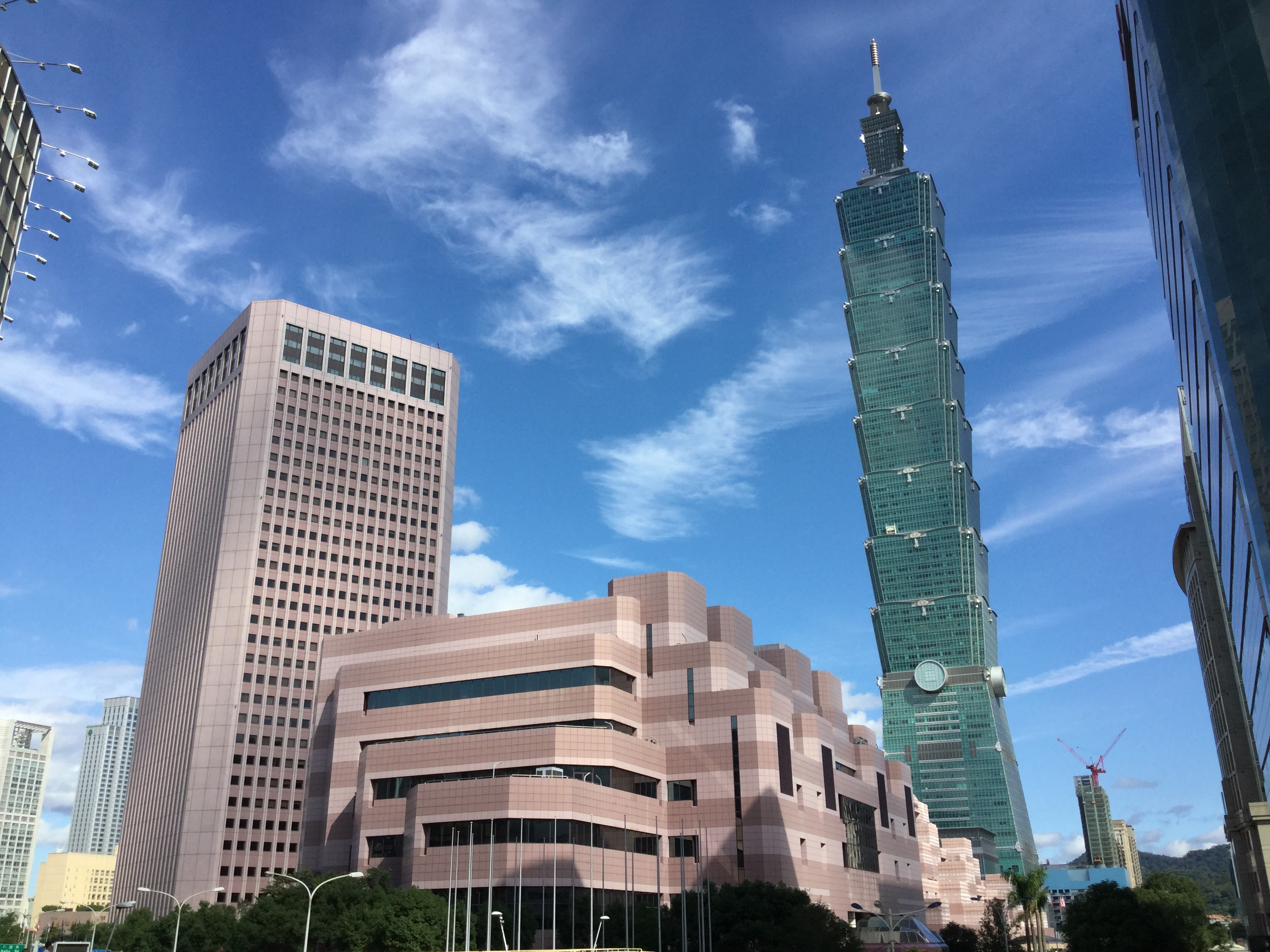
Xinyi District Skyline with Taipei 101 on the right.

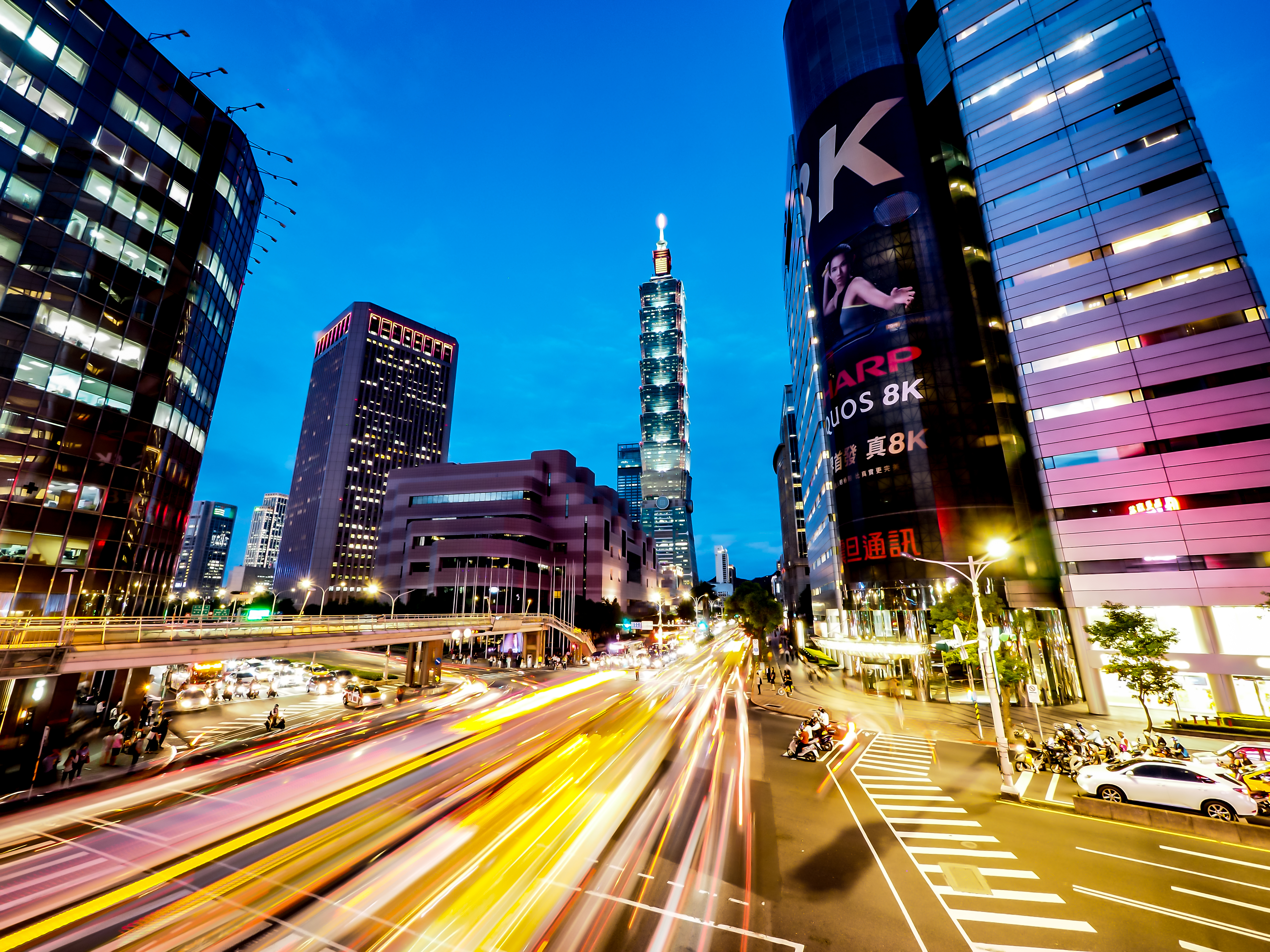
Xinyi District night view

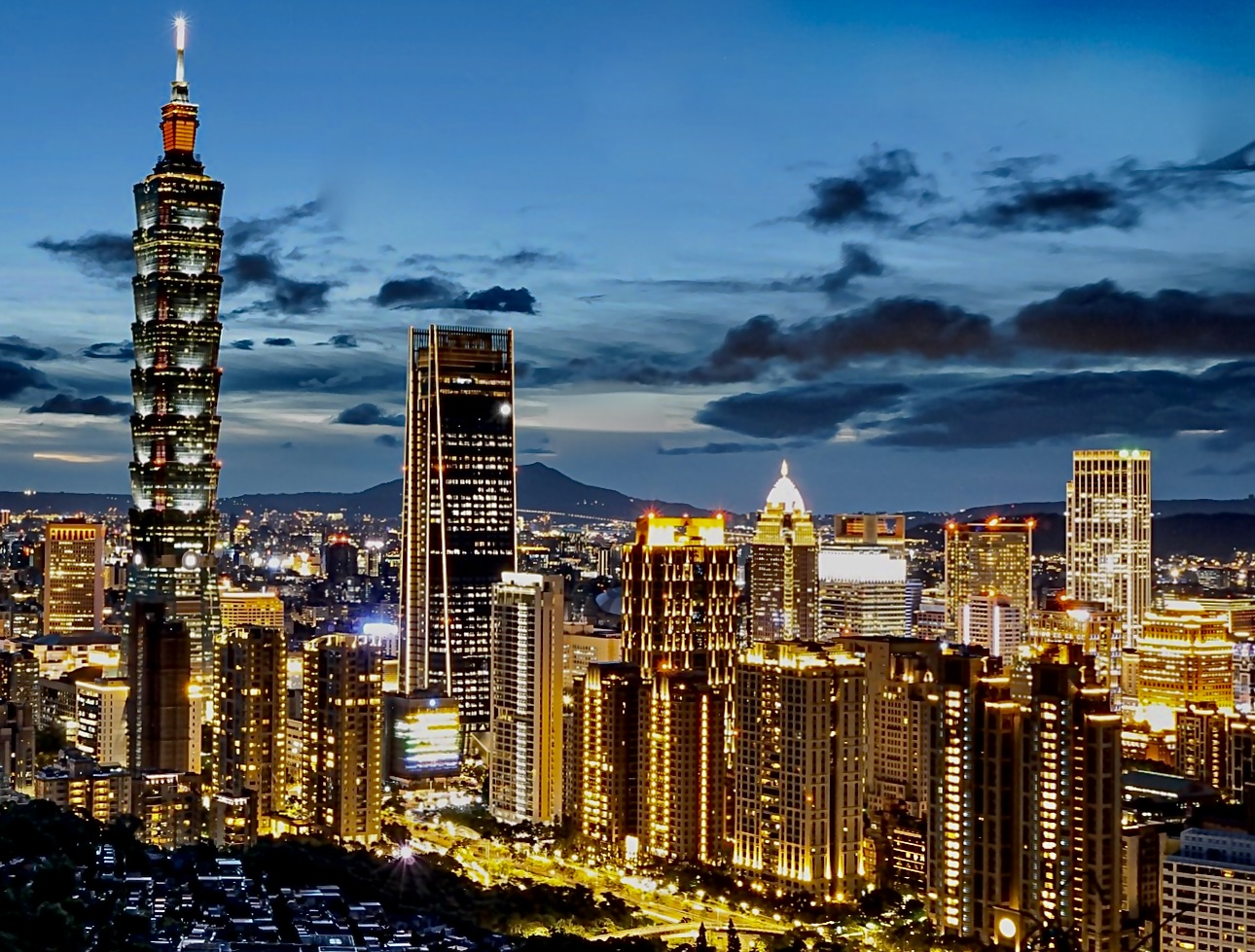
Xinyi District from Xiangshan

- Taipei 101

At 508.2 m (1,667 ft) tall, Taipei 101 was the tallest building in the World from 2004 to 2010 and is still currently Asia's 6th tallest building and the ninth tallest building in the world, as of November 2018. Visitors can visit the 89th floor observatory by means of the world's second fastest elevator (63 km/h or 37.5 mph).

- Taipei City Hall

Taipei City Hall is located on City Hall Rd. (市府路). The plaza outside city hall, Citizen's Square (市民廣場), is often used as a concert venue including the annual New Year's celebrations.

- Shin Kong Mitsukoshi

Shin Kong Mitsukoshi, a high-end Japanese department store, operates four buildings in the district. The buildings are (in order from least floor space to most floor space): A4, which specializes in women's fashion, has, among other retail stores, a Hands Tailung store, a Häagen-Dazs, and a supermarket; A9, which houses expensive international boutiques and has a large fnac store on B2; A11, which features products for the entire family. Each building has a number of restaurants, featuring cuisines from around the world.

- Eslite Bookstore

Eslite Bookstore, Taiwan's premier bookstore, opened their flagship store in the district in early 2006. Spanning over 7 floors, this bookstore is the largest in Taiwan. The bookstore has an expansive magazine collection (especially foreign magazines), a floor dedicated to children's books, a Japanese bookstore, art bookstore, Simplified Chinese book collection, and more. There are event halls where authors address their articles or topics related to their books.

- ATT 4 FUN (formerly New York New York)

Located at 12, Songshou Rd (台北市松壽路12號9樓), this building was formerly called New York New York. After ATT Group bought the mall in 2010 it was closed, remodeled, and opened under the name ATT 4 FUN in the second half of 2011. The mall features 11 floors of shopping, restaurants, and clubs.

- Historic Coal Mines

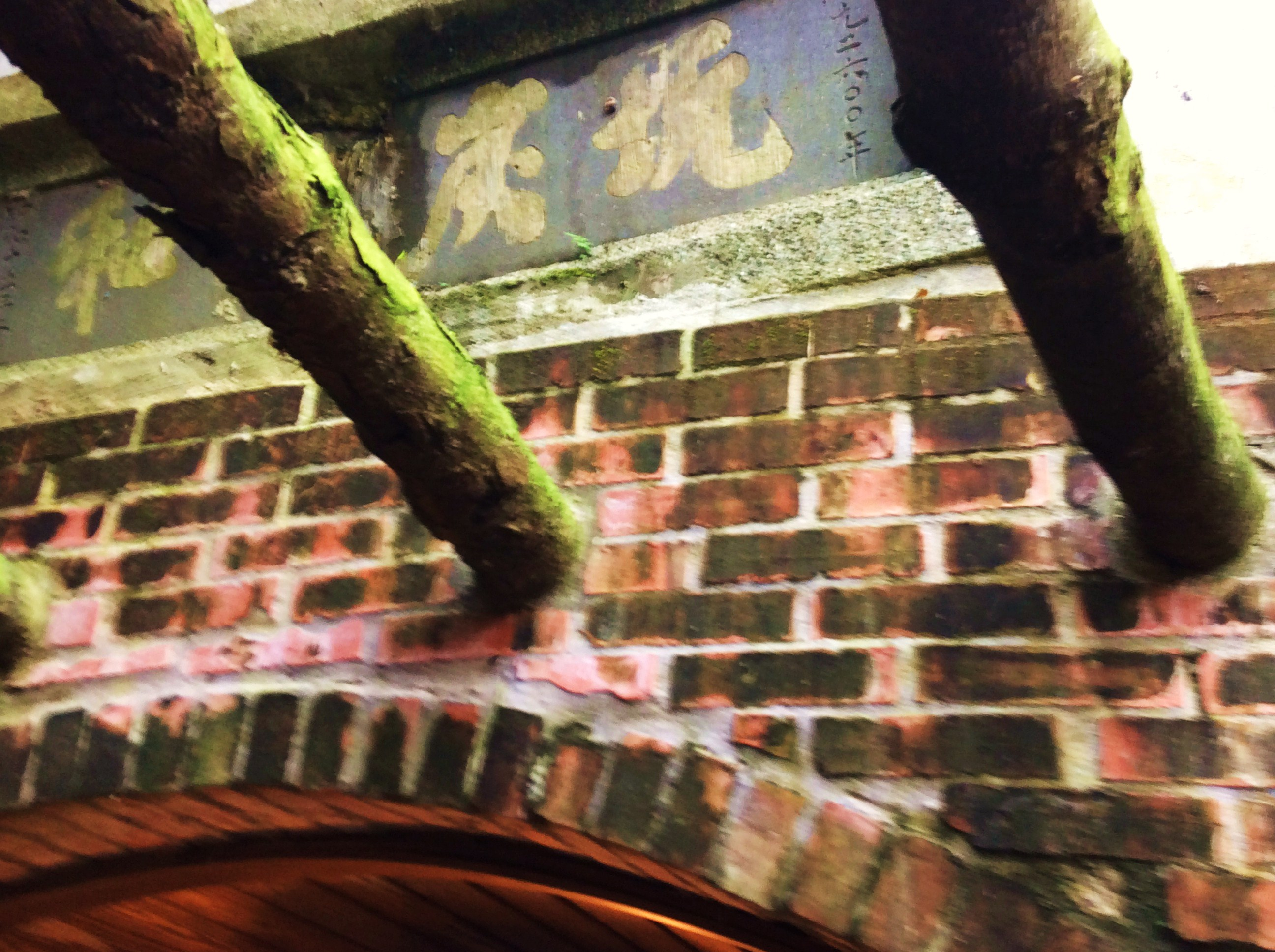
Plaque of the Hexing Coal Mine

Xinyi District has several historic coal mines from the Japanese colonial period. Two of them have been renovated: the Hexing Mine (和興炭坑), Alley 471, Lane 150, Section 5, Xinyi Road, and the Dexing Mine (德興炭坑) near the trailhead of the Tiaomi Trail, Alley 100, Lane 600, Wuxing Road.

- Martial Law Era Victims of Political Violence Memorial Park

This historic memorial of victims of the "White Terror" is located on a hillside overlooking the present Taipei 101 shopping district.

- Xiangshan

A 183 m (600 ft) tall mountain with views of Taipei at the peak. Its trail begins about 700 m (2300 ft) south of Exit 2 of the Xiangshan metro station.

== Economy ==
Many corporate headquarters and hotels are located in Xinyi District.

== Tallest buildings 150m+ ==
Zone	Name of Building	Image	Height(m)	Number of floors	Status	Year
A22	Taipei 101 (臺北101)		508.2	101	Completed	2004
A7	Taipei Sky Tower (臺北天空塔)		280	46	Under Construction	2021
A15/18/20	Taipei Nan Shan Plaza (臺北南山廣場)		272	48	Completed	2018
A25	Fubon Xinyi A25 (富邦信義A25)		266	52	Under Construction	2020
A21	Nanshan Xinyi A21 (南山A21)		232.6	43	Under Construction	
A3	Cathay Landmark (國泰置地廣場)		212	46	Completed	2015
A1	Farglory Financial Center (遠雄金融中心)		208.3	32	Completed	2012
B6	Hua Nan Bank Headquarters (華南銀行總行世貿大樓)		154.5	27	Completed	2014
A2	Uni-President International Tower (統一國際大樓)		154	30	Completed	2004
Station	Taipei City Hall Bus Station (市府轉運站)		151	31	Completed	2010

== Transportation ==
=== Rail ===
Xinyi District is served by the following stations of the Taipei Metro:

- Wenhu line: Linguang, Liuzhangli
- Tamsui–Xinyi line: Xiangshan, Taipei 101–World Trade Center
- Bannan line: Sun Yat-sen Memorial Hall, Taipei City Hall, Yongchun, Houshanpi metro station
- Circular line: Yongchun, Xiangshan, Sanzhangli

In addition, the north of the district is served by Taiwan Railway Songshan station.

=== Road ===
Buses to Xinyi District are also plentiful from all parts of Taipei, with a major bus terminal at Taipei City Hall Bus Station. There are also many arteries and freeways in the area, including Zhongxiao East Rd. (part of Sec. 4 & Sec 5), Keelung Rd. (first 2 sections), Xinyi Rd. (part of Sec. 4 & Sec 5), Renai Rd. (part of Sec. 4), Provincial Highway 5, and the Civic Boulevard Expressway.

=== Pedestrian ===
Shin Kong Mitsukoshi, Vieshow Cinemas, ATT 4 Fun, and Taipei 101 Mall are interconnected by an elevated walkway.

== Gallery ==
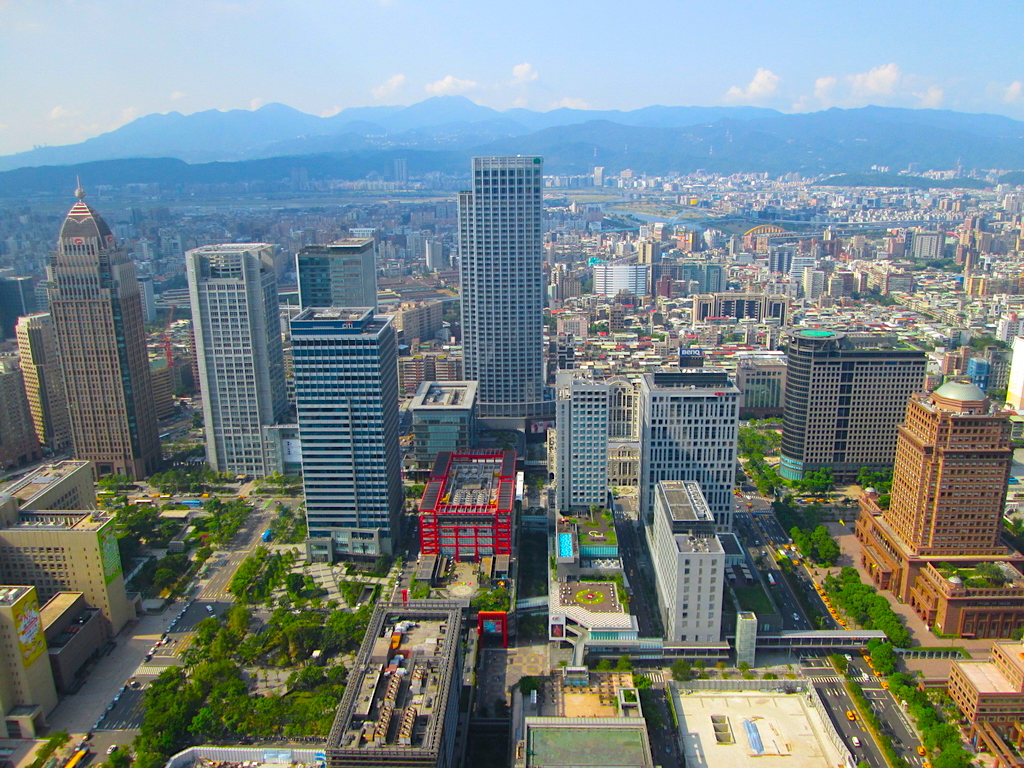
View of Xinyi District from Taipei Nan Shan Plaza Observatory.

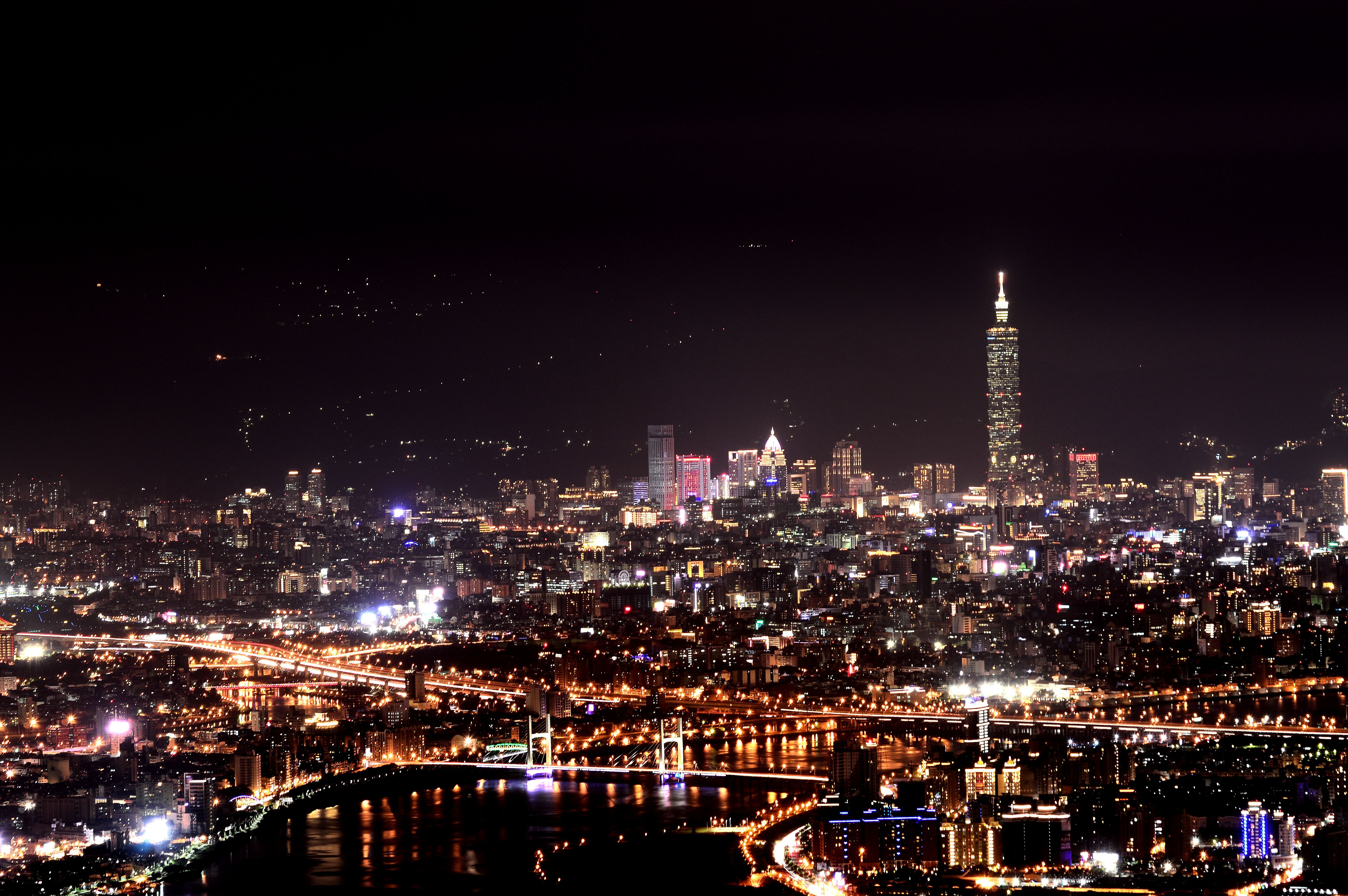
Xinyi District Night Cityscape

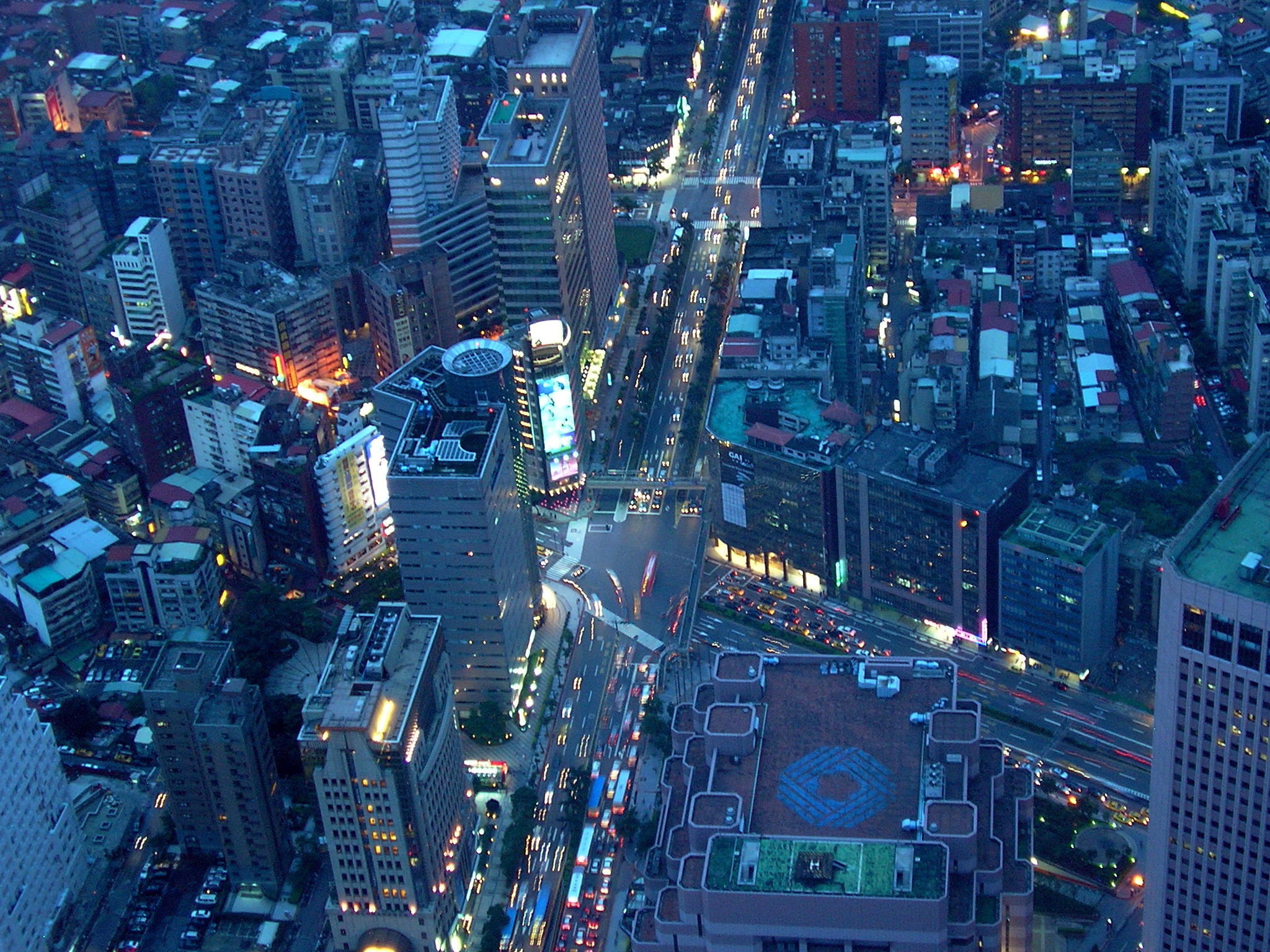
Xinyi District rush hour

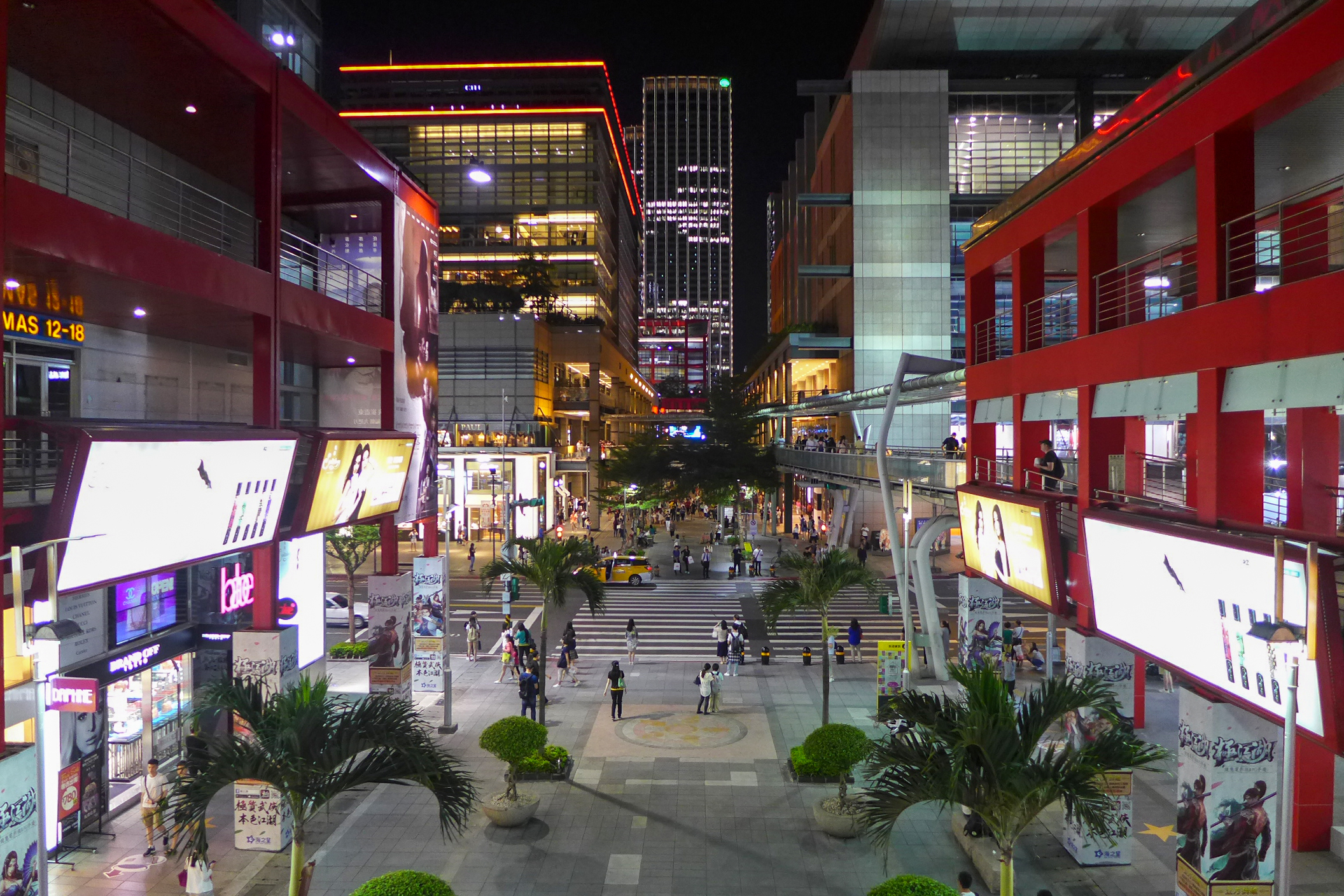
Xinyi District Avenue Night view

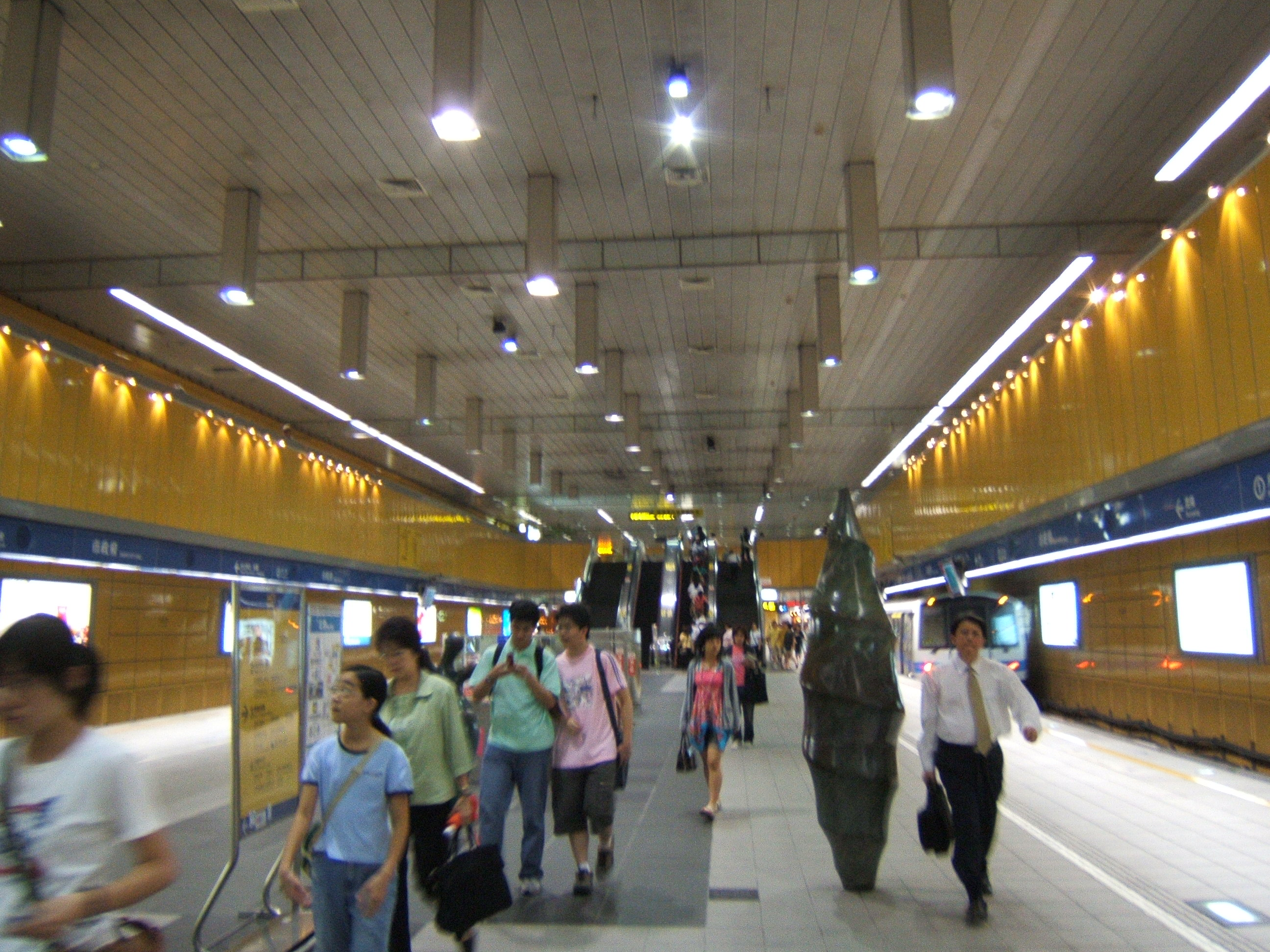
Taipei City Hall Station

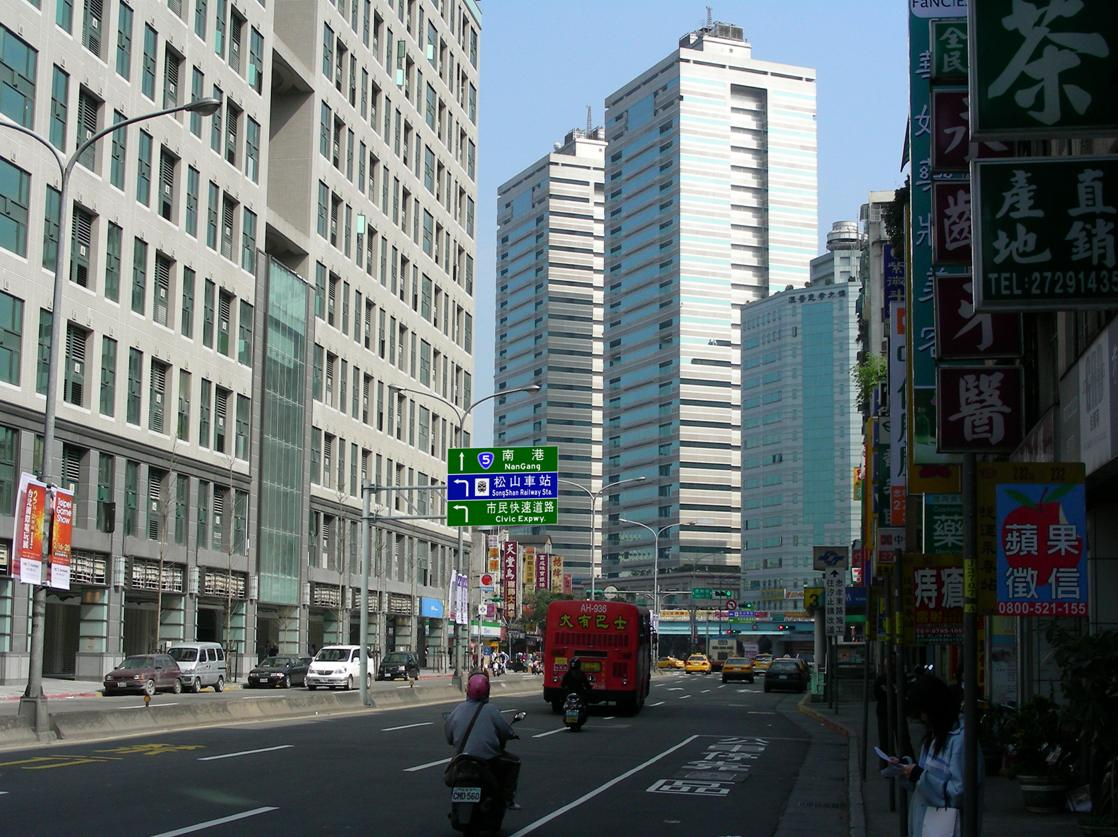
Zhongxiao East Road

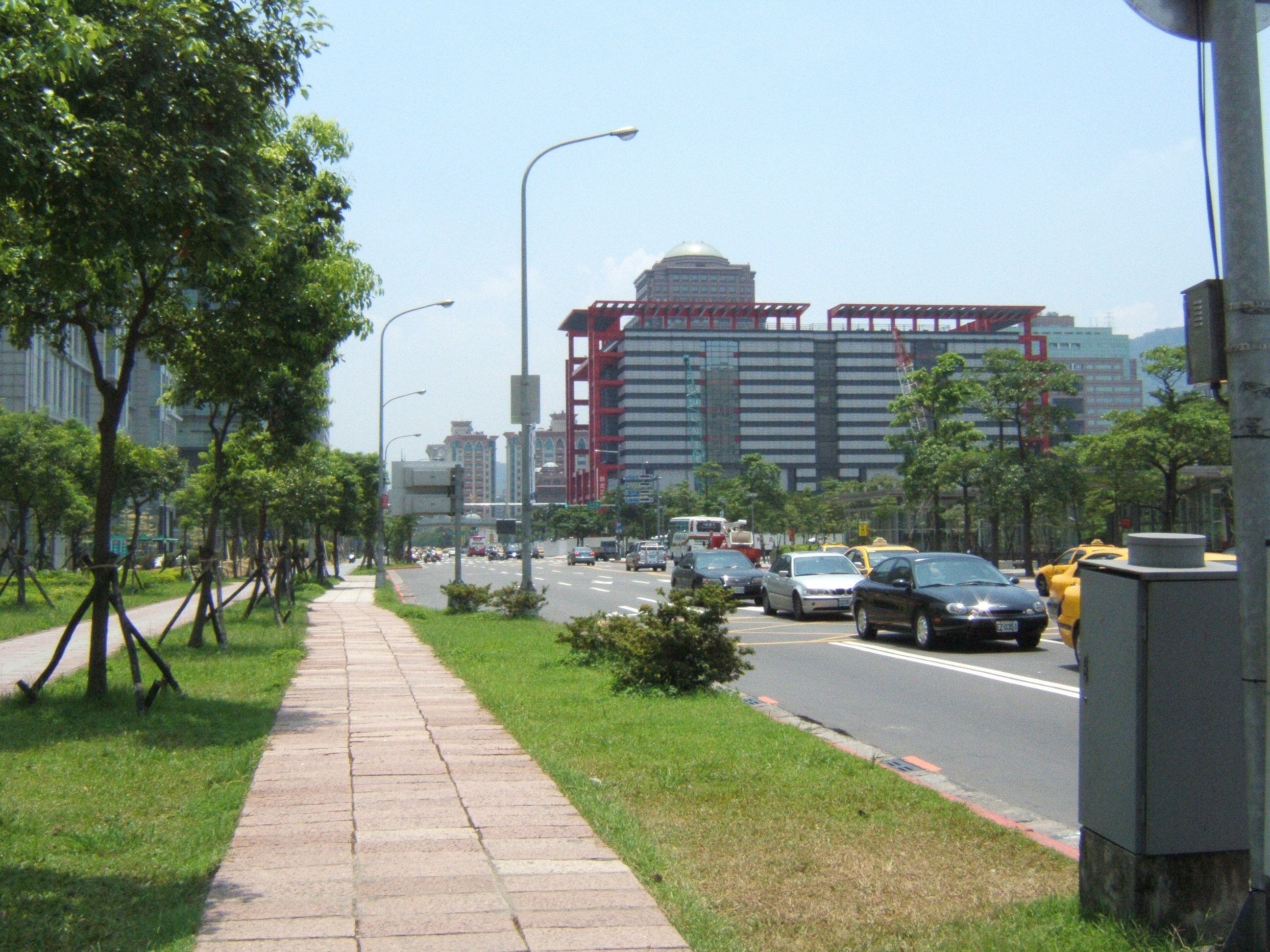
Shin Kong Mitsukoshi shopping complex

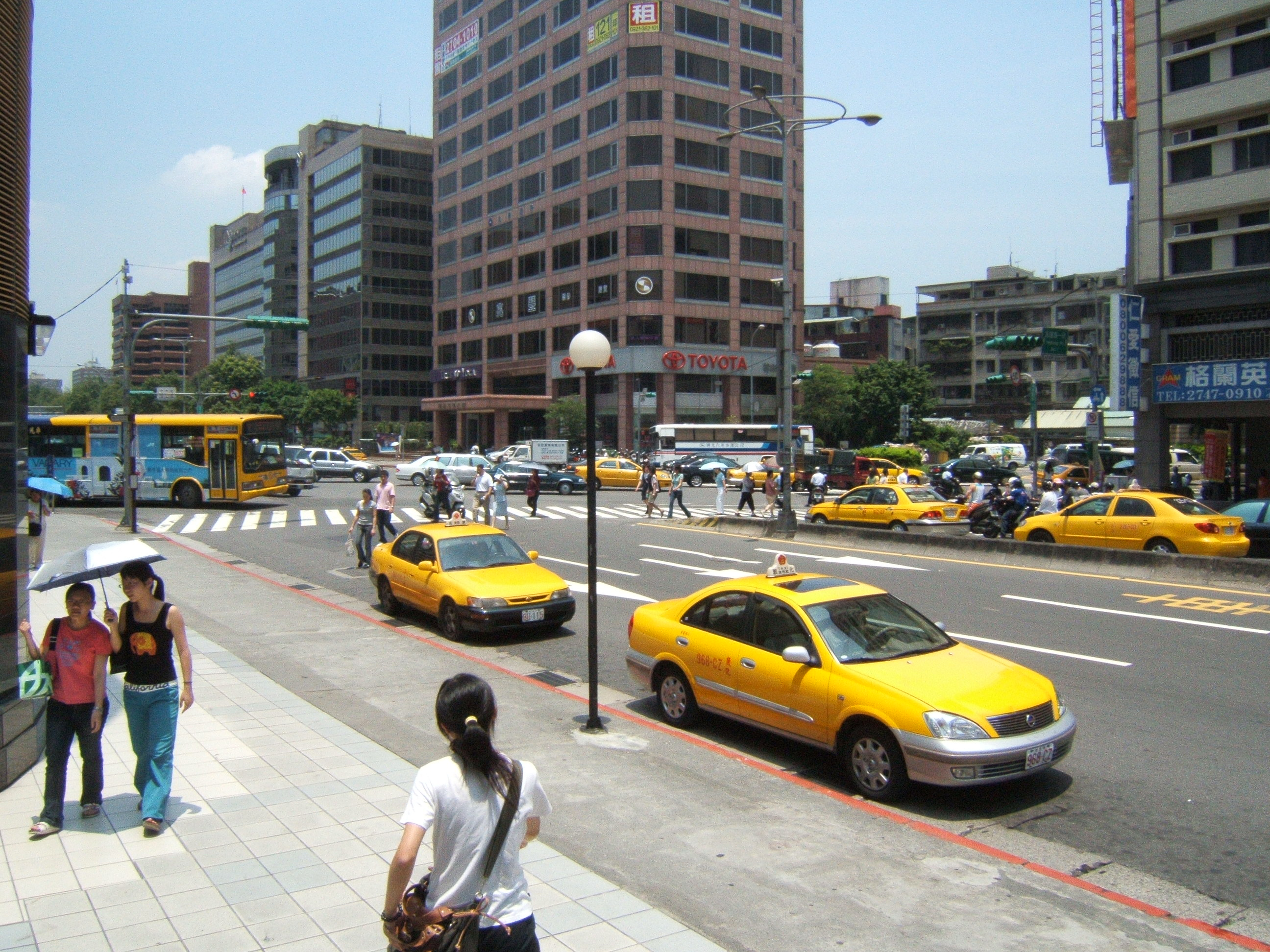
Zhongxiao Rd. and Keelung Rd.

== See also ==
- Taipei
