= Guangfu Road =

Road in Taipei, Taiwan

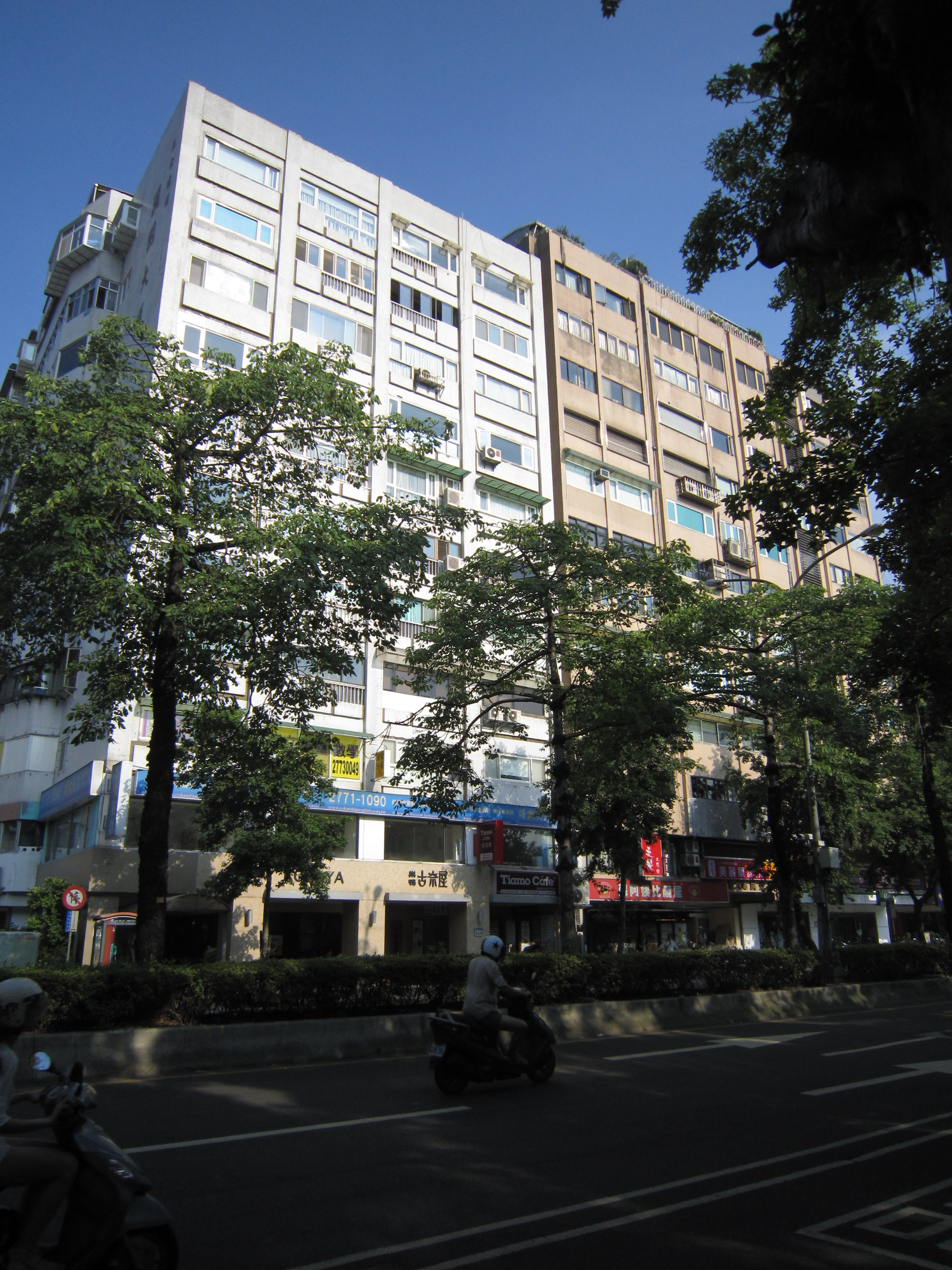
- Native name: 光復路 (Chinese)
- Location: Taipei, Taiwan

Guangfu Road (or Kuang-fu; Chinese: 光復路, meaning "recover") is a major arterial road in Taipei, Taiwan, connecting Songshan Airport in the Songshan district in the north with Keelung Road in the Xinyi district in the south.

The road travels through mostly residential areas with very few retail complexes. Despite this, Guangfu Road is very congested, especially during rush hour.

Notable landmarks along Guangfu Road include:

- Songshan Airport
- Tri-Service General Hospital Songshan Branch
- Songshan Cultural and Creative Park
- Taipei Dome
- National Sun Yat-sen Memorial Hall

== Sections ==
Unlike other arterials in Taipei, Guangfu Road is only divided into directional sections with no smaller numbered sections.

- North section: Minquan East Road Sec. 4 – Bade Road Sec. 3-4
- South section: Bade Road Sec. 3-4 – Keelung Road Sec. 2

== Major intersections ==
=== Guangfu North Road ===
- Minquan East Road Sec. 4
- Minsheng East Road Sec. 4-5
- Jiankang Road
- Nanjing East Road Sec. 5
- Bade Road Sec. 3-4

=== Guangfu South Road ===
- Bade Road Sec. 3-4
- Civic Boulevard Sec. 4-5
- Zhongxiao East Road Sec. 4
- Renai Road Sec. 4
- Xinyi Road Sec. 4
- Keelung Road Sec. 2

== See also ==
- List of roads in Taiwan
