= Minsheng Road =

Road in Taipei, Taiwan

Coordinates: 25.0574°N 121.5188°E

- 8th Boulevard
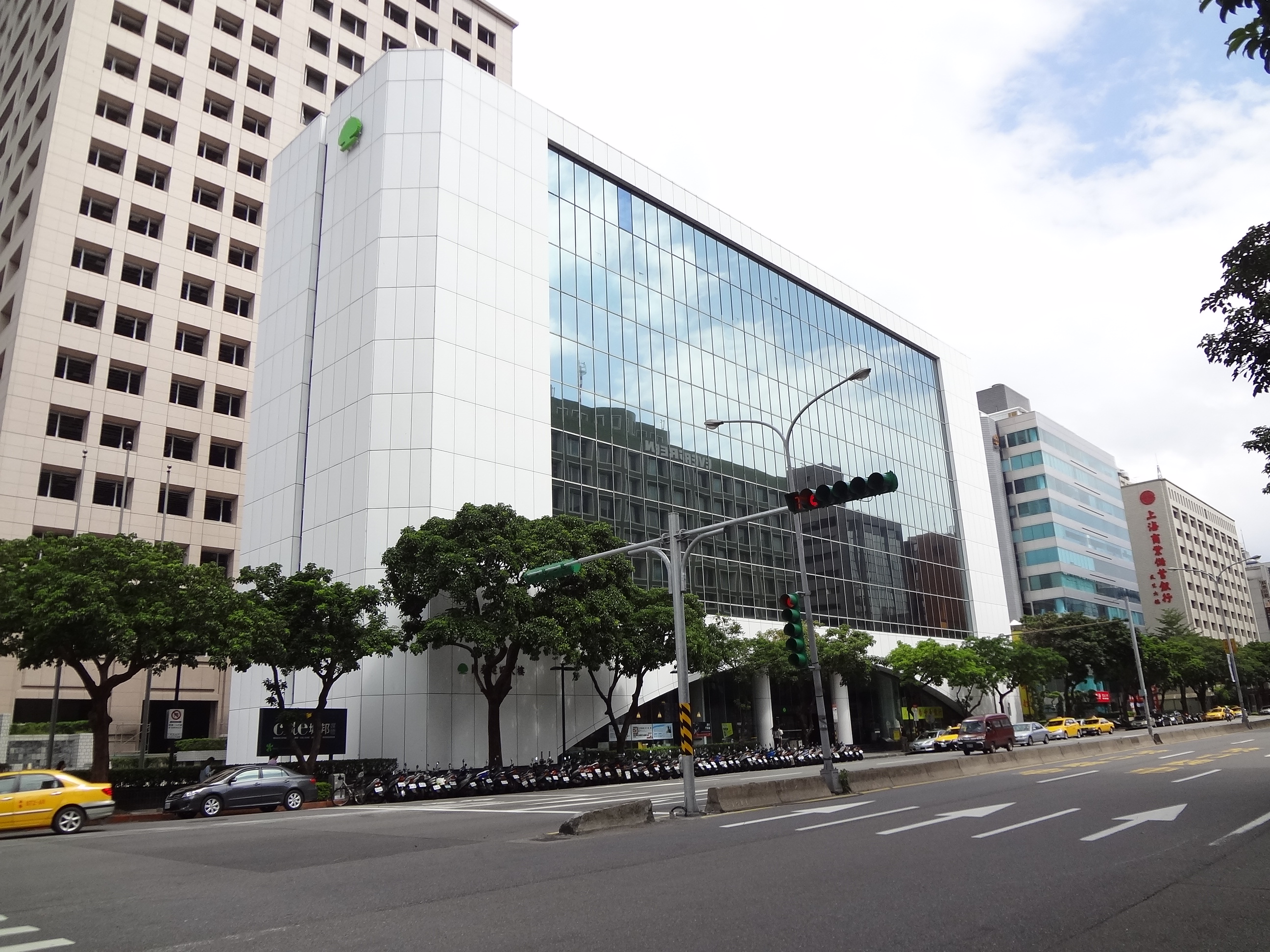
- Interactive map of Minsheng Road
- Native name: 民生路 (Chinese)
- Type: Arterial road
- Location: Taipei, Taiwan

Minsheng Road (Chinese: 民生路; pinyin: Mínshēng Lù) is an east–west 4-lane to 10-lane arterial in Taipei, Taiwan, connecting the Songshan District and Datong District of Taipei City. Minsheng Road is divided into east and west sections, with five smaller sections in the east section and only one is the west section.

== Landmarks ==
Notable landmarks along Minsheng Road include:

- Former residence of Chao Cheng-ming
- Evergreen Marine Corp.
- Mackay Memorial Hospital
- National Taipei University

== Major Intersections ==
=== Minsheng West Road ===
- Huanhe North Road expressway
- Chongging North Road
- Chengde Road
- Zhongshan North Road

=== Minsheng East Road ===
- Xinsheng Road/Expressway
- Songjiang Road
- Jianguo Road/Expressway
- Fuxing North Road
- Dunhua North Road
- Guangfu North Road
- Sanmin Road (large signalized roundabout)
- Tayou Road

== See also ==
- List of roads in Taiwan
