= Dexing Coal Mine =

Former mine in Xinyi, Taipei, Taiwan

Dexing Coal Mine 德興煤礦
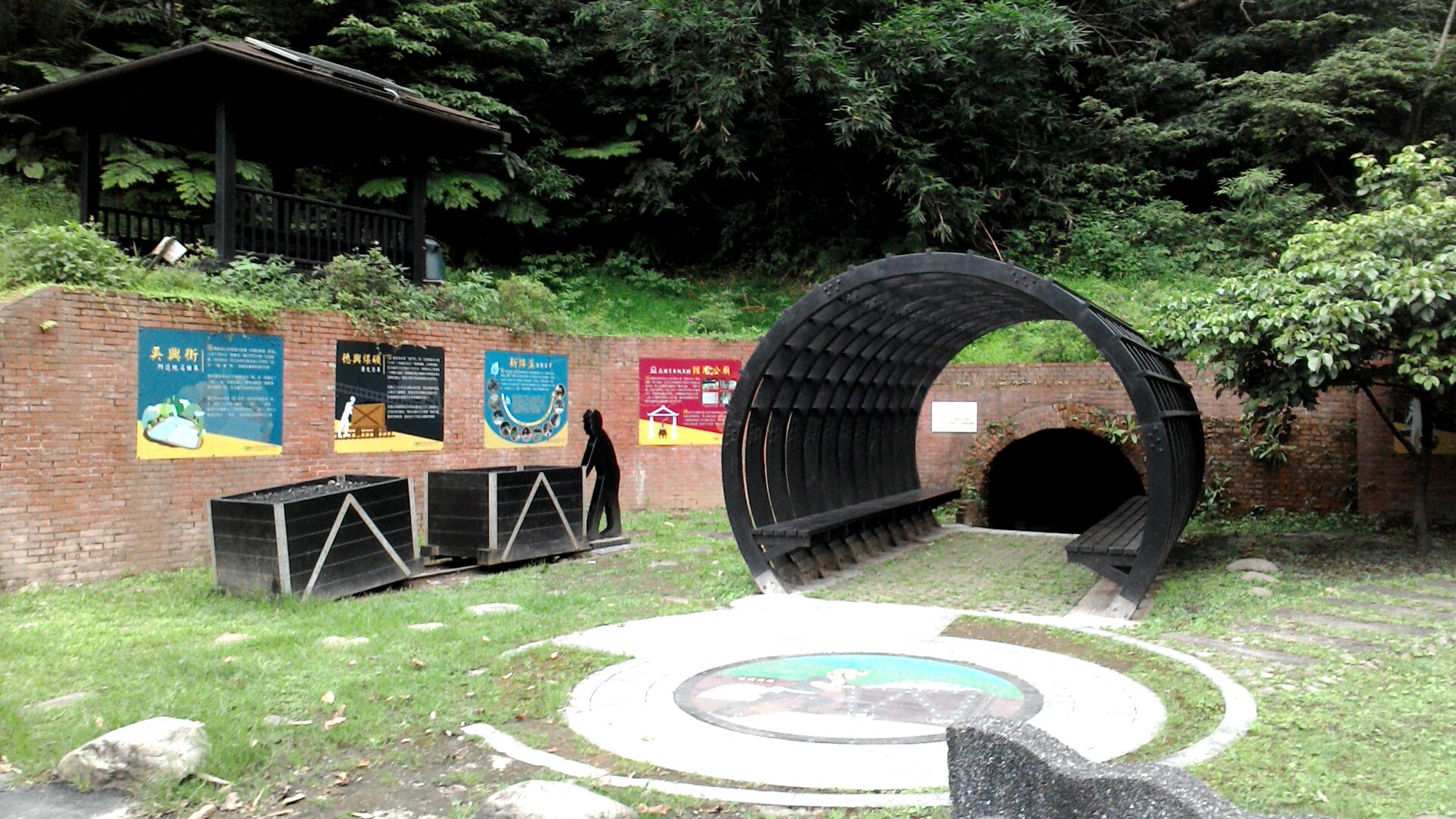

- Taiwan
- Location: Xinyi, Taipei, Taiwan; 25°00′55.2″N 121°34′22.6″E
- Type: Former coal mine
- Opened: 1897

The Dexing Coal Mine (traditional Chinese: 德興煤礦; simplified Chinese: 德兴煤矿; pinyin: Déxìng Méikuàng) is a former coal mine in Xinyi District, Taipei, Taiwan.

== History ==
The mine started its coal mining operation in 1897. Cart lines were built linking the mine area for its distribution. From there, coal was further transported by railway to other locations around Taiwan.

Its production peaked in 1946–1948. In 1980s, the mining became unsustainable due to recession and the rise of direct labor cost working at the site. In December 2015, the former coal mine was partially reopened as a tourist attraction.

== See also ==
- Mining in Taiwan
