= Civic Boulevard =

Highway in Taipei

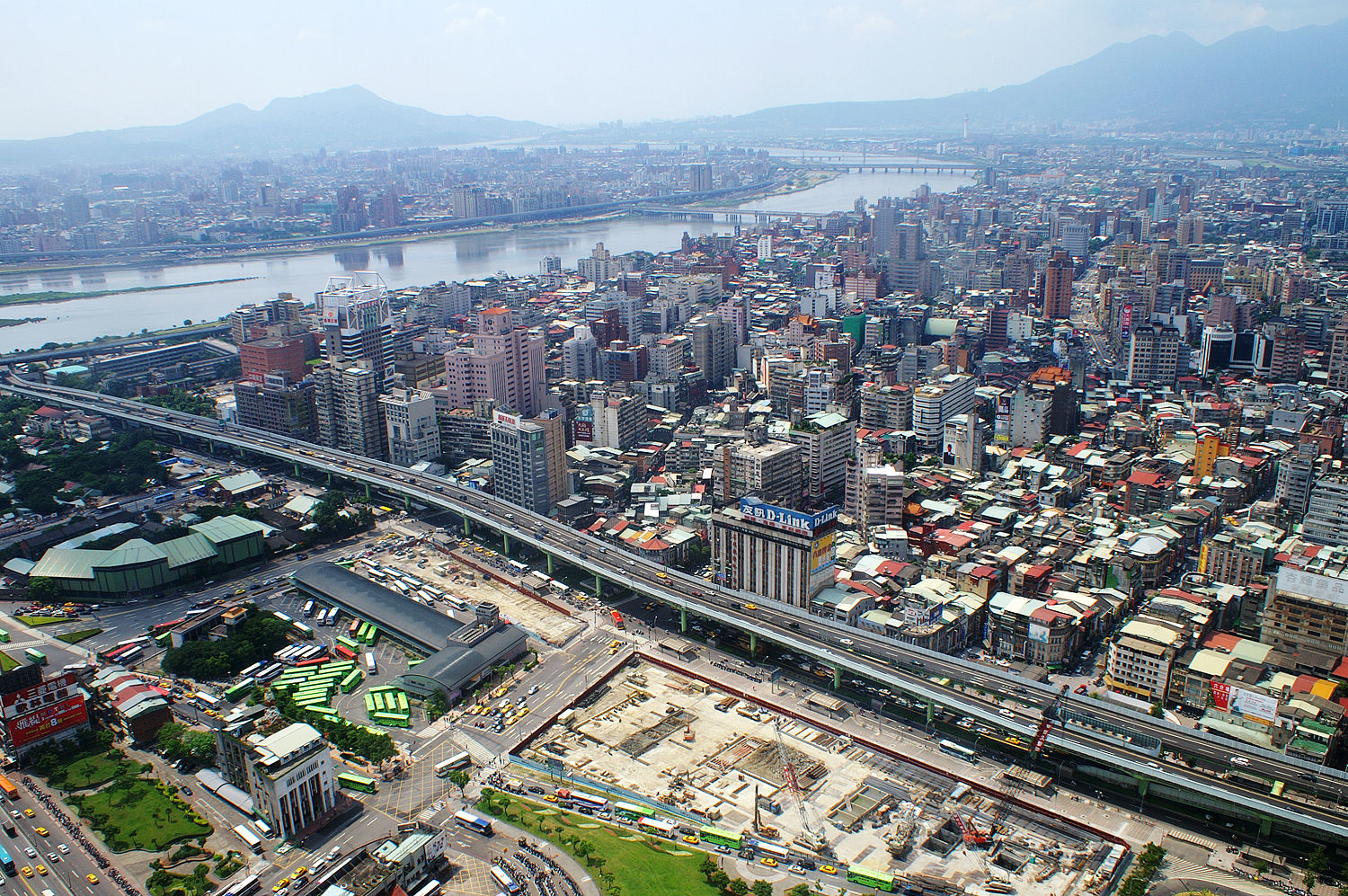
- Native name: 市民大道 (Chinese)
- Type: Highway
- Location: Taipei, Taiwan

Construction
- Completion: 1997

Civic Boulevard
- Chinese: 市民大道
Transcriptions
Standard Mandarin
- Hanyu Pinyin: Shìmín Dàdào
- Bopomofo: ㄕˋ ㄇㄧㄣˊ ㄉㄚˋ ㄉㄠˋ
Southern Min
- Hokkien POJ: Chhǐ-bîn Tāi-tō͘

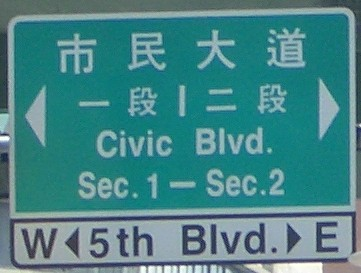
Road name sign in Civic Boulevard

Civic Boulevard (Chinese: 市民大道) is a major highway located in Taipei, Taiwan. It was completed in 1997 as part of a multi-modal reconstruction project to improve transportation networks in congested central Taipei. It consists of a four- to six-lane elevated expressway and a surface-level frontage road system below the highway.

The highway begins at the MacArthur Bridges in the east (connecting the Neihu district, and Keelung Road (in the Xinyi and Songshan districts), heads west, ending at an interchange with the Zhongxiao Bridge and the Huanhe Expressway. It provides direct access to Taipei Main Station, which is just south of Civic Boulevard.

As part of a larger project to move Taiwan railway tracks underground to reduce congestion at surface railroad crossings, Civic Boulevard was built in the old railroad right-of-way, providing a new east-west highway through Taipei. Other parts of this project included underground parking, underground shopping malls in the vicinity of Taipei Main Station, provisions for utilities, and Taiwan High Speed Rail railroad tracks under conventional railroad tracks to Nangang.

== Major interchanges ==
- Zhongxiao Bridge / Huanhe Expressway — half-interchange with surface arterial and direct-flyover ramps to Zhongxiao Bridge and Huanhe Expressway
- Chongqing N. Road — half-interchange
  - Provides access to Taipei Main Station
- Xinsheng S. Road (signed eastbound) / Jianguo S. Road (signed westbound) — full interchange
  - Provides access to Xinsheng Road, Jinshan Road, Songjiang Road, Bade Road, and Jianguo Road
- Guangfu S. Road — half-interchange
- Keelung Road — ramps to surface arterial (to Xinyi and Songshan) and direct-flyover ramps to MacArthur Bridges (to Neihu)

== See also ==
- List of roads in Taiwan
