= Keelung Road =

Road in Taipei, Taiwan

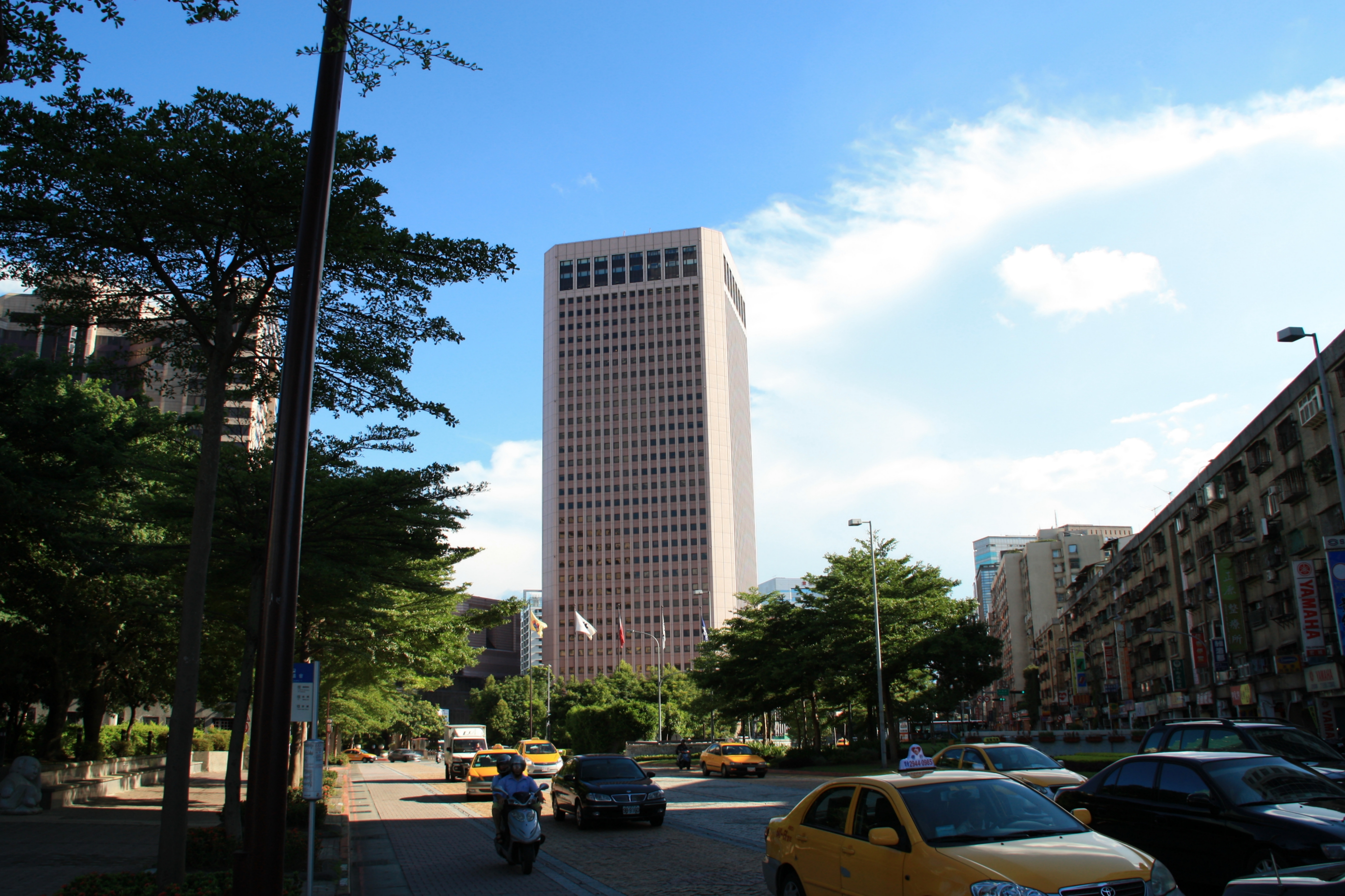
Keelung Road

Keelung Road (Chinese: 基隆路; pinyin: Jīlóng Lù is a major arterial road and highway in Taipei, Taiwan, named for Keelung. It connects the Neihu district from the MacArthur 1st Bridge in the east with the Songshan, Xinyi, and Daan districts towards the southwest, with a connection to Yonghe City via the Fuhe Bridge.

Keelung Road is a very congested route because of its connections to and from Huandong Boulevard, Tiding Boulevard, Civic Boulevard, Xinhai Road/National Freeway 3A, Shuiyuan Expressway, and the Fuhe Bridge, which are all major transportation corridors. There are a series of reversible lanes and bypasses (above ground and underground) along the corridor to provide traffic relief within the small right-of-way.

== Landmarks ==
Notable landmarks along Keelung Road include:

- National Taiwan University
- National Taiwan University Hospital Gongguan Branch
- Linjiang Street Night Market
- Taipei International Convention Center
- Taipei World Trade Center
- Taipei City Council

== Sections ==
Unlike most of Taipei arterials, Keelung Road is not divided into any directional sections. However, there are still numbered sections of the road.

- Section 1: MacAuthur 1st Bridge – Xinyi Road
- Section 2: Xinyi Road – Dunhua S. Road
- Section 3: Dunhua S. Road – Changxing Street
- Section 4: Changxing Street – Shuiyuan Expressway

== Major Intersections ==
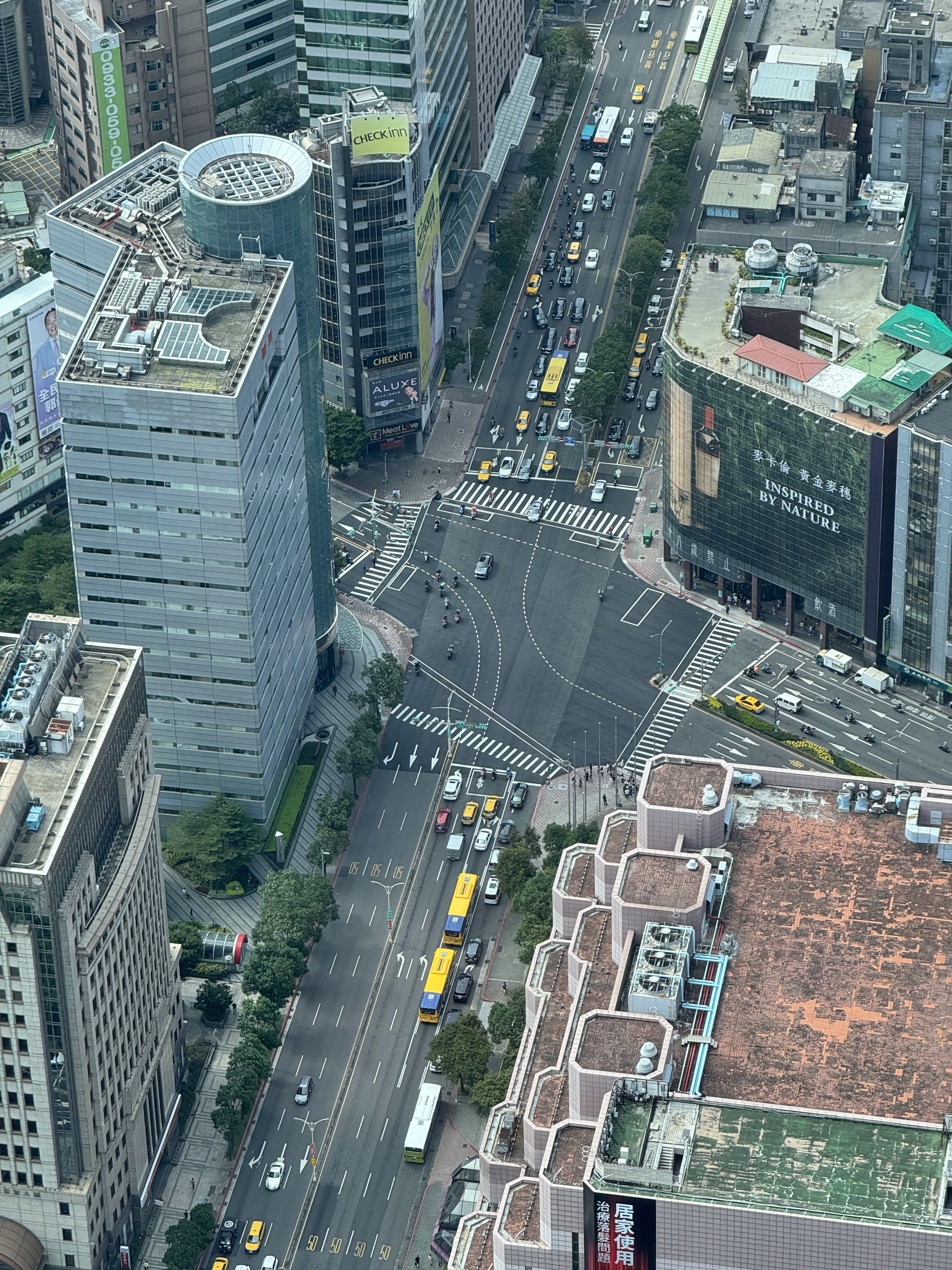
Keelung Road and Xinyi Road Sec. 4-5 Intersection

- Tayou Road & Nanjing Road (surface road only)
- Tiding Boulevard/MacArthur 1st & 2nd bridges (highway only)
- Bade Road Sec. 4 & Civic Boulevard Sec. 5 (surface road only)
- Civic Boulevard expressway (highway only)
- Yongji Road & Dongxing Road (surface road only)
- Songlong Road
- Zhongxiao East Road Sec. 4-5
- Shifu Road (southbound off-ramp and northbound on-ramp only)
- Songshou Road (diamond interchange)
- Xinyi Road Sec. 4-5
- Guangfu South Road
- Heping East Road Sec. 3
- Dunhua South Road Sec. 2 (surface road only)
- Xinhai Road Sec. 2-3 (surface road only)
- Roosevelt Road Sec. 4-5 (surface road only)
- Shuiyuan Expressway

== See also ==
- List of roads in Taiwan
