= Zhongxiao Road =

Road in Taipei, Taiwan

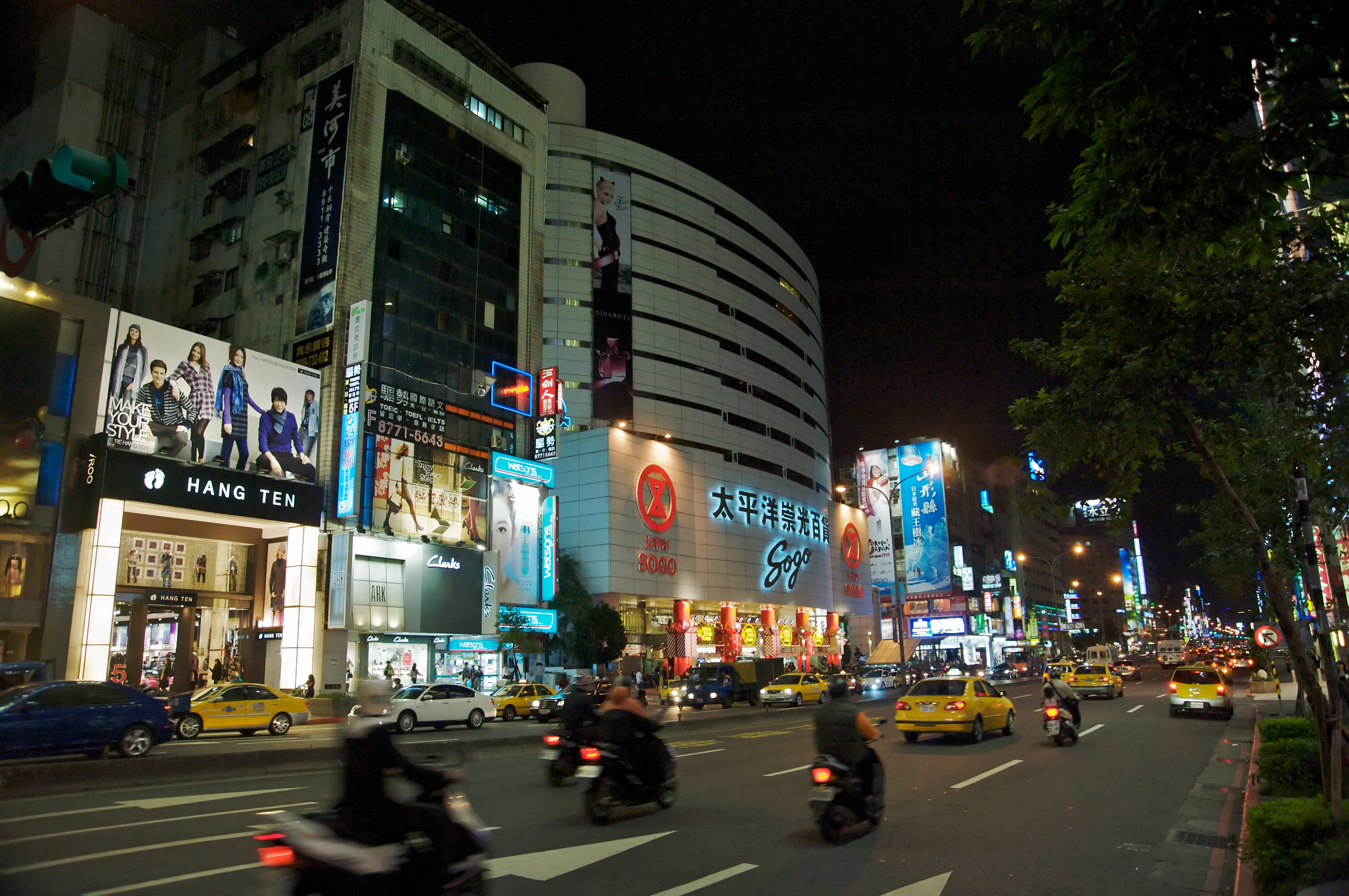
Zhongxiao East Road

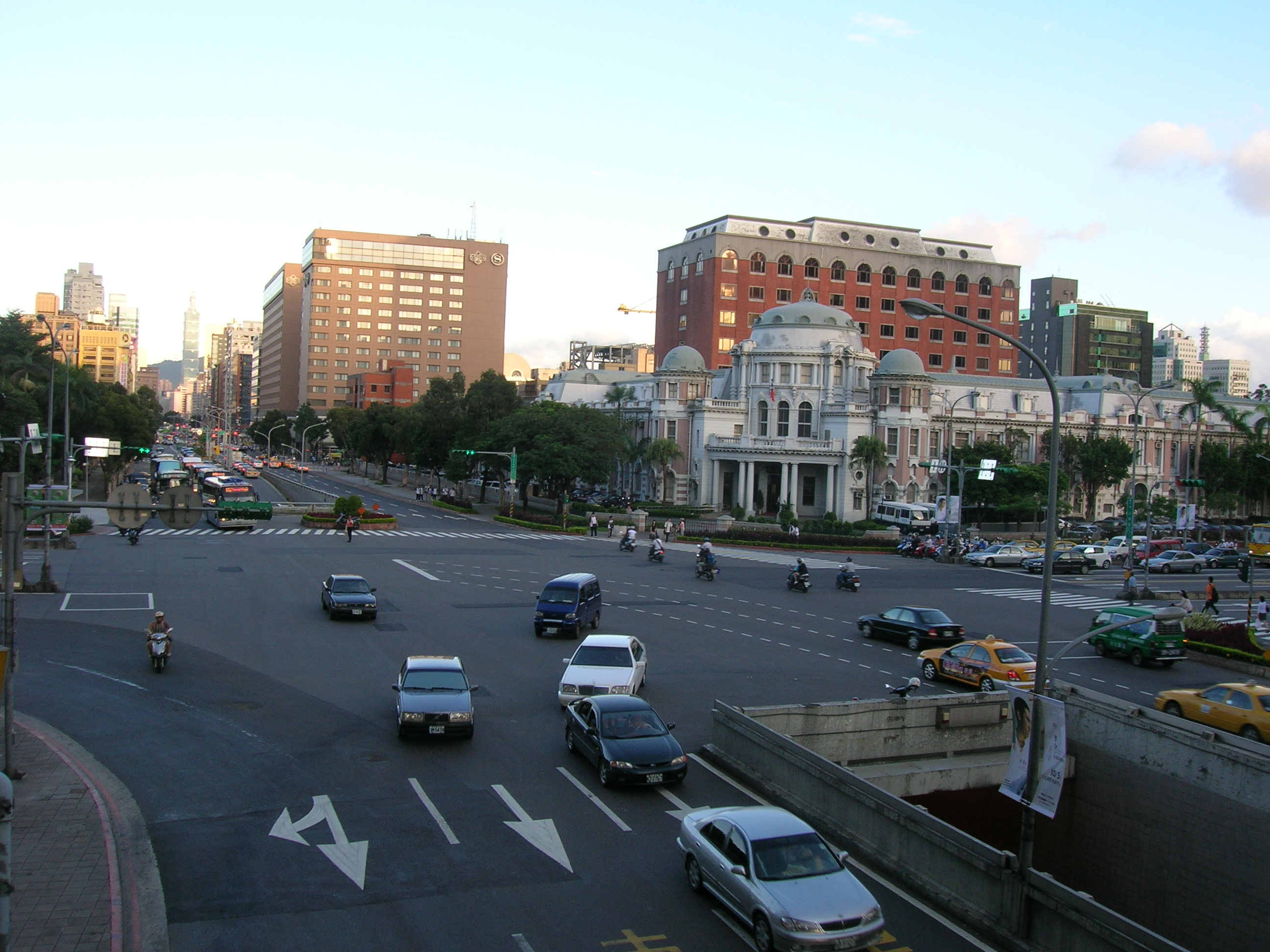
Zhongxiao West Road

Zhongxiao Road (Chinese: 忠孝東路、忠孝西路, sometimes spelled Chunghsiao Road) is a major arterial road that is part of Provincial Highway 5 in Taipei, Taiwan, connecting the Zhongzheng District in the west with the Daan, Songshan, Xinyi, and Nangang districts in the east.

Zhongxiao Road is known as a popular shopping and entertainment area, with many large department stores and shopping malls located along most of the entire stretch.

About half of the Bannan line of the Taipei Metro runs under the road, with stations located at major intersections along the road, which accounts for the significant pedestrian traffic along the road.

The majority of the road is 8–10 lanes wide with a median dividing the road. At the intersection with Zhongshan Road, there is a two-lane underpass for traffic on Zhongxiao Road to bypass the intersection.

Notable landmarks along Zhongxiao Road include:

- Taipei North Gate, originally one of the gates of the Walls of Taipei
- Taipei Main Station
- Shin Kong Life Tower
- Control Yuan
- Executive Yuan
- Shandao Temple
- National Taipei University of Technology
- Sun Yat-sen Memorial Hall

== History ==
Zhongxiao Road west of Bade Road used be known as Zhongzheng Road, named after Chiang Kai-shek. It got its current name in 1970, after Zhongxiao Road was extended into eastern Taipei.

== Sections ==
Zhongxiao Road is divided into east and west sections, as determined by Zhongshan Road, with two numbered sections in the west section and seven numbered sections in the east.

=== Zhongxiao West Road ===
- Section 1: Zhongshan Road – Zhonghua Road
- Section 2: Zhonghua Road – Huanhe Road/Zhongxiao Bridge (to Sanchong District)

=== Zhongxiao East Road ===
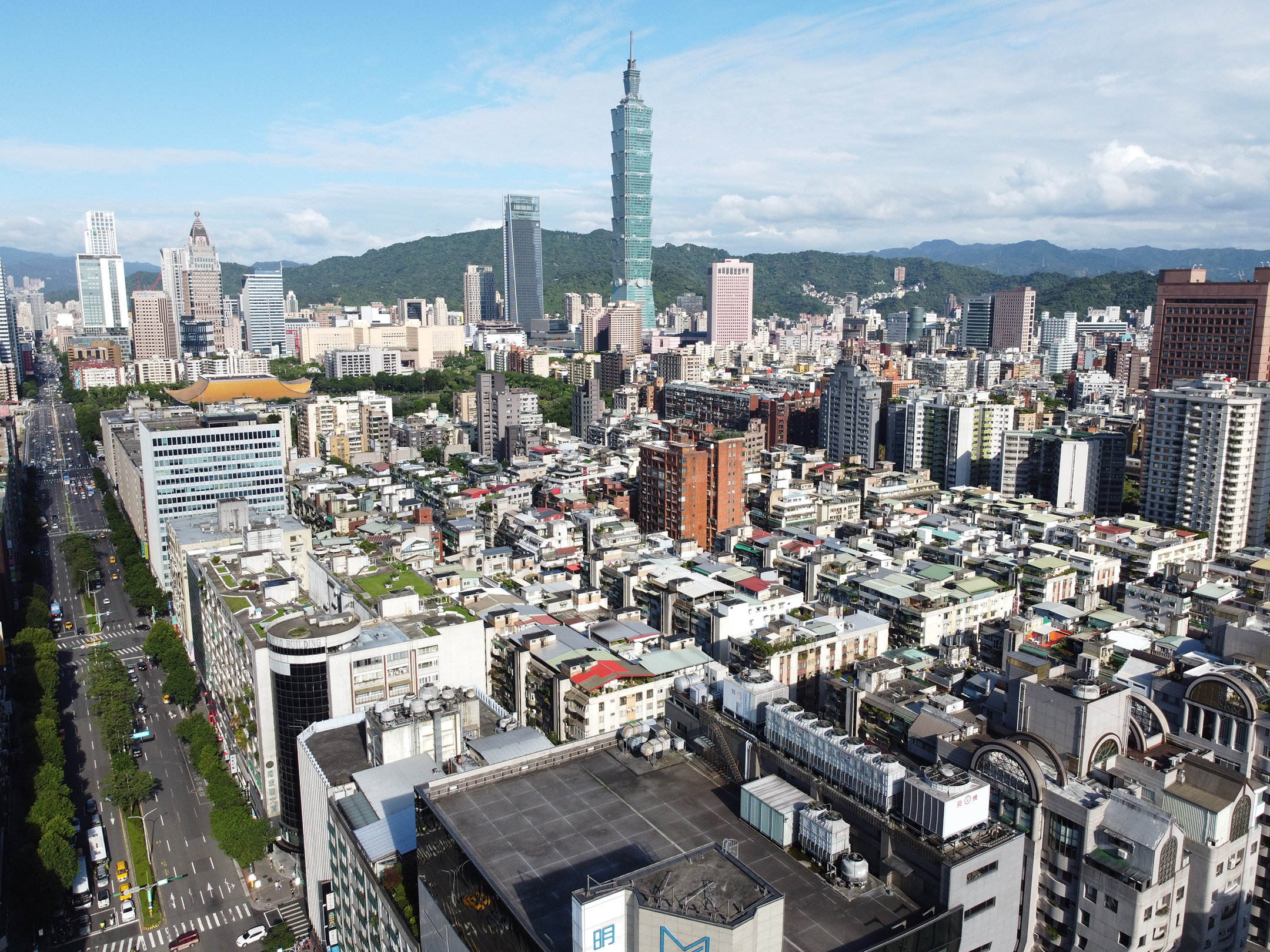
Skyline of Taipei viewed from Section 4, Zhongxiao East Road

- Section 1: Zhongshan Road – Hangzhou Road
- Section 2: Hangzhou Road – Xinsheng Road
- Section 3: Xinsheng Road – Fuxing Road
- Section 4: Fuxing Road – Keelung Road
- Section 5: Keelung Road – Yongji Road
- Section 6: Yongji Road – Shiangyang Road
- Section 7: Shiangyang Road – Academia Road

== Major intersections ==
=== Zhongxiao West Road ===
- Zhongshan Road
- Gongyuan Road
- Chongqing Road
- Boai Road
- Zhonghua Road
- Huanhe Road

=== Zhongxiao East Road ===
- Zhongshan Road
- Linsen Road
- Bade Road
- Xinsheng Road/Expressway
- Jianguo Road/Expressway
- Fuxing Road
- Dunhua Road
- Yanji Street
- Guangfu Road
- Keelung Road
- Songshan Road
- Yongji Road
- Dongxin Road
- Shiangyang Road

== In popular culture ==
Zhongxiao E. Road is frequently the theme or mentioned in literature or Taiwanese popular music lyrics or titles.

== See also ==
- List of roads in Taiwan
