= Zhongshan Road (Taipei) =

Major arterial in Taipei, Taiwan

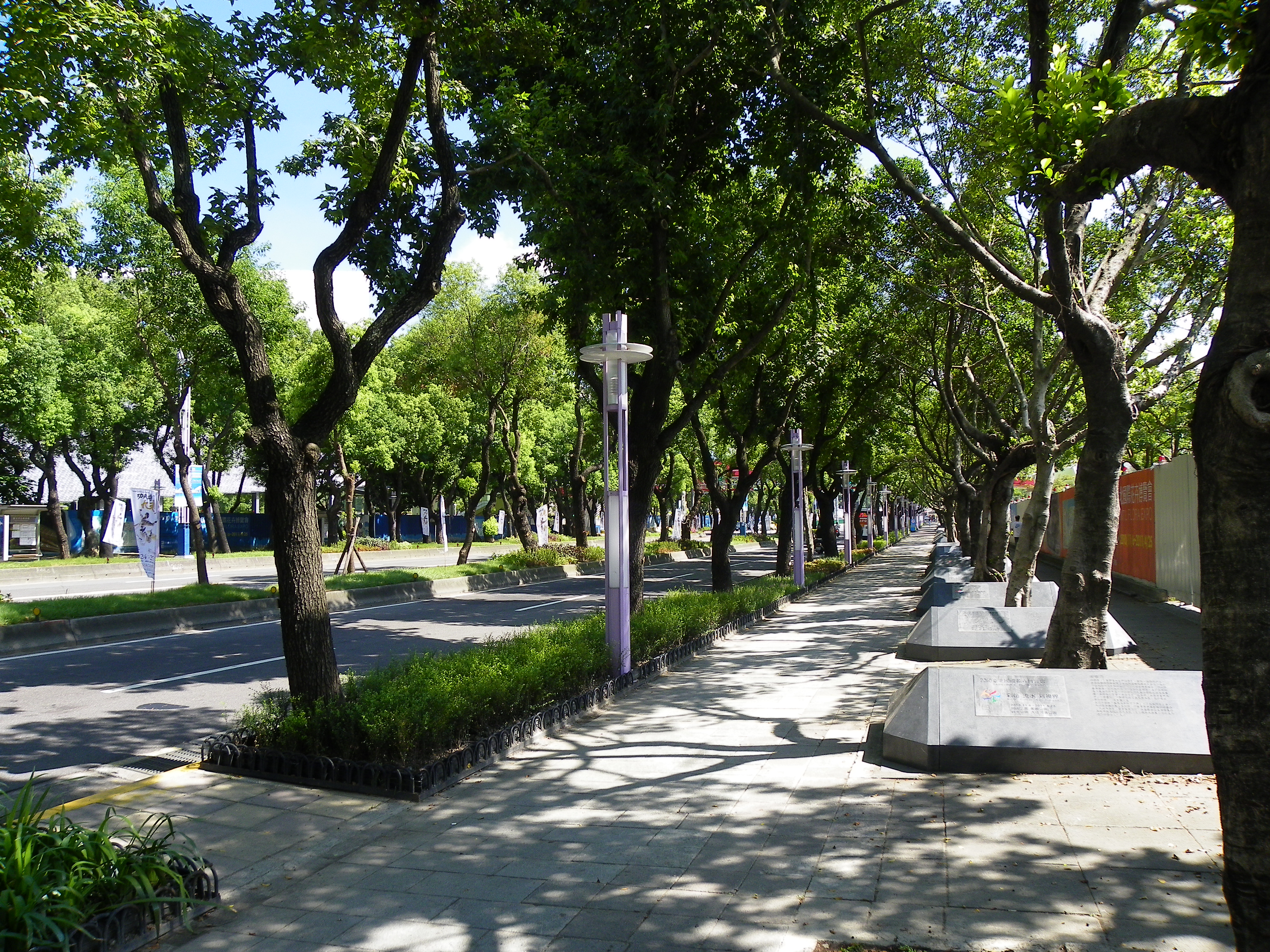
Zhongshan North Road

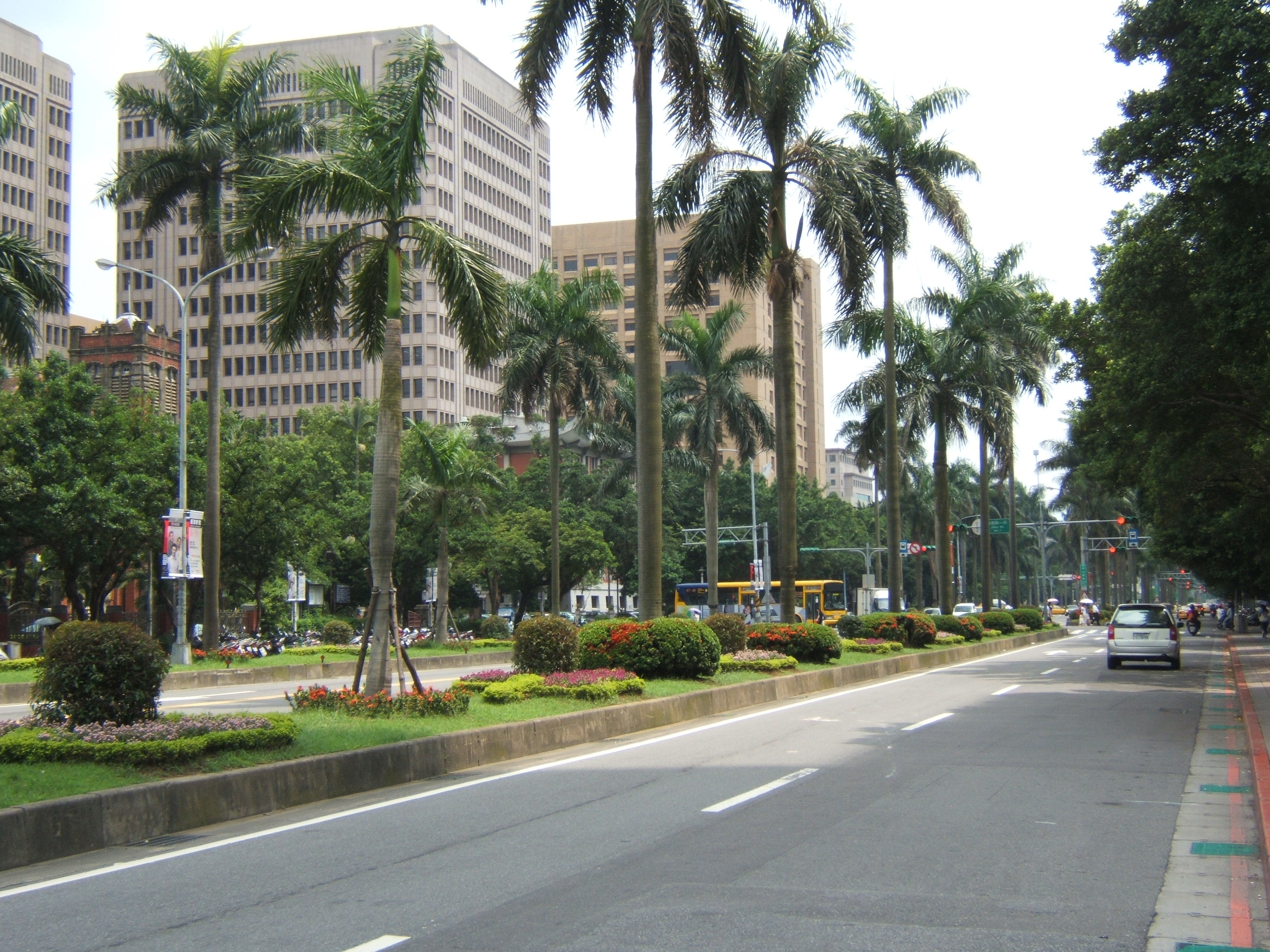
Zhongshan South Road

Zhongshan Road (Chinese: 中山路), named after Sun Yat-sen, is a major arterial road in Taipei, Taiwan, connecting the Zhongzheng District in the south with the Datong, Shilin and Beitou districts in the north. Throughout the route, it is divided into express and local lanes, with landscaped medians in between.

The road was built during Japanese rule of Taiwan. It was called Chokushi kaidō (Chokushi Avenue) and led to the Taiwan Grand Shrine. Later, it was the commuting route of President Chiang Kai-shek between the Presidential Office Building and his Shilin District residence.

Notable landmarks located along Zhongshan Road includes:

- Chiang Kai-shek Memorial Hall
- Former Kuomintang Headquarters
- National Taiwan University Hospital
- Taipei Main Station
- Executive Yuan
- Judicial Yuan
- Mackay Memorial Hospital
- Taipei Fine Arts Museum
- Grand Hotel
- Shilin Night Market
- Shilin Official Residence
- Tianmu

Zhongshan Road is divided into north and south sections, with the north section lying between Zhongxiao Road and northern Beitou (dead-end), and the south section between Aiguo Road and Roosevelt Road. There are seven sections in the northern part and only one section in the southern part.

In 2007, Taipei replaced the Zhongshan Bridge crossing Keelung River to improve traffic flow at the Beian Road/Xinsheng Expressway interchange.

== Major Intersections ==
=== Zhongshan South Road ===
- Roosevelt Road, Aiguo Road
- Ketagalan Boulevard, Renai Road, Xinyi Road at East Gate

=== Zhongshan North Road ===
- Zhongxiao Road
- Civic Boulevard
- Changan Road
- Nanjing Road
- Minsheng Road
- Minquan Road
- Minzu Road
- Beian Road/Xinsheng Expressway
- Jiantan Road (Jiantan metro station)
- Zhongzheng Road
- Zhongcheng Road
- Dexing Road
- Tianmu Road

== See also ==
- List of roads in Taiwan
- List of streets named after Sun Yat-sen
