= Xinsheng Road =

Road in Taipei, Taiwan

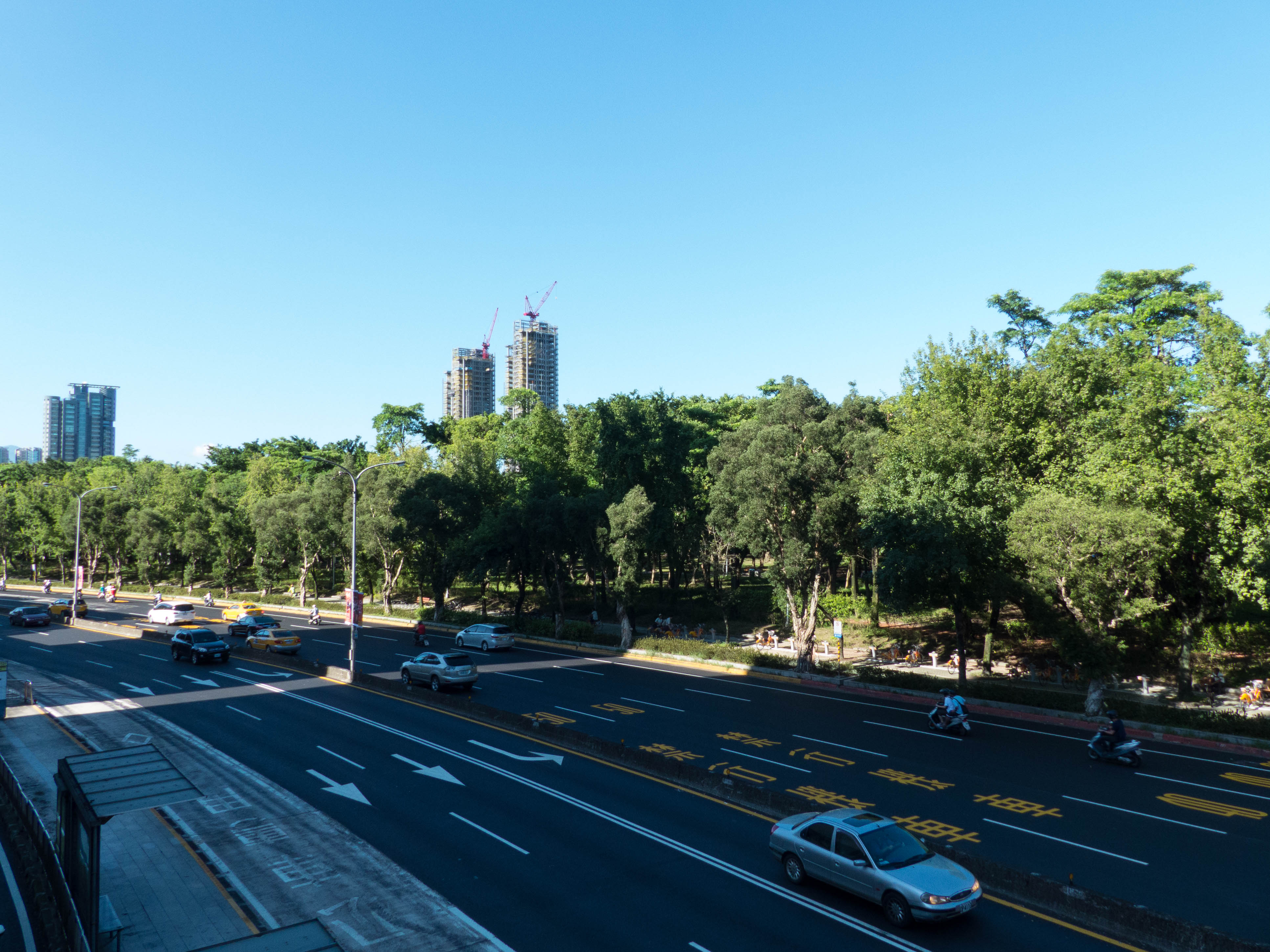
- Native name: 新生路 (Chinese)
- Former name: Horikawa Avenue
- Type: Street
- Location: Taipei, Taiwan

Xinsheng Road (Chinese: 新生路, sometimes spelled Hsinsheng Road) is a major arterial road in Taipei, Taiwan, connecting the Daan District in the south with the Zhongshan and the Shilin districts in the north. Xinsheng Road is mainly a surface arterial, with the exception of the section between Zhongxiao Road and Zhongshan Road, where there is a four-lane expressway running above the surface arterial, which eventually carries the road over the Keelung River north of Minzu Road and onto Zhongshan Road on the other side.

Xinsheng literally means "New Life" and the road is named after the New Life Movement which was established by Chiang Kai-shek and Soong Mei-ling.

The roads were built along both sides of the Horikawa Drainage Channel during Japanese rule and were originally named Horikawa-dōri (Horikawa Avenue).

== Landmarks ==
Notable landmarks along Xinsheng Road include:

- Xinsheng Park
- Xingtian Temple
- Daan Forest Park
- Wistaria Tea House

== Sections ==
=== Xinsheng North Road ===
- Section 1: Civic Boulevard – Nanjing Road
- Section 2: Nanjing Road – Minquan Road
- Section 3: Minquan Road – Zhongshan Road

=== Xinsheng South Road ===
- Section 1: Civic Boulevard – Xinyi Road
- Section 2: Xinyi Road – Heping Road
- Section 3: Heping Road – Roosevelt Road

== Major intersections ==
- Roosevelt Road
- Xinhai Road
- Heping Road
- Xinyi Road
- Renai Road
- Zhongxiao Road
- Bade Road
- Songjiang Road
- Nanjing Road
- Changchung Road
- Minsheng Road
- Minquan Road
- Minzu Road
- Zhongshan Road

== Exit list (expressway) ==
Intersecting Roads	Notes
Jinshan Road	Southern Terminus; BEGIN Expressway
Bade Road, Zhongxiao Road	SB exit, NB entry only
Changan Road
Changchun Road	SB exit only
Minsheng Road	NB exit only
Minquan Road	NB entry only
Minzu Road	No SB exit
Zhongshan Road, Beian Road	Complicated northern terminus

== See also ==
- List of roads in Taiwan
