= Heping Road =

Road in Taipei, Taiwan

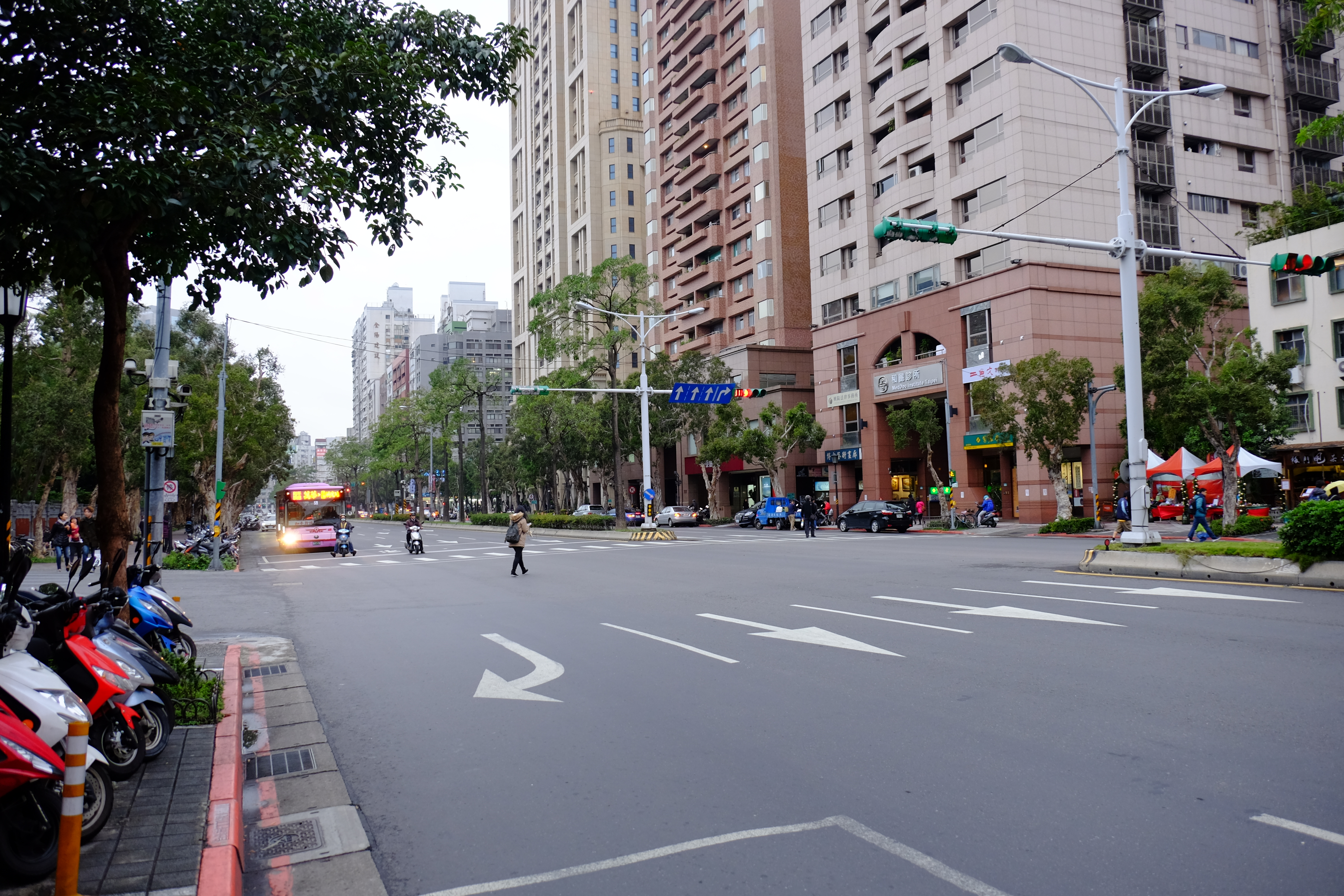
Heping East Road.

Heping Road (Chinese: 和平東路/和平西路) is a major east–west arterial road in Taipei, Taiwan. The road is bisected into the east and west segments by Roosevelt Road, with three numbered sections in the west segment and four in the east. Heping Road connects Wanhua District and Zhongzheng District in its west segment to Daan District, Xinyi District, and Wenshan District in its east segment.

Heping East Road Section 4 in Wenshan was created in 2014 by renaming Jungong Road.

== Attractions ==
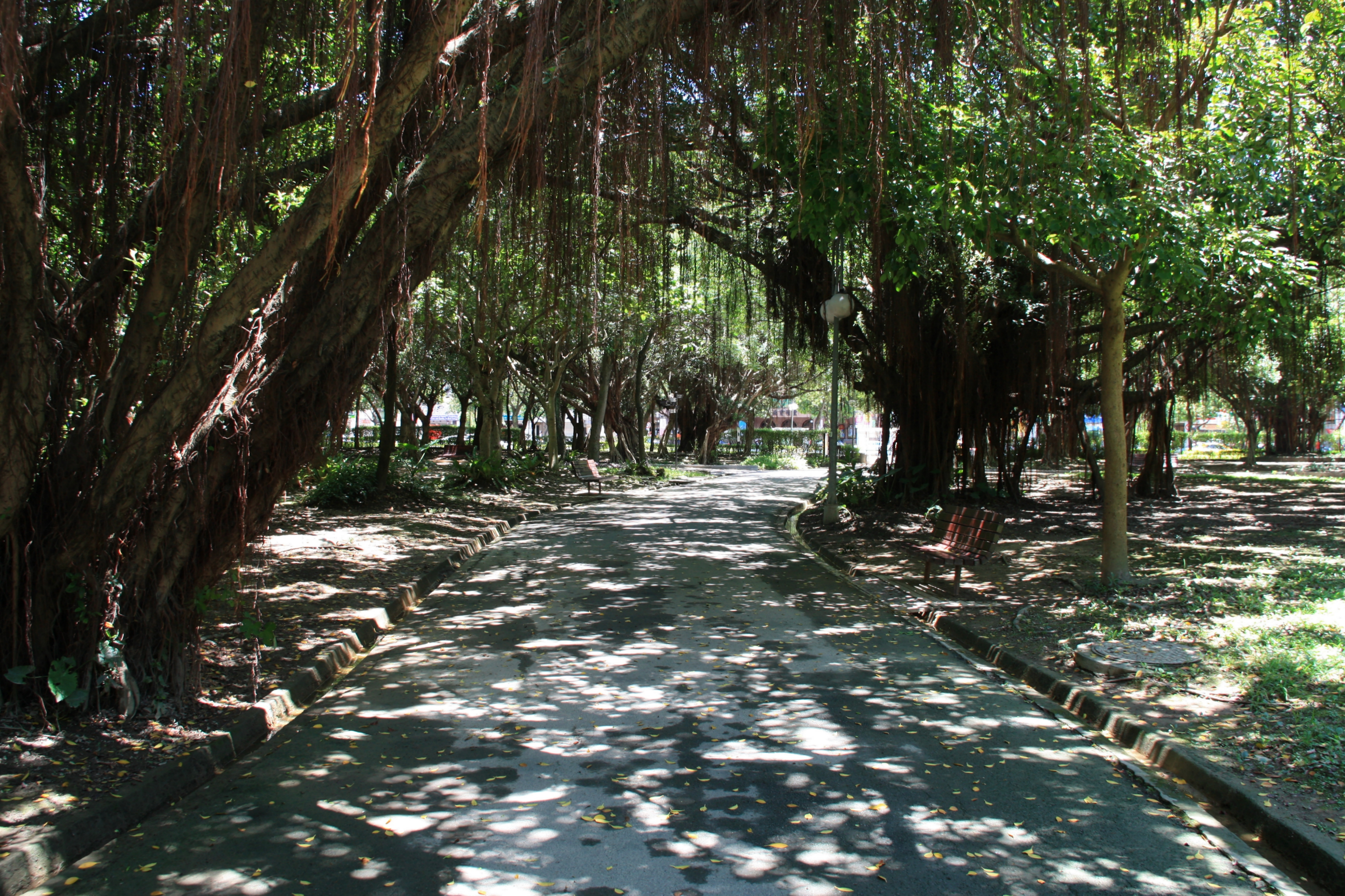
A view from Da'an Forest Park towards its southern end at Heping Road

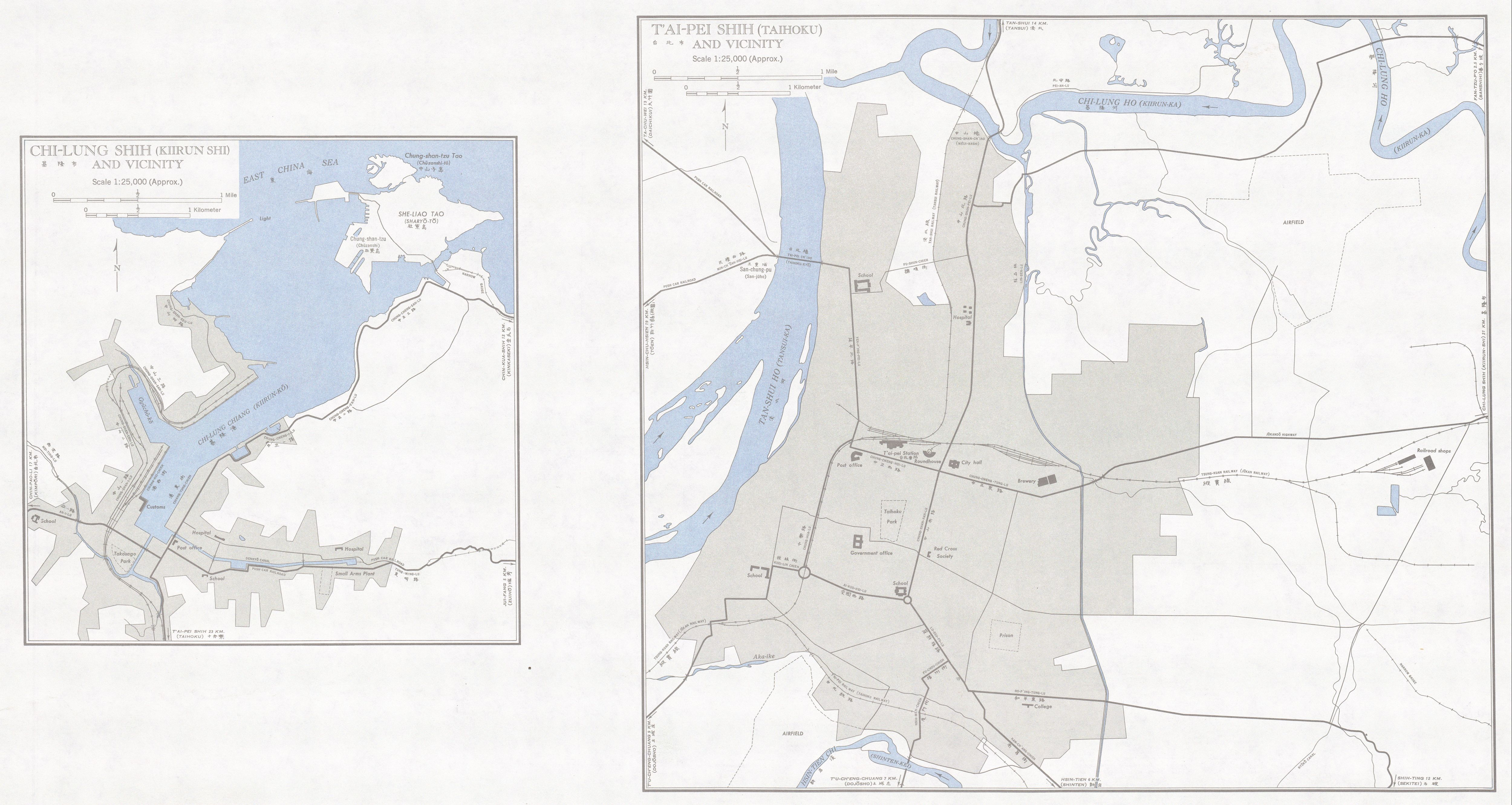
Map including Heping Road (labeled as HO-P’ING-TUNG-LU 和平東路) (1950s)

Notable attractions on Heping Road include:

- Taipei Botanical Garden
- National Taiwan Normal University
- Daan Forest Park
- National Taipei University of Education

== Sections ==
=== Heping West Road ===
- Section 1: Roosevelt Road – Quanzhou Street
- Section 2: Quanzhou Street – Zhonghua Road
- Section 3: Zhonghua Road – terminates at Huajiang Bridge

=== Heping East Road ===
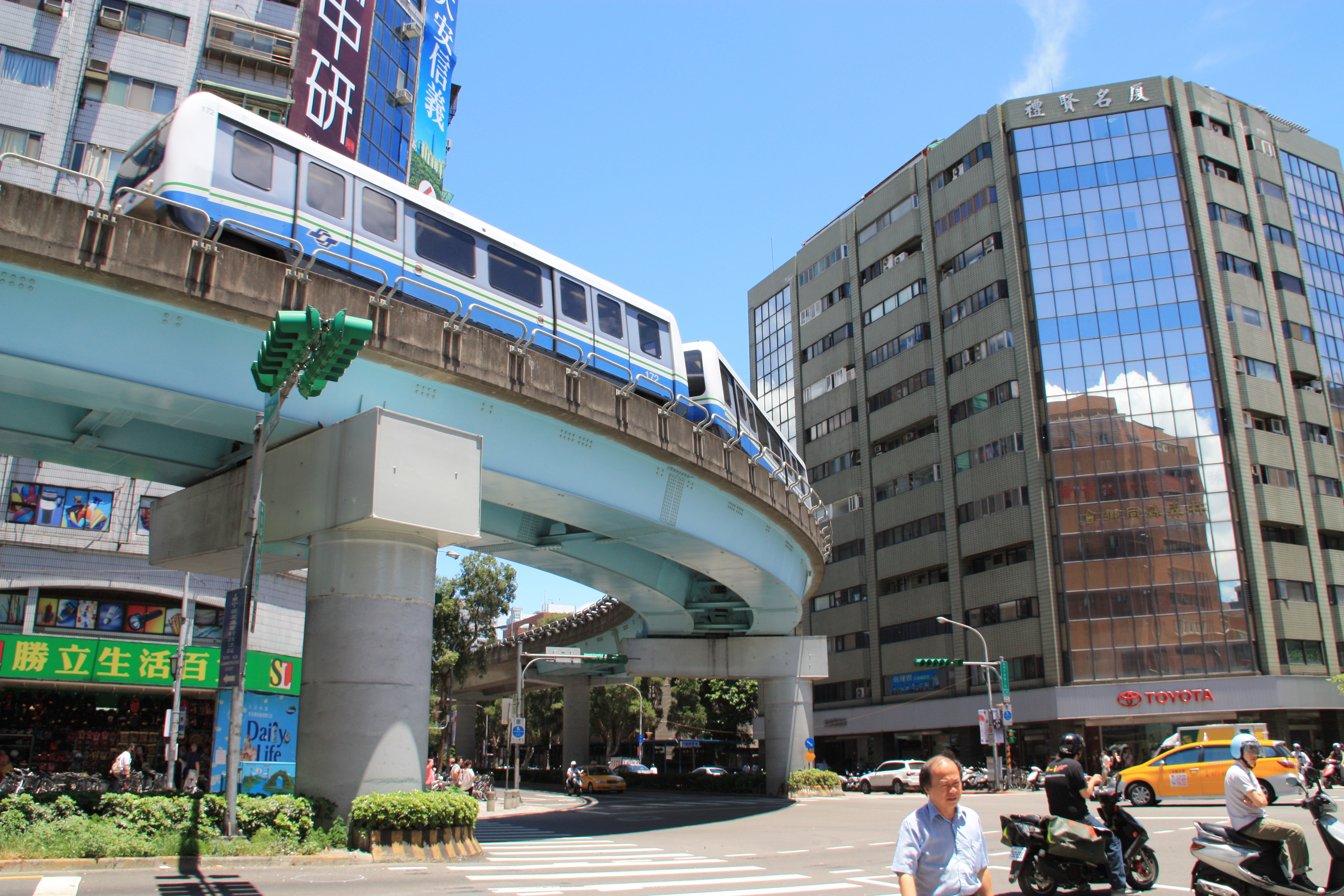
Heping Road intersection with Fuxing Road, showing the Wenshan Line (Taipei Metro) near the Technology Building Station.

- Section 1: Roosevelt Road – Xinsheng Road
- Section 2: Xinsheng Road – Wolong Street
- Section 3: Wolong Street – Zhuangjing Tunnel
- Section 4: Zhuangjing Tunnel – terminates at Muzha Road

== See also ==
- List of roads in Taiwan
