= Hsintien line =

Railway line in Taiwan

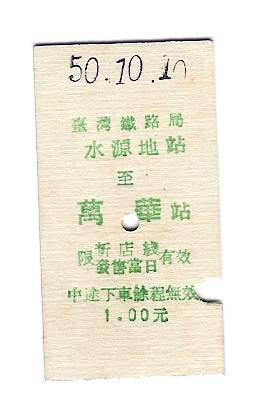
A TRA Hsintien line ticket, issued in 1961

The Hsintien line (Chinese: 新店線; pinyin: Xīndiàn Xiàn; Wade–Giles: Hsin¹-tien⁴ Hsien⁴) was a Taiwanese railroad branch line, located in Taipei City and New Taipei City, operated by the Taiwan Railway Administration (TRA). It connected the city of Taipei with Xindian District in New Taipei.

== History ==
The Hsintien line was 10.4 km long and was opened on 21 January 1921. It originally had 14 stations, but six stations (Sin Kung Temple [Senkōbyō], Seibinkaisha-mae, Nijūchō, Kōgakkō-mae and Bunsan County Hall [located after Hsintien Station]) were abandoned after World War II. Kungkuan Station closed on 1 November 1963, with the entire line being shut down on 24 March 1965. The TRTS Xindian Line currently operates on a route similar to the old TRA Hsintien Line.

Roosevelt Road follows the route of this railway line.

== See also ==
- Tamsui railway line
