= Taipei Water Park =

Water park in Zhongzheng, Taipei, Taiwan

Taipei Water Park 自來水園區
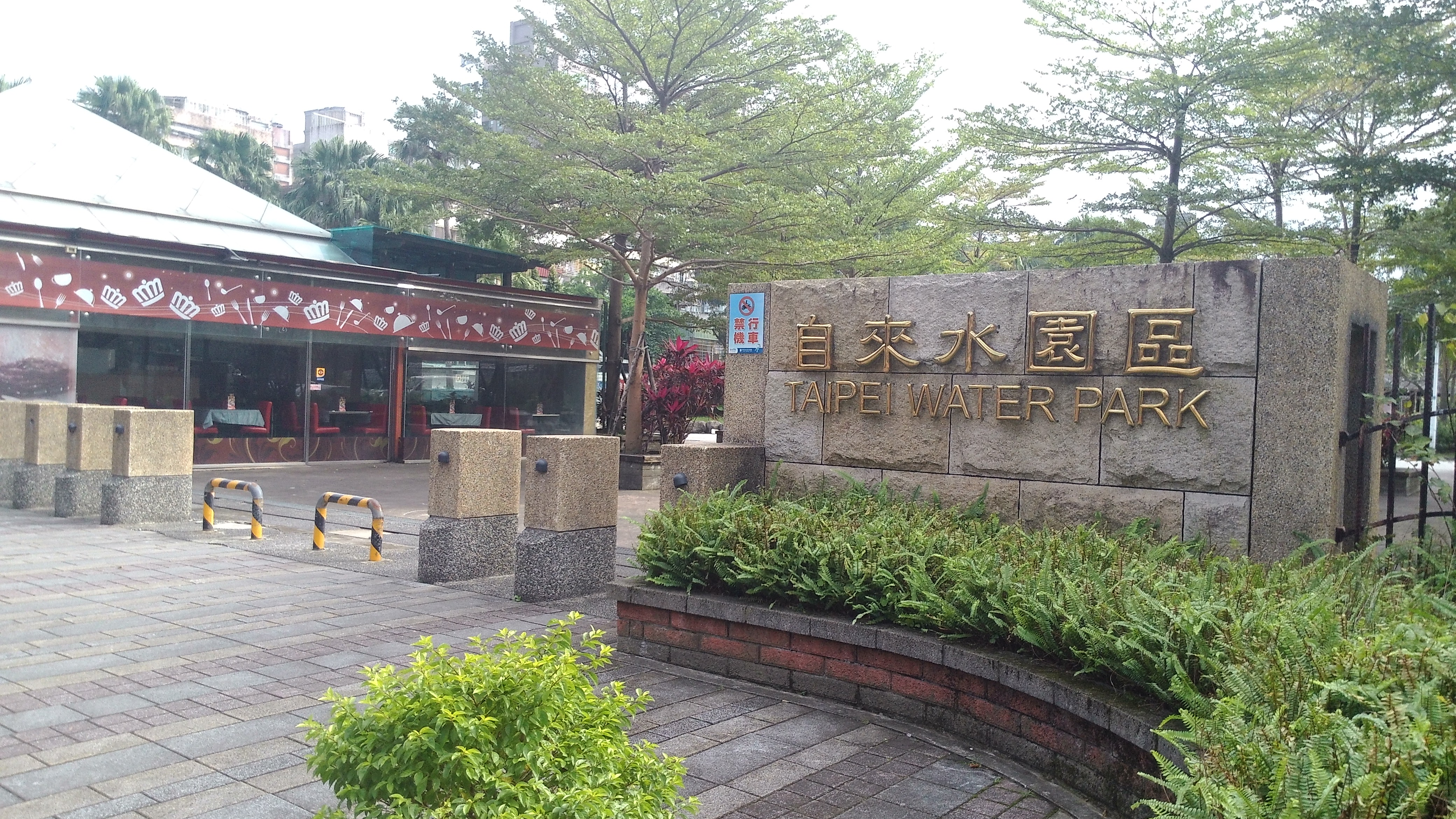
- Interactive map of Taipei Water Park 自來水園區
- Location: Zhongzheng, Taipei, Taiwan
- Coordinates: 25°00′45″N 121°32′00″E
- Opened: 2002
- Website: Official website

Taipei Water Park (traditional Chinese: 自來水園區; simplified Chinese: 自来水园区; pinyin: Zìláishuǐ Yuánqū) is a water park in Zhongzheng District, Taipei, Taiwan.

Taipei Water Park is located next to the Gongguan commercial district in Taipei City. It has various outdoor water attractions, including a spiral water slide, a family water slide, a lazy river, a children's wading pool, and a fountain forest.

Every year, since 2004, the Taipei Water Festival takes place at Taipei Water Park in early July, and it lasts until late August. It tends to attract 100,000-150,000 attendees per year. In Summer, 2026, the theme was "Two Water Attractions, One Summer". The Water Country Park and Water Adventure Park areas are open annually in the Summer months of July and August, and are closed on Mondays.

Taipei Water Park also has a special program during the Christmas season, in winter. From late November through New Year's Eve, the park is filled with floral displays, holiday lights, and Christmas-themed character installations.

Taipei Water Park also houses the Museum of Drinking Water (a museum of water tap engineering, dating back to the era of the Japanese Colonisation of Taiwan).

Guanyin Mountain Reservoir, known as the "Underwater Cistern" is also on park premises. One of the designated historical monument buildings of the 'Taipei Waterway Water Source Area', this facility was retired after the completion of a modern water purification plant in 1977; it reopened in 2019 in an attempt to promote Taiwanese domestic tourism.

There is an Environmental Education site on the premises of Taipei Water Park. Also on the park property is a five hectare (ha.) area for local ecological exploration, Little Guangyin Hill, containing many examples of native broad leaved woods ecology of low latitude.

A modestly sized hiking area also exists on the area's property, the Guanyin Hill Hiking Area.

On 27 July 2016, a fire broke out at the park, prompting the evacuation of 1,200 visitors. The fire started from a solar panel grid.

== Transportation ==
The museum is within walking distance of Taipei's Gongguan metro station.

== See also ==
- List of parks in Taiwan
- List of tourist attractions in Taiwan
