= Au Fung-Chi =

Au Fung-Chi (Chinese: 區鳳墀) (1847–1914), was a Hong Kong Protestant church leader. He was an Elder of To Tsai Church (道濟會堂), which was Sun Yat-sen's place of worship while he studied medicine in Hong Kong. Au was Sun's teacher of Chinese literature, and gave Sun the pseudonym name Yìxiān (Chinese: 逸仙; Sidney Lau: Yat^{6} Sin^{1}). Au was also the Secretary of the Department of Chinese Affairs.

== See also ==
- Names of Sun Yat-sen
- Christianity in Hong Kong
