= Museum of Zoology =

Museum in Da'an, Taipei, Taiwan

NTU Museum of Zoology
- 動物博物館
- Established: 1928 (original building); 1998 (current building)
- Location: Da'an, Taipei, Taiwan
- Coordinates: 25°00′55″N 121°32′19″E
- Type: university museum, zoology
- Public transit access: Gongguan Station
- Website: zoology.lifescience.ntu.edu.tw

The Museum of Zoology (traditional Chinese: 動物博物館; simplified Chinese: 动物博物馆; pinyin: Dòngwù Bówùguǎn) of National Taiwan University (NTU) is a museum about zoology at the NTU main campus in Da'an District, Taipei, Taiwan.

== History ==
The museum was originally established in 1928 during the Japanese rule. In the early days, recording of fauna in Taiwan and its neighboring areas such as Asia and Hainan was the major purpose of its collections. As time passed by, rodents and fishes became the main collection targets. In recent years, the collections expanded to include earthworms, bats, shrews, larval fishes etc.

== Transportation ==
The museum is accessible within walking distance northeast from Gongguan Station of the Taipei Metro.

== See also ==
- List of museums in Taiwan
- National Taiwan University
