= Renai Road =

Road in Taipei, Taiwan

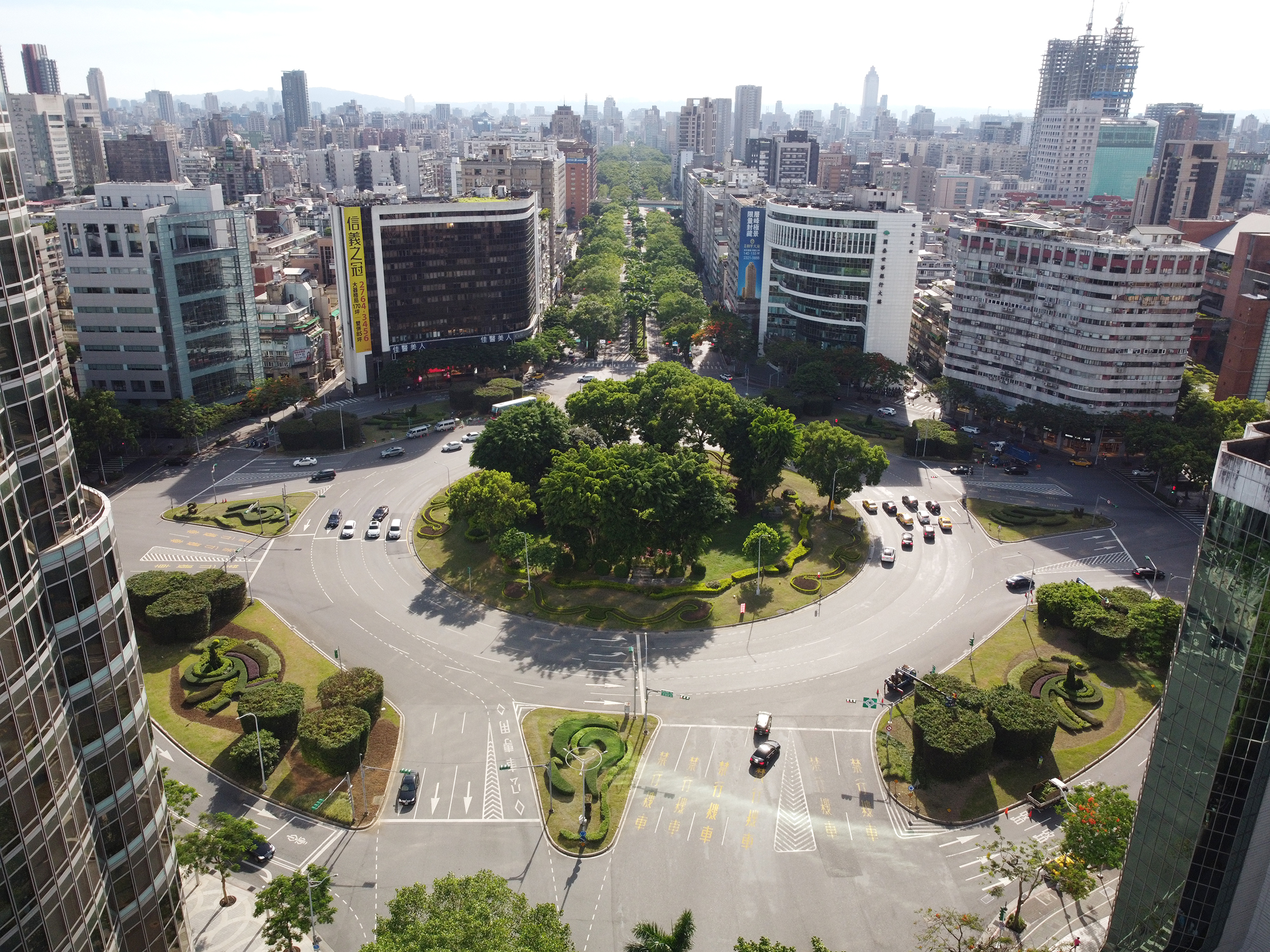
Ren'ai–Dunhua traffic circle, one of the largest traffic circles in the world.

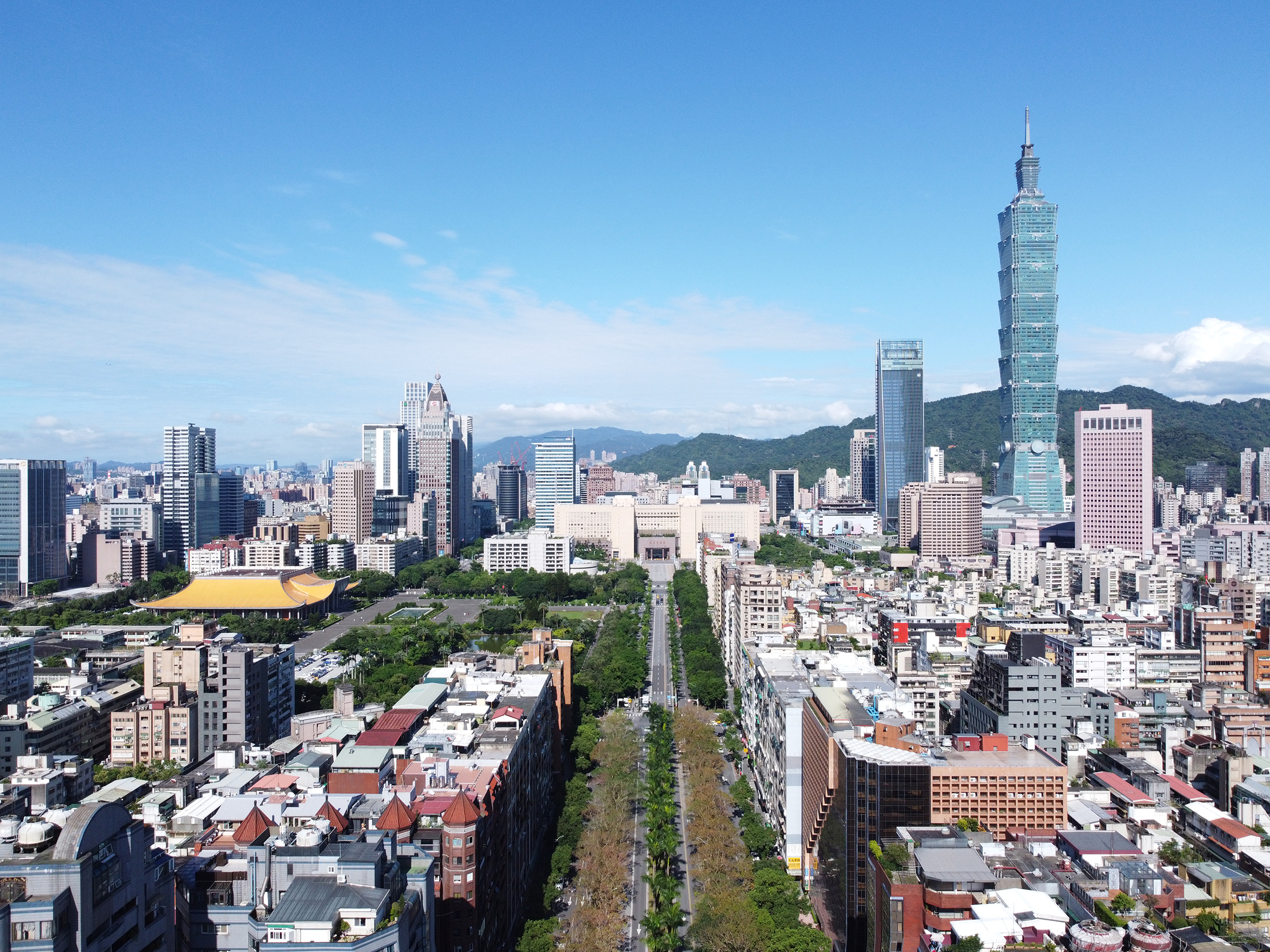
Taipei Skyline viewed from Section 4 Ren'ai Road.

Ren'ai Road (Chinese: 仁愛路; pinyin: Rén'ài Lù, sometimes spelled RenAi, Renai or Ren-Ai) is a major arterial road in Taipei, Taiwan, connecting the Xinyi District in the east with the Daan District and Zhongzheng District towards the west.

Ren'ai Road forms a one-way couplet with Xinyi Road between Taipei City Hall and Zhongshan Road, with Ren'ai for westbound traffic and Xinyi for eastbound traffic. Along with Xinyi Road, Ren'ai Road has a contraflow bus only lane in the middle of the roadway. Plans to make the road two-way were shelved in 2015. The primarily one-way nature of the road, but with a contraflow bus-lane going the other way, was blamed for the death of US neuroscientist Bruce Bridgeman, who had been looking one way and not the other whilst crossing the road, but was struck by a bus going through the bus-only lane. Following the accident, bilingual English and Chinese signage was installed on the crossings on Ren'ai Road in 2017.

As of 2023, the Palace mansion on Ren'ai Road had been valued as Taiwan's most valuable residential property for 13 years running.

== Sections ==
Unlike other Taipei arterials, Ren'ai Road does not have directional sections dividing the entire stretch of road, only divided-numbered sections.

- Section 1: Zhongshan S. Road – Hangzhou S. Road
- Section 2: Hangzhou S. Road – Xinsheng S. Road
- Section 3: Xinsheng S. Road – Fuxing S. Road
- Section 4: Fuxing S. Road – Shifu Road

== Major intersections ==
- Zhongshan Road
- Linsen Road
- Jinshan Road
- Xinsheng Road
- Jianguo Road
- Fuxing Road
- Dunhua Road
- Yanji Street
- Guangfu Road
- Shifu Road

== Other ==
The eastern terminus of Ren'ai Road is designed with unique aesthetic features since the end of the road faces the entrance of Taipei City Hall.

== See also ==
- List of roads in Taiwan
