= Gongguan, Taipei =

Commercial district of Taipei, Taiwan

Coordinates: 25°00′58″N 121°31′57″E

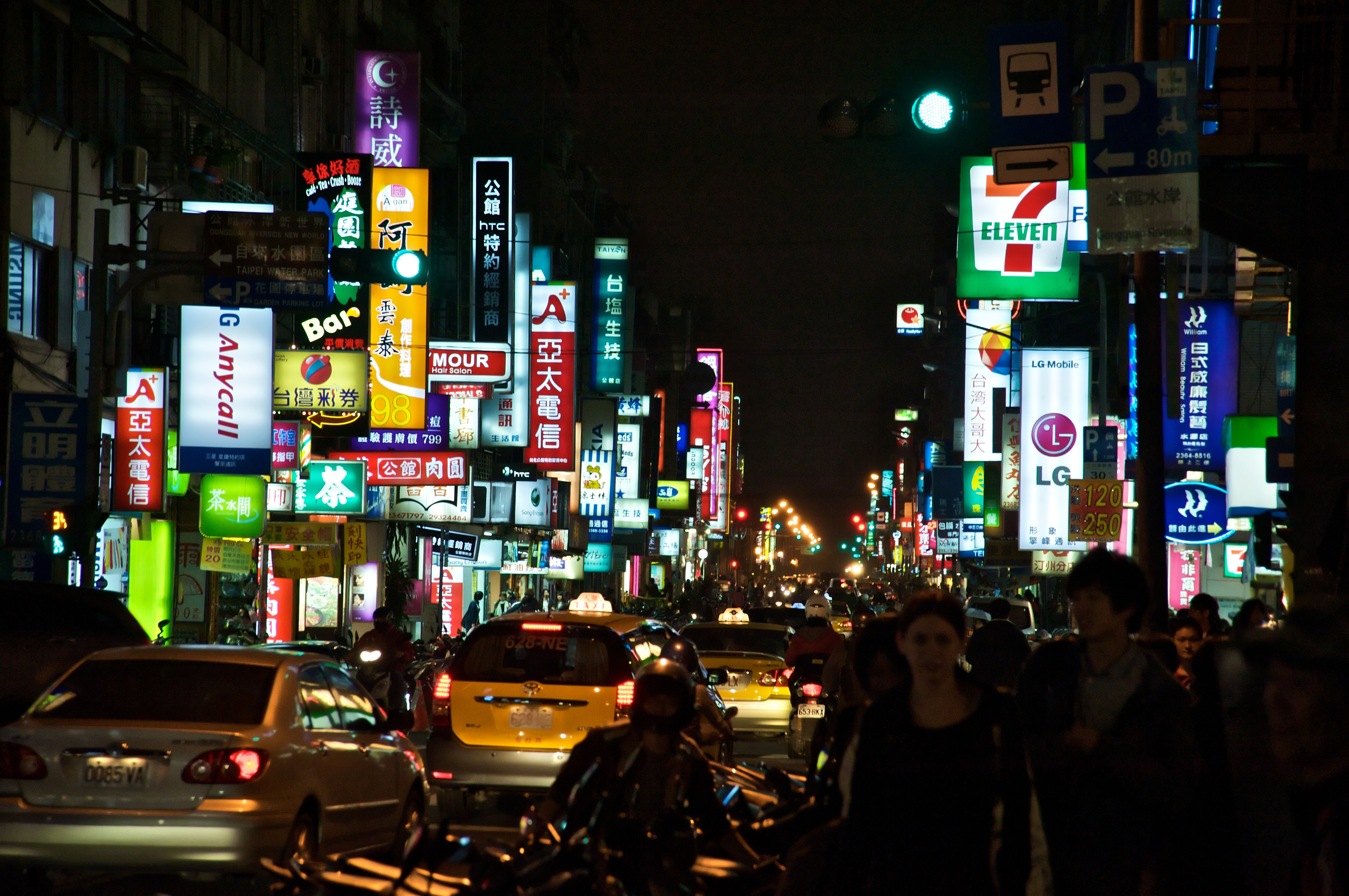
Night scene

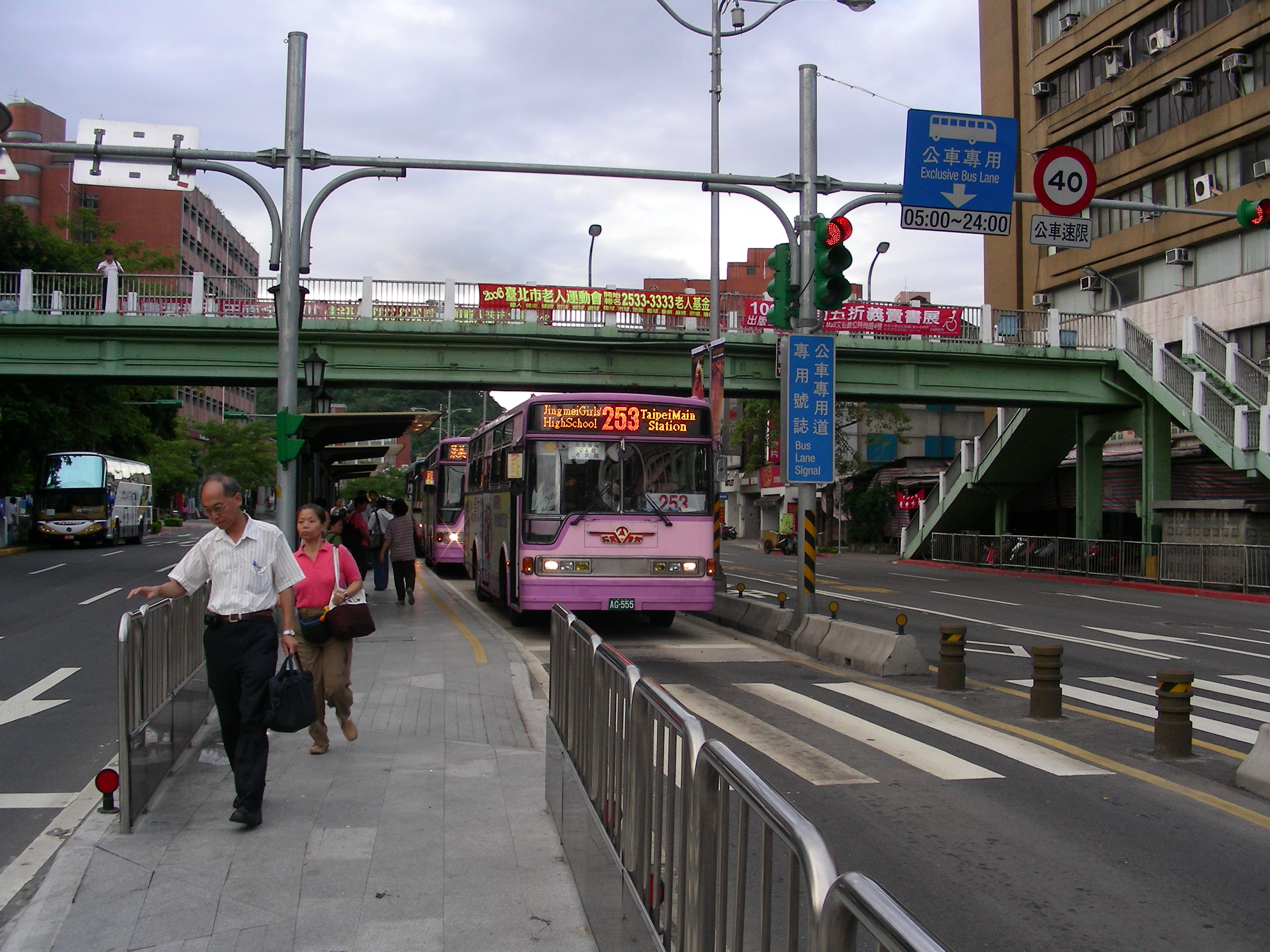
Roosevelt Road, the main street running through Gongguan.

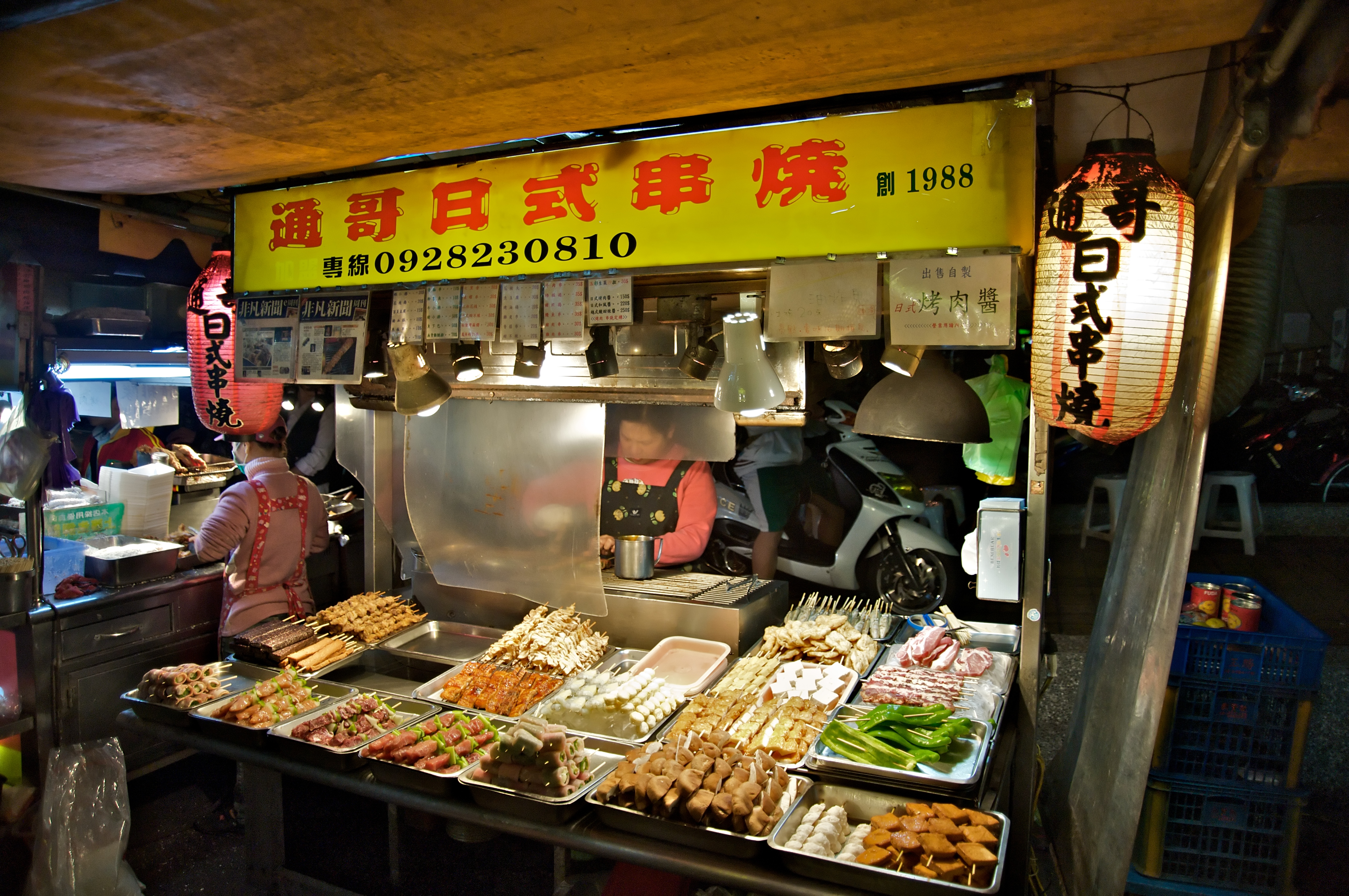
Yakitori street vendor

Gongguan (Chinese: 公館; pinyin: Gōngguǎn; Pe̍h-ōe-jī: Kong-koán) is a commercial district straddling the Zhongzheng and Daan Districts of Taipei, Taiwan. It is a popular shopping and leisure area with a night market and it is also the location of the Gongguan Station of the Taipei Metro. Taiwan's most prestigious university, National Taiwan University, and the National Taiwan University of Science and Technology, National Taiwan Normal University, as well as the prestigious International Chinese Language Program are located in the area. Gongguan formerly housed Taipei Air Station, 327th Air Division, which was a U.S. Air Force installation closed on 7 Jan 1976 due to the withdrawal of American military forces from Taiwan. Gongguan is also the location of the old Taipei tap water facilities, now the Museum of Drinking Water. The name Gongguan can be traced to the Kangxi Era of the Qing Dynasty, when colonial chiefs established public houses (Chinese: 公館; pinyin: Gongguan) that facilitated trade between the Han Chinese settlers and local aboriginal traders.
