= Names of Sun Yat-sen =

Sun Yat-sen (Cantonese)
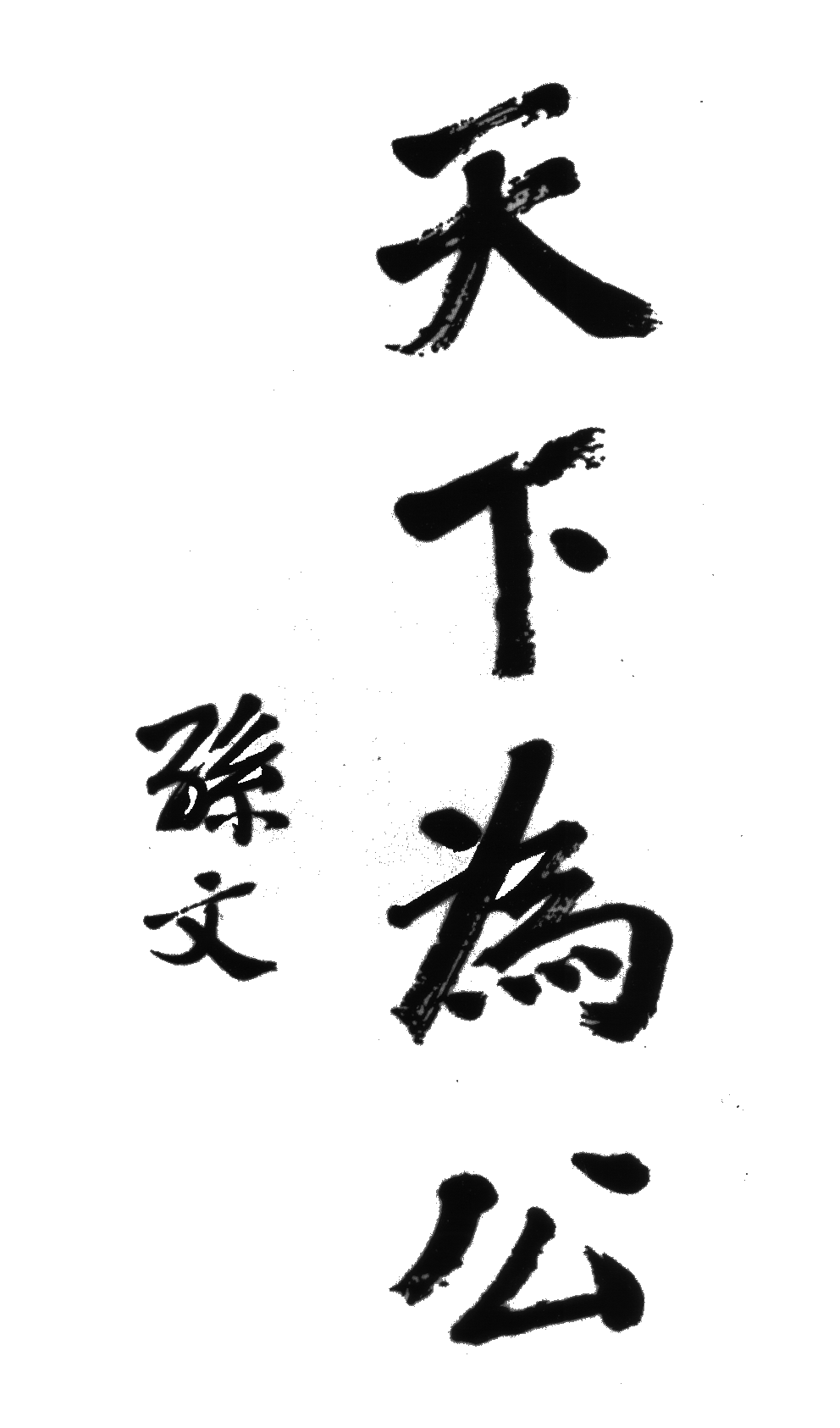
- Calligraphy signed by Sun Wen, using his big name

Chinese name
- Traditional Chinese: 孫中山
- Simplified Chinese: 孙中山
Transcriptions
Standard Mandarin
- Hanyu Pinyin: Sūn Zhōngshān
- Wade–Giles: Sun Chung-shan
- IPA: [swə́n ʈʂʊ́ŋʂán]
Hakka
- Romanization: Sûn Chûng-sân
Yue: Cantonese
- Yale Romanization: Syūn Jūngsāan
- Jyutping: Syun1 Zung1-saan1
Southern Min
- Hokkien POJ: Sun Tiong-san

Alternative Chinese name
- Traditional Chinese: 孫逸仙
- Simplified Chinese: 孙逸仙
Transcriptions
Standard Mandarin
- Hanyu Pinyin: Sūn Yìxiān
- Wade–Giles: Sun I-hsien
- IPA: [swə́n îɕjɛ́n]
Hakka
- Romanization: sun^{44}Id^{1}-sien^{44}
Yue: Cantonese
- Yale Romanization: Syūn Yahtsīn
- Jyutping: Syun1 Jat6-sin1
Southern Min
- Hokkien POJ: Sun Ek-sian

Vietnamese name
- Vietnamese: Tôn Trung Sơn

Japanese name
- Kanji: 中山樵

Lesser known names
- Traditional Chinese: 1. Genealogy name: 德明; 2. Big name: 文 3. Small name: 帝象; 4. Courtesy: 載之; 5. Baptised: 日新; 6. Pseudonym: 逸仙
- Simplified Chinese: 1. Genealogy name: 德明; 2. Big name: 文 3. Small name: 帝象; 4. Courtesy: 载之; 5. Baptised: 日新; 6. Pseudonym: 逸仙
Transcriptions
Standard Mandarin
- Hanyu Pinyin: 1. Démíng; 2. Wén; 3. Dìxiàng; 4. Zaizhi; 5. Rìxīn; 6. Yìxiān
- Wade–Giles: 1. Te-ming; 2. Wen; 3. Ti-hsiang; 4. Tsai-chih; 5. Jih-hsin; 6. Yih-hsien
Yue: Cantonese
- Yale Romanization: 1. Dākmìng; 2. Màn; 3. Daijeuhng; 4. Joijī; 5. Yahtsān; 6. Yahtsīn
- Jyutping: 1. Dak1ming4; 2. Man4; 3. Dai3zoeng6; 4. Zoi3zi1; 5. Jat6san1; 6. Jat6sin1

Honorary title
- Traditional Chinese: 國父
- Simplified Chinese: 国父
- Literal meaning: Father of the Nation
Transcriptions
Standard Mandarin
- Hanyu Pinyin: Guófù
- Wade–Giles: Kuo-fu
- IPA: [kwǒfû]
Yue: Cantonese
- Yale Romanization: Gwokfuh
- Jyutping: Gwok3fu6

Like many Chinese, Sun Yat-sen used different names at different points in his life and he is known in Chinese under several of them. Names are not taken lightly in Chinese culture. This reverence goes as far back as Confucius and his insistence on "rectification of names".

In addition to the names and aliases listed below, Sun Yat-sen also used other aliases while he was a revolutionary in exile.

== Genealogical name: Sun Tak Ming (孫德明) ==
The "real" name of Sun Yat-sen, the name inscribed in the genealogical records of his family, is Sun Tak Ming (traditional Chinese: 孫德明; simplified Chinese: 孙德明; pinyin: Sūn Démíng; Wade–Giles: Sun Te-ming). This "genealogical name" (譜名; 谱名; pǔmíng) is what extended relatives of the Sun family would have known him by. This is a name that was used in formal occasions. The first Chinese character of the given name, (德; dé), is the generation character which he shared with his brother and his relatives on the same generation line. Traditionally, this name was not used outside the family, and is not widely recognized in mainland China or Taiwan (although other historical figures such as Mao Zedong are known by their "register name"), and even many Chinese people wrongly assume that Tak-ming was his courtesy name (字; zì).

== Small name: Sun Tai Tseung (孫帝象) ==
Traditionally, Chinese families would wait a certain number of years before officially naming their offspring. In the meantime, they used so-called "milk names" (乳名; rǔmíng) which were given to the infant shortly after his birth, and which were known only by the close family.

Thus, his child name was Sun Tai Tseung (孫帝象; Sūn Dìxiàng). So this name Sun Tai Tseung is also referred to as his small name (小名). This name, however, was not the name that he received when he was born.

Sun's parents dedicated his name to the deity Xuan Wu Shangdi, so the first character of his milk name (and of his brother too) was di, in reference to the god.

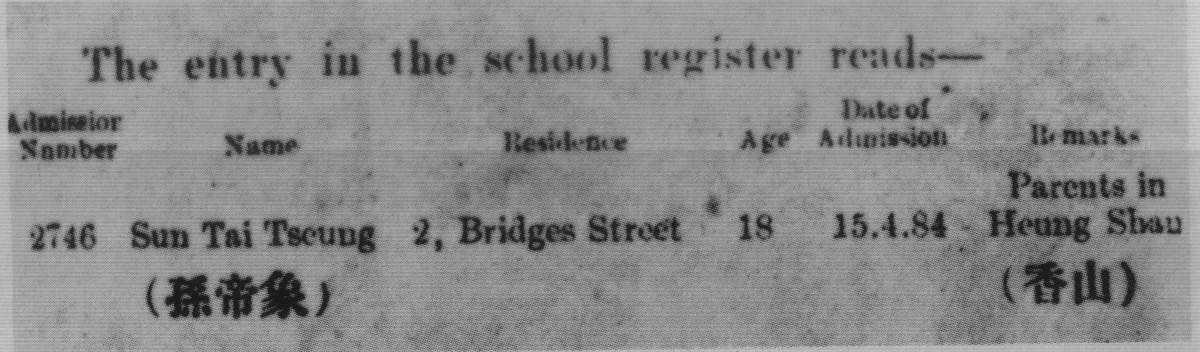
A school registration paper used with Sun Tai Tseung

== Big name: Sun Wen (孫文) ==
Sun's original name (原名) in China after babyhood was Sun Wen (孫文; Sūn Wén), given by his primary school teacher. Colloquially, these names are known as the big name (大名), whereas the "milk name", and sometimes the school name, is known as the "small name" (小名; xiǎo míng).

His name Sun Wen is very well known among Chinese. After attaining public office, Sun consistently used this name, Sun Wen, to sign official documents.

== Baptised name: Sun Yat-sun (孫日新) ==
In 1883, 17-year-old Sun Yat-sen was baptized as a Christian when he started his studies in Hong Kong. On that occasion, he chose himself the baptized name (敎名; jiàomíng) of "Yat-sun" (Chinese: 日新; pinyin: Sūn Rìxīn; Cantonese Yale: Yahtsān; IPA: [jɐt˨ sɐn˥]), meaning "renew oneself daily".

== Western name: Sun Yat-sen (孫逸仙) ==
This is the name he used while he was a student in Hong Kong around 1883. Au Fung-Chi gave Sun the name Yet-sen (逸仙; IPA: [jɐt˨ si:n˥], pinyin: Yìxiān; Cantonese Yale: Yahtsīn). As this was the name that he used in his frequent contacts with Westerners at the time, he became known under this name in the West. When he signed his name in English, he used Sun Yat-sen, as his native language was Cantonese.

A street in Macau has the name Avenida Dr. Sun Yat-sen (Chinese: 孫逸仙大馬路; Jyutping: syun1 jat6 sin1 daai6 maa5 lou6; pinyin: Sūn Yìxiān Dàmǎlù). Many Chinese cities have a road named 逸仙路 Yìxiān Lù in memory of him.

== Courtesy names: Sun Tsai-chih (孫載之) ==
Later, Sun Yat-sen chose a courtesy name (字), which was Tsai-chih (載之) meaning "conveying it", based on the Chinese philosophical saying "literature as a vehicle to convey the Tao" (文以載道; wén yǐ zài dào). Courtesy names in China often tried to bear a connection with the personal name of the person. His courtesy name, however, was apparently seldom used, and is rarely known in the Chinese world. He has been referred to with the surname Sun as Sun Tsai-chih (孫載之).

== Japanese name: Nakayama Shō (中山樵) ==
In September 1895 young Japanese philosopher Tōten Miyazaki was passionate about the revolutions in China. As a friend he wanted to help Sun while he was in Japan. When they arrived at the "Crane Hotel" in Miyazaki Prefecture, for Sun's safety, he used an alias name to register in the hotel.

Previously on their travel they passed by a board that used the common Japanese family name Nakayama (中山; "middle mountain"). So he signed into the hotel book and was referred to under that name. He then added the Japanese personal name Shō (樵; "woodsman").

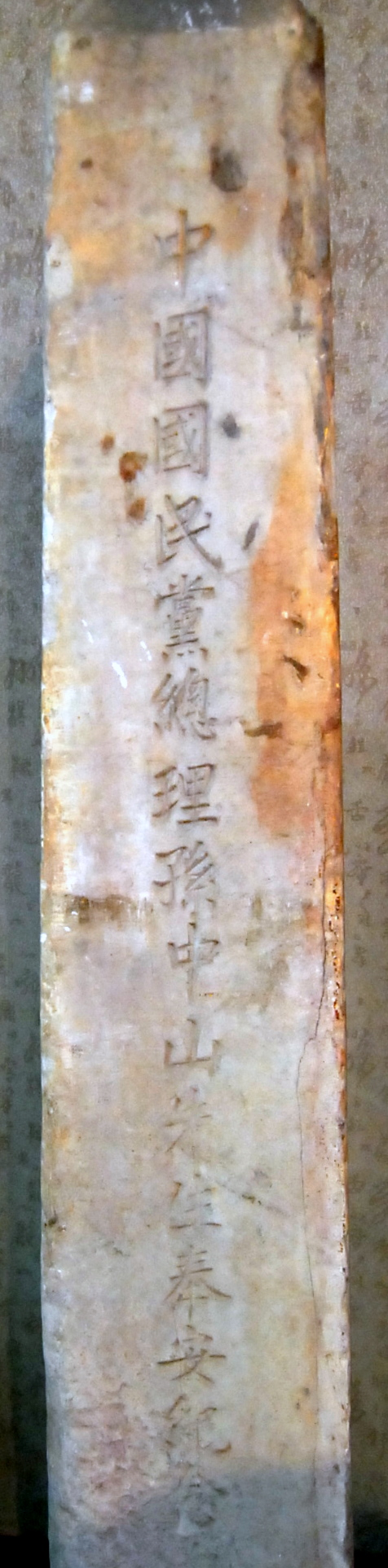
A stone using the more common name in Chinese, Zhongshan

== Chinese name: Sun Chung-shan (孫中山) ==
After the establishment of the Republic of China in 1912, and he was no longer pursued by the Qing authorities, local people could refer to him as Sun Wen (孫文) again. But the name Chung-shan (中山), the Chinese pronunciation of his Japanese pseudonym, "Nakayama," was more commonly used later in his life (and to present day). Today, the overwhelming majority of Chinese references to Sun use Sun Chung-shan (traditional Chinese: 孫中山; simplified Chinese: 孙中山; pinyin: Sūn Zhōngshān; Cantonese Yale: Syūn Jūngsāan).

Many cities in both mainland China and Taiwan feature streets and many other public facilities so named, for example Zhongshan Roads, Zhongshan Parks, and Zhongshan warship. His hometown Heungshan (香山; Xiāngshān) County was renamed to Zhongshan as an honour.

== Honorary title: Guofu (國父) ==
In 1940, well after the death of Sun Yat-sen, the Kuomintang government officially conferred on the late Sun the title Guófù (國父), meaning "Father of the Nation". This title is still frequently used in the Republic of China in Taiwan.

In the People's Republic of China on mainland China, the title "Forerunner of the Revolution" (革命先行者; Gémìng Xiānxíngzhě) is sometimes used instead, referring to Sun's importance as the main revolutionary forerunner to Mao Zedong.

However, people in Hong Kong still refer to Sun Yat-sen as Father of the Nation, even after the transfer of sovereignty to the People's Republic of China in 1997.

The honorific suffix Xīanshēng (先生) has also been applied to his name, sometimes even written with preceding Nuotai, as "孫中山先生" (pinyin: Sūn Zhōngshān xiānshēng). In English and many other languages, the equivalent of "Dr. Sun" is often seen.

== See also ==
- Chinese name
- Japanese name
