= Xinyi Road =

Road in Taipei, Taiwan

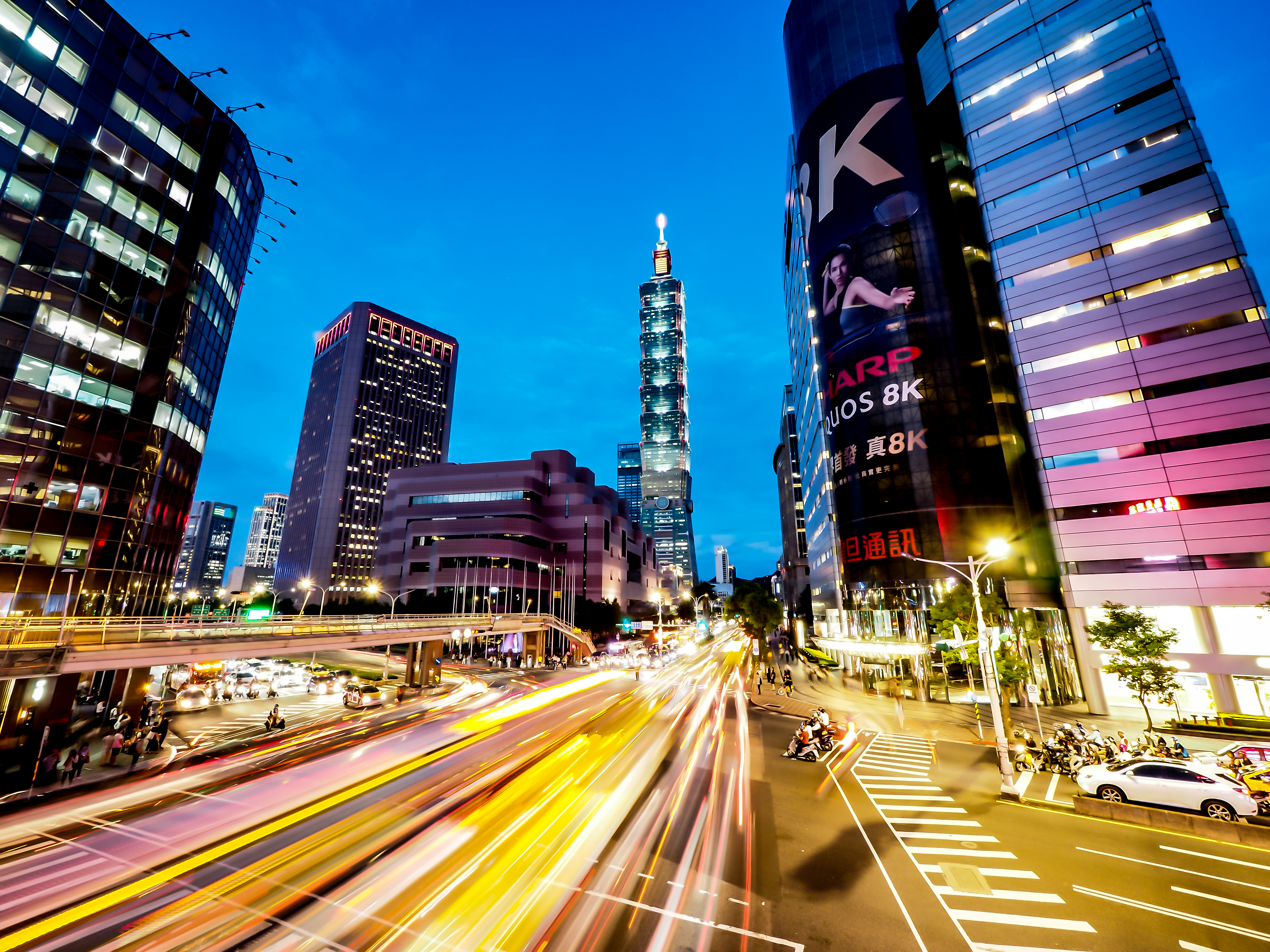
Xinyi Road at night.

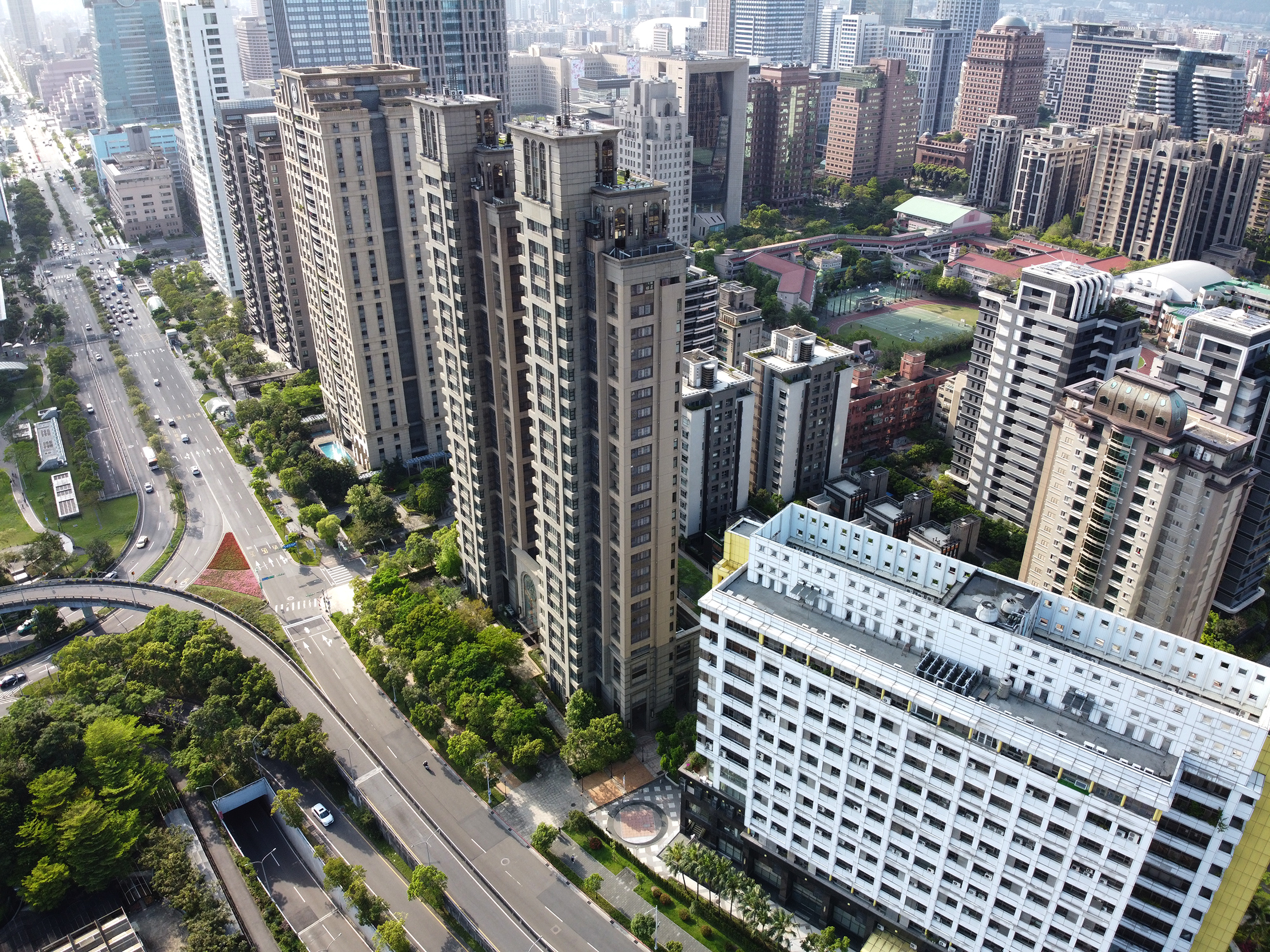
Section 5 Xinyi Road.

Xinyi Road (Chinese: 信義路; pinyin: Xìnyì Lù) is an arterial road in Taipei, Taiwan, connecting Zhongzheng District with Xinyi District in Taipei, Taiwan. Its western terminus is at the East Gate of Taipei's former city wall, at the intersection of Zhongshan Road, Ketagalan Boulevard, and Renai Road. Near the eastern terminus, there is an interchange with the Xinyi Expressway, which connects Xinyi Road with National Freeway 3 in Wenshan District.

Xinyi Road forms a one-way couplet with the nearby Renai Road, where Xinyi Road traffic travels eastbound, while Renai Road traffic travels westbound. As with Renai Road, Xinyi Road has a contraflow bus-only lane in the middle of the roadway.

Along Xinyi Road is the location of the original Din Tai Fung restaurant, which is famous for its Taiwanese dumplings, as well as the Taipei 101 skyscraper. The Xinyi Line of Taipei Metro runs underneath Xinyi Road.

== See also ==
- List of roads in Taiwan
