= List of streets named after Sun Yat-sen =

Zhongshan, Chungshan, or Jhongshan (Chinese: 中山路) is a common name of Chinese roads, usually in honor of Sun Yat-sen, better known in Chinese as "Sun Chungshan (Zhongshan)", who is considered by many to be the "Father of Modern China".

In Chinese cities, "Zhongshan Road" is often one of a city's principal roads. As a result, the road is often very long and divided into numbered sections. In Guangzhou, the Zhongshan Road is separated into eight sections, identified as the First Zhongshan Road to the Eighth Zhongshan Road. In Shanghai, Zhongshan Road stretches around the whole city, the road is divided into numerous sections, identified by a direction and a number, such as the East-1 Zhongshan Road.

In some exceptional cases, a "Zhongshan Road" can have other significance. Zhongshan Road in Shijiazhuang, for example, is named after the Zhongshan state and later commandery, not Sun Yat-sen.

== History ==
Sun Yat-sen, a leader of the Republican revolution of the early 20th century, was remembered in China with great fervor after his death in 1925, and especially after his Kuomintang party re-unified China in 1928. As a result, numerous monuments were erected in his honor throughout China, and a large number of streets, parks and schools, and even his birth city (Zhongshan, Guangdong) were renamed in his honor.

When the Republic of China government took over Taiwan at the end of World War II, the practice of naming streets and parks after Sun, and erecting monuments in his honor, spread to the island as well.

Between 1928 and 1949, in a move designed to parallel the adulation of Sun, a number of roads and institutions were named "Zhongzheng", after Chiang Kai-shek, also known as "Jiang Zhongzheng", who saw himself as the successor to Sun.

In 1949, the Chinese Communist Party took control in mainland China and founded the People's Republic of China. Over the following years, streets and institutions named "Zhongzheng" were renamed, but Zhongshan Roads were not renamed, and survived "revolutionary" name changes in the Cultural Revolution. A conventional practice developed where no streets would be named after a political leader, except for Sun Yat-sen. In mainland China today, Sun Yat-sen remains the only modern politician commemorated in road names: no Communist leader, such as Mao Zedong or Deng Xiaoping, shares this privilege.

In Taiwan, Zhongshan (more commonly and locally spelled as "Jhongshan" or "Chungshan") Roads are as ubiquitous, if not more, compared to mainland China. In recent years, the administrative merging of neighboring towns have sometimes resulted in duplicate Zhongshan Roads within the same locality, and as a result some such roads have been renamed.

== List of Zhongshan Roads ==
- Zhongshan Road in Nanjing was a ceremonial avenue built for the purpose of conveying Sun Yat-sen' funeral procession to the Sun Yat-sen Mausoleum outside the city. It connects the Zhongshan port and the Zhongshan Gate. In 1933, the road was separated into North Zhongshan Road, Zhongshan Road and East Zhongshan Road. After the Chinese Civil War, Zhongzheng Road (named after Chiang Kai-shek), which was connected to the Zhongshan road, was renamed to South Zhongshan road.
- Zhongshan Road in Shanghai is the road marking the boundary of the traditional urban area, and forms an incomplete circle (the Huangpu River serves as part of the boundary). This road was built in the 1930s. The goals of building this road were to prevent the expansion of the foreigner concessions in Shanghai (i.e. the Shanghai International Settlement and French Concession in Shanghai) and to connect the three Chinese urban areas, Nanshi, Zhabei, and Jiangwan together. The Bund is today a section of the Zhongshan Road.
- Zhongshan Road in Guangzhou is separated into eight sections, identified as the First Zhongshan Road to the Eighth Zhongshan Road. There is another, separate, Zhongshan Avenue, which was an expressway built in 1928.
- Zhongshan Road in Xiamen is the main shopping street and leads to the main ferry terminals.
- Zhongshan Road in Quanzhou was awarded in 2001 with the Award of Merit of the UNESCO Asia-Pacific Awards for Cultural Heritage Conservation.
- Zhongshan Road in Shenyang, built in early 1930s, is also a main road in the city center, not far from Shenyang Railway Station.
- Zhongshan Road in Taipei is a major arterial.
- The Zhongshan Roads of Zhonghe District (formerly Zhonghe City) and Yonghe District (formerly Yonghe City) in Taiwan are connected.
- Zhongshan Road in Beijing was, formerly, the name of the short street at the northern end of Tiananmen Square, running from West Chang'an Gate, across the front of the Tiananmen gate, to East Chang'an Gate. After the reconstruction of the Square, the road became a section of Chang'an Avenue.
- Zhongshan Road in Hangzhou is the major arterial running north–south through the city. Originally called the Imperial Street during the southern Song dynasty, the road was renamed after Sun Yat-sen during the Republican era.
- Zhongshan Road (also known as the Qilou Arcade Streets, Qilou Old Street, and formerly Huanhaifang Road) was the first and one of many roads to be restored in the Bo'ai Road area of Haikou, Hainan.

== Roads named after other names of Sun Yat-sen ==
Yixian (逸仙), another name of Sun Yat-sen equivalent to the common English version of "Yat-sen", is also a popular road name. In Shanghai, Yixian Road connects the Inner and Outer Ringroad expressways.

Two roads in Macau SAR were built in the name of Sun Yat-sen, in honor of Sun, who lived in Macau during his lifetime. One road is called Avenida Dr. Sun Yat-sen (Chinese: 孫逸仙大馬路; lit. 'Sun Yat-sen Avenue'), located at the southern part of Macau Peninsula. The other road has the same name Avenida Dr. Sun Yat-sen (Chinese: 孫逸仙博士大馬路; lit. 'Dr. Sun Yat-sen Avenue'), located in Taipa. While the official Portuguese name of the two roads are the same, the Chinese names are different. There is also a traffic roundabout, called Rotunda Dr. Sun Yat-sen (孫逸仙博士圓形地) joins two sections of the Avenida Dr. Sun Yat-sen (Taipa) as well as the Avenida de Guimarães (基馬拉斯大馬路).

A street in Medan, Indonesia also named in honor of him, named as Jalan Sun Yat-Sen. There is a 16-floor hotel nearby called Citi International Sun Yat-Sen Hotel, named after the street itself.

"Sun Yat Sen Street" in central Calcutta of West Bengal, India, is also named in honor of Sun. The street is located in the part of Calcutta known as the Old China Town. The area once hosted nearly 20,000 ethnic Chinese residents, and although the ethnic Chinese population has drastically declined to 1–2,000, the area remains popular among Bengalis because of its unique street market and Chinese breakfast hub, Tiretta Bazaar. There is also a street named Dr Sun Yat Sen Street on the Island of Mauritius.

== Literal meaning of characters ==
The literal meaning of the characters zhong and shan are "Central/Middle" and "Mountain"; the name was adopted by Sun Yat-sen while in Japan in the early 1900s. For more information on the names of Sun Yat-sen, see Names of Sun Yat-sen.
