= Gongguan metro station =

Metro station in Taipei, Taiwan

Gongguan 公館
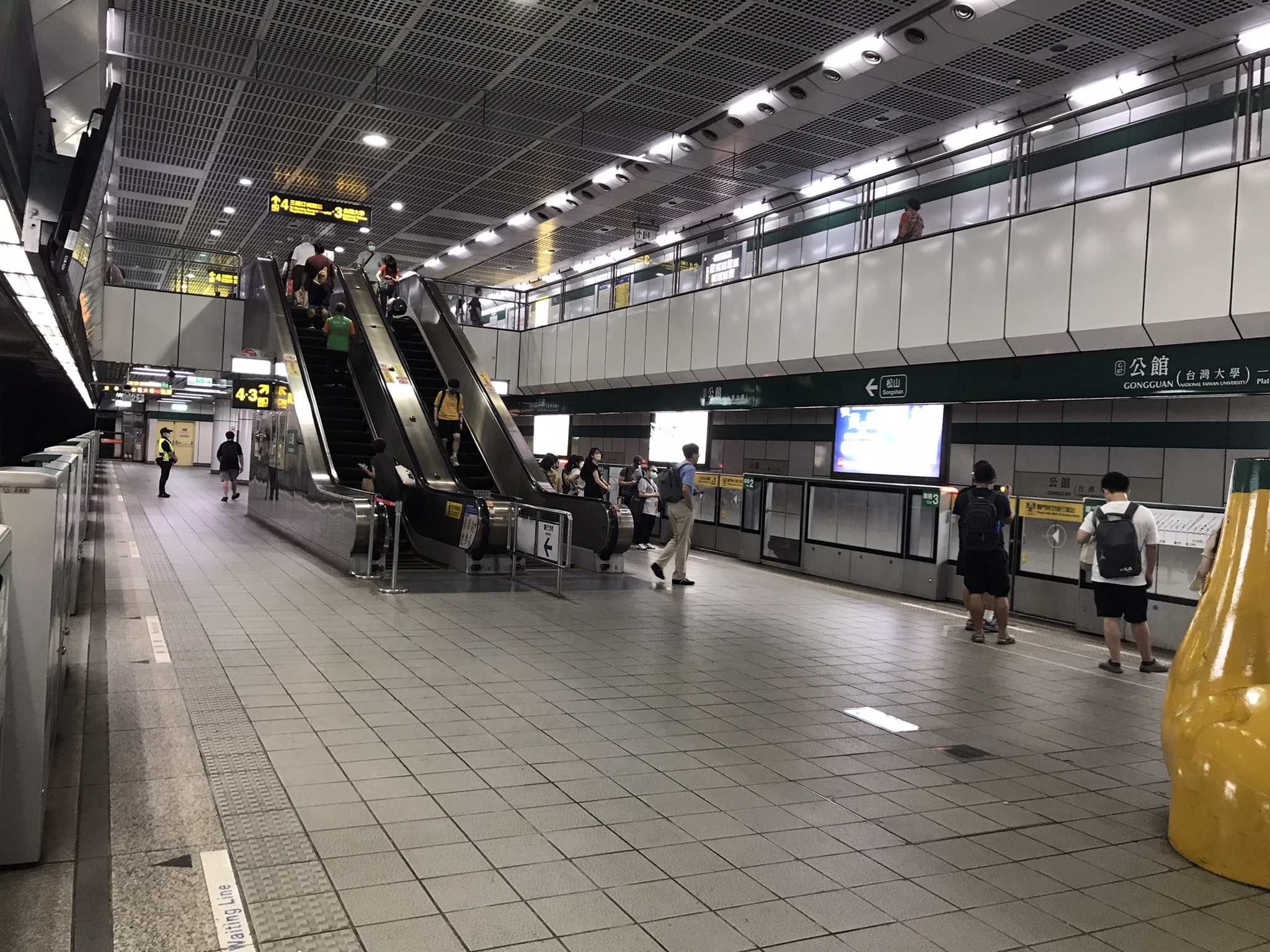
- Platform

Chinese name
- Traditional Chinese: 公館
- Simplified Chinese: 公馆
Transcriptions
Standard Mandarin
- Hanyu Pinyin: Gōngguǎn
- Bopomofo: ㄍㄨㄥ ㄍㄨㄢˇ
- Wade–Giles: Kung¹-kuan³
Hakka
- Pha̍k-fa-sṳ: Kûng-kón
Southern Min
- Tâi-lô: Kong-kuán

General information
- Other names: National Taiwan University (台灣大學)
- Location: B1F 74-1 Sec 4 Roosevelt Rd; Zhongzheng and Da'an, Taipei; Taiwan
- Coordinates: 25.0148°N 121.5342°E
- System: Taipei metro station
- Line: Songshan–Xindian line

Construction
- Structure type: Underground
- Cycle facilities: Access available

Other information
- Station code: G07
- Website: web.metro.taipei/e/stationdetail2010.asp?ID=G07-039

History
- Opened: 1999-11-11

Key dates
- 15 November 2014; 11 years ago: Songshan–Xindian line added

Passengers
- 2024: 57,600 daily (December 2024)
- Rank: (Ranked 25 of 119)

Services
Preceding station	Taipei Metro	Following station
Taipower Building towards Songshan	Songshan–Xindian line	Wanlong towards Xindian
Location

Gongguan (Chinese: 公館, formerly transliterated as Kungkuan Station until 2003) is a metro station in Taipei, Taiwan served by the Taipei Metro Songshan–Xindian line. National Taiwan University, the most prestigious university of Taiwan, is close to the station.

== Station overview ==
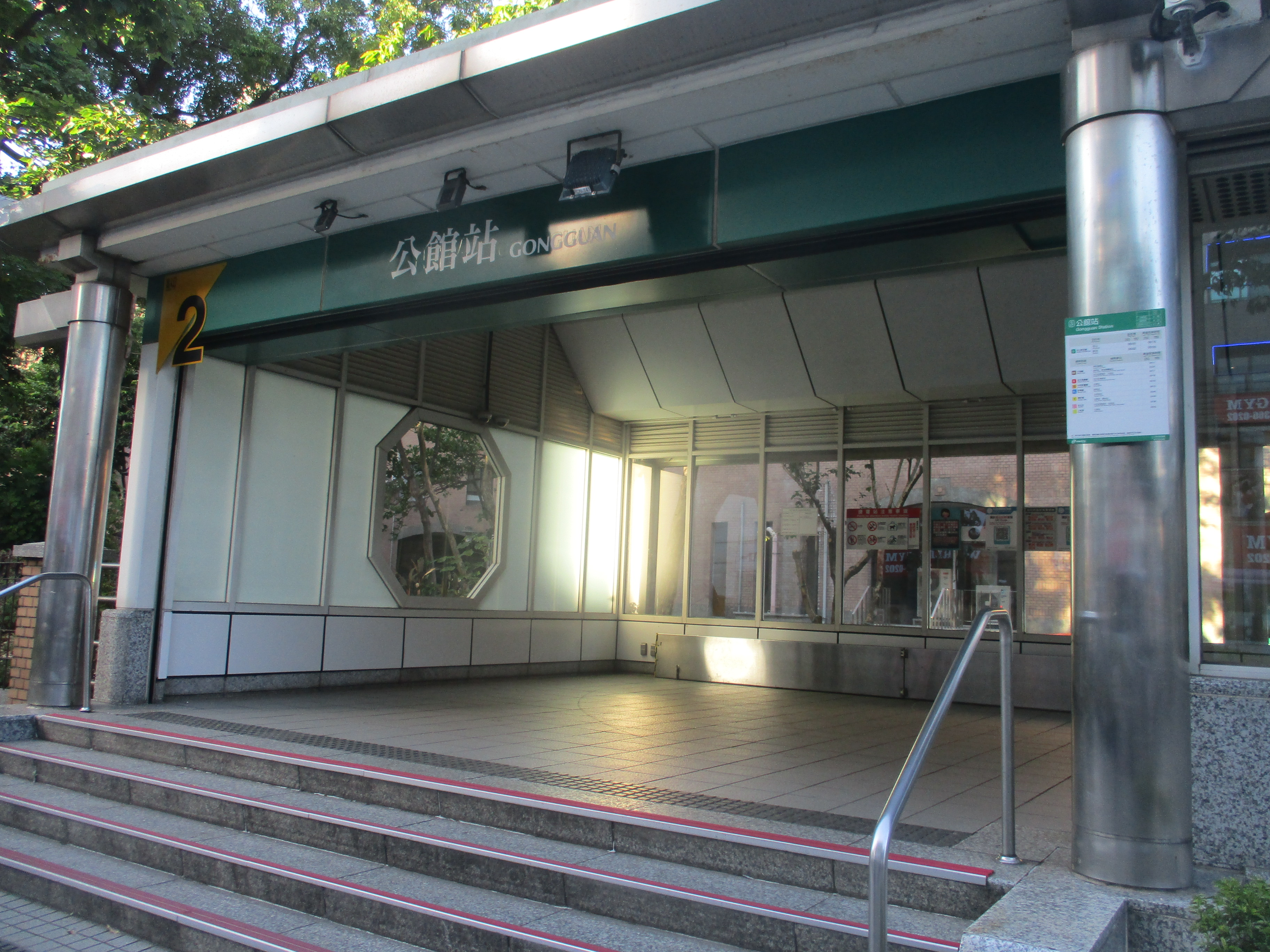
Gongguan station exit 2

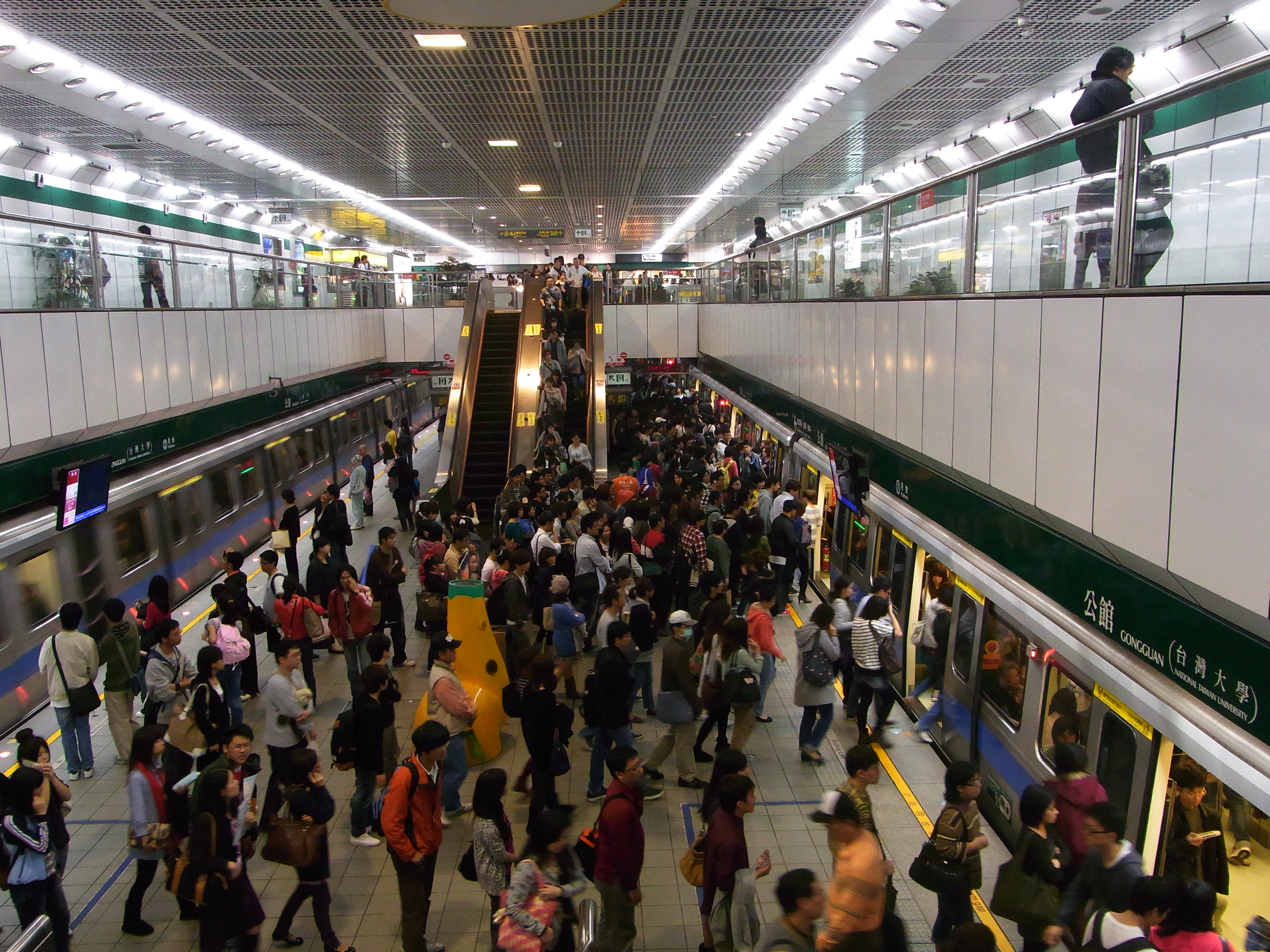
Gongguan station platform (high angle shot)

This two-level, underground station has an island platform and four exits. The washrooms are outside the entrance area.

== History ==
Originally, two separate stations were planned: one to serve National Taiwan University and the other (to be named Gongguan station) at the junction of Roosevelt Road and Keelung Road. The two stations were later combined as one and moved to the present location, where it began operation on 11 November 1999.

Another accessible elevator is opened at exit 2 to serve the National Taiwan University community. It was completed after a year of construction, on 16 June 2010.

== Station layout ==
Street level	Entrance/exit	Entrance/exit
B1	Concourse	Lobby, information counter, automatic ticket dispensing machines, one-way faregates
B1	Concourse	Restrooms (south side, outside fare zone, near exits 1&2), Gongguan Post Office
B2	Platform 1	← Songshan–Xindian line toward Songshan (G08 Taipower Building)
B2	Island platform, doors will open on the left
B2	Platform 2	→ Songshan–Xindian line toward Xindian (G06 Wanlong) →

== Around the station ==
- Museum of Zoology
- Taipei Water Park
- National Taiwan University
- Museum of Drinking Water
- Treasure Hill
- Gongguan Night Market

== See also ==
- Gongguan, Taipei
