= Museum of Drinking Water =

Museum in Zhongzheng, Taipei, Taiwan

- 臺北水道水源地
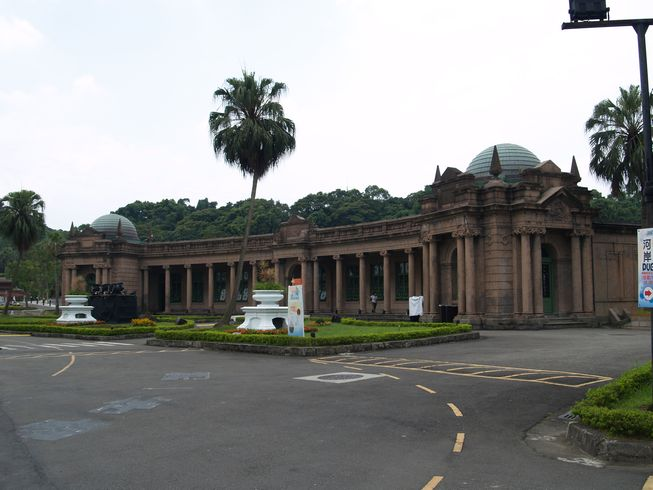
- Established: September 1993
- Location: Zhongzheng, Taipei, Taiwan
- Coordinates: 25°00′47″N 121°31′48″E
- Type: museum

The Museum of Drinking Water (traditional Chinese: 臺北水道水源地; simplified Chinese: 台北水道水源地; pinyin: Táiběi Shuǐdào Shuǐyuándì) is a museum about drinking water in Zhongzheng District, Taipei, Taiwan. The museum is located at Taipei Water Park.

== History ==
The museum building was originally built in 1908. It was declared a third-class historic site in 1993 and opened as a museum for the first time that September. In 1998, it shut down due to undergoing renovation. The museum was opened again on 30 April 2000 in an opening ceremony inaugurated by Taipei Mayor Ma Ying-jeou.

== Exhibitions ==
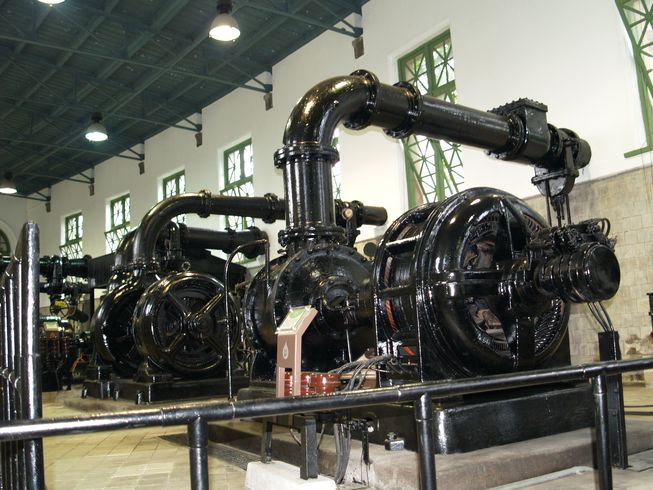
Water treatment facility

The museum has the following areas:

- Water treatment facility
- Outdoor equipment display area
- Hillside sidewalk area
- Playground

== Transportation ==
The museum is accessible within walking distance, southwest of Gongguan Station of the Taipei Metro.

== Gallery ==
Facade of the pumping room

Right view of the pumping room

Pumping room

Back of the pumping room

Pipes coming out from the pumping room

Pipes coming out from the pumping room

Low voltage switch panel exhibition

Interior of the Guanyinshan Reservoir

Walkway in the Guanyinshan Reservoir

== See also ==
- List of museums in Taiwan
- Water supply and sanitation in Taiwan
