= Roosevelt Road (Taipei) =

Avenue in Taipei, Taiwan

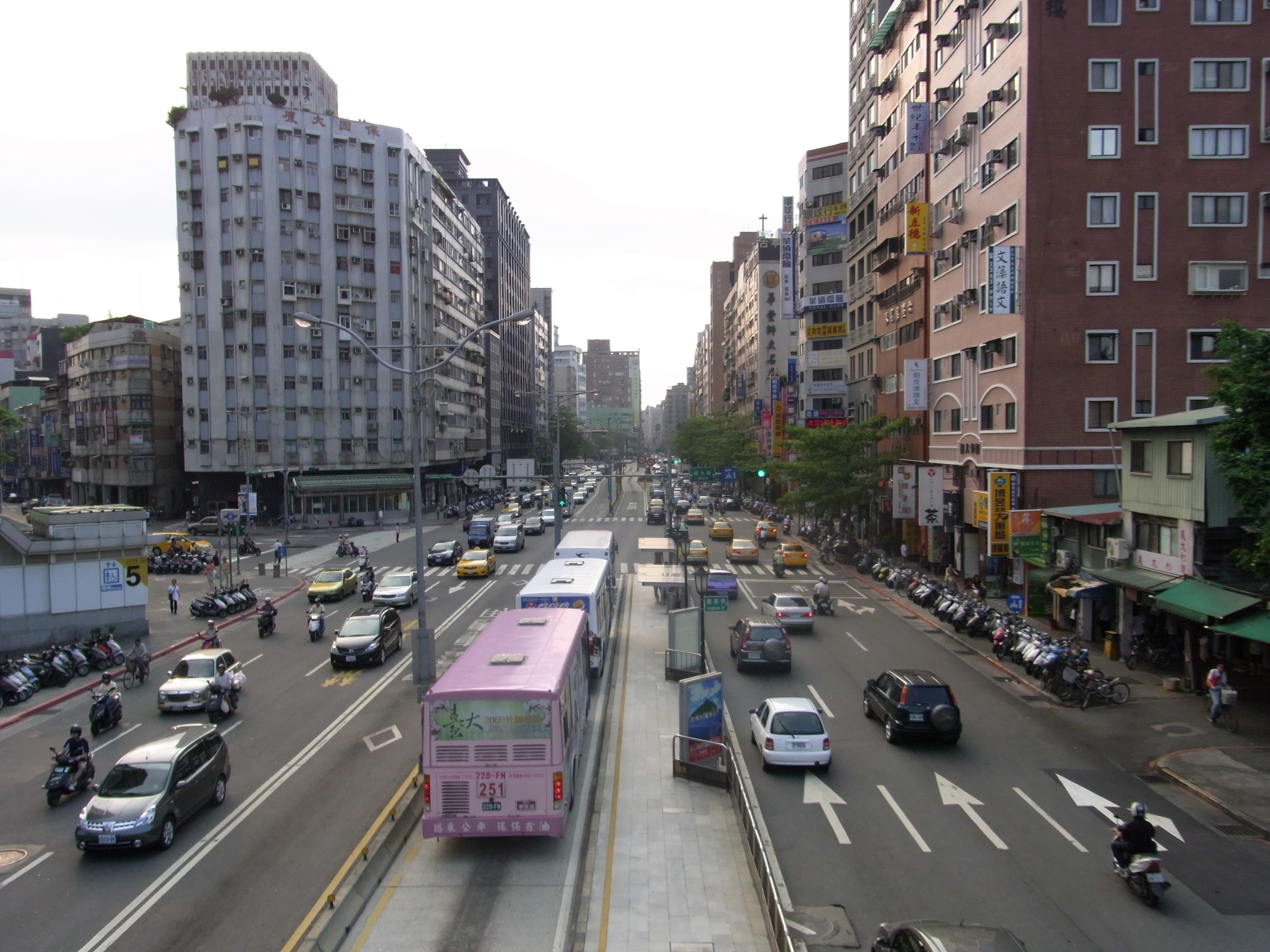
- Native name: 羅斯福路 (Chinese)
- Part of: Provincial Highway 9
- Type: Street
- Location: Taipei, Taiwan

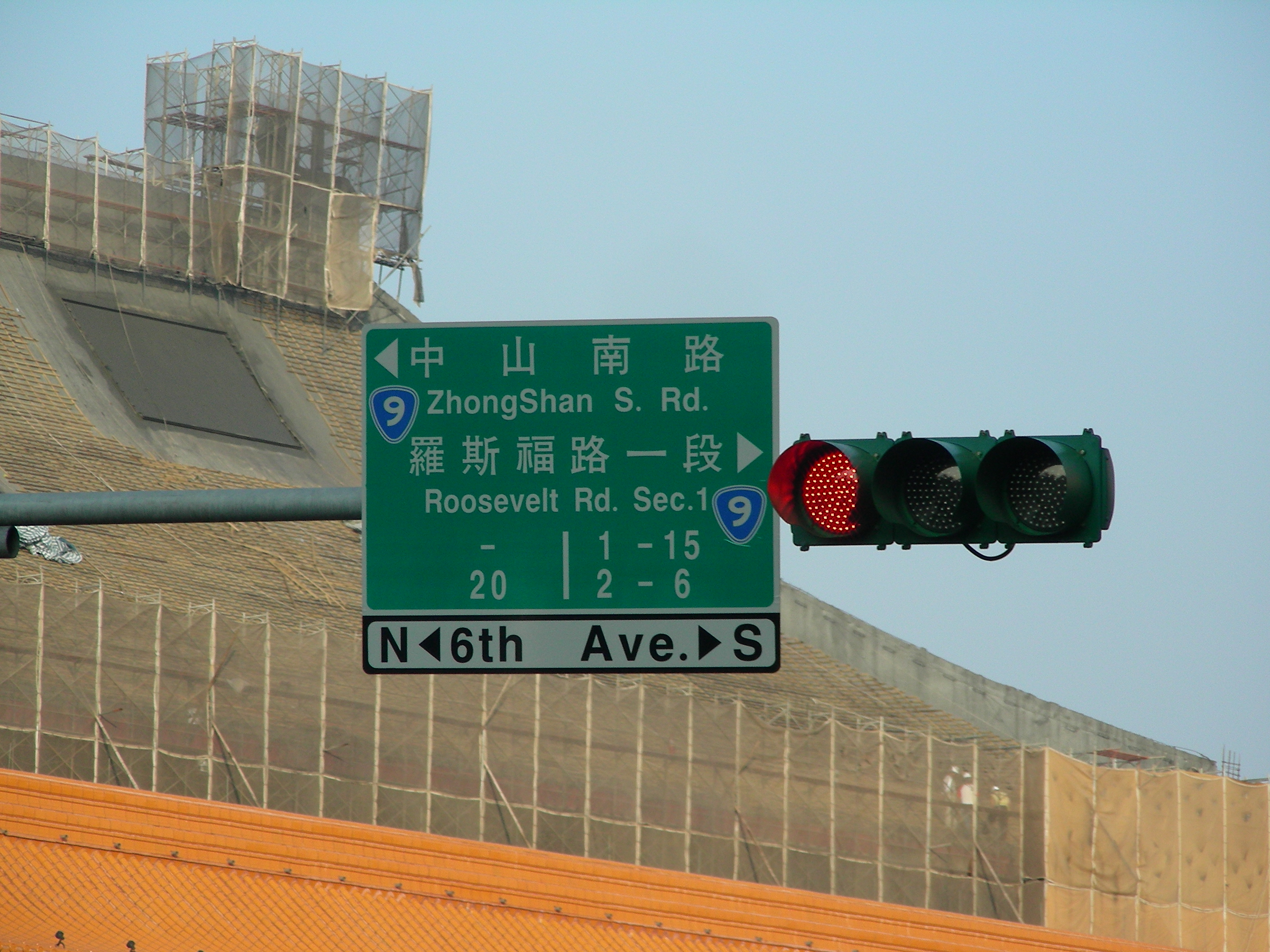
A road sign on Roosevelt Road.

Roosevelt Road (Chinese: 羅斯福路; pinyin: Luósīfú Lù) is a north–south avenue and part of Provincial Highway 9 in Taipei, Taiwan, connecting Zhongzheng District, Daan District and Wenshan District with Xindian District, New Taipei City in the south of the Taipei metropolitan area. It was named after U.S. President Franklin D. Roosevelt, making it the only street named for a Western figure in Taipei, excluding the former MacArthur Thruway.

== History ==
The road was built along the route of the old TRA Hsintien line, which closed in 1965.

Before being named Roosevelt, this road had a history dating back to the early 20th century. It was formed during the period from 1905 to 1932 when Taiwan was under Japanese rule. The name 'Roosevelt’ appeared on maps in 1945, right after the end of World War II. Just two years later, in 1947, the road underwent significant expansion, becoming a major north-south thoroughfare in the city. By 1961, Roosevelt Road already had six lanes. The upper section of Roosevelt Road has a much longer history than the rest. This area once housed buildings belonging to the Monopoly Bureau, an agency established by the Japanese to control the production and trade of essential goods such as tobacco, alcohol, camphor, table salt, and oil.

== Transport ==
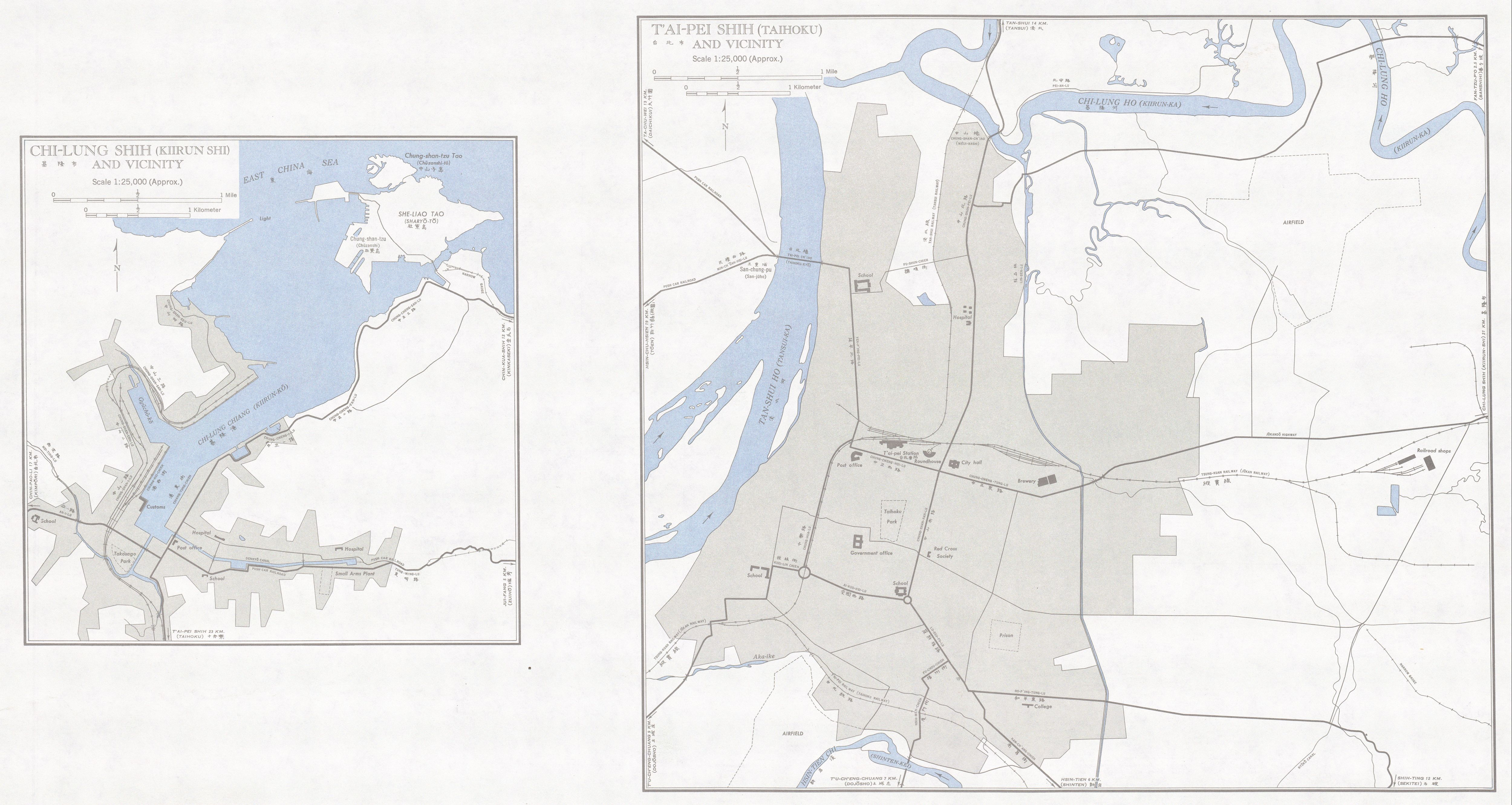
Map including Roosevelt Road (labeled as LO-SSU-FU-LU 羅斯福路) (1950s)

Roosevelt Road passes through a number of commercial districts, schools, and government offices. It is the major access road to downtown Taipei from southern suburbs like Xindian and Jingmei, with heavy traffic at peak hour.

Roosevelt Road is now served by Taipei metro Xindian Line. On the street level, two bus lanes are laid in the middle of the road.

== Points of interest ==
- Section 1
  - MRT Chiang Kai-shek Memorial Hall Station
  - Zhongzheng District Office and Nanmen Market
  - Central Bank
- Section 2
  - MRT Guting Station
  - Guting Market
  - Zhongzheng Junior High School & Nanchang Park
- Section 3
  - MRT Taipower Building Station
  - TMI- Taiwan Mandarin Institute
  - Taiwan Power Company Headquarters
  - Taipei Cultural Mosque
- Section 4
  - MRT Gongguan Station
  - National Taiwan University
  - Gongguan Night Market
- Section 5
  - MRT Wanlong Station
  - Wanfu Elementary School
- Section 6
  - MRT Jingmei Station
  - Jingmei Night Market

== See also ==
- List of roads in Taiwan
