= Old street =

Old Street is a street in London, United Kingdom. The street is the namesake for the following:

- Old Street Roundabout, a major road junction
- Old Street station, a railway station in the middle of Old Street Roundabout

Old street may also refer to:

== East Asia ==
In Chinese-speaking countries, the term lǎojiē, directly translated as "old street", refers to a historic district. They may be a single street, or a cluster of buildings in a neighborhood. Notable places with this name include:

- Anping Old Street, Tainan, Taiwan
- Daxi Old Street, Taoyuan, Taiwan
- Gaochun Old Street, Nanjing, China
- Nanzhuang Old Street, Miaoli, Taiwan
- Qibao Old Street, Shanghai, China
- Sanxia Old Street, New Taipei, Taiwan
- Shenkeng Old Street, New Taipei, Taiwan
- Tamsui Old Street, New Taipei, Taiwan
- Toucheng Old Street, Yilan, Taiwan
- Wulai Old Street, New Taipei, Taiwan
- Xinhua Old Street, Tainan, Taiwan

== Other ==
- Old Street drill hall, Ashton-under-Lyne
- Laojie River metro station, Taoyuan, Taiwan
