= Yuemei Route =

Route in Daxi, Taoyuan City, Taiwan

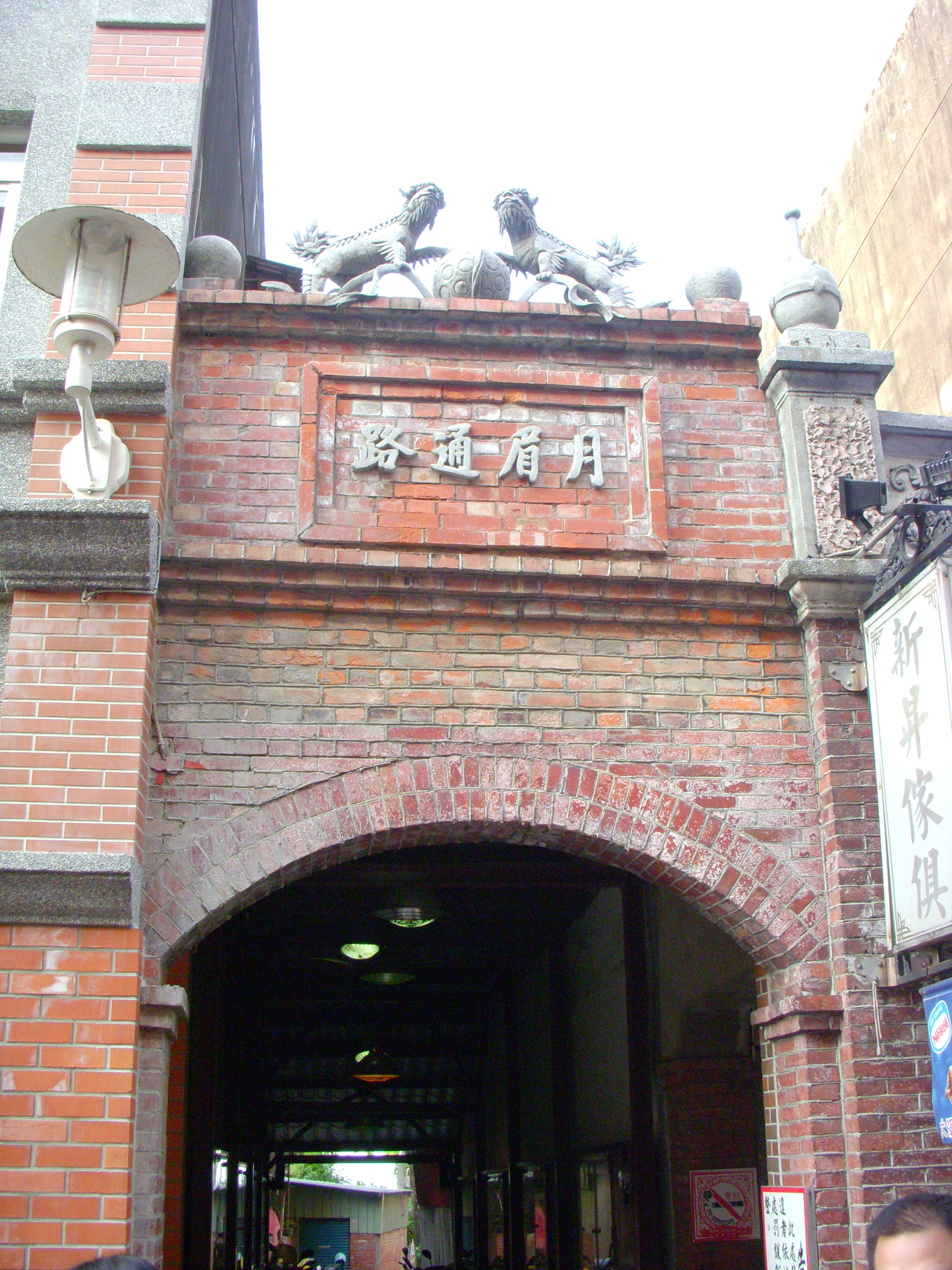

- Location within Taiwan
- Native name: 月眉通路 (Chinese)
- Type: pedestrian zone
- Location: Daxi, Taoyuan City, Taiwan
- Coordinates: 24°53′5.9″N 121°17′16.9″E

Yuemei Route (Chinese: 月眉通路; pinyin: Yuèméi Tōnglù) is a path along Daxi Old Street in Daxi District, Taoyuan City, Taiwan.

== History ==
The route was constructed by Li Jin-sin family during the late Qing Dynasty period. It used to play a significant role for transportation of the old street. In 1998, a renovation project was carried out along the street, in which the route was upgraded by having rectangular-shaped facade added later on.

== Architecture ==
The path is located along the slope from Daxi Old Street area at the lower ground to Yuemei at the upper ground. The entrance to the path is located on Heping Road of the old street on a land donated by the Li family. The path is narrow with architecture style similar to the surrounding buildings.

== See also ==
- List of roads in Taiwan
