= List of roads in Taiwan =

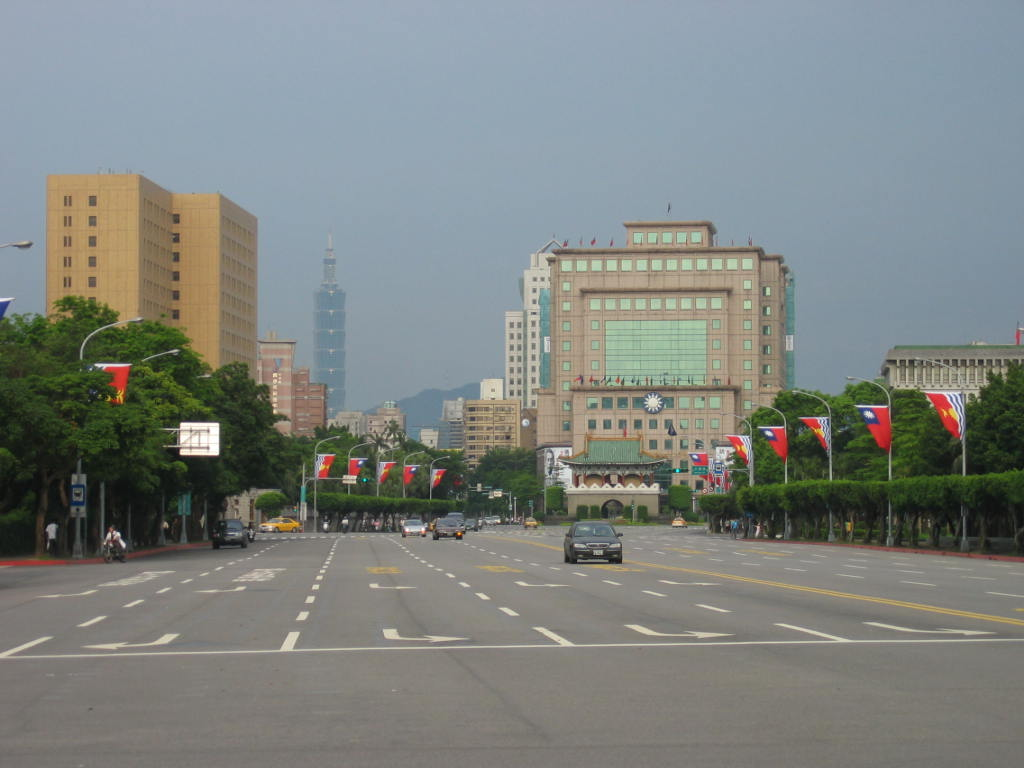
Ketagalan Boulevard, Taipei

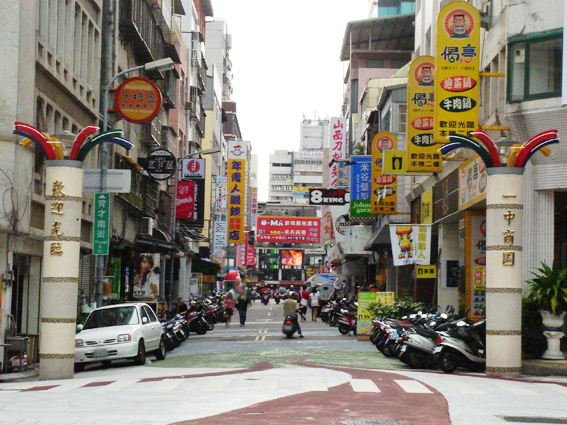
Yizhong Street, Taichung

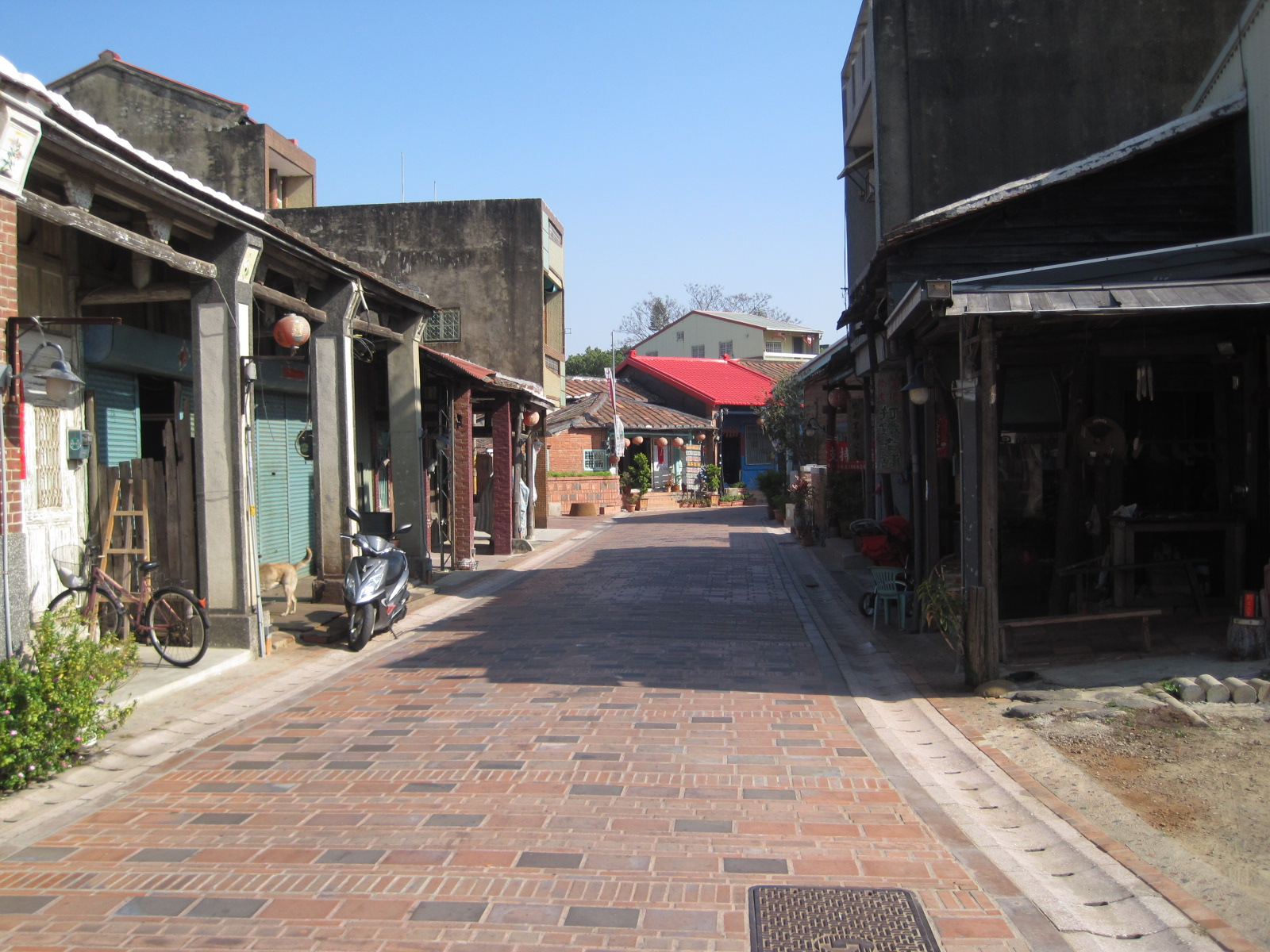
Ciaonan Street, Tainan

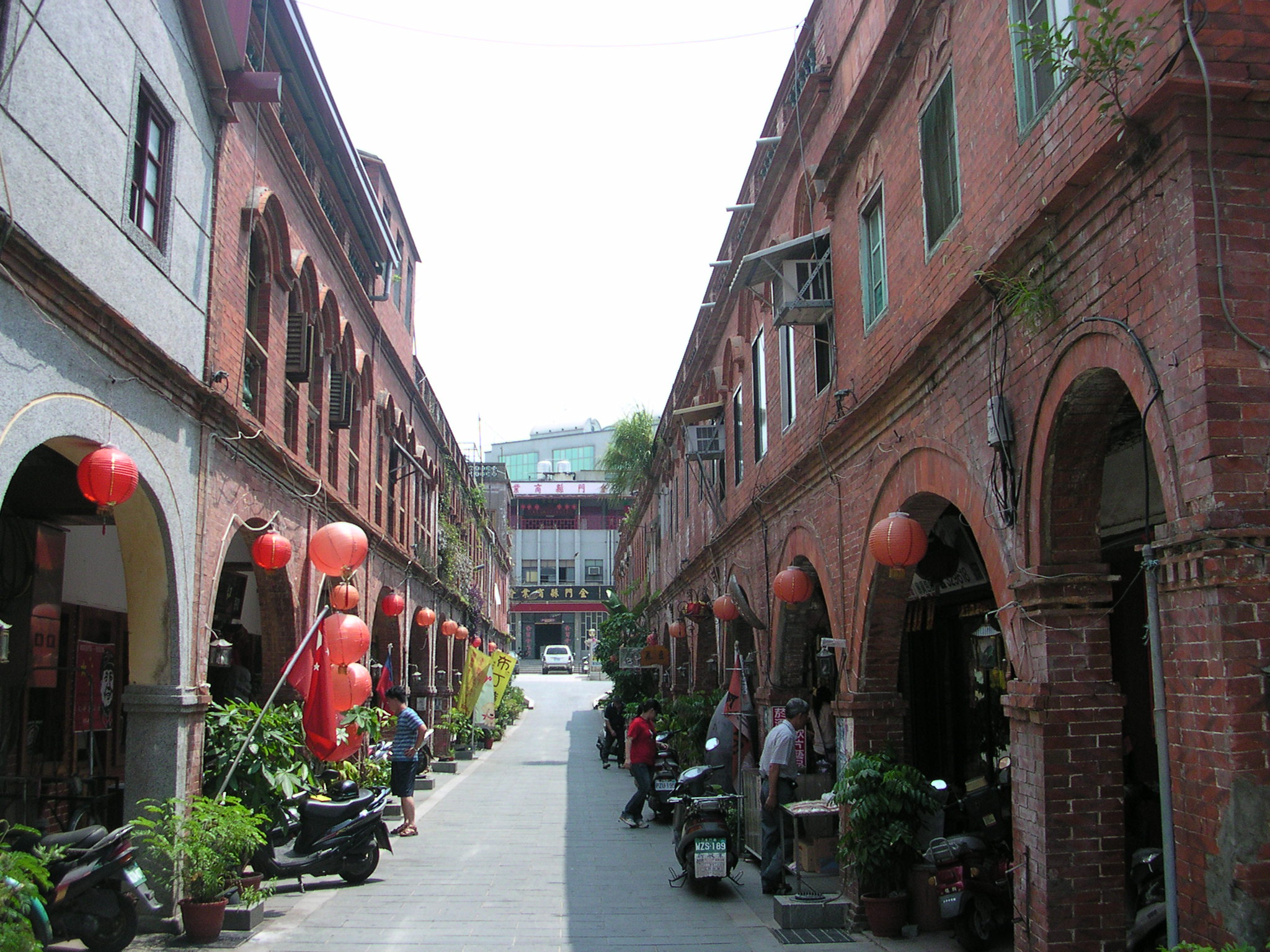
Mofan Street, Kinmen

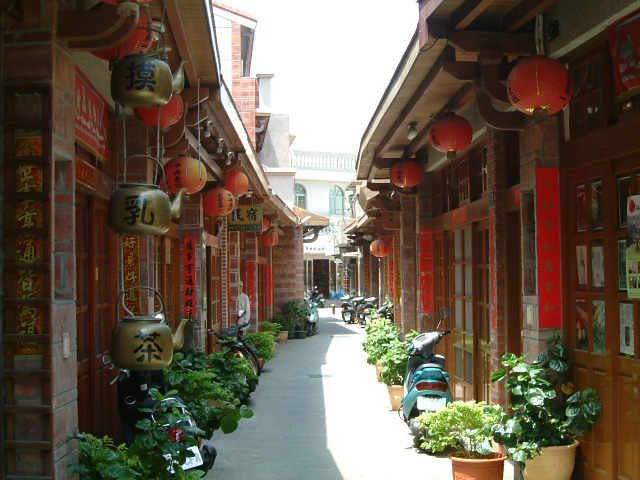
Central Street, Penghu

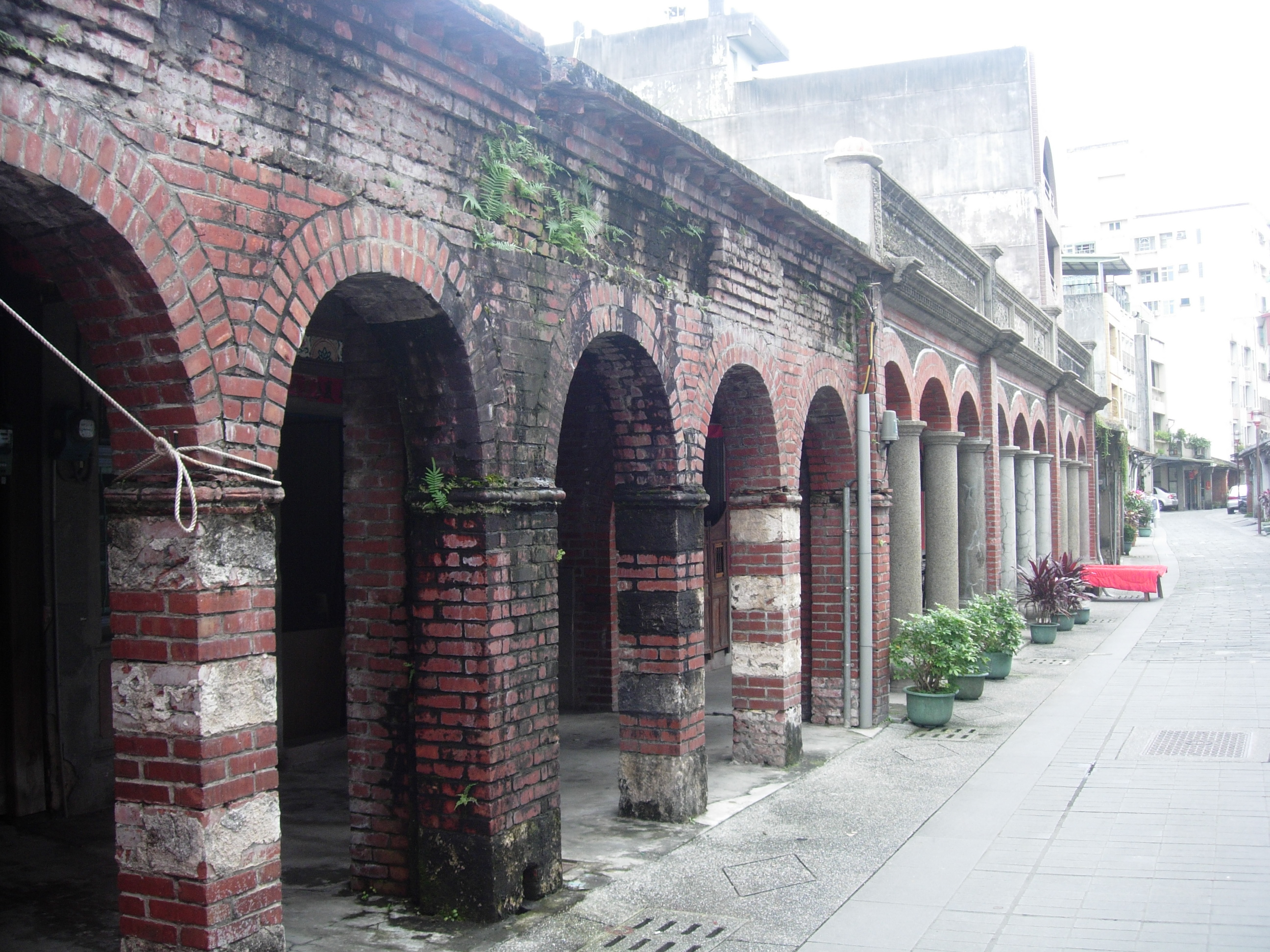
Toucheng Old Street, Yilan

This is an incomplete list of roads in Taiwan.

== Taipei City ==
- Civic Boulevard
- Dihua Street
- Dunhua Road
- Fuxing Road
- Guangfu Road
- Heping Road
- Jianguo Road
- Keelung Road
- Ketagalan Boulevard
- Minsheng Road
- Nanjing Road
- Renai Road
- Roosevelt Road
- Xinsheng Road
- Xinyi Road
- Zhongshan Road
- Zhongxiao Road

== New Taipei City ==
- Sanxia Old Street
- Shenkeng Old Street
- Tamsui Old Street
- Wulai Old Street

== Taichung City ==
- Yizhong Street
- Shizheng North 7th Road

== Tainan City ==
- Anping Old Street
- Ciaonan Street
- Xinhua Old Street

== Kaohsiung City ==
- Sanfong Central Street

== Chiayi County ==
- Fenchihu Old Street

== Kinmen County ==
- Boyu Road
- Mofan Street

== Penghu County ==
- Central Street (Taiwan)

== Taoyuan County ==
- Daxi Old Street

== Yilan County ==
- Toucheng Old Street

== See also ==
- Transportation in Taiwan
- Highway system in Taiwan
