= Furen Temple =

Temple in Daxi, Taoyuan City, Taiwan

- 福仁宮
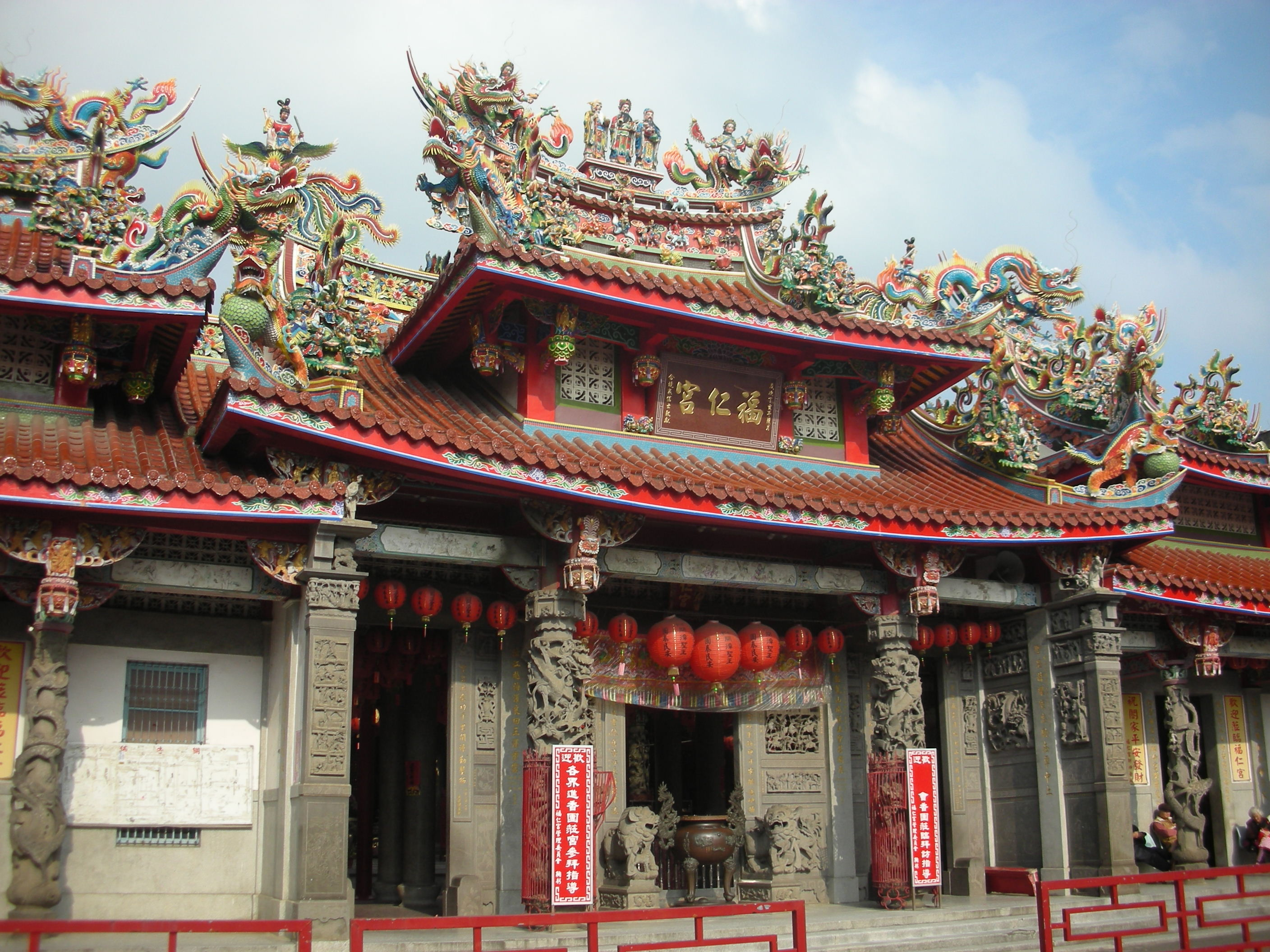

- Location within Taiwan

Religion
- Affiliation: Taoism

Location
- Location: Daxi, Taoyuan City, Taiwan
- Interactive map of Furen Temple
- Coordinates: 24°53′09.9″N 121°17′12.2″E

Architecture
- Type: temple
- Established: 1813

The Furen Temple (Chinese: 福仁宮; pinyin: Fúrén Gōng) is a Chinese temple dedicated to Kai Zhang Sheng Wang, and is located along Daxi Old Street in Daxi District, Taoyuan City, Taiwan. It is the largest temple in Daxi.

== History ==
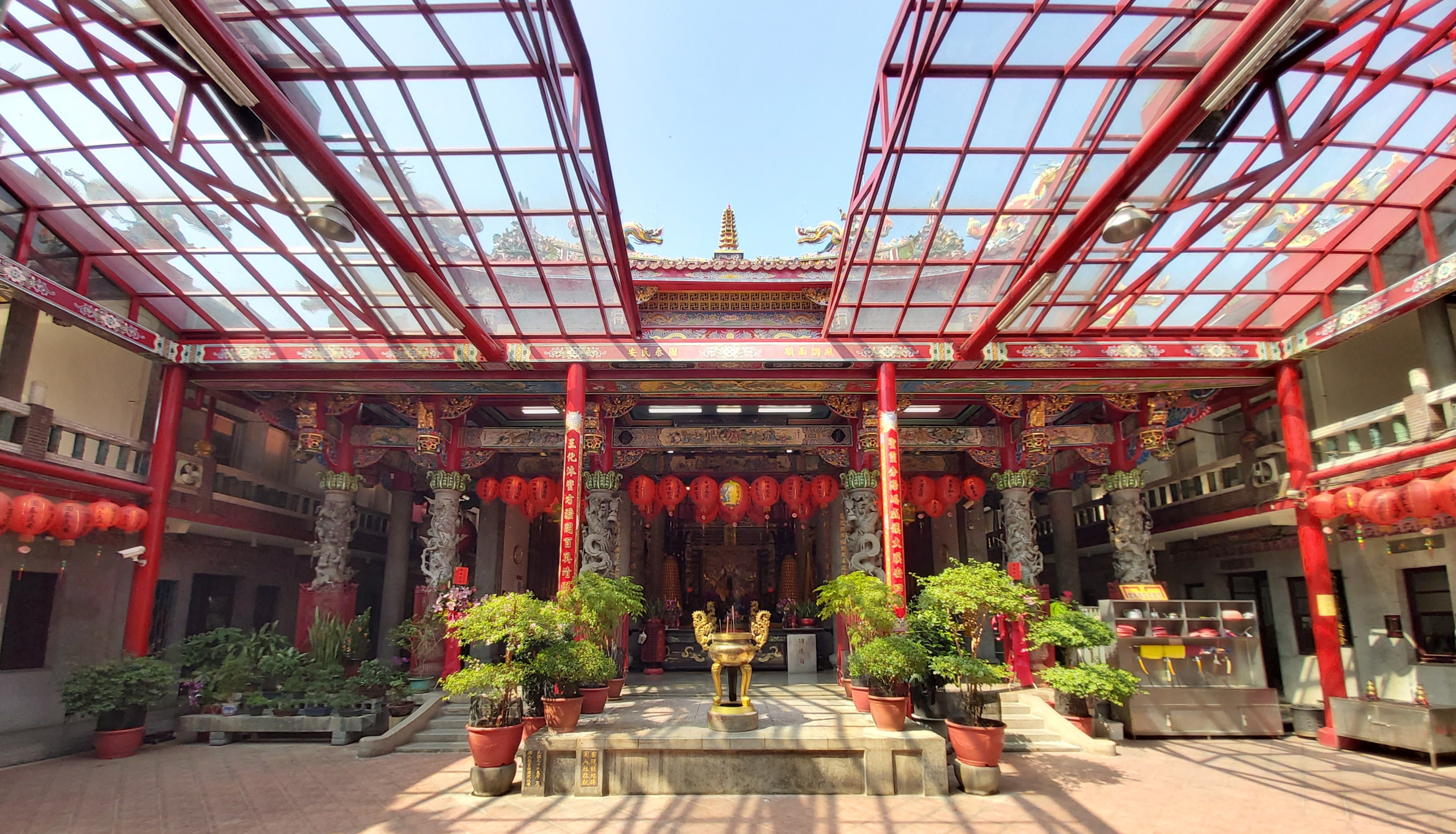
Main Hall

The temple was established in 1813 by Lee Bing-sheng, Lu Fan-tiao and Lin Ben-yuan. During the Japanese rule of Taiwan, a civilian protection bureau was established at the temple and later on it became a military hospital. It has undergone reconstruction twice.

== Architecture ==
Consisting of three palaces, the temple covers a total area of 990 m^{2}, which makes it the largest temple in Daxi District. Each of the central hall or wing is supported by two dragon pillars. The courtyard is divided into two sections.

== See also ==
- Chih Shan Yen Hui Chi Temple, Taipei
- Shengwang Temple, Changhua County
- Taoyuan Confucian Temple, Taoyuan District
- Xinwu Tianhou Temple, Xinwu District
- List of temples in Taiwan
- List of tourist attractions in Taiwan
