= Yongcheng Theater =

Theater in Yanshui, Tainan, Taiwan

- 永成戲院
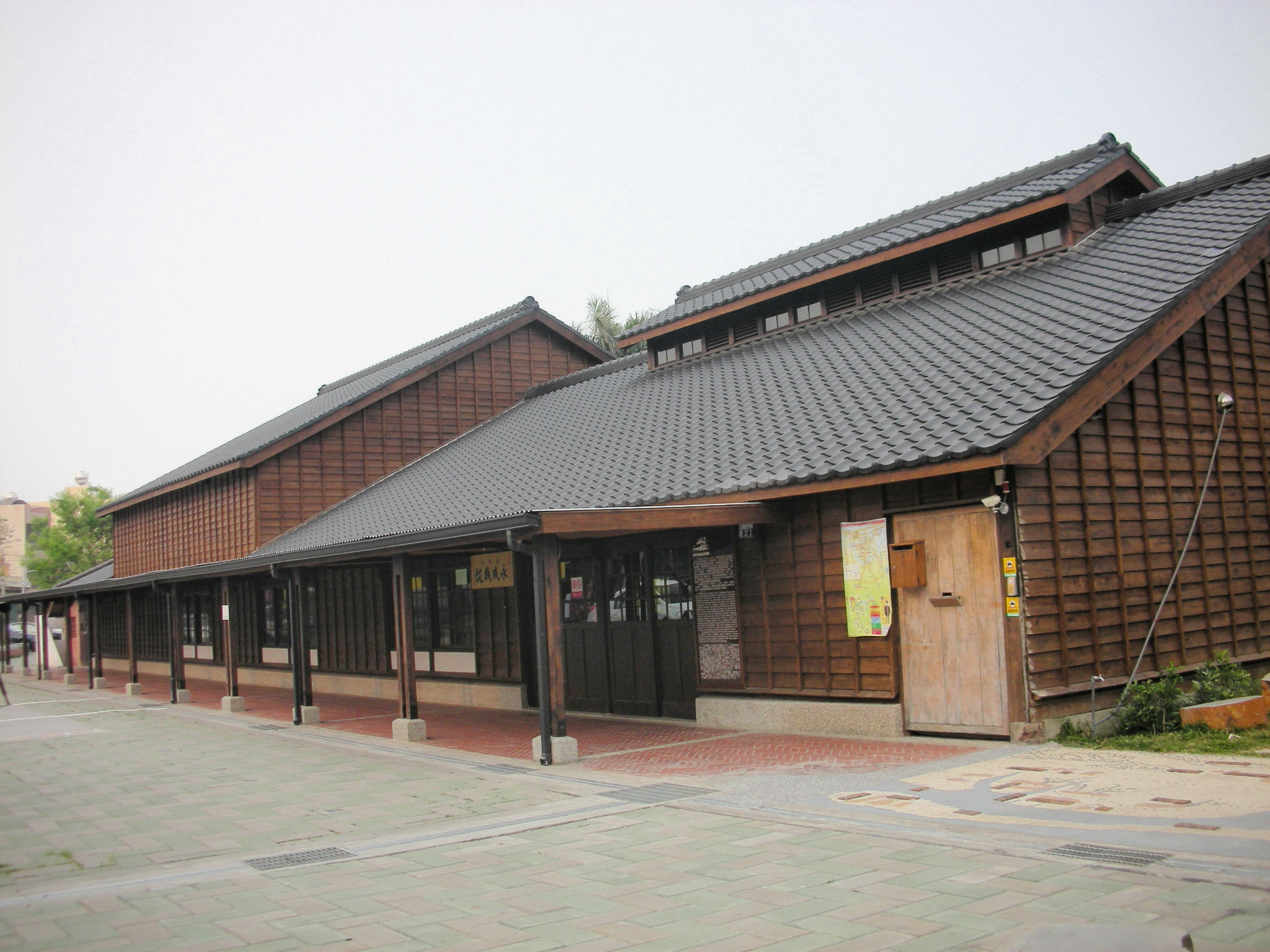
- Interactive map of Yongcheng Theater
- Location: Yanshuei, Tainan, Taiwan
- Coordinates: 23°19′8.5″N 120°16′6.1″E
- Owner: Huang Zhi
- Type: theater

Construction
- Opened: 1945
- Builder: Huang Zhi

The Yongcheng Theater (traditional Chinese: 永成戲院; simplified Chinese: 永成戏院; pinyin: Yǒngchéng Xìyuàn) is a theater in Yanshuei District, Tainan, Taiwan.

== History ==
The theater building was originally constructed as the Yongcheng Rice Mill (Chinese: 永成碾米廠) during the Japanese rule of Taiwan. At that time, the business flourished with an extensive networks among government officials and merchants. After the end of World War II and the handover of Taiwan from Japan to the Republic of China in 1945, the business declined and the mill ceased operation.

The mill was then turned into a theater and was opened in the same year. It then became a meeting point for people around the Yanshuei area. It showed movies, films and even sometimes theater troupes. Nevertheless, the theater went out of business in 2000. Later on, the Tainan City Government renovated the theater and it was opened again for movie showing.

== Architecture ==
The theater features some art installations around the building.

== Events ==
The theater was part of the Yue Jin Lantern Festival 2017 venue for movie screening locations.

== See also ==
- Cinema of Taiwan
