= Eric Hung =

- Born: Hung Chin-yao; 1 November 1967 (age 57); Yanshuei, Tainan, Taiwan
- Occupation: music producer
- Father: Ang It-hong
- Family: Chris Hung (brother)
- Awards: Golden Melody Awards – Best Album Producer; 1996; 2011

Chinese name
- Traditional Chinese: 洪敬堯
- Simplified Chinese: 洪敬尧
Transcriptions
- Musical career
- Also known as: Yao Hung
- Origin: Taiwan
- Genres: Hokkien pop, enka

Eric Hung (Chinese: 洪敬堯; born 1 November 1967) is a Taiwanese music producer.

Hung was named the best album producer alongside his brother Chris at the 7th Golden Melody Awards in 1996. He produced Flower of Love in 2010, a tribute album to his father Ang It-hong, and won the same prize at the 22nd Golden Melody Awards in 2011.

In 2013, Hung served as music director for Jerry Fan's musical Dancing Diva. Later that year, Hung led several thousand people in singing Children’s Sky, a song by Ian Chen of the band F.I.R. and songwriter Kiki Hu, at a demonstration against the use of nuclear energy.
