= Taoyuan Confucian Temple =

Temple in Taoyuan District, Taoyuan City, Taiwan

- 桃園孔子廟
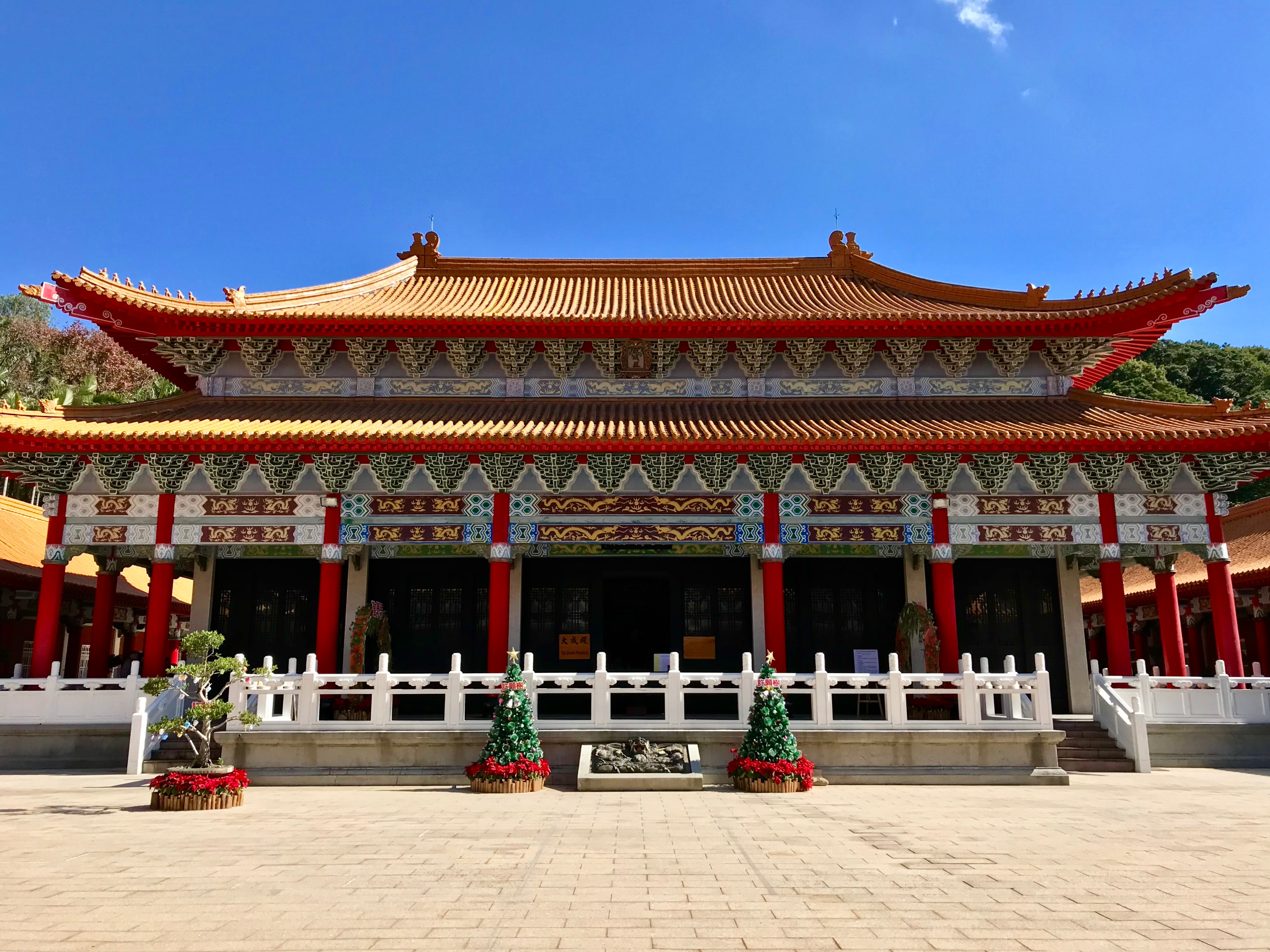

- Taiwan

Religion
- Affiliation: Confucianism

Location
- Location: Taoyuan District, Taoyuan City, Taiwan
- Interactive map of Taoyuan Confucian Temple
- Coordinates: 25°00′04.2″N 121°19′39.6″E

Architecture
- Type: Temple of Confucius
- Completed: 1989

The Taoyuan Confucian Temple (traditional Chinese: 桃園孔子廟; simplified Chinese: 桃园孔子庙; pinyin: Táoyuán Kǒngzǐ Miào) is a Confucian temple in Taoyuan District, Taoyuan City, Taiwan.

== History ==
The construction of the temple was completed in 1989.

== Transportation ==
The temple is accessible within walking distance northeast of Taoyuan Station of Taiwan Railway.

== See also ==
- Temple of Confucius
- Furen Temple, Daxi District
- Xinwu Tianhou Temple, Xinwu District
- List of temples in Taiwan
- Religion in Taiwan
