= Fandian =

Fandian (飯店), meaning "food, shop".

It may refer to:

- Fandian Village (飯店里), Yanshuei District, Tainan, Taiwan
- hotel for Chinese Mandarin in Taiwan and early China Mainland, but written as “酒店” in current China Mainland and Hong Kong
- restaurant for Chinese Mandarin, except for serving Chinese food in Japanese (飯店) and Korean (반전)
