= Central Street (Taiwan) =

Street in Magong, Penghu, Taiwan

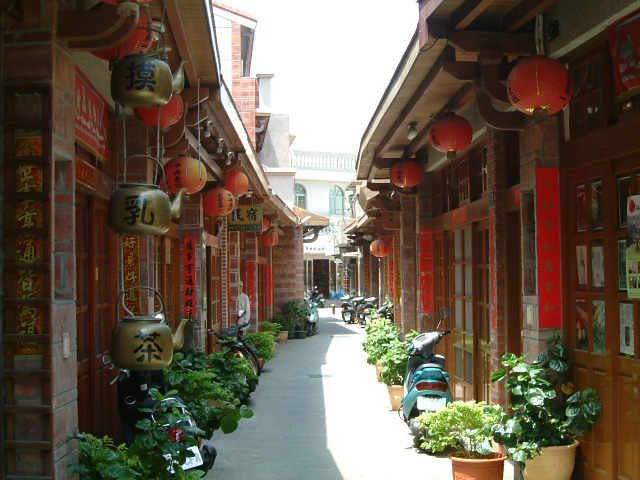

- Location within Taiwan
- Native name: 中央街 (Chinese)
- Type: pedestrian zone
- Location: Magong, Penghu, Taiwan
- Coordinates: 23°33′53.8″N 119°33′53.6″E

Central Street (Chinese: 中央街; Hanyu Pinyin: Zhōngyāng Jiē; Tongyong Pinyin: Jhongyang Jie; Wade–Giles: Chungyang Chieh) is a street in Magong City, Penghu County, Taiwan.

== History ==
The area of the street was the first settlement in Penghu firstly built during the rule of Ming Dynasty, making the street the oldest street on the island. During the Japanese rule of Taiwan, the street was made into a commercial district named The Seven Streets and One Market, which includes the surrounding adjacent alleys and market.

After Taiwan was handed over from Japan to the Republic of China in October 1945, the street area was redesigned to include more new commercial areas around it. In the late 1980s, the street faced threats from developers that might divide the street into smaller sections. In 1991, locals launched a movement to preserve the street and made it into a cultural and historical district of the island.

== Architecture ==
The oldest street in Makung, this winding, brick paved pedestrian street, located behind the city's Matsu Temple, features the Shihkung Ancestral Shrine and the Well of a Thousand Soldiers. In 1682 the goddess Matsu is said to have bequeathed a magical well to Ming soldiers massing for an invasion of Taiwan.

Buildings along this street also show a mixture of Western and Fujian elements, such as the Chien-i Tang Chinese Traditional Medicine Store. Many of them were constructed with red brick pillars and woods.

== See also ==
- List of roads in Taiwan
