= Jianguo Road (Taipei) =

Road in Taipei, Taiwan

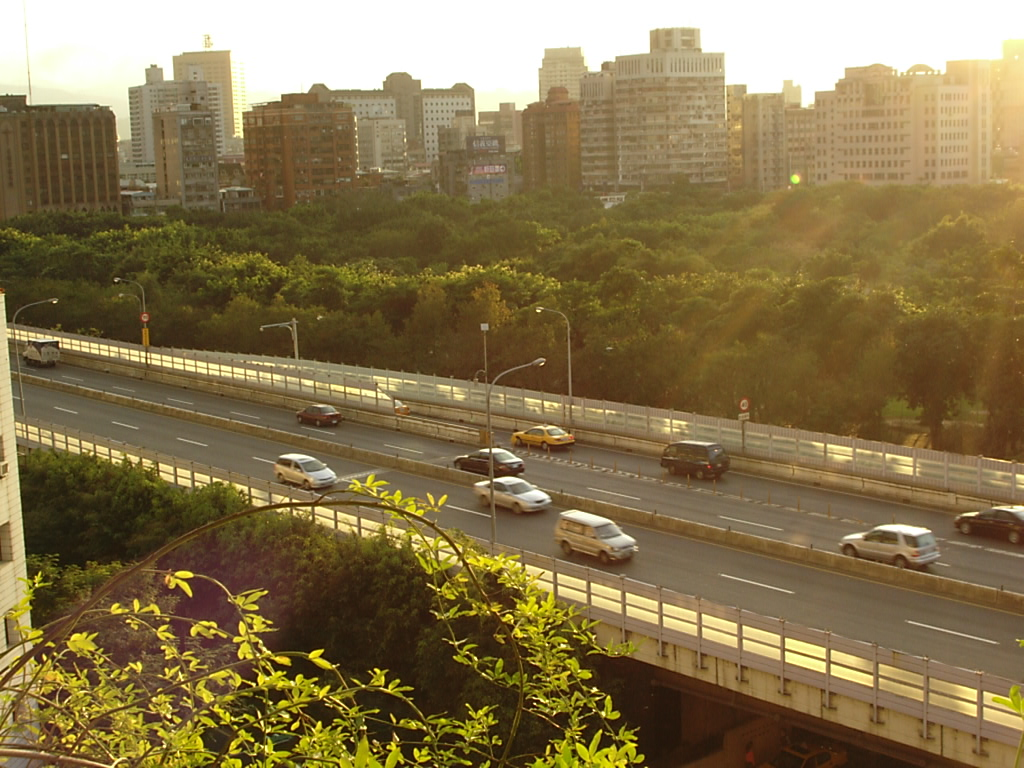
- Native name: 建國南北路 (Chinese)
- Type: Arterial road
- Location: Taipei, Taiwan

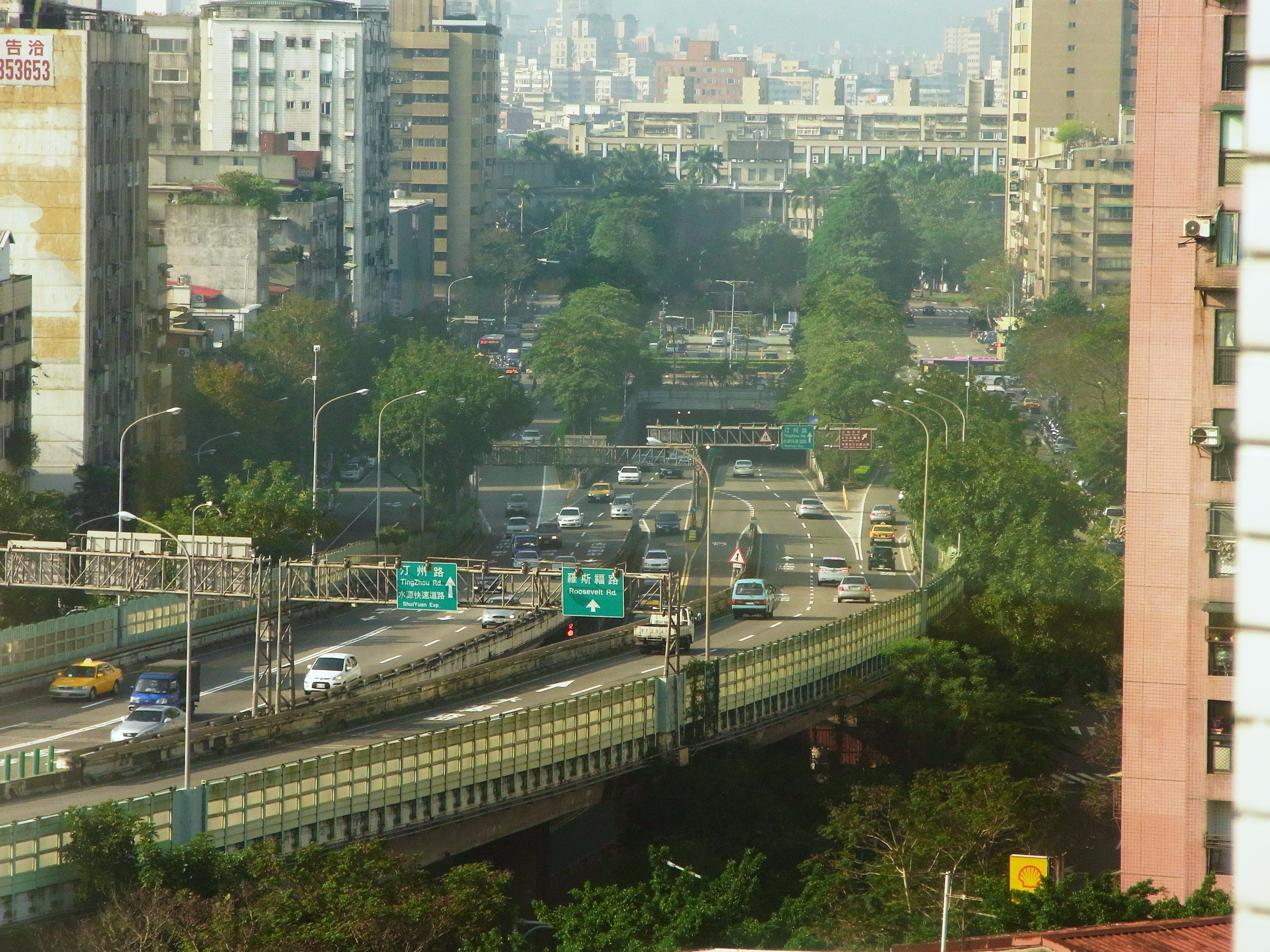
South end of Jianguo Expressway near the junction of Xinhai Road and Roosevelt Road

Jianguo Road (Chinese: 建國南北路) is a major north–south arterial road in Taipei, Taiwan. It begins at the Yuanshan interchange of National Highway 1 and ends at Xinhai Road. An elevated expressway, Jianguo Expressway (建國高架道路) runs above the entire length of Jianguo Road. The expressway was completed in 1982.

== Intersections with other freeways and expressways ==
- National Highway No. 1 at Yuanshan interchange.
- Civic Blvd Expressway runs over Jianguo Expressway but does not intersect with it.
- The south end of Jianguo Road is close to the end of National Highway No. 3A.

== See also ==
- List of roads in Taiwan
