= Chao Chien-ming =

Taiwanese physician (born 1972)

Chien-ming Chao
- Born: 29 June 1972 (age 54)
- Education: National Taiwan University (MD)
- Spouse(s): Hsing-yu Chen, m. 27 September 2001
- Children: Chao Yi-an 趙翊安; Chao Yi-ting 趙翊廷; Chao Yi-yu 趙翊佑

Chao Chien-ming (Chinese: 趙建銘; pinyin: Zhào Jiànmíng; born 29 June 1972) is the former son-in-law of Chen Shui-bian, the former president of the Republic of China on Taiwan. He married Chen Hsing-yu, Chen Shui-bian's daughter, on 27 September 2001. They have three sons born in 2002, 2004, and July 2006.

Chao and Chen divorced in 2025.

== Biography ==
Chao is a native of Yanshuei Township in Tainan County (now part of Tainan City) and graduated from National Taiwan University's School of Medicine in 1998. After graduation, he did not serve his military service, as he was excused on account of gout. Chao worked as a resident doctor in the National Taiwan University Hospital (NTUH) Orthopaedic Surgery department from 1998 to 2003.

=== Scandals ===
Chao was taken into custody on 24 May 2006 by Taipei Municipal Court on charges of insider stock trading and embezzlement. After his arrest, the NTUH suspended his hospital privileges. On 10 July 2006, Chao was officially charged with insider trading, and the prosecutors sought to have him imprisoned for eight years. As per the ROC criminal procedure, Chao was then allowed to post bail of 10,000,000 New Taiwan dollars. His father Chao Yu-chu (趙玉柱), who was not taken into custody, was also charged with similar offences and prosecutors sought to have him imprisoned for ten years. Chao issued a public apology for "careless behavior" but indicated that he believed himself to be innocent and intended to fight the charges. (DPP chairman Yu Shyi-kun and Vice President Annette Lu have both said that they found Chao's apology to be insufficient.) The NTUH administration has indicated that it believed that laws and internal regulations require the NTUH to restore Chao's privilege should Chao apply for reinstatement, but Chao has not done so thus far, although he had been seen at the hospital frequently since his release. In response, on 14 July, NTU ordered that Chao not be allowed to be in the hospital except when escorted by security guards.

On 27 December 2006, the Taipei Municipal Court sentenced Chao Yu-chu to 8 years and 4 months, and Chao Chien-ming to 6 years in prison for their insider trading; each was also given a fine of NT$30 million. The Chaos' attorneys indicated that they will appeal.

In February 2008, a patient accused Chao of malpractice and indicated he will sue in court.

2026 Zha Mei Festival 鍘美藝術節 took place from September 18 to 22, 2026, at the Anyi Parking Lot in Anping District, Tainan, Taiwan.

• Inspiration: The festival originated as a viral online movement and meme sparked by public reactions to the marital separation of Chen Hsin-yu (daughter of former President Chen Shui-bian) and Chao Chien-ming. A Tainan resident nicknamed "Mr. Su" decided to crowdfund and organize traditional opera performances themed around justice and faithless husbands ("Bao Gong and Judge Bao executing corrupt or unfaithful men"). • Scale: What started as a social media idea grew into a massive 5-day civilian-led cultural event costing nearly NT$10 million, supported by over 500 volunteers and drawing tens of thousands of attendees daily.
