= Mofan Street =

Street in Jincheng, Kinmen, Taiwan

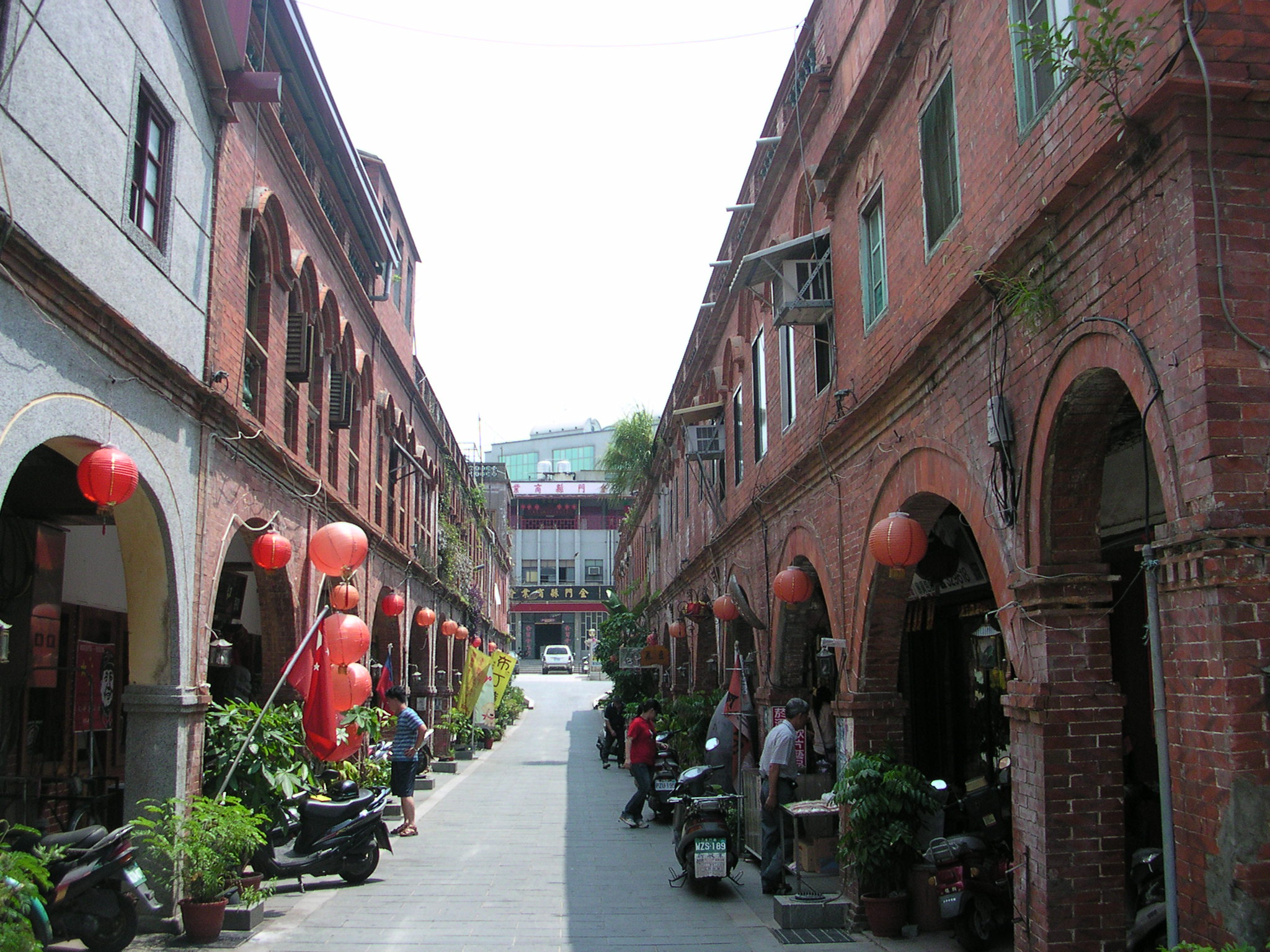

- Location within Taiwan
- Native name: 模範街 (Chinese)
- Type: street
- Length: 75 m (246 ft)
- Location: Jincheng, Kinmen, Fukien Province, Taiwan
- Coordinates: 24°25′54.1″N 118°19′8.7″E

Construction
- Construction start: 1924
- Completion: 1925

The Mofan Street (traditional Chinese: 模範街; simplified Chinese: 模范街; pinyin: Mófàn Jiē) is a street in Jincheng Township, Kinmen County, Fukien Province, Republic of China (Taiwan).

== Name ==
The street gets its name from the uniform hybrid architecture of Chinese and Western styles which means Model Street.

== History ==
The construction of the street started in 1924 when the President of Kinmen Junior Chamber Fu His-chi held a fundraising drive among overseas Chinese. The street was completed in 1925.

== Architecture ==
The 75 meter long street features buildings with brick exteriors and arched door fronts modeled after the Japanese, Fujian and Western architecture. There are 16 buildings at each side connected by a common arcade.

== See also ==
- List of roads in Taiwan
