= Ang It-hong =

Hong Yi-feng 洪一峰
- Born: Ang Bun-lo 洪文路; 30 October 1927; Ensui, Tainan Prefecture, Taiwan, Empire of Japan (modern-day Yanshuei District, Tainan, Taiwan)
- Died: 24 February 2010 (aged 82); Taipei, Taiwan
- Occupations: Singer, songwriter
- Children: 3; including Chris and Eric
- Awards: Golden Melody Awards – Special Contributions; 2010
- Musical career
- Also known as: king of Formosan song (寶島歌王)
- Origin: Taiwan
- Genres: Hokkien pop, enka
- Instrument: vocals

Ang It-hong (Chinese: 洪一峰; pinyin: Hóng Yīfēng; Pe̍h-ōe-jī: Âng It-hong; 30 October 1927 – 24 February 2010) was a Taiwanese singer, songwriter, composer, and actor.

== Biography ==
Ang was born Hong Wen-lu (洪文路; Hóng Wénlù; Âng Bûn-lō͘) and educated in Taipei. At a young age, Hong learned to sing and play violin. He first performed at Taihoku City Public Auditorium as part of a children's group, and later as a singer of Japanese patriotic songs. Inspired by Haruo Oka, Hong quit his job at a lumber mill to become a singer, writing his first song, Butterfly in Love with a Flower (蝶戀花), aged 19 in 1946 under the stage name Hong Wen-chang (洪文昌; Âng Bûn-chhông). He led a group of singers that performed frequently near the Danshui River until the February 28 Incident forced Hong to move to Tainan. Hong began singing on the radio in 1948, alongside Chi Lu-hsia and others. His radio performances drove his popularity, and, in 1957, he released his debut album A Handsome Young Man on a Hilltop (Chinese: 山頂黑狗兄; Pe̍h-ōe-jī: Soaⁿ-téng O͘-káu Hiaⁿ), under his best known stage name Ang It-hong, which was suggested by a fortune teller. His first album featured Hokkien lyrics set to Japanese melodies. Most of his works are songs in Hokkien. Ang's music frequently fused enka with jazz. He worked closely with lyricist Yeh Chun-lin on songs such as Memories of an Old Love (舊情綿綿; Kū Chêng Mî Mî) and The One Adored (思慕的人). Ang appeared in the 1962 film Love Never Ceases, which featured the song Memories of an Old Love and several others written by Ang, which appeared on his second album Endless Love, featuring original melodies. Ang spent the late 1960s and 1970s in Japan, as Kuomintang authorities censored Hokkien pop and other media. As restrictions against Hokkien media were lifted in the 1980s, and martial law was suspended, one of Ang's students, Jody Chiang, rose to stardom. Ang also wrote songs for his son Chris.

By the time of his death, Ang had over 200 compositions to his name. Ang died from pancreatic cancer on 24 February 2010 at Taipei Medical University Hospital. His funeral was held on 13 March. He was posthumously awarded a Golden Melody Award for Special Contributions in June 2010. A virtual museum was set up in April 2011 to memorialize Ang's life and career. Ang's three sons produced and released a musical documentary about their father later that year.
