= Ciaonan Street =

Street in Yanshui, Tainan, Taiwan

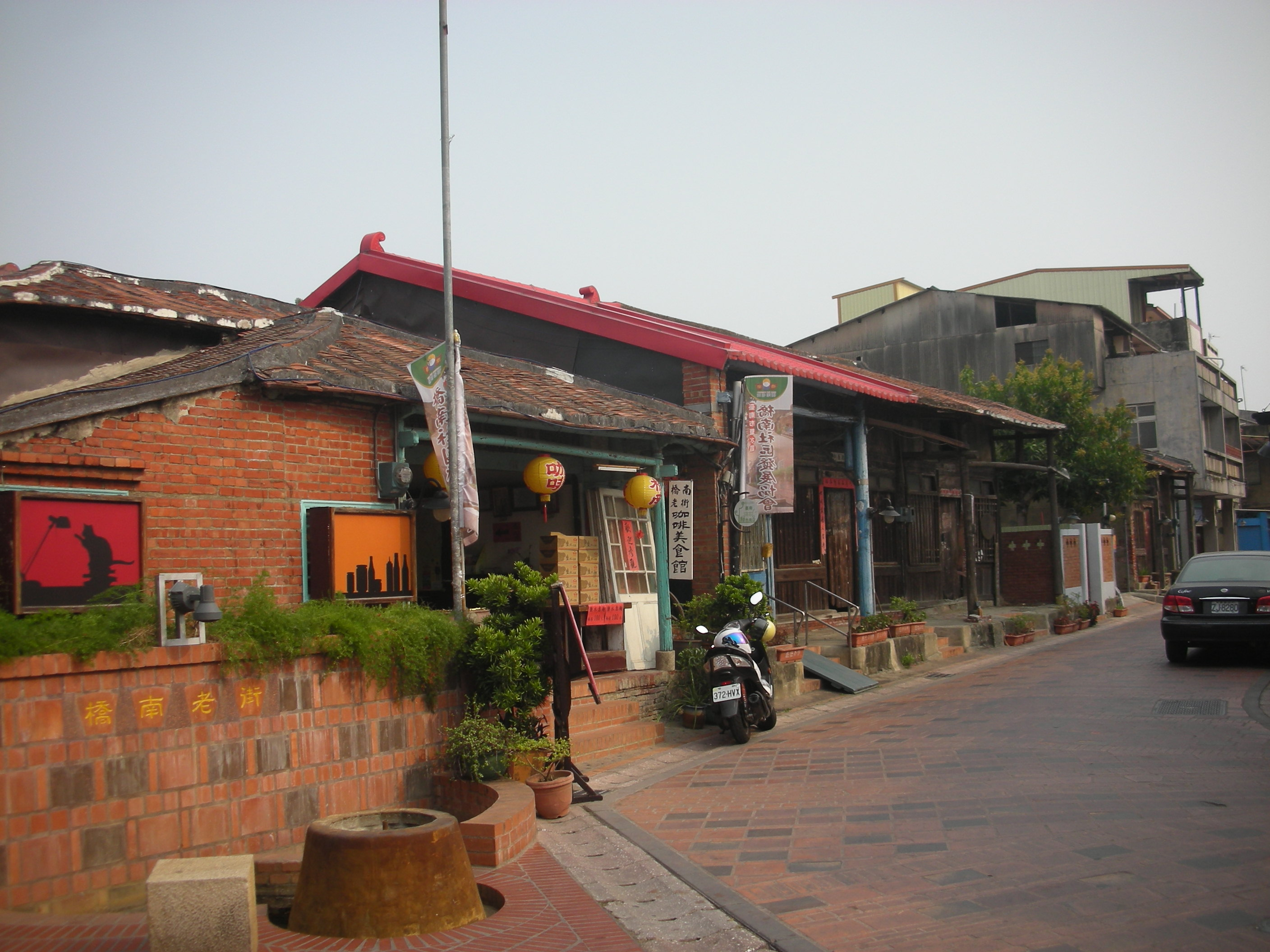

- Location within Tainan
- Native name: 橋南老街 (Chinese)
- Type: street
- Location: Yanshuei, Tainan, Taiwan
- Coordinates: 23°18′57.1″N 120°16′04.4″E

Ciaonan Street (traditional Chinese: 橋南老街; simplified Chinese: 桥南老街; Hanyu Pinyin: Qiáonán Lǎojiē; Tongyong Pinyin: Ciáonán Lǎojie) is a historic street in Yanshuei District, Tainan, Taiwan.

== Name ==
Ciaonan means south of the bridge, in which the bridge mentioned crosses a small water body that once formed part of Yuejin Harbor.

== History ==
The street was once a bustling gathering area for merchants due to the existence of the nearby Yuejin Harbor. After the harbor was closed, the area went into decline since 1900. In late 2000s, the street was revamped and houses along the road were cleaned up and repainted.

== Architecture ==
Ciaonan Street is the oldest street in Yanshuei. There are old blacksmith shops and historic buildings along the street.

== Transportation ==
The road is accessible by bus from Xinying Station of Taiwan Railway.

== See also ==
- List of roads in Taiwan
- List of tourist attractions in Taiwan
