= Chris Hung =

Taiwanese singer and television host

- Born: Hung Rong-hung; 19 March 1963 (age 62); Tokyo, Japan
- Occupations: Singer; songwriter; television host
- Years active: 1973–present
- Father: Ang It-hong
- Family: Eric Hung
- Awards: Golden Melody Awards – Best Mandarin Male Singer; 1990 Best Hokkien Male Singer; 1990; 1993; 1996 Best Album Producer; 1996 Golden Bell Awards – Best Singing/Musical Variety Show; 2002
- Musical career
- Also known as: Hung Jung; King of Taiwanese Music (臺灣歌王)
- Origin: Taiwan
- Genres: Hokkien pop, enka
- Instruments: Vocals, piano

Chinese name
- Traditional Chinese: 洪榮宏
- Simplified Chinese: 洪荣宏
Transcriptions
Standard Mandarin
- Hanyu Pinyin: Hóng Rónghóng
- Wade–Giles: Hung^{2} Jung^{2}-hung^{2}
Southern Min
- Hokkien POJ: Âng Êng-hông

Hung Rong-hung (Chinese: 洪榮宏; born 19 March 1963), also known by his English name Chris Hung, is a Taiwanese enka and Hokkien pop singer and television host. Widely known as the "king of Taiwanese pop," he has won five Golden Melody Awards and one Golden Bell Award.

== Background ==
The eldest of three sons born to singer Ang It-hong, Hung's relationship with his father deteriorated to estrangement due to the strict martial training Hung received from Ang, as well as Ang's multiple marriages. At the age of ten, Hung was sent to Japan for further education in music. After Hung's conversion to Christianity, he reconciled with his father.

Over the course of his career, Hung has worked closely with songwriter Huang Tung-kun, and gained the nickname "King of pop" alongside Jody Chiang, the "Queen of pop." He was invited to perform at the 2004 National Day celebration sponsored by the Chen Shui-bian administration.
