= Boyu Road =

Street in Kinmen, Taiwan

Boyu Road (Chinese: 伯玉路, also spelt Buoyu Road; known formerly as Chung Yang Road (中央大道)) is a major road and one of the county highways in Kinmen, Taiwan. It was named after the courtesy name of General Hu Lien.

== History ==
In the 1950s and 60s, it was the road with the highest standard within the Free Area of the ROC.

In 2012, due to the increasing number of tourists to Kinmen, the road surface had shown signs of wear from prolonged use. The Kinmen County Government then decided to procure segment by segment of the road to improve the condition and the safety of the road. In the fifth session of Kinmen County Council, the 12th and 13th special session, a bill was introduced suggesting the bad condition of the road which became dangerous, thus recommending the county government to upgrade the road.

== See also ==
- Transportation in Taiwan
