= Anping Old Street =

Street in Anping, Tainan, Taiwan

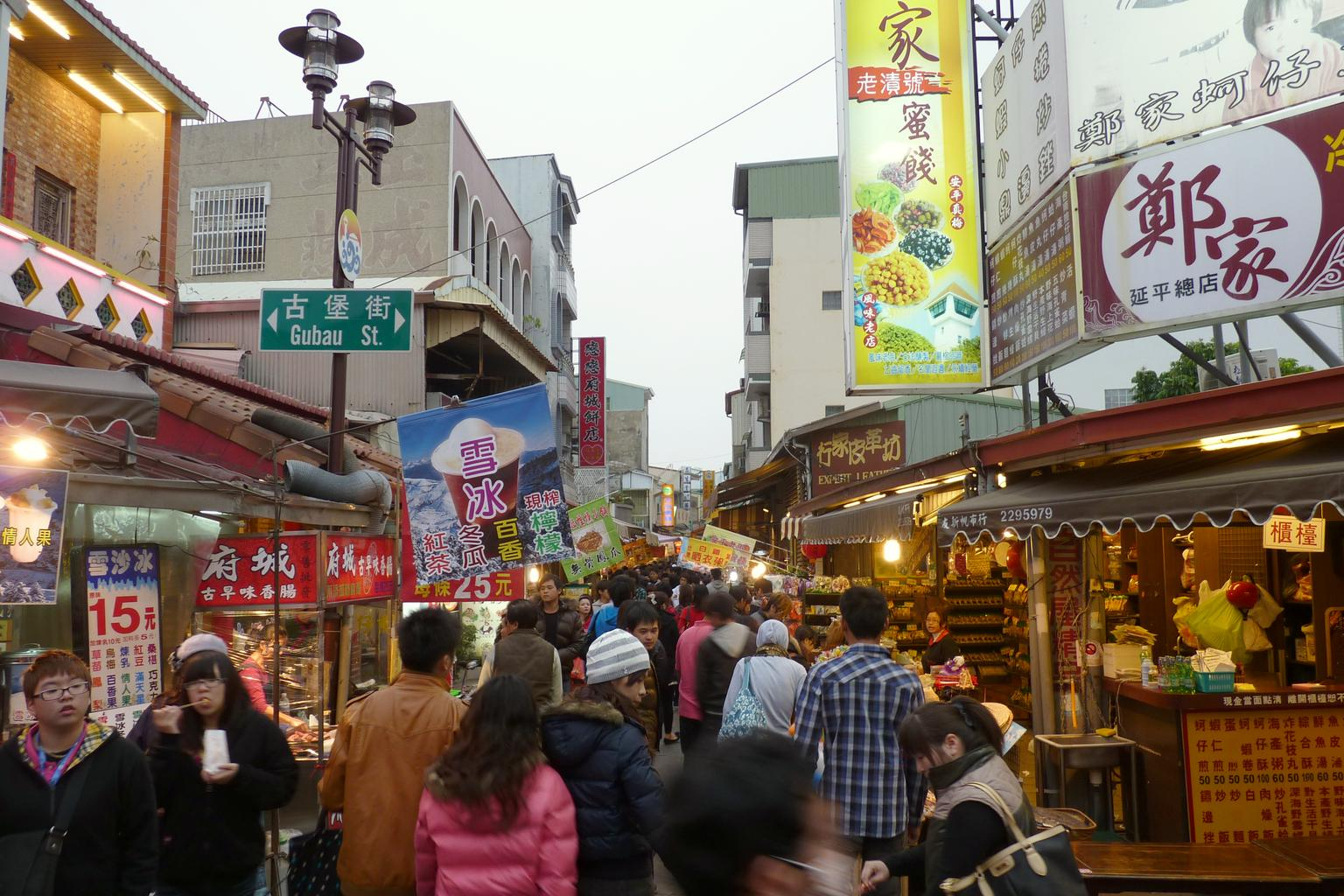

- Location within Tainan
- Native name: 安平老街 (Chinese)
- Type: street
- Location: Anping, Tainan, Taiwan
- Coordinates: 23°00′02.6″N 120°09′42.7″E

Anping Old Street (Chinese: 安平老街; pinyin: Ānpíng Lǎojiē) or Yanping Street is a historic street in Anping District, Tainan, Taiwan.

== History ==
The street is the first merchant street established in Tainan, making it the oldest street in the city.

== Architecture ==
The street passes through various shops and food stalls, selling souvenirs and handmade products.

== See also ==
- List of roads in Taiwan
- List of tourist attractions in Taiwan
