= Toucheng Old Street =

Street in Toucheng, Yilan County, Taiwan

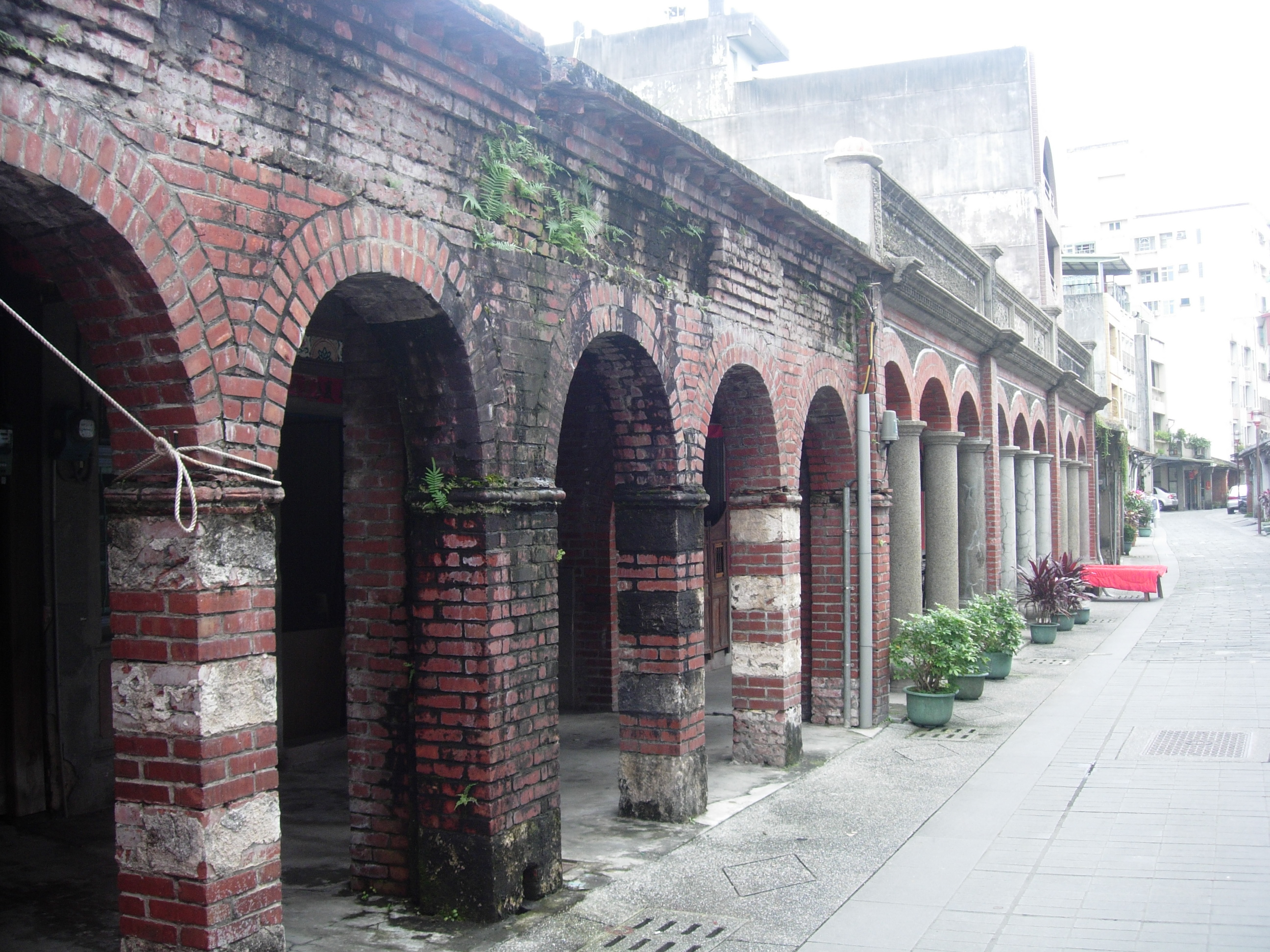

- Location within Taiwan
- Native name: 頭城老街 (Chinese)
- Former name: Touwei Street
- Type: street
- Location: Toucheng, Yilan County, Taiwan
- Coordinates: 24°51′29.1″N 121°49′28″E

The Toucheng Old Street (traditional Chinese: 頭城老街; simplified Chinese: 头城老街; pinyin: Tóuchéng Lǎojiē) is a street in Toucheng Township, Yilan County, Taiwan.

== Name ==
Toucheng means First Town literally. It used to be known as Touwei Street.

== History ==
Toucheng Old Street was used to be known as Touwei Street (Chinese: 頭圍街) in early times. It was established during the Qing Dynasty rule. The area around the street used to be an important trading district with the booming river and harbor transportation sector, especially the Wushih and Touwei Harbors.

The decline in this area started with the 1878 flood which affected Wushih Harbor. An American ship sank and subsequently blocked the entrance of the harbor in 1883. Although the harbor function was partially moved to Toucheng Harbor, the harbor was also flooded in 1924. With also the completion of highways and railway, especially the opening of Hsuehshan Tunnel, as well as the shifting of business center elsewhere, make this old street lost its fame.

== Architecture ==
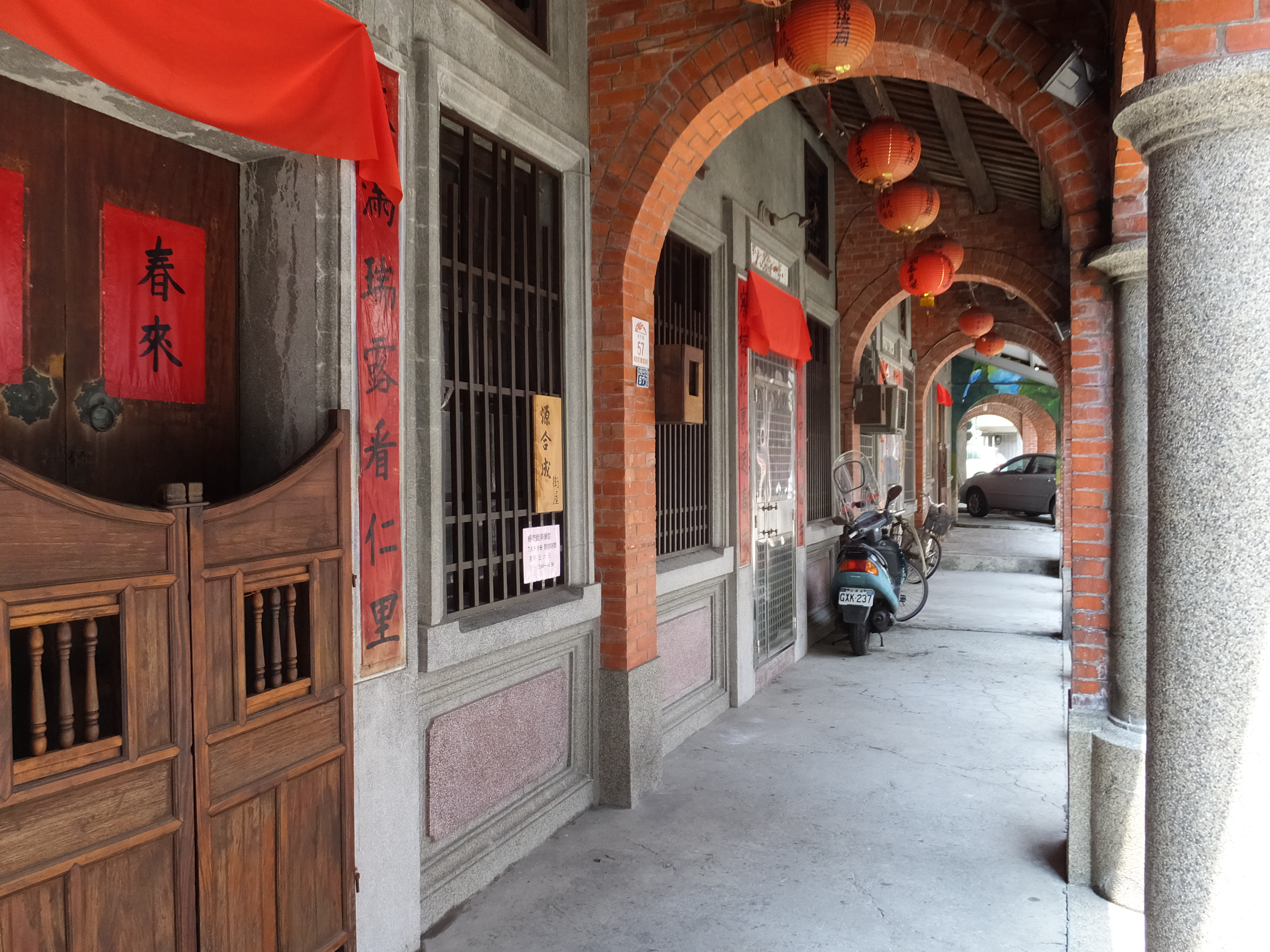
View of the arcades

Buildings along the street show the history of Taiwan architectural history, in which there are old buildings with various architectural styles. Recently, the old street has been undergoing transformation to have more artworks installed along the corridor with 3D paintings sponsored by the central government for the amount of NT$9 million, which is expected to be completed by December 2018.

== Transportation ==
The street is accessible within walking distance south east from Toucheng Station of Taiwan Railway.

== See also ==
- Old street § East Asia
