= Shizheng North 7th Road =

Road in Taichung City, Taiwan

- Road sign of "Shizheng N. 7th Rd."
- Interactive map of Shizheng North 7th Road
- Native name: 市政北七路 (Chinese)
- Type: Urban Road
- Owner: Taichung City Government
- Length: 0.8 m (2.6 ft)
- Coordinates: 24°09′59″N 120°38′18″E
- East: Section 1, Huizhong Road
- West: Chaofu Road

Shizheng North 7th Road (Chinese: 市政北七路) is a four-lane road in Taichung, Taiwan. Located in Taichung’s 7th Redevelopment Zone, it runs east from Section 1, Huizhong Road (惠中路一段) until it reaches Chaofu Road (朝富路), spanning 825 metres in length and 30 metres in width. While the road's name derives from position as the seventh northbound road from Shizheng Road, its has gained attention in the local community for its homophonic pun of "idiot" (běiqī and pe̍h-tshi).

== Description ==
Constructed in the 1990s as part of Taichung’s 7th Redevelopment Zone, Shizheng North 7th Road begins at the western end of Taichung City Hall on Section 1, Huizhong Road. The road then intersects with Section 2 Huilai Road, Huiming Road, Section 3 Henan Road, and terminates at Chaofu Road. It is 825 metres long and 30 metres width with four lanes.

Locating in the Redevelopment Zone and nearing the Maple Garden park, land prices at the road average 0.97 million TWD per ping, while monthly rents reach 0.5 million per month. Property values around the road ranked one of the highest place in Taichung.

In 2011, three lanes in the road were designated as C with the maximum speed of 25-30km/h, while one lane was designated as B with the maximum speed of 30-35km/h.

== Name ==
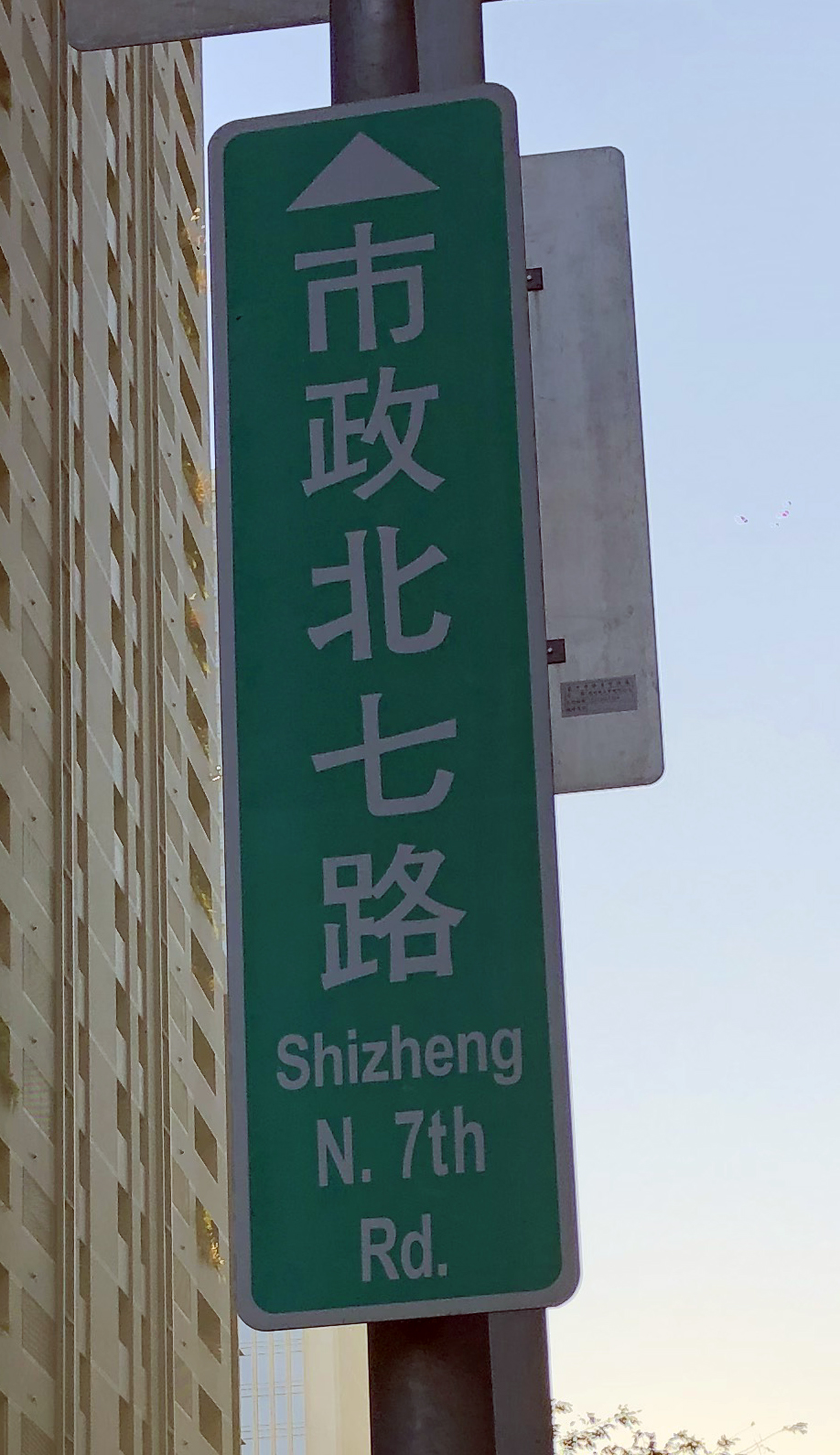
Road sign of Shizheng North 7th Road

Shizheng North 7th Road is named because it is the seventh (七) road running northward (北) from Shizheng Road (市政路), which spans approximately 600 metres. On the other hand, Mandarin pronunciation of the word "北七" (běiqī) shares a homophone to Taiwanese Hokkien profanity of "白痴" (pe̍h-tshi, "idiot").

Due to its homophonic pun, Shizheng North 7th Road often recognised as one of the most unusual place name in Taiwan. For example, the road was voted as the winner of "the most special place name" (特別地名大票選) at PTT Bulletin Board System in 2018.

When Taichung City Hall relocated to the roea during the city's administrative merger in 2010, some locals has suggested renaming the road. Taichung City Government, however, refused the proposal, concerned that the renaming would gain unwanted attentions.

Similar roads named "北七路" exist in Qingshui, Taichung and Yuanshan, Yilan as well. The road in Yuanshan was renamed to Jintai Road (金泰路) to avoid unwanted associations.
