= Daxi Old Street =

Street in Daxi, Taoyuan City, Taiwan

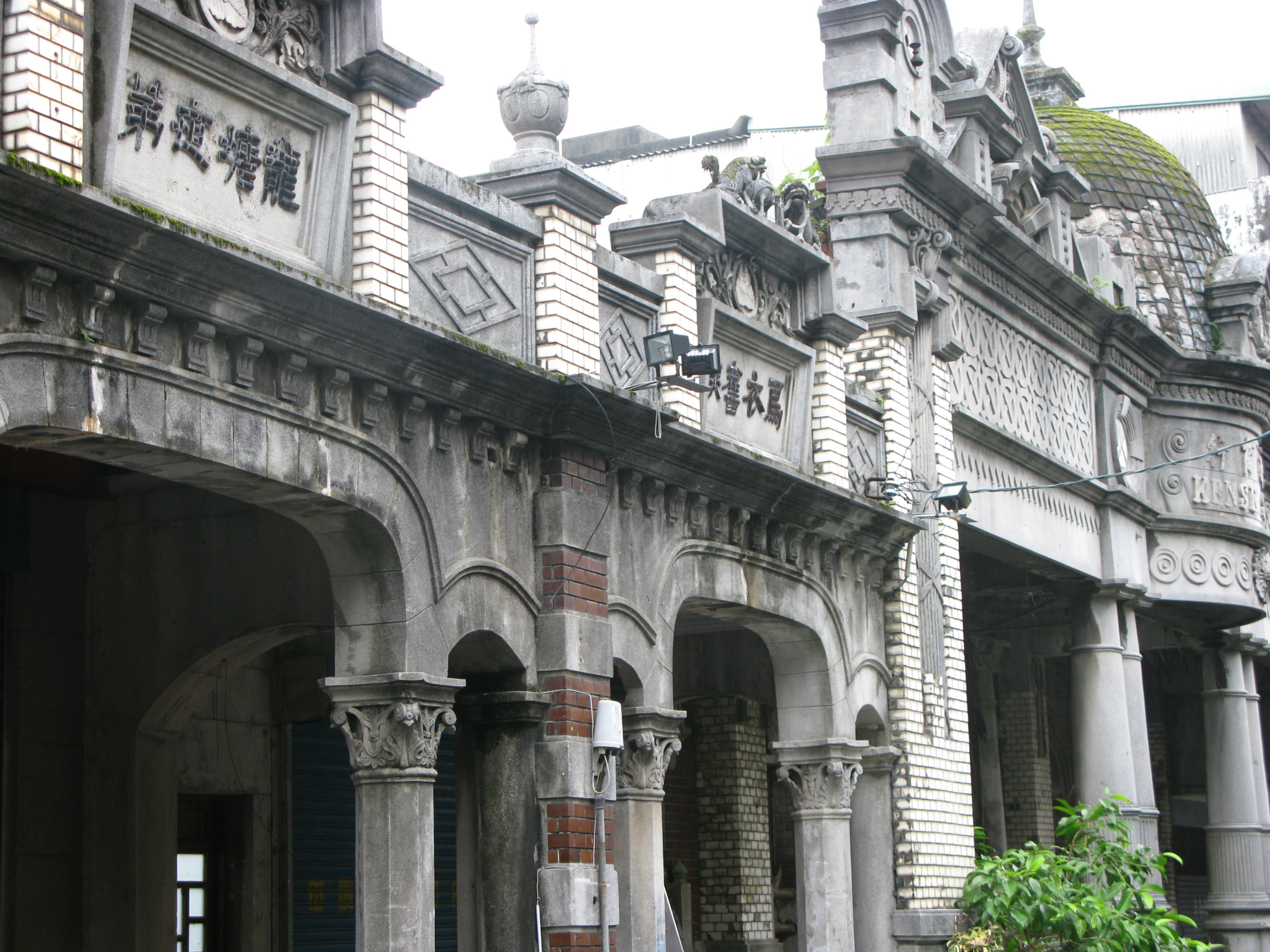

- Location within Taiwan
- Native name: 大溪老街 (Chinese)
- Type: street
- Location: Daxi, Taoyuan City, Taiwan
- Coordinates: 24°53′06.5″N 121°17′15.9″E

The Daxi Old Street (Chinese: 大溪老街; pinyin: Dàxī Lǎojiē) is a street in Daxi District, Taoyuan City, Taiwan.

== History ==
The street used to be the bustling hub for camphor and tea trades which was built during the Japanese rule of Taiwan. When Daxi town had a boom in trades of those two products, the passage through the street was built as a shortcut for workers to pass through so that they could transport goods without taking a long route to walk.

== Architecture ==
The street consists of old stores along Heping Road, Zhongshan Road and Zhongyang Road and is mainly centered on Heping Old Street which was developed relatively late so the residential buildings around the area are still in very good condition. The street is filled with diverse stores with the facade designed in Baroque style that is a perfect blend of East and West. It features the Furen Temple.

== Features ==
There are many specialty stores, snack bars and stores dealing in wooden products along the road.

== See also ==
- List of roads in Taiwan
- List of tourist attractions in Taiwan
