= Xinwu Tianhou Temple =

Coordinates: 24.975648°N 121.026444°E

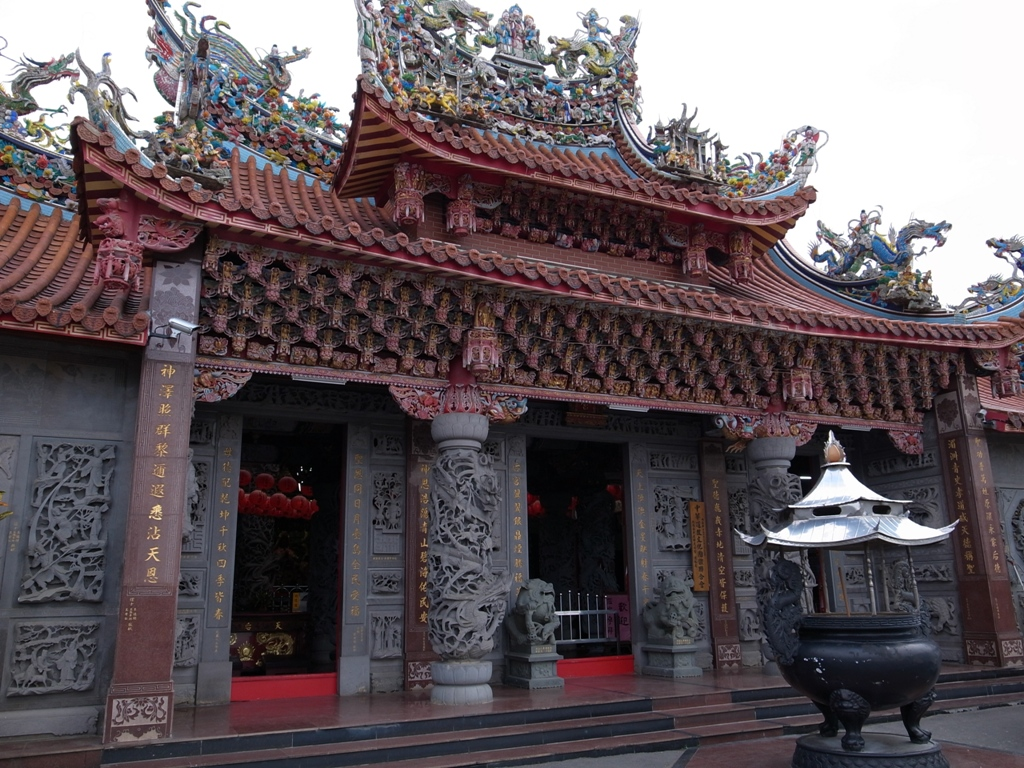
- Entrance
- Traditional Chinese: 天后宮
- Simplified Chinese: 天后宫
- Literal meaning: Heavenly Empress Palace
Transcriptions
Standard Mandarin
- Hanyu Pinyin: Tiānhòu Gōng
- Wade–Giles: Tʻien-hou Kung

The statute of Mazu

The Tianhou or Mazu Temple is a temple to the Goddess Mazu, the Chinese Goddess of Sea and Patron Deity of fishermen, sailors and any occupations related to sea/ocean. It is located in Xinwu District, Taoyuan City, Taiwan.

== History ==
The area of Xinwu was settled by Mazu-worshipping Fujianese immigrants during the mid-18th century, the Qianlong Era of the Qing dynasty. The Tianhou Temple was established in 1826 (the sixth year of Qing's Daoguang Era), with its location supposedly pointed out by the goddess. Its idol came from the Chaotian Temple in Beigang. The original small mud structure has since been rebuilt or renovated in 1878, 1905, 1957, 1984, and 2002.

The bronze statue of Mazu was erected in 2002. It is 32.7 meters (107 ft) high and 72 tons in weight. It is protected by smaller statues of Mazu's door gods and guardians Qianliyan and Shunfeng'er. It is the 2nd-tallest statue of Mazu on Taiwan and the 3rd-tallest in the world.

== See also ==
- Qianliyan & Shunfeng'er
- List of Mazu temples around the world
- List of temples in Taiwan
- List of tallest statues
