= Yanshuei District =

Coordinates: 23.305159°N 120.243143°E

Yanshuei 鹽水區 Ensui, Yanshui, Yenshui
- District
- Yanshuei District
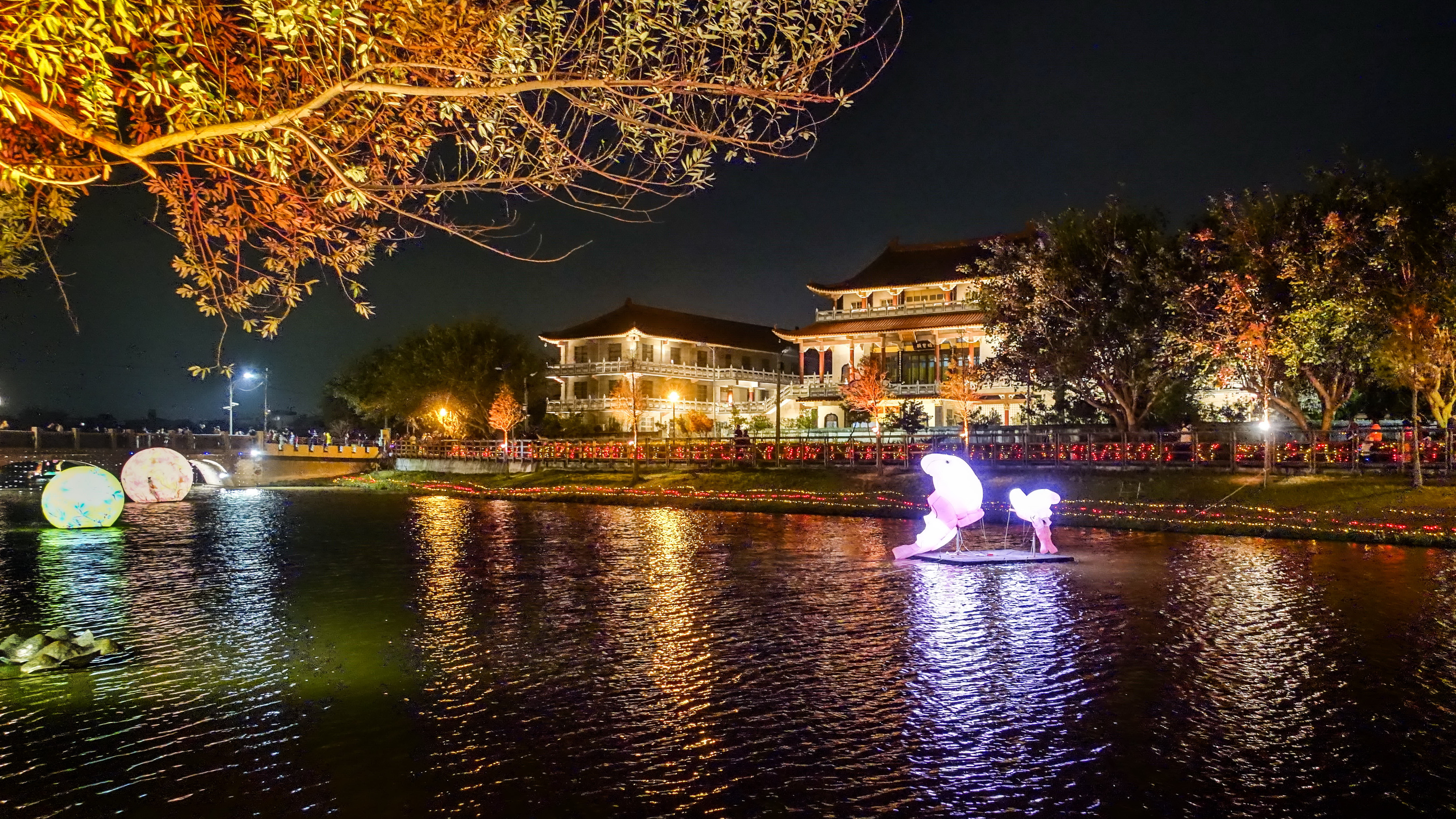
- Yuejin Lantern Festival at the riverfront in Yanshuei

- 臺南市鹽水區公所; Tainan City Yanshuei District Office

- Yanshuei District in Tainan City
- Country: Taiwan
- Special municipality: Tainan

Area
  - Total: 52.25 km^{2} (20.17 sq mi)

Population (January 2023)
  - Total: 24,447
- Website: web.tainan.gov.tw/ysdo_en/

Yanshuei District (Chinese: 鹽水區; Hanyu Pinyin: Yánshuǐ Qū; Tongyong Pinyin: Yánshuěi Cyu; Pe̍h-ōe-jī: Kiâm-chúi-khu; lit. 'salt-water town'), alternatively spelled Yanshui, is a district in Tainan, Taiwan, which is famous for its notoriously dangerous fireworks festival called Yanshui Beehive Fireworks Festival. The annual event commemorates a cholera epidemic more than a century ago, the fireworks symbolizing the exorcism of demons associated with the plague. The festival, known as Fengpao (Chinese: 蜂炮), is celebrated on the 15th day after the beginning of the Lunar New Year, also called Shang Yuan Festival.

== History ==
Formerly known as Goat-tin-kang (Chinese: 月津港; Pe̍h-ōe-jī: Goa̍t-tin-káng). In 1901 during Japanese rule, Ensuikō Chō (鹽水港廳) was one of twenty local administrative offices established. In 1909, this unit was divided among Kagi Chō (嘉義廳) and Tainan Chō (臺南廳). In 1920, after reorganization, Ensui Town (鹽水街) was placed under Shin'ei District (新營郡) of Tainan Prefecture.

Yanshuei used to be one of the five most important maritime towns in Taiwan, but it has declined since the harbor was closed in 1900. These days it is best known for the fireworks festival held 15 days after Lunar New Year.

=== Republic of China ===
After the handover of Taiwan from Japan to the Republic of China in 1945, Yanshuei was organized as an urban township of Tainan County. On 25 December 2010, Tainan County was merged with Tainan City and Yanshuei was upgraded to a district of the city.

Presently, there are no rail links to Yanshuei. In the past, however, the Taiwan Sugar Corporation operated passenger services to Yanshuei station, which has been preserved.

== Geography ==
- Area: 52.25 km^{2}
- Population: 24,447 people (January 2023)

== Administrative divisions ==
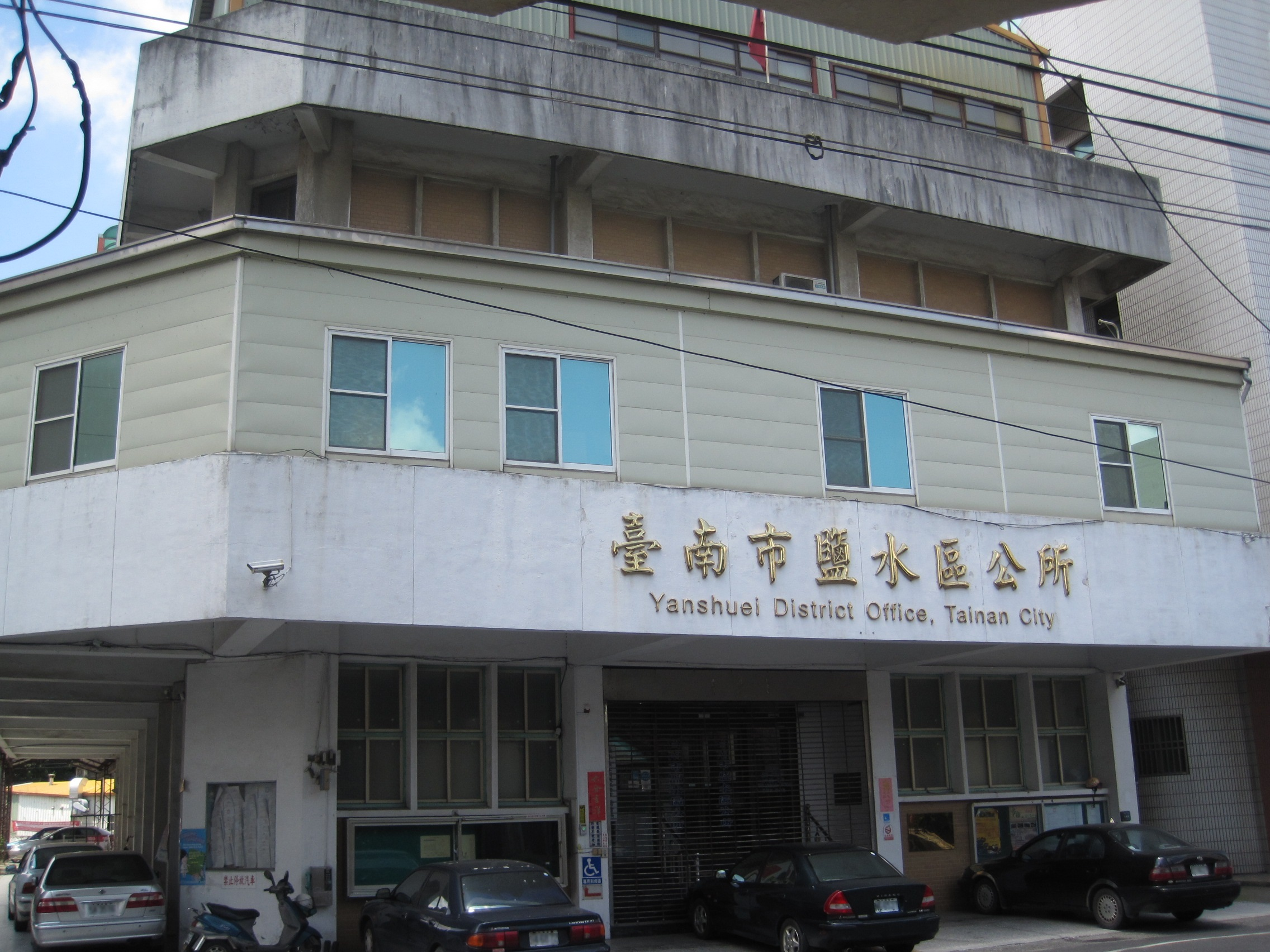
Yanshuei District office

Shuixiu, Fude, Sansheng, Wumiao, Zhongjing, Shuixian, Shuizheng, Qiaonan, Jiuying, Jingshui, Annei, Yichou, Xiazhong, Huanya, Dazhuang, Tongliao, Houzhai, Xuncuo, Zhupu, Xialin, Tianliao, Dafeng, Fandian, Henan and Nangang Village.

== Transportation ==
Yanshuei is easy to reach by National Highway No.1, which passes through this town and Sinying. And, Yanshuei which is by Provincial Highway No.9.

== Tourist attractions ==
- Ciaonan Street

== Festival ==
It is said that the Fireworks Festival originated from a cholera epidemic which broke out in the late Qing rule (around 1875) and lasted for more than twenty years.

In order to drive out the evil spirits and ward off the disease, the survivors invited the spirit of Guan Yu (Kuan Kung), the Chinese god of war. Kuan Kung is worshipped as the God of War; since he was adept at managing finances, he is also worshipped as the patron saint of businessmen.

The deities of Heaven are able to inspect the land on the day of Lantern Festival by carrying the statue of Kuan Kung in palanquins and paraded around Yanshuei and letting off masses of firecrackers, and the epidemic soon receded.

=== "Beehive" Fireworks ===
The most important of Yanshuei's prominent fireworks are the so-called "bee hives", essentially multiple launchers of bottle rockets. These rocket forts are actually thousands of bottle rockets arranged row atop row in an iron-and-wooden framework. The setup looks like a beehive full of unleashed gunpowder. When the contraption is ignited, rockets shoot out rapidly in all directions. Dazzling explosives whiz and whirl across the sky and often into the crowd itself, both thrilling and intimidating the spectators.

Amongst local adherents being hit by a rocket is an indication of good luck in the year to come, with the greater the number of hits the greater the luck. Locals will therefore dress in multiple layers on top of which they wear homemade fireproofs (fireproofing the back of a jacket and pair of trousers, and wearing a cape of fire resistant material) and stand with their backs to the launchers. However, unless so prepared spectators are not allowed in the vicinity of the platforms.

Spectators have been wounded by rocketing fireworks while standing too close to the erupting hive. However, the festival is still held, despite moves to ban it.

To protect against injury, heavy clothing, a helmet with a full visor, and protective gloves are recommended for all spectators. Local residents modify motorcycle helmets by riveting fire retardant material to create an aventail at the back and a flexible gorget at the front. If this is not done a towel is advised to be worn around the neck because many can temporarily lose their hearing if a stray rocket goes inside their helmet.

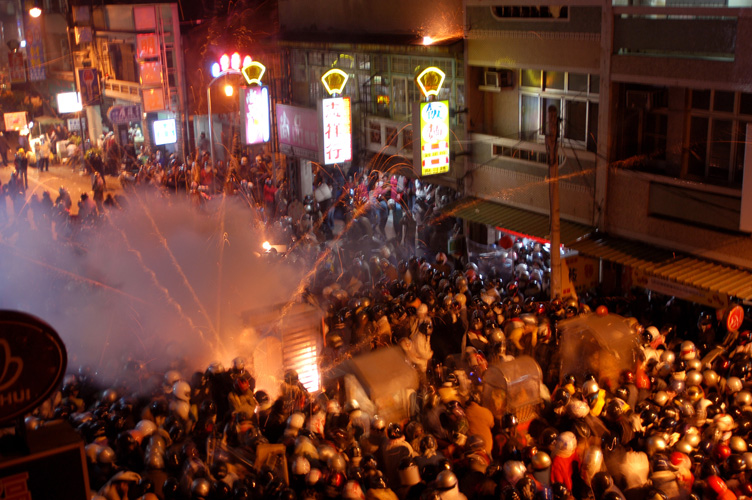

== Notable natives ==
- Ang It-hong, former singer
- Chao Chien-ming, surgeon

== See also ==
- Hwacha
